= Zagarise =

- Comune
- Comune di Zagarise
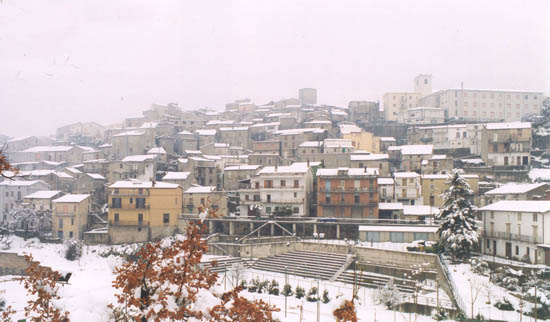

- Location within Italy Location within Calabria
- Coordinates: 39°0′0″N 16°39′45″E
- Country: Italy
- Region: Calabria
- Province: Catanzaro (CZ)

Government
  - Mayor: Domenico Gallelli

Area
  - Total: 49.33 km^{2} (19.05 sq mi)
- Elevation: 581 m (1,906 ft)

Population (30 November 2018)
  - Total: 1,581
  - Density: 32.05/km^{2} (83.01/sq mi)
- Demonym: Zagaritani
- Time zone: UTC+1 (CET)
  - Summer (DST): UTC+2 (CEST)
- Postal code: 88050
- Dialing code: 0961
- Patron saint: San Pancrazio
- Saint day: 9 July
- Website: Official website

Zagarise (Albanian: Zagari) is an Arbëreshë village and comune in the province of Catanzaro in the Calabria region of southern Italy.

== History ==
The name of the settlement first appears in official documents in the 16th century, when the Arbereshe migrated to Italy. Zagarise became an independent village during the early 19th century, when feudalism was abolished in the Kingdom of Naples.

== Geography ==
Zagarise can be found 28 km north of Catanzaro in the Simeri river valley. The town is bordered by Albi, Magisano, Mesoraca, Petronà, Sellia, Sellia Marina, Sersale, Soveria Simeri and Taverna.

== Notable Buildings ==
A Parish Church known as Santa Maria Assunta can be found here with a Portal built in 1521, while the rest of the church was rebuilt in 1783. There is also a Norman Tower that was built by the Falluca family when they owned the fief of Zagarise.

== Gallery ==
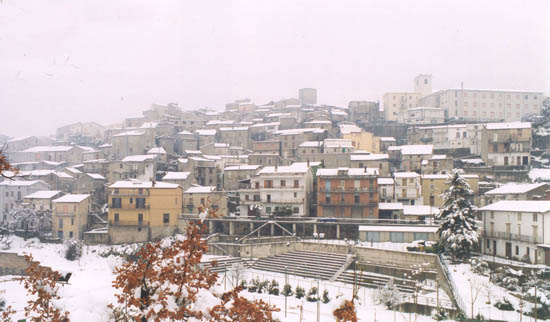
Panorama of Zagarise

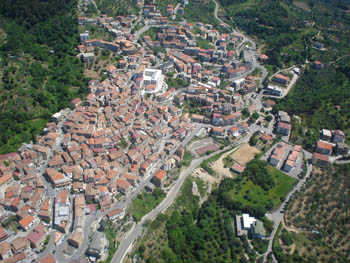
Aerial view of Zagarise

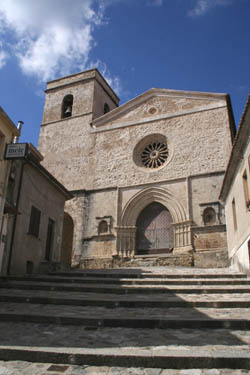
The Parish Church
