= Vallefiorita =

Catanzaro
- Comune
- Comune di Catanzaro
- Location within Italy Location within Calabria
- Coordinates: 38°46′30″N 16°27′40″E
- Country: Italy
- Region: Calabria
- Province: Catanzaro (CZ)

Area
  - Total: 13.83 km^{2} (5.34 sq mi)
- Elevation: 329 m (1,079 ft)

Population (31 December 2013)
  - Total: 1,805
  - Density: 130.5/km^{2} (338.0/sq mi)
- Demonym: Vallefioritesi
- Time zone: UTC+1 (CET)
  - Summer (DST): UTC+2 (CEST)
- Postal code: 88050
- Dialing code: 0961
- Patron saint: Roch (San Rocco)
- Saint day: 16 August
- Website: Official website

Vallefiorita is a town and comune in the province of Catanzaro in the Calabria region of Italy.

== Geography ==
The town is bordered by Amaroni, Cenadi, Centrache, Cortale, Girifalco, Olivadi, Palermiti and Squillace.
