= Sorbo San Basile =

- Comune
- Comune di Sorbo San Basile
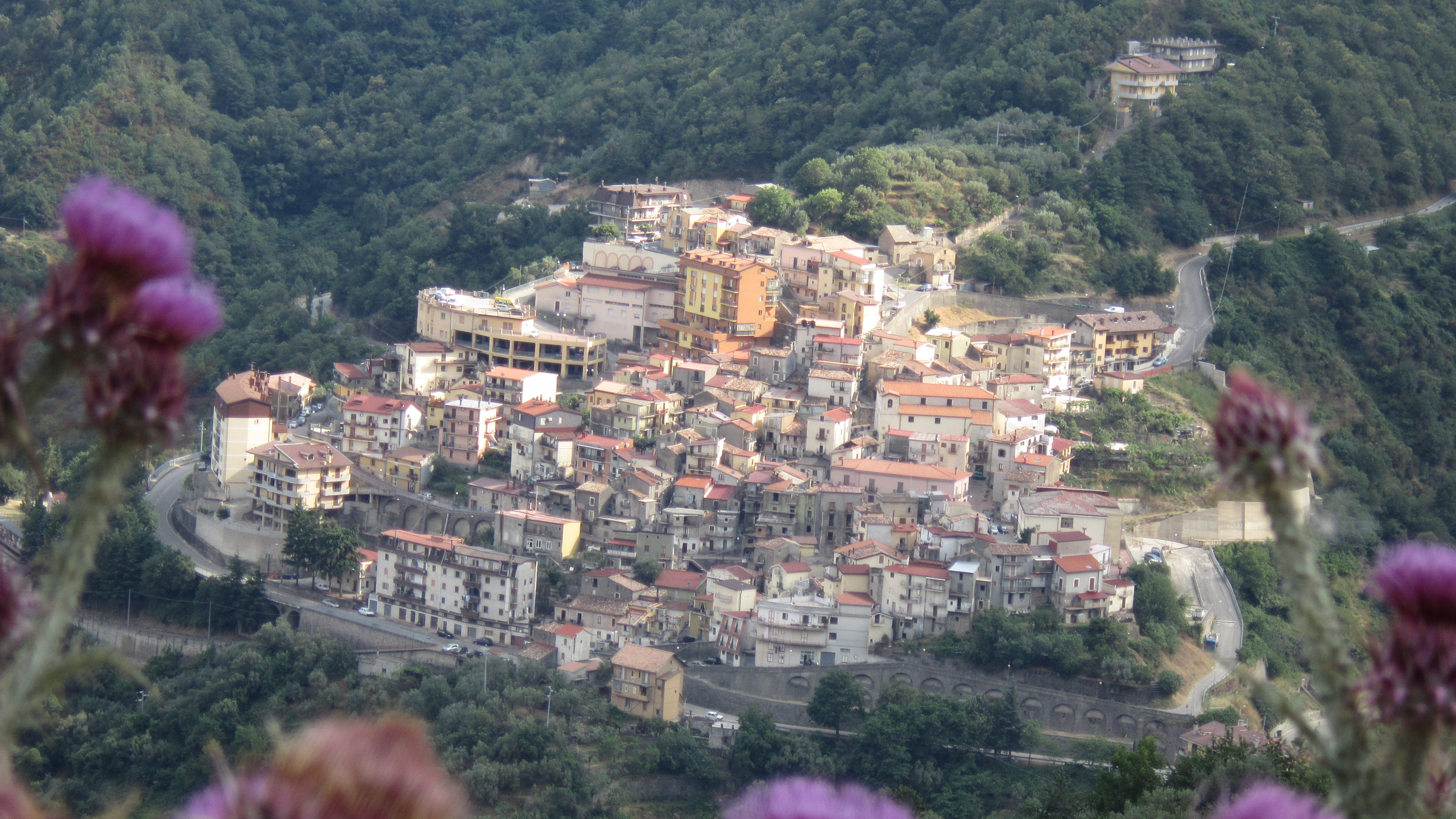
- Aerial view of Sorbo San Basile.

- Location within Italy Location within Calabria
- Coordinates: 39°1′08″N 16°34′10″E
- Country: Italy
- Region: Calabria
- Province: Catanzaro (CZ)
- Frazioni: Melitello, Cutura, villaggio Lagomar

Government
  - Mayor: Vincenzo Nania

Area
  - Total: 58.69 km^{2} (22.66 sq mi)
- Elevation: 605 m (1,985 ft)

Population (31 December 2013)
  - Total: 819
  - Density: 14.0/km^{2} (36.1/sq mi)
- Demonym: Sorbesi
- Time zone: UTC+1 (CET)
  - Summer (DST): UTC+2 (CEST)
- Postal code: 88050
- Dialing code: 0961
- Patron saint: St Francis Xavier
- Saint day: 3 December
- Website: Official website

Sorbo San Basile (Calabrian: U Sòrbu) is a village and comune in the province of Catanzaro in the Calabria region of southern Italy. The word "sorbo" in Italian means "the service tree or the sorb-apple tree" of which there are many orchards in the vicinity. The words "San Basile" refer to the Greek Saint Basil the Great because Basilian monks established a monastery in the area as early as 640.

The town is bordered by Bianchi, Carlopoli, Cicala, Colosimi, Fossato Serralta, Gimigliano, Panettieri, Taverna.
