= San Sostene =

- Comune
- Comune di San Sostene
- Location within Italy Location within Calabria
- Coordinates: 38°38′15″N 16°29′12″E
- Country: Italy
- Region: Calabria
- Province: Catanzaro (CZ)

Government
  - Mayor: Luigi Aloisio

Area
  - Total: 31 km^{2} (12 sq mi)
- Elevation: 470 m (1,540 ft)

Population (31 December 2013)
  - Total: 1,329
  - Density: 43/km^{2} (110/sq mi)
- Demonym: Sansostenesi
- Time zone: UTC+1 (CET)
  - Summer (DST): UTC+2 (CEST)
- Postal code: 88060
- Dialing code: 0967
- Patron saint: St. Sostenes
- Website: Official website

San Sostene (Calabrian: Sanzosti) is a village and comune in the province of Catanzaro in the Calabria region of southern Italy. It is one of the smallest comuni in the province.

The town is bordered by Badolato, Brognaturo, Cardinale, Davoli, Isca sullo Ionio, Sant'Andrea Apostolo dello Ionio and Satriano.

== Economy ==
The main economical activities in the comune include:

- use of wind power
- cultivation of chestnuts
- production of olive oil
- production of wine for themselves
