= Olivadi =

Olivadi Livàdion (Greek)
- Comune
- Comune di Olivadi
- Location within Italy Location within Calabria
- Coordinates: 38°44′N 16°25′E
- Country: Italy
- Region: Calabria
- Province: Catanzaro (CZ)
- Frazioni: Cenadi, Centrache, Petrizzi, San Vito sullo Ionio, Vallefiorita

Area
  - Total: 7 km^{2} (2.7 sq mi)
- Elevation: 485 m (1,591 ft)

Population (31 December 2013)
  - Total: 555
  - Density: 79/km^{2} (210/sq mi)
- Demonym: Olivadesi
- Time zone: UTC+1 (CET)
  - Summer (DST): UTC+2 (CEST)
- Postal code: 88060
- Dialing code: 0967
- ISTAT code: 079088
- Patron saint: Sant'Elia
- Saint day: 20 July
- Website: Official website

Olivadi (Greek: Livadion) is a comune and town in the province of Catanzaro in the Calabria region of Italy.
