= Montauro =

- Comune
- Comune di Montauro
- Coat of arms

- Location within Italy Location within Calabria
- Coordinates: 38°45′N 16°31′E
- Country: Italy
- Region: Calabria
- Province: Catanzaro (CZ)
- Frazioni: Montauro Scalo

Government
  - Mayor: Giancarlo Cerullo (IDEA Montauro)

Area
  - Total: 11.54 km^{2} (4.46 sq mi)
- Elevation: 391 m (1,283 ft)

Population (March 2017)
  - Total: 1,593
  - Density: 138.0/km^{2} (357.5/sq mi)
- Demonym: Montaurese
- Time zone: UTC+1 (CET)
  - Summer (DST): UTC+2 (CEST)
- Postal code: 88060
- Dialing code: 0967
- Patron saint: San Pantaleone
- Saint day: 27 July, 5 February
- Website: Official website

Montauro (Calabrian: Mentràvu) is a comune and town in the province of Catanzaro in the Calabria region of Italy. The municipalities of Gasperina, Montepaone, Palermiti, Squillace, Stalettì are nearby. Agricultural center of the Ionian coast of the greenhouses, in foothills sloping towards the Gulf of Squillace, North of the mouth of the river Soverato. Built before the year 1000, the village had name from the mountain on which it stands, felt with gold. In 1101 by Count Roger was given in fief to the carthusians of Serra San Bruno. Severely damaged by the earthquake of 1783, in 1846 he suffered other damage due to an exceptional flood. The parish church incorporates remains of medieval fortifications with its external structures; in the Interior, which currently occurs in the appearance given to him in the 17th century, wooden ceiling and choir ' 600, sumptuous altar in polychrome marble and bronze sculptures (of the Redeemer and the Apostles) and marble (Saints Peter and Paul) of 600-700 's. Near the village there are the ruins of the monastery of San Domenico now call "La Grangia di Sant' Anna", of Norman Foundation and destroyed by an earthquake in 1783. Montauro has amazing Portals from many years of age. A Medieval town that looks over the Ionian Sea. In Montauro there are many different association registered like:

Proloco di Montauro, Fiaccola di Sant Pantaleone, Radice Sociale, Associazione Femminile, Associazione Pisani, MYMontauro Group, Polisportiva Montauro

In the past 3 years since 2018 Montauro has been in a development plan where the citizens are in a full commitment to revive the town with traditions, culture, music and much more.

Montauro in the medieval times

The origins of the Montauro farmhouse, according to some historians, date back to the eighth century. The first group of houses was built in the vicinity of the 'u mucatu district, to the north of the town, a little higher than the dilapidated houses, where today the new road to Gasperina winds its way; others, on the other hand, place the farmhouse further down, halfway up the hill, in a lower position than the current one.

It is probable that after the seventh century, when, following the edicts of 726, prohibiting the cult of images, and in 730, the destruction of images, and the consequent persecution of the Monks of San Basilio by the emperor Leo III Isauric, the Basilians, who took refuge on the Calabrian coasts, built not only monasteries, but also contributed to the formation of civil and religious communities. This hypothesis can be confirmed by the fact that the oldest toponym of Montauro handed down by some sources, is of Greek origin, Mentràbrion, while the Latin one is Mentaurum. In the eleventh century in the diocese of Squillace there were twelve Basilian monasteries, including that of San Gregorio di Stalettì.

The cult of oriental saints venerated in our countries is proof that the Italian districts begin their journey of faith precisely in this historical period, even if the diocese of Squillace already existed for several centuries, whose foundation dates back to the apostolic age. Ages in whose territory there were already some monasteries founded by Cassiodorus, long before the arrival of the monks of San Basilio. In Montauro, Saint Pantaleone, martyr of Nicomedia, today's Izmit is venerated.

Before Bruno di Colonia founded the charterhouse in Calabria in 1091, and even before 1000, the hamlet of Montauro, it can be assumed, had already achieved a certain autonomy. In fact, certain historical documents attest to the presence of the hamlet of Montauro even before the year 1000. Among the first documents is the so-called "Placitum", by Count Roger, who donated "to the hermits of the Certosa di Santa Maria del Bosco" a mill for the sustenance of the workers of the building of the Monastery of Mentabro [6]. Other donations confirmed by the various Popes followed: Urban II, in 1098, Pasquale II, in 1102, Callisto II, in 1120. The first economic, social and religious impulse of the farmhouse was given by the Basilian monks, further developed by the Normans and the Carthusians, to whom ecclesiastical jurisdiction was granted by Giovanni, bishop of Squillace in 1098, and the civil one by Count Roger, a privilege confirmed by Pope Urban II. In this period the population of Montauro was the site of a sudden increase, as a large group of 112 prisoner heads of families were brought into the municipality, with children, brothers, brothers-in-law, and grandchildren, in all 218 people, of whom healthy and wounded were forced to initial imprisonment in 162, the others were saved with the escape, almost all coming from the districts of Squillace and Soverato, which in Capua had betrayed Count Ruggero, for which they had been sentenced to capital punishment, but through the intercession of San Bruno, the Count commuted this penalty to perpetual servitude under the Carthusian fathers.

The community and economy of Montauro developed after the year 1000 by the Normans, who, subtracting the lands of Calabria from the Byzantines, founded a feudal state headed by Roberto il Guiscardo (1015-1085), then in 1061 he left the company to his brother Roger I (1031-Mileto 1101), whose son Roger II (1095-1154) was nominated Duke of Puglia and Calabria in 1127. In this period Montauro was the protagonist of a significant demographic increase (1175 in the 1278 census). In 1098 Count Roger I of Altavilla placed the hamlet of Montauro under the civil jurisdiction of the Certosa, for which the Bishop of Squillace Giovanni ceded the ecclesiastical jurisdiction. The donation would have been confirmed by Pope Calisto II in 1120 with a diploma whose authenticity is controversial.

Emperor Frederick II reconfirmed the donation both in 1212 and in 1224. There would also be news of a series of donations in documents of the Angevin chancellery: in a diploma of Charles I of 1272, in another of Charles II of 1305, in still another by Giovanna I of 1344. The population of Montauro at the census of 1276 numbered 1 176 units. As is known, in 1192, the monastery of Santo Stefano del Bosco, with all its vast patrimony, passed from the Carthusians to the Cistercians and from these, starting from the fifteenth century, to commendatory Abbots, who, aimed at earning a mere income by limiting any expense, they took no care in the administration of the estate.

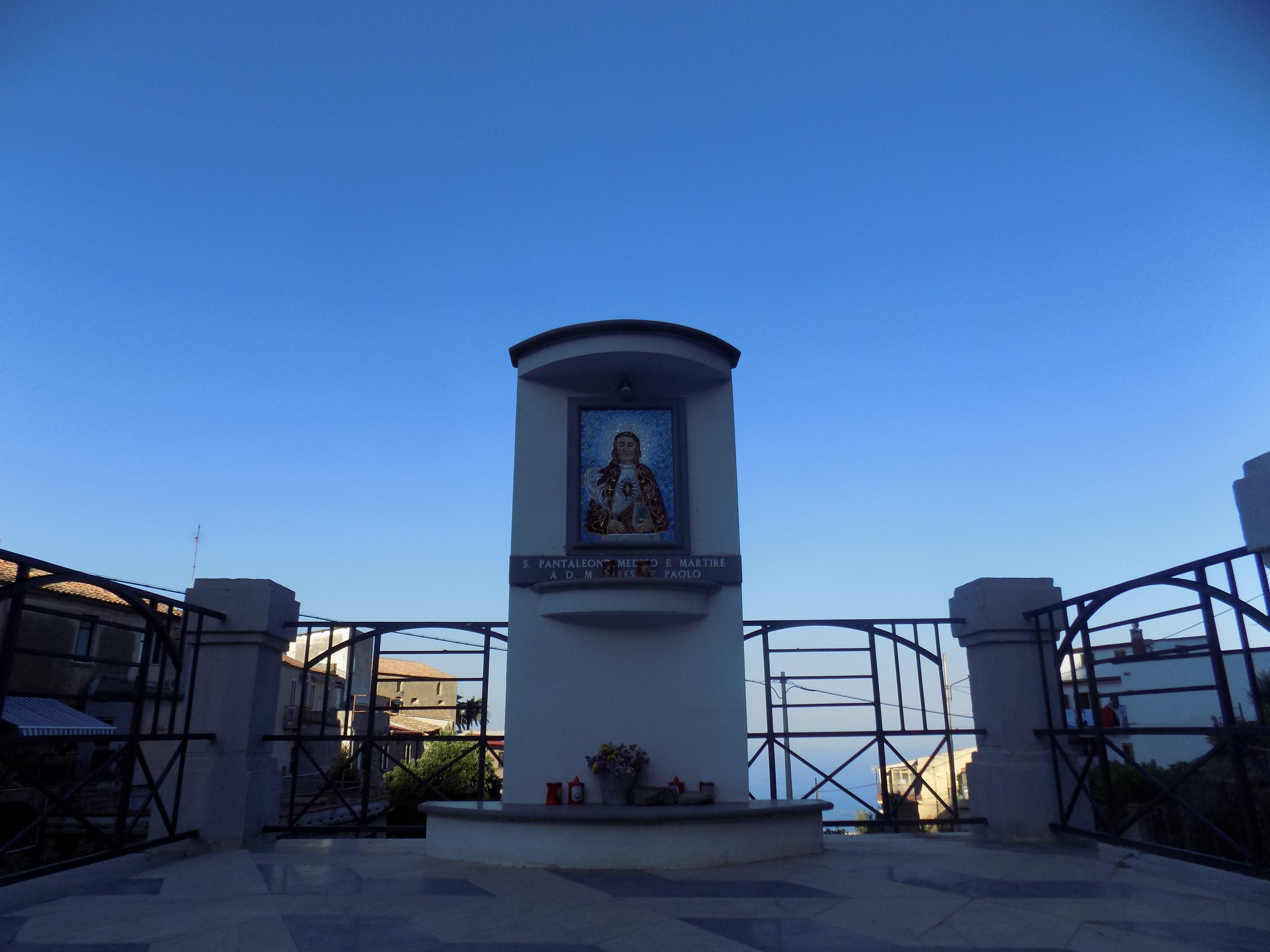
Montauro in Piazza by Luca Mercurio
