= San Floro =

- Comune
- Comune di San Floro
- Location within Italy Location within Calabria
- Coordinates: 38°50′N 16°31′E
- Country: Italy
- Region: Calabria
- Province: Catanzaro (CZ)
- Frazioni: Borgia, Caraffa di Catanzaro, Catanzaro, Cortale, Girifalco, Maida

Area
  - Total: 18 km^{2} (6.9 sq mi)
- Elevation: 260 m (850 ft)

Population (31 December 2013)
  - Total: 726
  - Density: 40/km^{2} (100/sq mi)
- Demonym: Sanfloresi
- Time zone: UTC+1 (CET)
  - Summer (DST): UTC+2 (CEST)
- Postal code: 88021
- Dialing code: 0961
- ISTAT code: 079108
- Patron saint: San Floro
- Saint day: 18 August
- Website: Official website

San Floro is a comune and town in the province of Catanzaro in the Calabria region of Italy.
