= Satriano (Calabria) =

- Comune
- Comune di Satriano
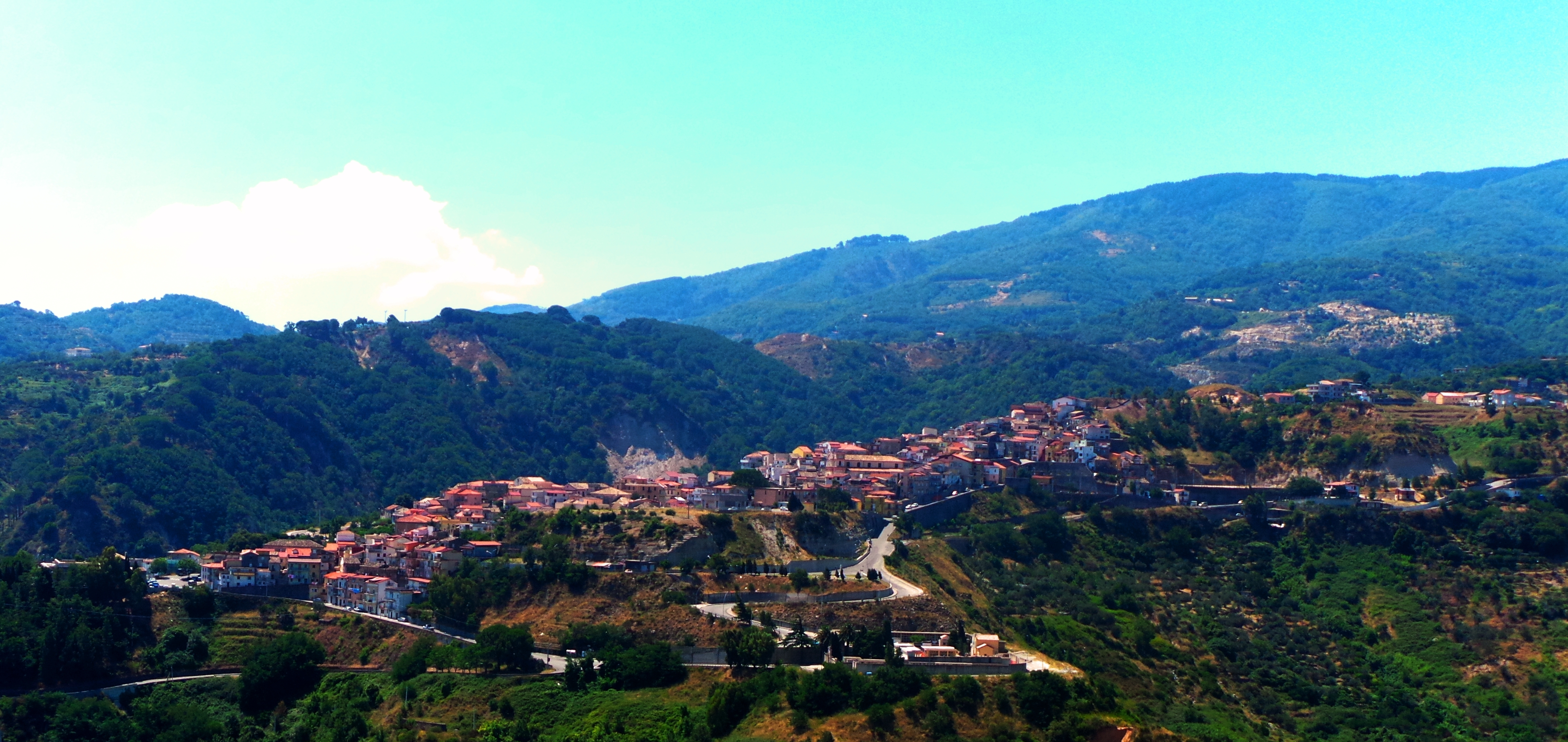
- Satriano

- Location within Italy Location within Calabria
- Coordinates: 38°40′N 16°28′E
- Country: Italy
- Region: Calabria
- Province: Catanzaro (CZ)

Area
  - Total: 22 km^{2} (8.5 sq mi)
- Elevation: 287 m (942 ft)

Population (31 December 2013)
  - Total: 3,441
  - Density: 160/km^{2} (410/sq mi)
- Demonym: Satrianesi
- Time zone: UTC+1 (CET)
  - Summer (DST): UTC+2 (CEST)
- Postal code: 88060
- Dialing code: 0967
- Patron saint: San Teodoro
- Saint day: 9 November

Satriano is a town and comune in the province of Catanzaro in the Calabria region of southern Italy.

== Geography ==
The town is bordered by Cardinale, Davoli, Gagliato, Petrizzi, San Sostene and Soverato.
