= Sellia Marina =

- Comune
- Comune di Sellia Marina
- Location within Italy Location within Calabria
- Coordinates: 38°55′N 16°45′E
- Country: Italy
- Region: Calabria
- Province: Catanzaro (CZ)
- Frazioni: Cropani, Sersale, Simeri Crichi, Soveria Simeri, Zagarise

Area
  - Total: 40.9 km^{2} (15.8 sq mi)
- Elevation: 82 m (269 ft)

Population (2013)
  - Total: 7,361
  - Density: 180/km^{2} (466/sq mi)
- Demonym: Seliesi
- Time zone: UTC+1 (CET)
  - Summer (DST): UTC+2 (CEST)
- Postal code: 88050
- Dialing code: 0961
- ISTAT code: 079127
- Patron saint: San Nicola di Bari
- Saint day: 25 May
- Website: Official website

Sellia Marina is a town and comune in the province of Catanzaro, in the Calabria region of southern Italy.

== Geography ==
Sellia Marina houses the master station of the LORAN-C transmitters in the Mediterranean, for low frequency radio navigation.
