= Sellia =

Sellia may refer to:

- Sellia, Chania, a village in the municipality of Vamos, Chania, Greece
- Sellia, Rethymno, a village in the municipality of Foinikas, Rethymno, Greece
- Sellia, Calabria, a comune in the Province of Catanzaro, Italy
- Sellia (gastropod), a genus in family Hydrobiidae

== See also ==
- Sellia Marina, a comune in the Province of Catanzaro, Calabria, Italy
