= Cenadi =

Cenadi Greek: Genádioi
- Comune
- Comune di Cenadi
- Location within Italy Location within Calabria
- Coordinates: 38°43′N 16°25′E
- Country: Italy
- Region: Calabria
- Province: Catanzaro (CZ)
- Frazioni: Cortale, Olivadi, Polia (VV), San Vito sullo Ionio, Vallefiorita

Area
  - Total: 11 km^{2} (4.2 sq mi)
- Elevation: 539 m (1,768 ft)

Population (31 December 2013)
  - Total: 573
  - Density: 52/km^{2} (130/sq mi)
- Demonym: Cenadesi
- Time zone: UTC+1 (CET)
  - Summer (DST): UTC+2 (CEST)
- Postal code: 88067
- Dialing code: 0967
- ISTAT code: 079024
- Patron saint: San Giovanni Battista
- Saint day: 24 June
- Website: Official website

Cenadi (Greek: Genadioi) is a comune and town in the province of Catanzaro in the Calabria region of Italy.

== Etymology ==
The town's name is derived from cena, the Italian word for "dinner". A legend claims that St. John the Evangelist was passing through the town on his way to Rome, and stopped for dinner.
