= Sellia, Calabria =

Sellia
- Comune
- Comune di Sellia
- Location within Italy Location within Calabria
- Coordinates: 38°59′N 16°38′E
- Country: Italy
- Region: Calabria
- Province: Catanzaro (CZ)

Area
  - Total: 12 km^{2} (4.6 sq mi)
- Elevation: 560 m (1,840 ft)

Population (31 December 2013)
  - Total: 526
  - Density: 44/km^{2} (110/sq mi)
- Time zone: UTC+1 (CET)
  - Summer (DST): UTC+2 (CEST)
- Postal code: 88050
- Dialing code: 0961
- Website: Official website

Sellia (Greek: Sèllia) is a village and comune in the province of Catanzaro, in the Calabria region of southern Italy.

There were 1,300 residents in the town in 1960. In 2015 the town had 537 residents; about 60% of the residents are over 65 years of age. That year Davide Zicchinella, the mayor, signed a decree stating that "it is forbidden to get sick in the town."

== Geography ==
The village is bordered by Albi, Catanzaro, Magisano, Pentone, Simeri Crichi, Soveria Simeri and Zagarise.
