= Simeri Crichi =

- Comune
- Comune di Simeri Crichi
- Location within Italy Location within Calabria
- Coordinates: 38°57′15″N 16°38′20″E
- Country: Italy
- Region: Calabria
- Province: Catanzaro (CZ)
- Frazioni: Porto d'Orra, Marincoli, Homomorto

Area
  - Total: 46.7 km^{2} (18.0 sq mi)

Population (31 December 2013)
  - Total: 4,699
  - Density: 101/km^{2} (261/sq mi)
- Demonym: Cricari
- Time zone: UTC+1 (CET)
  - Summer (DST): UTC+2 (CEST)
- Postal code: 88050
- Dialing code: 0961
- Website: Official website

Simeri Crichi (Greek: Mesimerion-Krikos) is a town and comune in the province of Catanzaro in the Calabria region of southern Italy.

== Geography ==
The town is bordered by Catanzaro, Sellia, Sellia Marina and Soveria Simeri.

A thermoelectric plant powered by natural gas has been there since 2004.
