= San Pietro a Maida =

- Comune
- Comune di San Pietro a Maida
- Location within Italy Location within Calabria
- Coordinates: 38°50′50″N 16°20′30″E
- Country: Italy
- Region: Calabria
- Province: Catanzaro (CZ)
- Frazioni: San Pietro a Maida Scalo

Area
  - Total: 16.3 km^{2} (6.3 sq mi)
- Elevation: 365 m (1,198 ft)

Population (31 December 2013)
  - Total: 4,301
  - Density: 264/km^{2} (683/sq mi)
- Time zone: UTC+1 (CET)
  - Summer (DST): UTC+2 (CEST)
- Postal code: 88025
- Dialing code: 0968
- Patron saint: San Nicola di Bari
- Website: Official website

San Pietro a Maida (Calabrian: San Pìetru a Majida) is a town and comune in the province of Catanzaro in the Calabria region of southern Italy.

== Geography ==
The town is bordered by Curinga, Jacurso, Lamezia Terme and Maida and sits on a plateau 355 meters above sea level and has a land area equal to 16.35 km². The soil in the area is conducive to agriculture and especially olive cultivation.

Due to its proximity to the Tyrrhenian Sea, San Pietro a Maida enjoys a mild climate.

== History ==
The area had been settled since ancient times and many different stories concerning its origin have been told. According to various accounts, the town emerged from a reclaimed village called "Petrum" that existed some time in the 15th century. Reliable sources have pointed to older origins and have speculated that the town was established around the same time as nearby Curinga in the 9th-10th centuries.

Archaeological evidence suggests that the lowermost part of the territory was for a very long time an important settlement during the early Lower Paleolithic (700,000-500,000 years ago). Since 1973, the discovery of many stone artifacts confirmed the existence of paleotithic settlements dating back to the Pleistocene and Quaternary periods.

== Monuments and Places of Interest ==
The churches of San Nicola di Bari, Santa Maria and San Giovanni are the three major churches in the town. Established in the 16th century, the church of San Nicola di Bari is the largest and is named after the patron saint, Saint Nicholas.

Terracotta bas-reliefs by sculptors Francesco and Fortunato Violi recount the history and origins of San Pietro a Maida and decorate the streets.

== Culture ==
The town is known to host special "Ulivo" events that are held once every two years since 1985. Other festivals occur throughout the year celebrating the town's history.

== Economy ==
San Pietro a Maida's economy is derived from agriculture. While olive oil is the main export in the area, the town also produces large quantities of wheat, fruits and vegetables. The town has also developed thanks to a strong emigration to countries such as Switzerland and Germany. Immigration to countries such as Australia, Argentina and the United States also greatly benefited the town.
