= Montepaone =

- Comune
- Comune di Montepaone
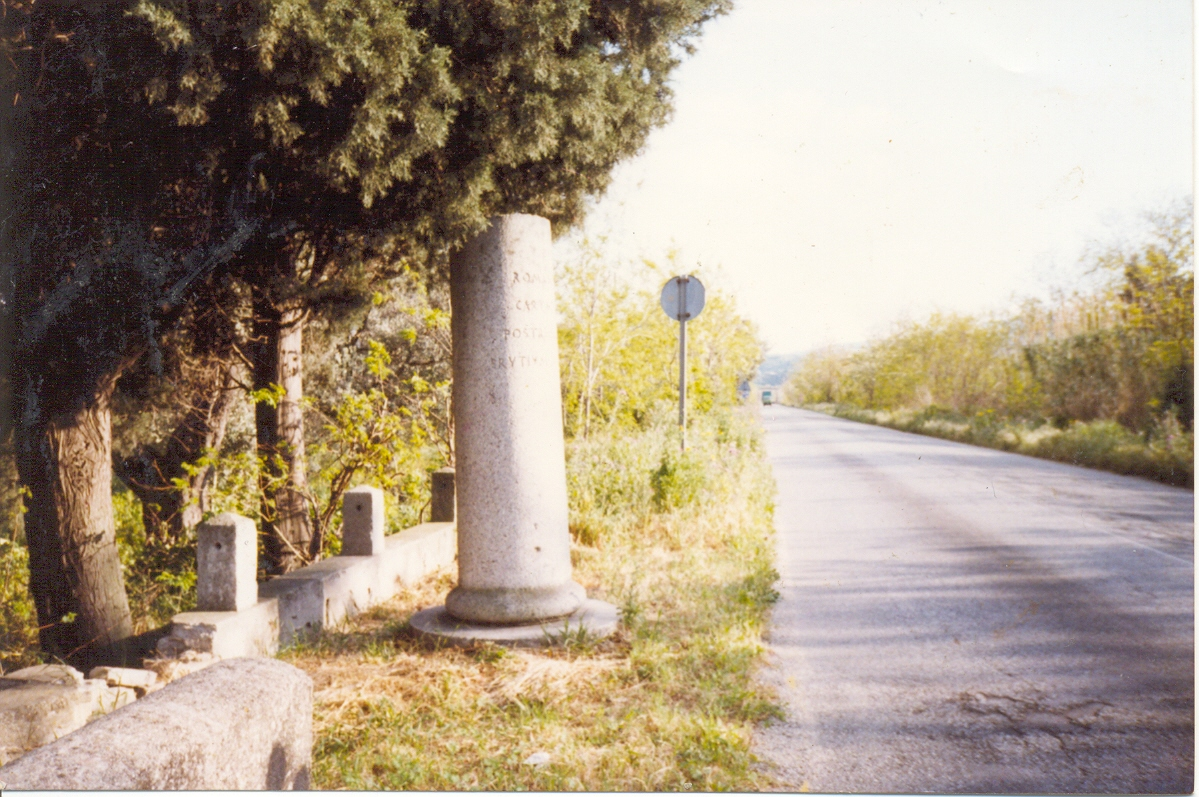
- The so-called "Column of Hannibal".

- Coat of arms

- Location within Italy Location within Calabria
- Coordinates: 38°43′25″N 16°29′45″E
- Country: Italy
- Region: Calabria
- Province: Catanzaro (CZ)
- Frazioni: Frabotto Mannesì, Montepaone Lido, Paparo, Sant'Angelo, Timponello

Government
  - Mayor: Mario Migliarese

Area
  - Total: 16.9 km^{2} (6.5 sq mi)
- Elevation: 361 m (1,184 ft)

Population (31 December 2013)
  - Total: 5,142
  - Density: 304/km^{2} (788/sq mi)
- Demonym: Montepaonesi
- Time zone: UTC+1 (CET)
  - Summer (DST): UTC+2 (CEST)
- Postal code: 88060
- Dialing code: 0967
- Patron saint: S. Felix Martyr (Montepaone centro), S. John the Baptist (Montepaone Lido)
- Website: Official website

Montepaone (Calabrian: Muntipaùna) is a town and comune of the province of Catanzaro in the Calabria region of southern Italy.

== Geography ==
Montepaone sits on the Italian Ionian sea in the Gulf of Squillace. Soverato, Gasperina, Montauro and Caminia (Staletti) are nearby towns.

== Economy ==
Montepaone is highly reliant on seasonal tourism both from Italian-Americans visiting family in the region and from Northern Italians. The work force in the town is around 19% of the total population.

Montepaone Centro
