= Lake Passante =

Artificial lake in Calabria, Italy

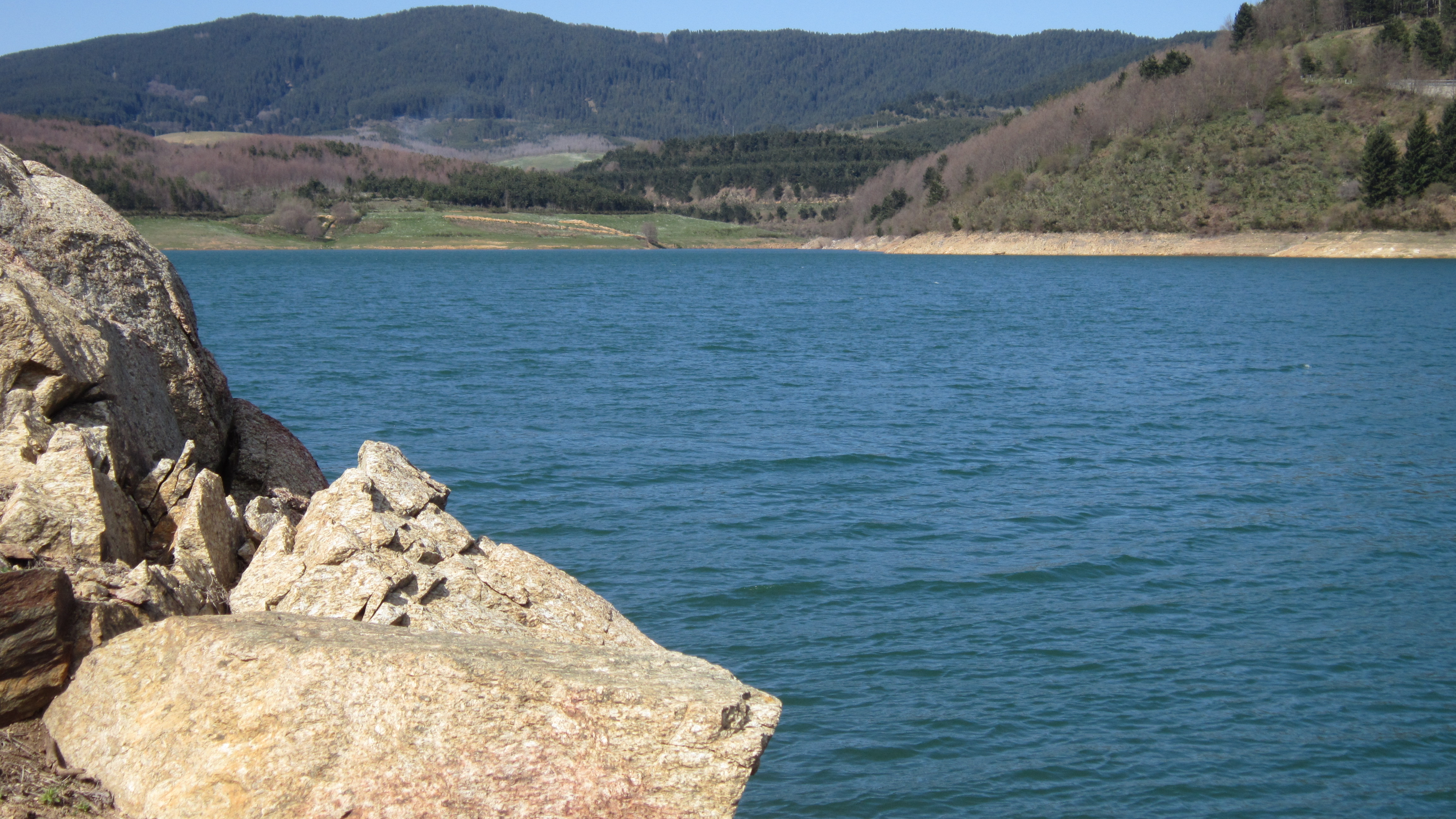
- View of the lake

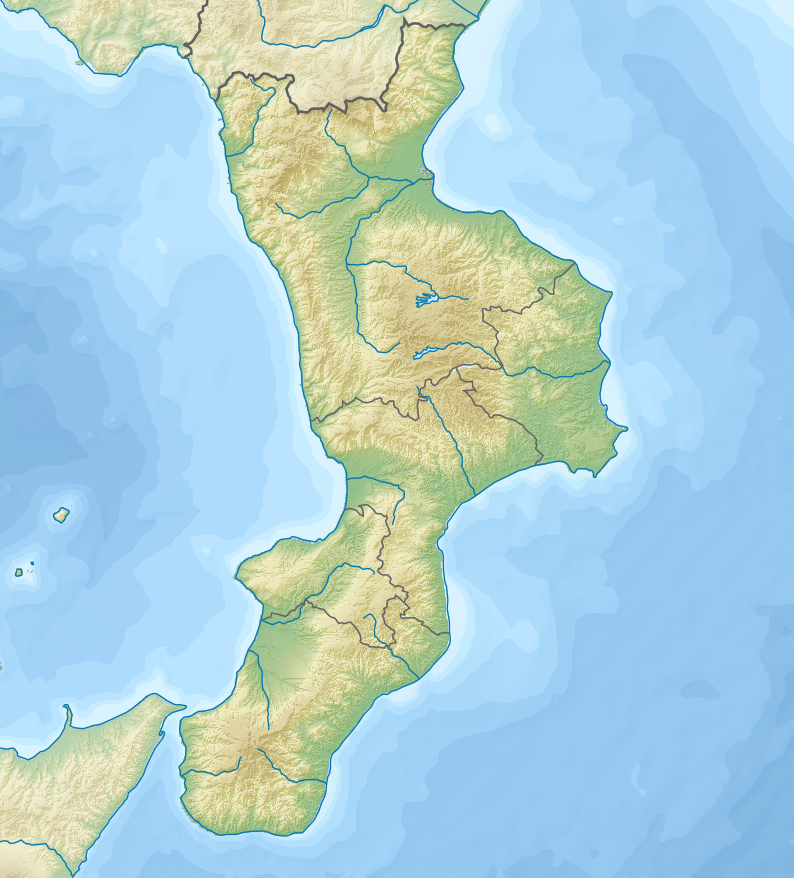
- Location of Lake Passante Lake Passante (Italy)
- Location: Taverna, Sorbo San Basile (Province of Catanzaro), Colosimi (Province of Cosenza), Calabria, Italy
- Coordinates: 39°05′56″N 16°31′01″E
- Type: Artificial
- Basin countries: Italy
- Surface area: 1.9 km^{2} (0.73 sq mi)
- Water volume: 0.038 km^{3} (0.0091 cu mi)

The Lake Passante is a Calabrian lake located in the Sila Piccola, spanning the municipalities of Taverna (CZ), Sorbo San Basile (CZ), and Colosimi (CS).

== Origin ==
The lake is an artificial basin, formed through damming with a reinforced concrete dam. Construction began in 1971 and was completed in 1976.

== Characteristics ==
The lake, situated within the territory of the Sila National Park, is located near Villaggio Mancuso, a tourist village in the Sila. It is easily accessible by traveling along the SS 179, a state road that leads from Catanzaro to the Calabrian plateau up to Lake Ampollino.

== Flora and fauna ==
The fish species present include: trout, carp, perch, chub, bleak, nase, goldfish, rudd, eel.

On 22 November 2011, the lake was drained for dam maintenance work, resulting in the death of thousands of fish and effectively eliminating all fish species.

== Hydroelectric plants ==
The 65-meter-high and 450-meter-long dam feeds two consecutive power plants that generate respective capacities of 36 MW and 39 MW.

== Gallery ==
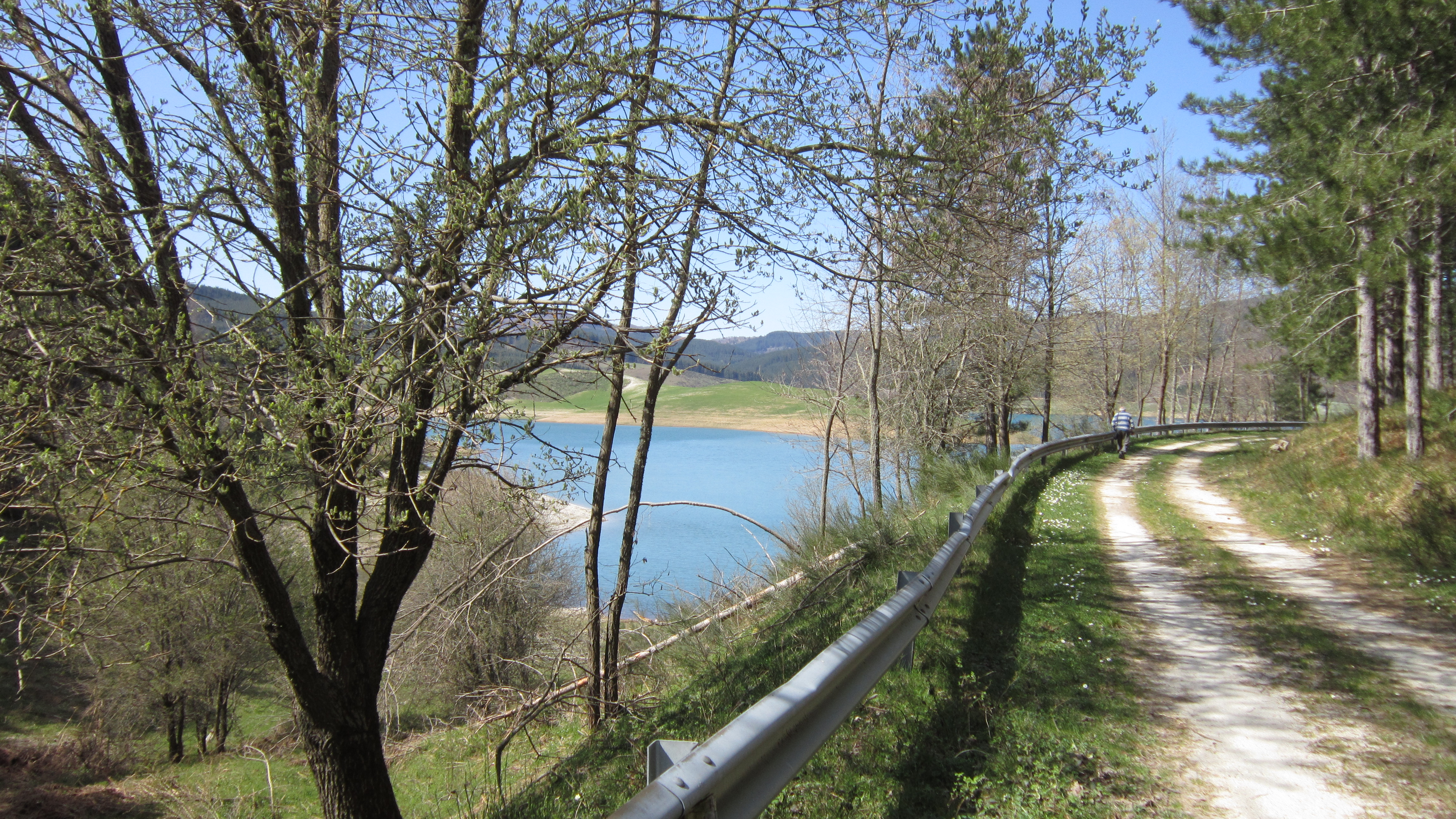
Lakeshore

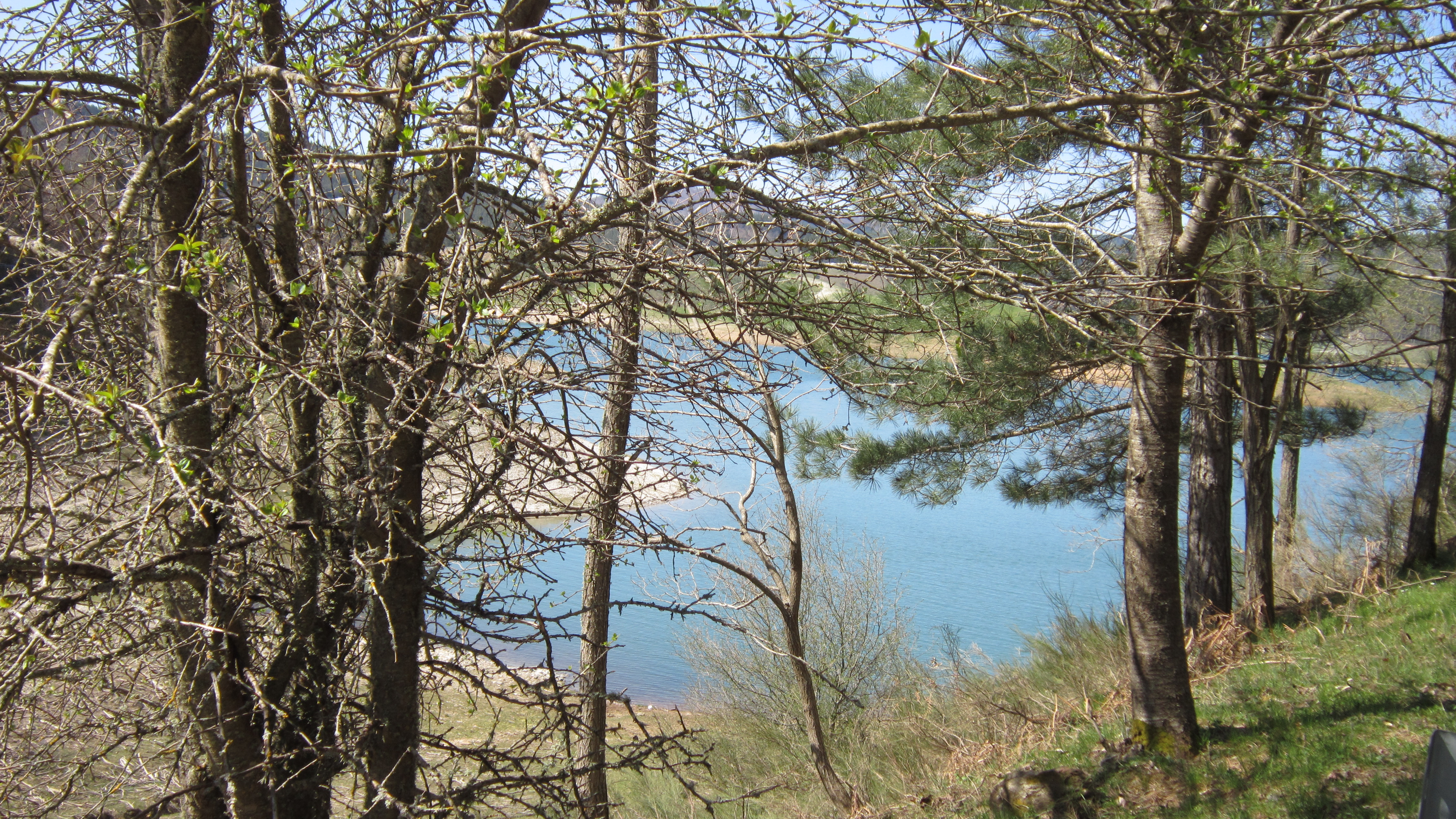
Lake Passante
