= Province of Catanzaro =

Province of Italy

Coordinates: 38°54′36″N 16°35′15″E

Province of Catanzaro Provincia di Catanzaro (Italian) Pruvincia e Catanzaru (Neapolitan) Κατανρζάριον / Katanrzarion (Ancient Greek)
- Province
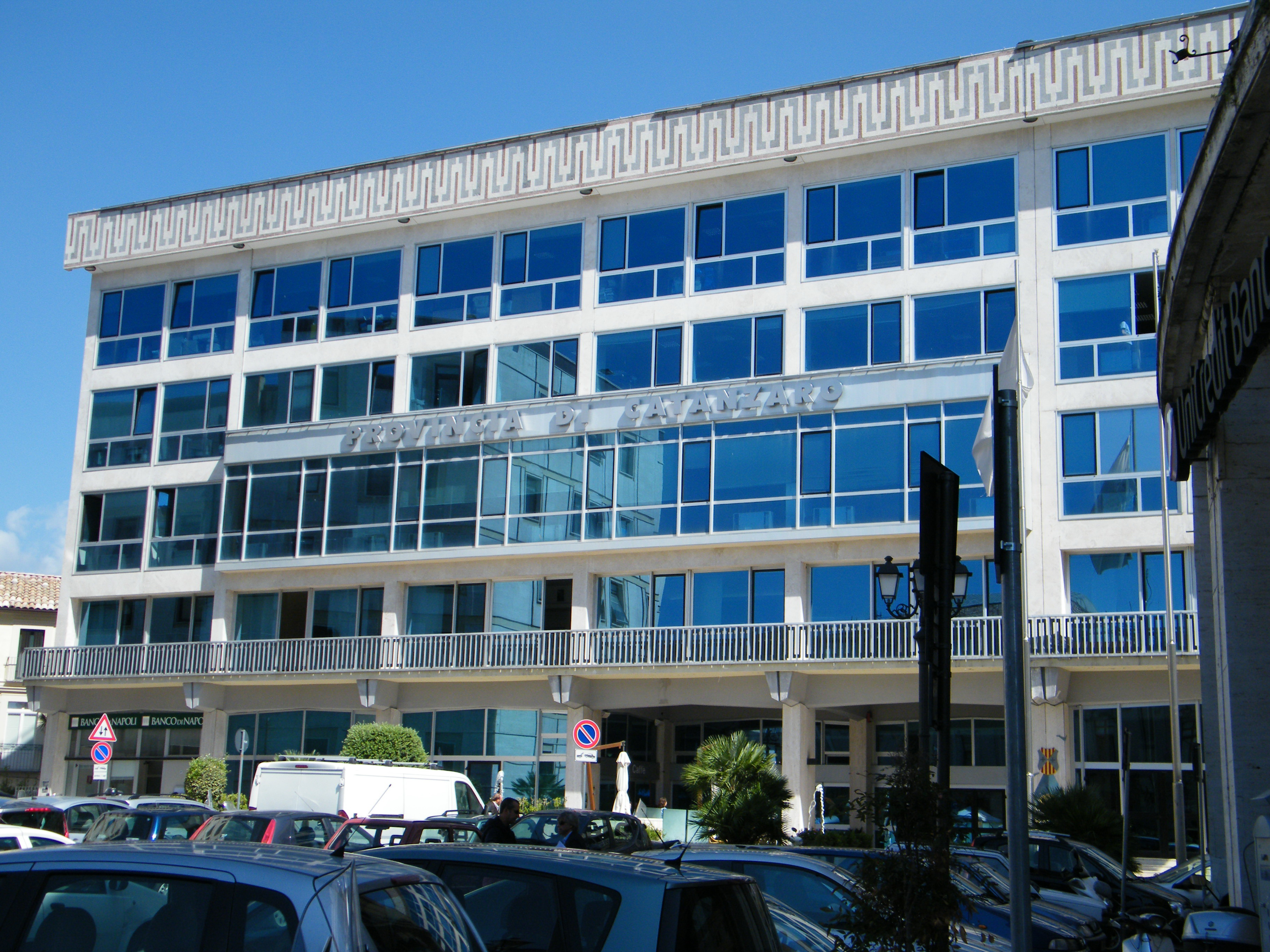
- Palazzo di Vetro at Catanzaro, the provincial seat

- Flag Coat of arms

- Location of the province of Catanzaro in Italy
- Country: Italy
- Region: Calabria
- Capital(s): Catanzaro
- Municipalities: 80

Government
  - President: Amedeo Mormile

Area
  - Total: 2,415.45 km^{2} (932.61 sq mi)

Population (2026)
  - Total: 338,160
  - Density: 140.00/km^{2} (362.60/sq mi)

GDP
  - Total: €6.587 billion (2015)
  - Per capita: €18,127 (2015)
- Time zone: UTC+1 (CET)
  - Summer (DST): UTC+2 (CEST)
- Postal code: 88020, 88021, 88024, 88025, 88040, 88044, 88046, 88050, 88051, 88054, 88056, 88060, 88062, 88064, 88070, 88100
- Telephone prefix: 0961, 0967, 0968
- Vehicle registration: CZ
- ISTAT code: 079

The province of Catanzaro (Italian: provincia di Catanzaro; Catanzarese: pruvincia e Catanzaru) is a province of the region of Calabria in Italy. The capital is the city of Catanzaro, also the capital of the region.

It has a population of 338,160 in an area of 2,415.45 square kilometres (932.61 sq mi) across its 80 municipalities.

Catanzaro contains the Isthmus of Catanzaro between Sant'Eufemia and the Gulf of Squillace. It borders the provinces of Crotone (formed from it in 1996), Cosenza, Reggio Calabria, and Vibo Valentia, and it also borders the Ionian and Tyrrhenian seas to the east and west, respectively.

== History ==
After the last ice age, Stone Age hunter-gatherers lived in this area. By about 3,500 BC they had turned to farming and started settling in villages. In the ninth and eighth centuries BC, Greeks began colonising the coastal regions of Calabria, calling the area Magna Graecia. They brought with them their Hellenic civilization and the olives, figs and vines that are cultivated in the province today.

By the third century BC, the Greeks were conquered by Italic tribes, including a branch of the Samnites called the Bruttii. They established their sovereignty over present day Calabria and founded new cities, including their own capital "Consentia", now known as Cosenza. After their victory in the Pyrrhic War (280–275 BC), the Romans occupied Calabria, and the region remained under their control until the fifth century AD.

After the Visigoths overthrew the Romans, there followed an unsettled period for Calabria. However, by the middle of the sixth century, the Byzantine Empire was in control of southern Italy. The city of Catanzaro was founded by the Byzantines during the tenth century. The city, atop a hill above the Gulf of Squilis, was named Katanrzarion or Catasarion as these derive from the Greek words for "terrace" and "under"; terrace farming took place in the province. The city was fortified in 1055 and a castle was constructed; this allowed it to resist French invasion attempts lasting four months in 1528.

The area of the plateau of La Sila towards the Ionian Sea was settled by immigrants from Albania in the period 1448–1535. They formed an ethnic minority and created the communities known as Sila Greca (Greek Sila).

== Geography ==
The province of Catanzaro is one of the five provinces in the region of Calabria. To the south and east, the province has a coastline on the Ionian Sea, and to the northwest, a coastline on the Tyrrhenian Sea. The Province of Cosenza lies to the north and the Province of Crotone to the east. To the south west lie the provinces of Vibo Valentia and Reggio Calabria. The provincial capital as well as the capital of the region is the city of Catanzaro.

The province occupies both sides of the Calabrian Apennines and has a total area of 5,200 square kilometres (2,000 sq mi). The central part of the province is the isthmus of Catanzaro, a long narrow valley of 30 kilometres (19 mi), connecting the north and south parts of the coastline, the Gulf of Squillace and the Gulf of Saint Euphemia; it is the narrowest part of the whole Italian peninsula. Other parts of the province are mostly mountainous, with steep sided valleys formed by short rivers. The River Ampollino on the boundary with the province of Crotone is impounded to form the Ampollino Lake.

The eastern part of the province forms part of the high plateau of La Sila, about 1,200 m (3,900 ft) above sea level, which covers around 2,000 square kilometres (770 mi^{2}) of territory along the central part of Calabria. The highest point is Botte Donato, which reaches 1,928 metres (6,325 ft). There are large numbers of lakes surrounded by dense coniferous forests. The province includes much of the Sila National Park, a wild area with rough grassland and forests of pine, oak, beech and fir.

In the province of Catanzaro, among San Floro, Girifalco and Cortale, the ancient tradition of sericulture is still kept alive, thanks to young generations.

== Government ==
=== Municipalities ===
The province has 80 municipalities:

- Albi
- Amaroni
- Amato
- Andali
- Argusto
- Badolato
- Belcastro
- Borgia
- Botricello
- Caraffa di Catanzaro
- Cardinale
- Carlopoli
- Catanzaro
- Cenadi
- Centrache
- Cerva
- Chiaravalle Centrale
- Cicala
- Conflenti
- Cortale
- Cropani
- Curinga
- Davoli
- Decollatura
- Falerna
- Feroleto Antico
- Fossato Serralta
- Gagliato
- Gasperina
- Gimigliano
- Girifalco
- Gizzeria
- Guardavalle
- Isca sullo Ionio
- Jacurso
- Lamezia Terme
- Magisano
- Maida
- Marcedusa
- Marcellinara
- Martirano
- Martirano Lombardo
- Miglierina
- Montauro
- Montepaone
- Motta Santa Lucia
- Nocera Terinese
- Olivadi
- Palermiti
- Pentone
- Petrizzi
- Petronà
- Pianopoli
- Platania
- San Floro
- San Mango d'Aquino
- San Pietro a Maida
- San Pietro Apostolo
- San Sostene
- San Vito sullo Ionio
- Sant'Andrea Apostolo dello Ionio
- Santa Caterina dello Ionio
- Satriano
- Sellia
- Sellia Marina
- Serrastretta
- Sersale
- Settingiano
- Simeri Crichi
- Sorbo San Basile
- Soverato
- Soveria Mannelli
- Soveria Simeri
- Squillace
- Stalettì
- Taverna
- Tiriolo
- Torre di Ruggiero
- Vallefiorita
- Zagarise

== Demographics ==
Historical population (current borders)
Year	Pop.	±%
1861	207,625	—
1871	219,464	+5.7%
1881	231,452	+5.5%
1901	260,799	+12.7%
1911	280,269	+7.5%
1921	292,193	+4.3%
1931	308,071	+5.4%
1936	317,230	+3.0%
1951	369,197	+16.4%
1961	374,587	+1.5%
1971	361,187	−3.6%
1981	381,797	+5.7%
1991	382,565	+0.2%
2001	369,578	−3.4%
2011	359,841	−2.6%
2021	343,673	−4.5%
Source: ISTAT

As of 2026, the population is 338,160, of which 49.1% are male, and 50.9% are female. Minors make up 14.7% of the population, and seniors make up 25.7%.

=== Immigration ===
As of 2025, immigrants make up 7.5% of the population. The 5 largest foreign countries of birth are Morocco, Romania, Switzerland, Ukraine, and Germany.

== Economy ==
=== Manufacturing ===
The province of Catanzaro boasts a great tradition in the textile manufacturing, especially silk. Recently, several young people have given new life to this activity, developing sustainable and solidarity economy projects. In fact, among the municipalities of Girifalco, San Floro and Cortale, sericulture is still practiced, the breeding of silkworms combined with the cultivation of mulberry trees.

Tiriolo and Badolato are known above all for the manufacturing of the "vancale", the typical Calabrian shawl, made of wool or silk, worn by women in ancient times on traditional costumes during the dance of tarantella, or as an ornamental decoration of the houses. Typical in Tiriolo is also the manufacturing of carpets, linen and broom fibers, bobbin lace making, embroidery, precious ceramics, furnishing objects and artistic sculptures. The artistic production of weaving is also active in other centers such as in Platania and Petrizzi where once hemp fibers were also produced.

In Soveria Mannelli, Lanificio Leo, the oldest textile factory in Calabria founded in 1873, is still active. The factory still retains majestic and evocative tools dating back to the late nineteenth century.

The traditional production of artistic ceramics dating back to the Magna Graecia period is handed down in the ancient center of Squillace.

The small town Serrastretta, a green village in the woods of Presila, is famous for its wood production, in particular for its chairs characterized by a very original straw.

Sellia Marina, on the other hand, is known for its blown glass manufacturing.

Among many craftsmen there are also those of wrought iron, who work brass, pewter, tin to make balconies, railings, gates, oil lamps, candelabra and plates. Also worth mentioning are the goldsmiths and silversmiths who shape the foils and use the burin to produce earrings, jewels, necklaces, pendants often referring to ancient styles.

== Transport ==
The main transport hub of the province is the central town of Lamezia Terme, located beside the A2 Salerno-Reggio Calabria Motorway. From here, the SS.288 State Route runs to Catanzaro. The town is on the main line leading from Reggio Calabria to Naples, and is a major terminal for goods traffic. Secondary branch lines connect to Catanzaro and Crotone. Near Lamezia Terme is the principal airport of Calabria, the Lamezia Terme International Airport.

== See also ==
- Lake Passante
