= Cerva, Calabria =

Cerva
- Comune
- Comune di Cerva
- Location within Italy Location within Calabria
- Coordinates: 39°01′35″N 16°44′55″E
- Country: Italy
- Region: Calabria
- Province: Catanzaro (CZ)

Area
  - Total: 21 km^{2} (8.1 sq mi)
- Elevation: 850 m (2,790 ft)

Population (31 December 2013)
  - Total: 1,243
  - Density: 59/km^{2} (150/sq mi)
- Time zone: UTC+1 (CET)
  - Summer (DST): UTC+2 (CEST)
- Postal code: 88050
- Dialing code: 0961

Cerva is a village and comune in the province of Catanzaro, in the Calabria region of southern Italy.
