= Martirano Lombardo =

- Comune
- Comune di Martirano Lombardo
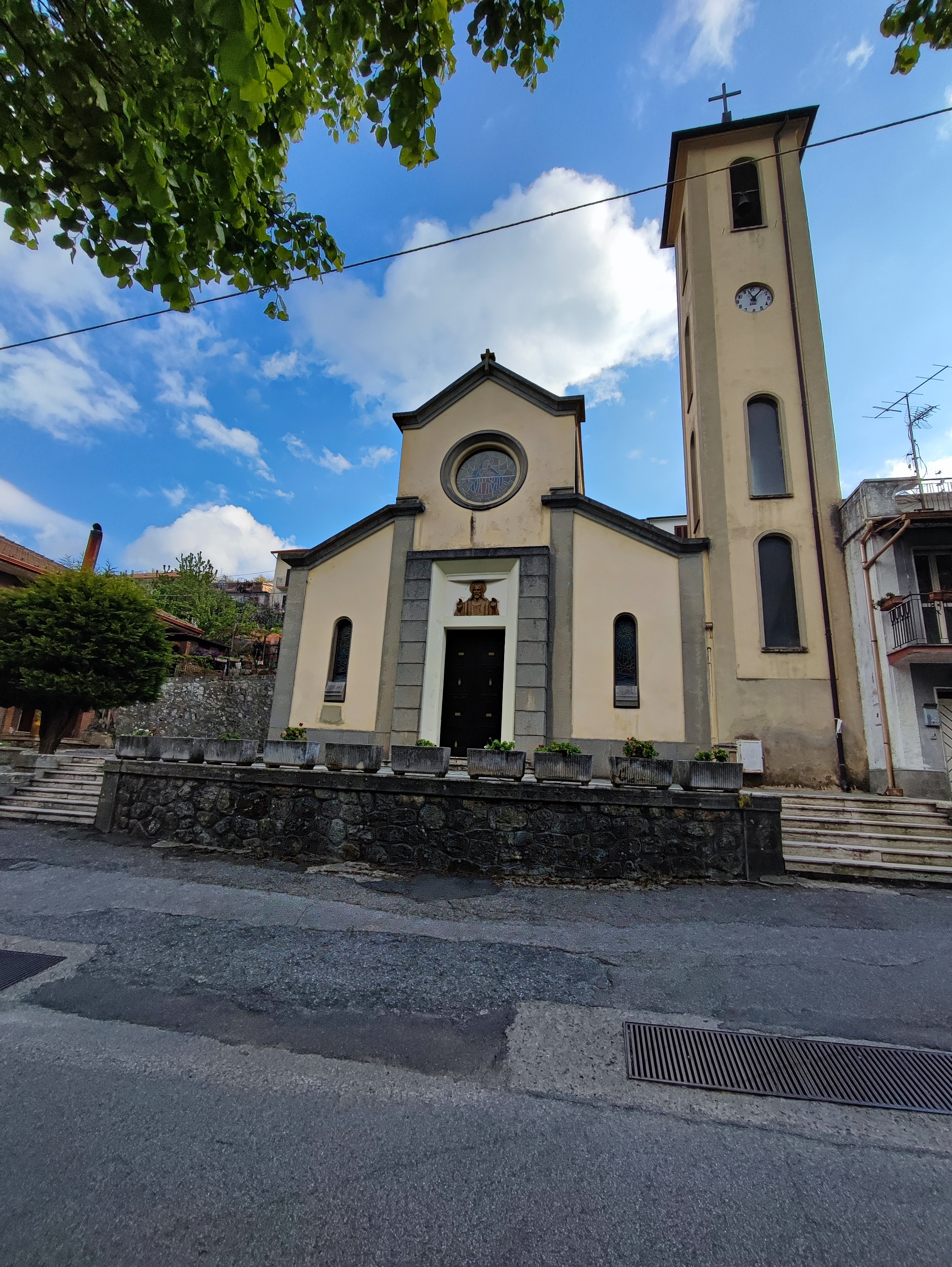

- Location within Italy Location within Calabria
- Coordinates: 39°4′N 16°14′E
- Country: Italy
- Region: Calabria
- Province: Catanzaro (CZ)
- Frazioni: Pietrebianche, San Nicola, Santa Croce Beratta

Government
  - Mayor: Franco Rosario Pucci

Area
  - Total: 19.84 km^{2} (7.66 sq mi)
- Elevation: 560 m (1,840 ft)

Population (30 September 2017)
  - Total: 1,072
  - Density: 54.03/km^{2} (139.9/sq mi)
- Demonym: Martiranesi
- Time zone: UTC+1 (CET)
  - Summer (DST): UTC+2 (CEST)
- Postal code: 88040
- Dialing code: 0968
- Patron saint: Madonna del Carmine
- Saint day: 16 July
- Website: Official website

Matriano Lombardo (Calabrian: Martinàru 'ombardu) is a comune and town in the province of Catanzaro in the Calabria region of southern Italy.
