= Ponte Lambro =

- Comune
- Comune di Ponte Lambro
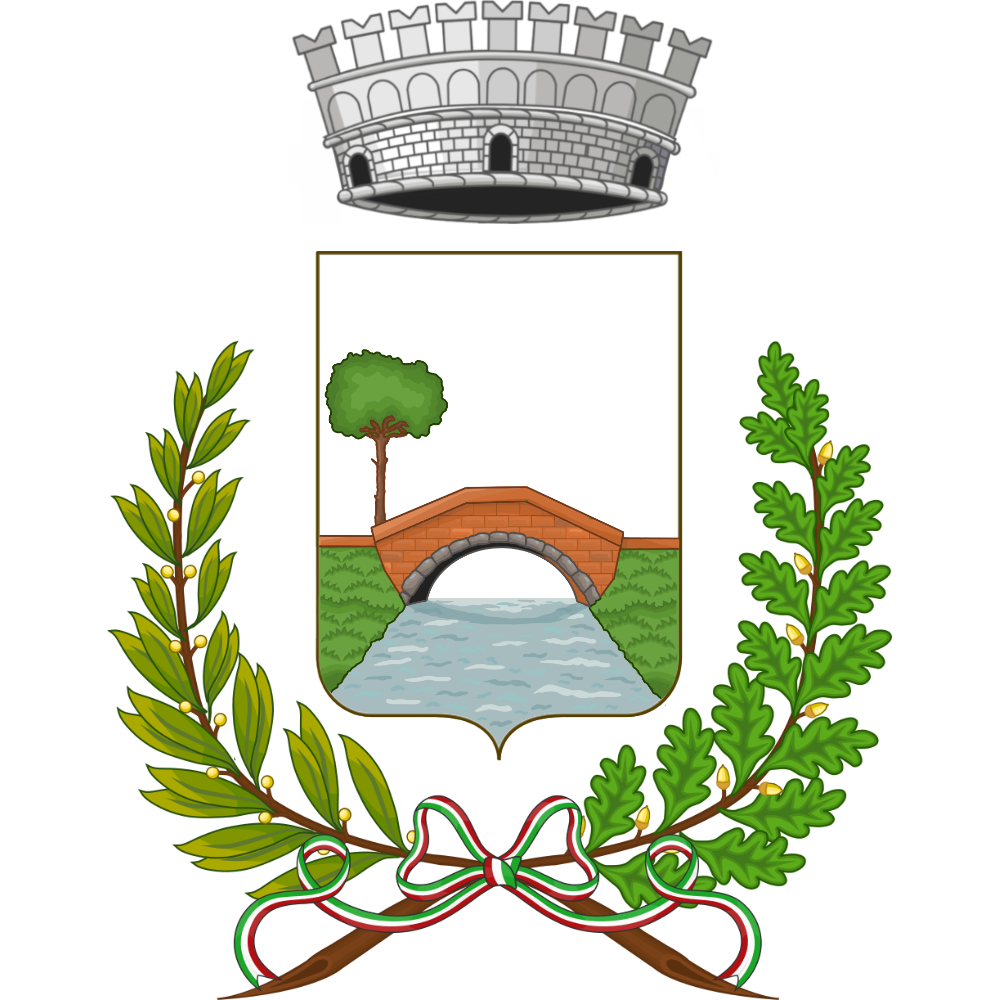
- Coat of arms

- Location within Italy Location within Lombardy
- Coordinates: 45°50′N 9°14′E
- Country: Italy
- Region: Lombardy
- Province: Como (CO)
- Frazioni: Lezza, Mazzonio, Fucina, Schieppo, Busnigallo

Area
  - Total: 3.4 km^{2} (1.3 sq mi)

Population (Dec. 2004)
  - Total: 4,145
  - Density: 1,200/km^{2} (3,200/sq mi)
- Demonym: Pontelambresi
- Time zone: UTC+1 (CET)
  - Summer (DST): UTC+2 (CEST)
- Postal code: 22037
- Dialing code: 031
- Patron saint: S. Maria Annunciata

Ponte Lambro (Brianzöö: Punt [ˈpũːt]) is a comune (municipality) in the Province of Como in the Italian region Lombardy, located about 40 kilometres (25 mi) north of Milan and about 12 kilometres (7 mi) east of Como.

Ponte Lambro borders the following municipalities: Caslino d'Erba, Castelmarte, Erba.

== Demographic evolution ==
Historical population

Year	Pop.	±%
1861	1,257	—
1871	1,231	−2.1%
1881	1,269	+3.1%
1901	1,535	+21.0%
1911	1,662	+8.3%

Year	Pop.	±%
1921	1,596	−4.0%
1931	1,711	+7.2%
1936	1,779	+4.0%
1951	2,320	+30.4%
1961	2,489	+7.3%

Year	Pop.	±%
1971	3,142	+26.2%
1981	3,489	+11.0%
1991	3,866	+10.8%
2001	4,066	+5.2%

Source: Data from ISTAT

== Sports ==
The Associazione Sportiva Dilettantistica Pontelambrese, commonly known as Pontelambrese, is an amateur football club founded on July 26, 1974, and based in Ponte Lambro.

== Twin towns ==
- Zawiercie, Poland, since 2004
- Kamianets-Podilskyi, Ukraine, since 2006
- Cortale, Italy, since 2010
- Carbone, Italy, since 2010
