= Argusto =

Argusto Άργυστος (Greek)
- Comune
- Comune di Argusto
- Location within Italy Location within Calabria
- Coordinates: 38°41′N 16°26′E
- Country: Italy
- Region: Calabria
- Province: Catanzaro (CZ)

Government
  - Mayor: Valter Matozzo

Area
  - Total: 6.88 km^{2} (2.66 sq mi)
- Elevation: 530 m (1,740 ft)

Population (30 April 2017)
  - Total: 512
  - Density: 74.4/km^{2} (193/sq mi)
- Demonym: Argustesi
- Time zone: UTC+1 (CET)
  - Summer (DST): UTC+2 (CEST)
- Postal code: 88060
- Dialing code: 0967
- Website: Official website

Argusto (Greek: Argystos) is a comune and town in the province of Catanzaro in the Calabria region of southern Italy.
