= Botricello =

- Comune
- Comune di Botricello
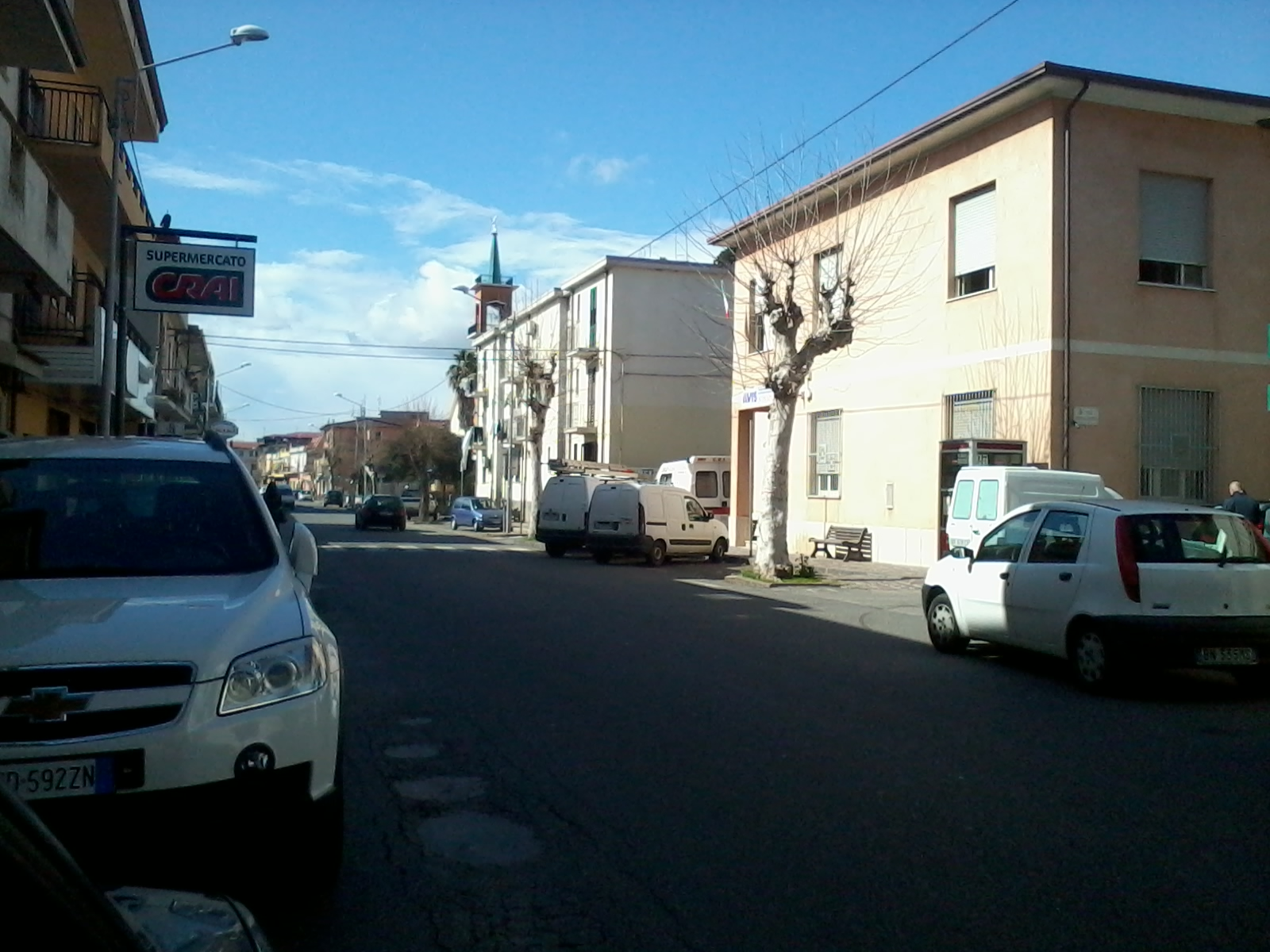

- Location within Italy Location within Calabria
- Coordinates: 38°56′N 16°51′E
- Country: Italy
- Region: Calabria
- Province: Catanzaro (CZ)

Government
  - Mayor: Saverio Simone Puccio

Area
  - Total: 15.48 km^{2} (5.98 sq mi)
- Elevation: 19 m (62 ft)

Population (31 December 2022)
  - Total: 5,010
  - Density: 324/km^{2} (838/sq mi)
- Demonym: Botricellesi
- Time zone: UTC+1 (CET)
  - Summer (DST): UTC+2 (CEST)
- Postal code: 88070
- Dialing code: 0961
- Website: Official website

Botricello (Calabrian: Votricèdu) is a town and comune in the province of Catanzaro, in the Calabria region of southern Italy.
