= Caraffa di Catanzaro =

- Comune
- Comune di Caraffa di Catanzaro
- Location within Italy Location within Calabria
- Coordinates: 38°52′55″N 16°29′15″E
- Country: Italy
- Region: Calabria
- Province: Catanzaro (CZ)

Government
  - Mayor: Antonio Giuseppe Sciumbata

Area
  - Total: 25.05 km^{2} (9.67 sq mi)
- Elevation: 450 m (1,480 ft)

Population (31 December 2013)
  - Total: 1,920
  - Density: 76.6/km^{2} (199/sq mi)
- Time zone: UTC+1 (CET)
  - Summer (DST): UTC+2 (CEST)
- Postal code: 88050
- Dialing code: 0961
- Website: Official website

Caraffa di Catanzaro (Arbëreshë Albanian: Garrafë) is an Arbëreshë town and comune in the province of Catanzaro in the Calabria region of southern Italy.
