= Jacurso =

Jacurso Iákyrsos (Greek)
- Comune
- Comune di Jacurso
- Location within Italy Location within Calabria
- Coordinates: 38°50′45″N 16°22′50″E
- Country: Italy
- Region: Calabria
- Province: Catanzaro (CZ)

Area
  - Total: 21 km^{2} (8.1 sq mi)
- Elevation: 441 m (1,447 ft)

Population (31 December 2013)
  - Total: 638
  - Density: 30/km^{2} (79/sq mi)
- Demonym: Jacursesi
- Time zone: UTC+1 (CET)
  - Summer (DST): UTC+2 (CEST)
- Postal code: 88020
- Dialing code: 0968
- Patron saint: San Sebastiano
- Saint day: 20 January
- Website: Official website

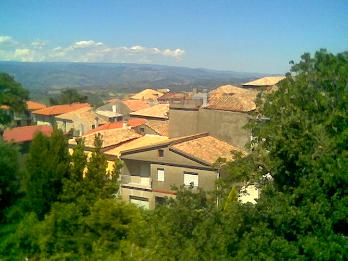
Photo of Jacurso

Jacurso (Calabrian: Jicùrzu; Greek: Iakyrsos) is a village and comune in the province of Catanzaro in the Calabria region of southern Italy.

The village is renowned for its production of homemade ice cream.
