= Pentone =

- Comune
- Comune di Pentone
- Location within Italy Location within Calabria
- Coordinates: 38°59′10″N 16°35′0″E
- Country: Italy
- Region: Calabria
- Province: Catanzaro (CZ)
- Frazioni: S. Elia, Visconte

Area
  - Total: 12 km^{2} (4.6 sq mi)
- Elevation: 648 m (2,126 ft)

Population (31 December 2013)
  - Total: 2,161
  - Density: 180/km^{2} (470/sq mi)
- Demonym: Pentonesi
- Time zone: UTC+1 (CET)
  - Summer (DST): UTC+2 (CEST)
- Postal code: 88050
- Dialing code: 0961
- Patron saint: Madonna di termine
- Saint day: 2nd Sunday of September

Pentone is a town and comune of the province of Catanzaro in the Calabria region of southern Italy.
