= Sant'Andrea Apostolo dello Ionio =

- Comune
- Comune di Sant'Andrea Apostolo dello Ionio
- Location within Italy Location within Calabria
- Coordinates: 38°37′N 16°32′E
- Country: Italy
- Region: Calabria
- Province: Catanzaro (CZ)
- Frazioni: Contrada Taverna, Fego, Sant'Andrea Ionio Marina[1]

Government
  - Mayor: Nicola Ramogida

Area
  - Total: 20 km^{2} (7.7 sq mi)
- Elevation: 312 m (1,024 ft)

Population (31 December 2013)
  - Total: 2,020
  - Density: 100/km^{2} (260/sq mi)
- Demonym: Andreolesi
- Time zone: UTC+1 (CET)
  - Summer (DST): UTC+2 (CEST)
- Postal code: 88066
- Dialing code: 0967
- Patron saint: Saint Andrew the Apostle
- Saint day: 30 November
- Website: Official website

Sant'Andrea Apostolo dello lonio (lit. 'Saint Andrew the Apostle on the Ionian Sea'), locally referred to as simply Sant'Andrea, is a comune and town in the province of Catanzaro in the region of Calabria, Italy.

== Geography ==
The town is bordered by the river Alaca to the north, the Ionian Sea to the east, the river Salùbro in the south, and the foothills of the Calabrian Apennines in the west. The village lies in the hills of La Maddalena and Lipantana Cerasia. The municipal hall sits at an elevation of 330 meters above sea level.
