= Amaroni =

Amaroni Αμαρονοί (Greek)
- Comune
- Comune di Amaroni
- Coat of arms

- Location within Italy Location within Calabria
- Coordinates: 38°47′35″N 16°27′00″E
- Country: Italy
- Region: Calabria
- Province: Catanzaro (CZ)

Government
  - Mayor: Luigi Ruggiero

Area
  - Total: 9.88 km^{2} (3.81 sq mi)
- Elevation: 365 m (1,198 ft)

Population (2019)
  - Total: 1 773
  - Density: 0.10/km^{2} (0.26/sq mi)
- Demonym: Amaronesi
- Time zone: UTC+1 (CET)
  - Summer (DST): UTC+2 (CEST)
- Postal code: 88050
- Dialing code: 0961
- Patron saint: Saint Barbara
- Saint day: 31 July, 4 December
- Website: Official website

Amaroni (Calabrian: Lamàruni; Greek: Amaronoi) is a town and comune in the province of Catanzaro, in the Calabria region of southern Italy.

== Twin towns ==
- Risch-Rotkreuz, Switzerland
