= Cicala =

- Comune
- Comune di Cicala
- Location within Italy Location within Calabria
- Coordinates: 39°01′15″N 16°29′20″E
- Country: Italy
- Region: Calabria
- Province: Catanzaro (CZ)

Government
  - Mayor: Alessandro Falvo

Area
  - Total: 9.28 km^{2} (3.58 sq mi)
- Elevation: 837 m (2,746 ft)

Population (31 December 2013)
  - Total: 964
  - Density: 104/km^{2} (269/sq mi)
- Demonym: Cicalesi
- Time zone: UTC+1 (CET)
  - Summer (DST): UTC+2 (CEST)
- Postal code: 88040
- Dialing code: 0968
- Patron saint: St. James
- Saint day: 25 July
- Website: Official website

Cicala is a village and comune in the province of Catanzaro, in the Calabria region of southern Italy.
