= Petronà =

- Comune
- Comune di Petronà
- Location within Italy Location within Calabria
- Coordinates: 39°2′N 16°45′E
- Country: Italy
- Region: Calabria
- Province: Province of Catanzaro (CZ)
- Frazioni: Arietta

Government
  - Mayor: Commissar

Area
  - Total: 45.5 km^{2} (17.6 sq mi)
- Elevation: 889 m (2,917 ft)

Population (2013)
  - Total: 2,667
  - Density: 58.6/km^{2} (152/sq mi)
- Demonym: Petronesi
- Time zone: UTC+1 (CET)
  - Summer (DST): UTC+2 (CEST)
- Postal code: 88050
- Dialing code: 0961
- Patron saint: S.S. Pietro e Paolo
- Website: Official website

Petronà (Calabrian: Petrunà) is a comune and town in the province of Catanzaro in the Calabria region of Italy. As of 2013 it had an estimated population of 2,667.
