= Cropani =

Cropani Ancient Greek: Krópos
- Comune
- Comune di Cropani
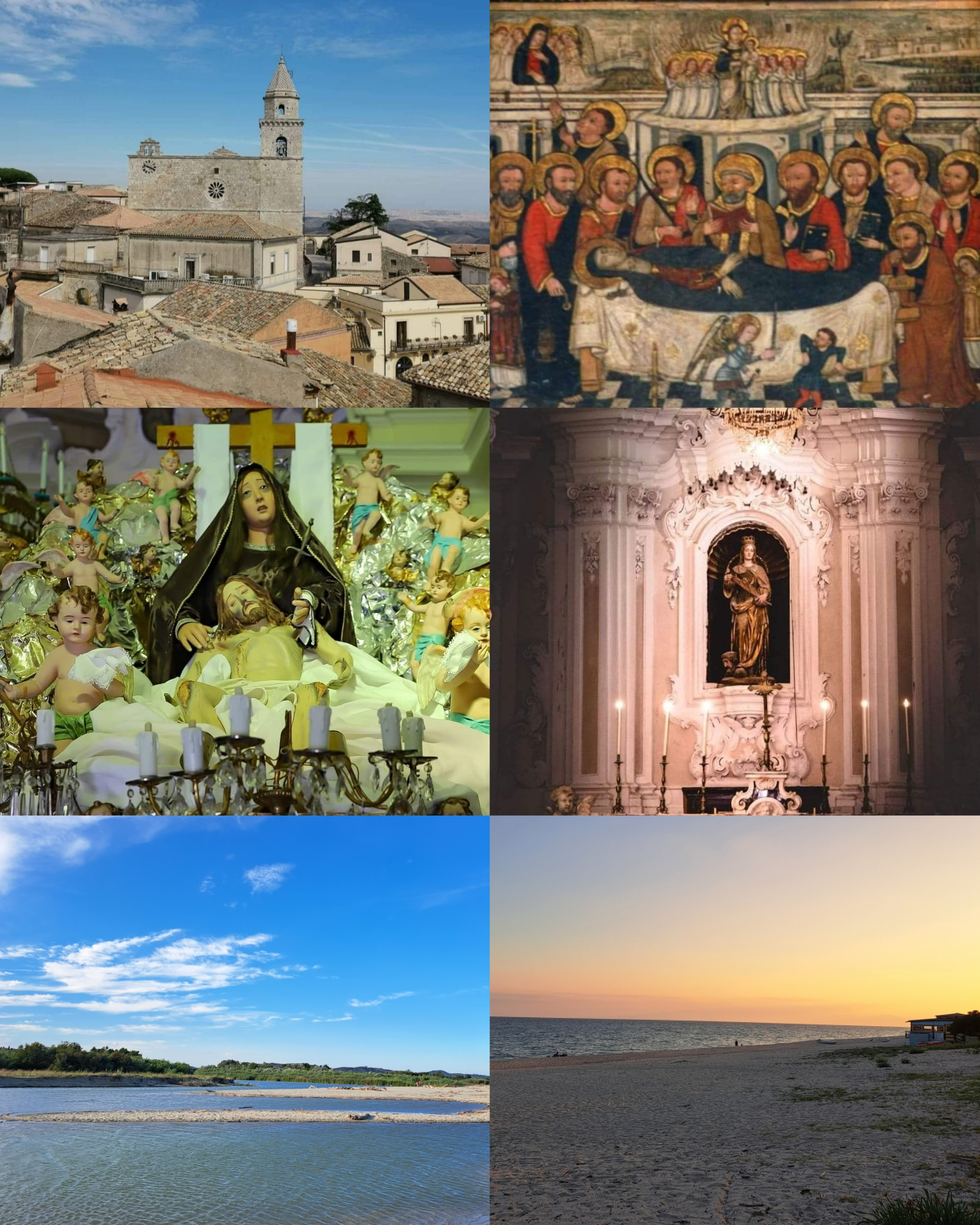
- On the left, from the top: the historical center, the "Naca", the mouth of River Crocchio; On the right, from the top: the "Dormitio Virginis", the church of Santa Caterina, the beach in Cropani Marina

- Location within Italy Location within Calabria
- Coordinates: 38°58′N 16°47′E
- Country: Italy
- Region: Calabria
- Province: Catanzaro (CZ)
- Frazioni: Cropani Marina, Cuturella

Government
  - Mayor: Raffaele Mercurio

Area
  - Total: 44.81 km^{2} (17.30 sq mi)
- Elevation: 347 m (1,138 ft)

Population (2013)
  - Total: 4,701
  - Density: 104.9/km^{2} (271.7/sq mi)
- Demonym: Cropanesi
- Time zone: UTC+1 (CET)
  - Summer (DST): UTC+2 (CEST)
- Postal code: 88051
- Dialing code: 0961
- Patron saint: Saint Sebastian
- Saint day: 20 January
- Website: Official website

Cropani is a comune and town in the province of Catanzaro in the Calabria region of Italy. The comune is located 10 km (6.2 mi) from the sea and 13 km (8.1 mi) from the Sila. Two frazioni are part of the municipal territory: Cropani Marina and Cuturella di Cropani. According to tradition, on 831 AD the ship carrying the relics of Mark the Evangelist from Alexandria to Venice found refuge on the coasts of Cropani. In gratitude, the captain gave the city a relic preserved in its Romanesque Collegiate.

== Geography ==
A part from the historical centre (situated on a 350 m hill) the comune includes two frazioni (Cropani Marina and Cuturella di Cropani)

Cropani Marina is situated along State Road 106 Jonica. The initial settlements developed around the current Piazza Alcide Cervi, near the railway station. The town then expanded towards the Ionian coast. Cropani Marina borders the municipalities of Sellia Marina and Botricello, which are also traversed by SS106.

Cuturella di Cropani is a small medieval village located a few kilometers from Cropani. It is situated between the Crocchio River and the municipalities of Andali and Cerva. Some sources suggest that Cuturella's origins date back to the mid-15th century.

The Crocchio river flows through the municipal territory. The river flows into the beach of Cropani Marina (Torre del Crocchio), creating an interesting naturalistic area.

== History ==
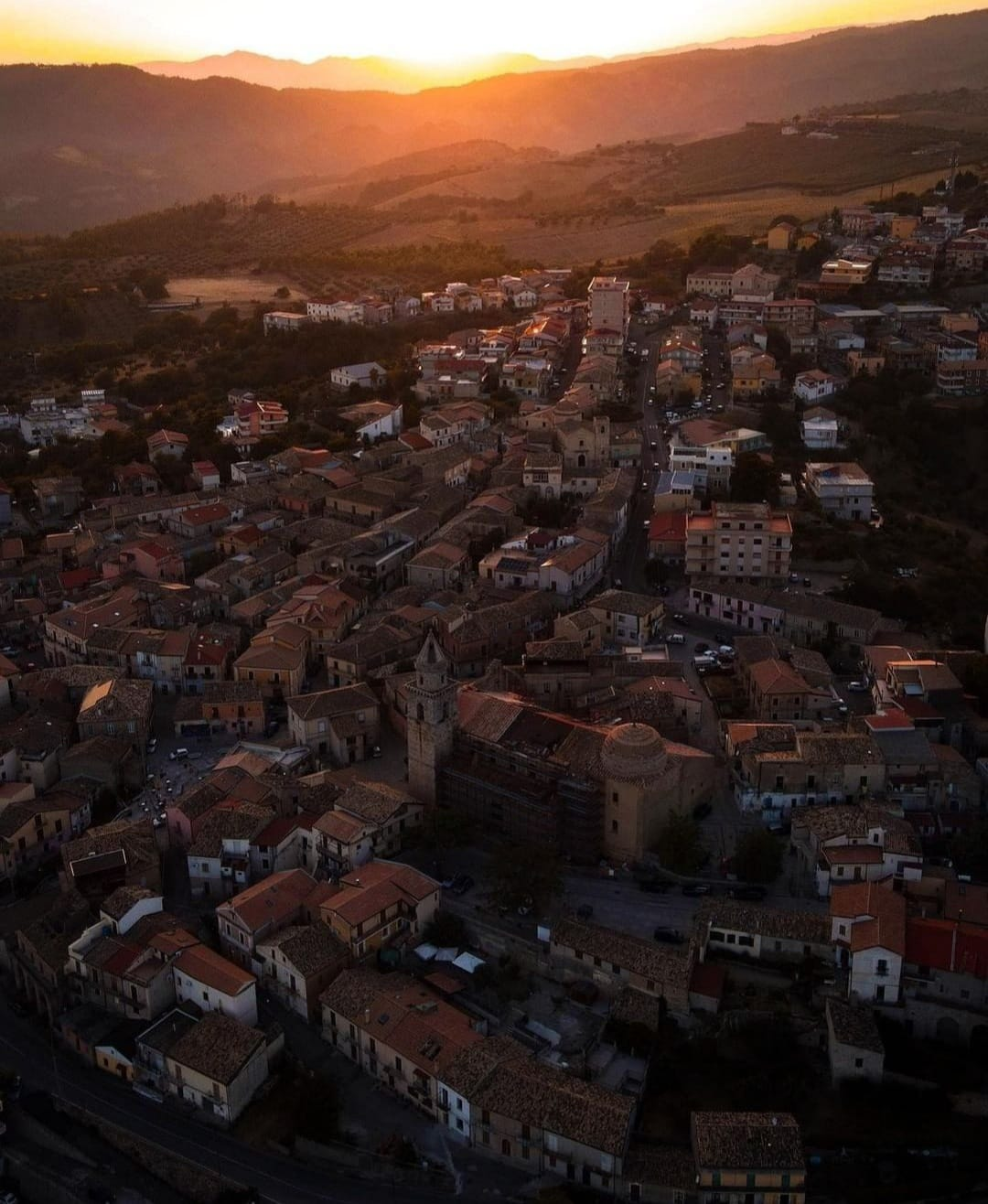
Landscape of Cropani

=== Origins ===
The word "Cropani" derives from the Greek "kropos", which literally means "manure", in the meaning of "rich, fertile land". Archaeological excavations conducted in the Acqua di Friso area in the late 1990s revealed the presence of an ancient Greek sanctuary dating back to the 6th-5th centuries BC. Other excavations in the Basilicata area have uncovered a Roman villa from the 2nd-1st centuries BC. The combination of these findings indicates that the territory of Cropani has been inhabited since ancient times. Further excavations in the Basilicata area have revealed an ancient Byzantine necropolis, complete with a small adjoining basilica. This discovery suggests the existence of a small village in the 6th century. Although the exact origins of Cropani remain uncertain, archaeological evidence leans toward a Byzantine foundation in the 6th century, a period when Basilian monks are believed to have chosen this location for its strategic advantages in defending against foreign attacks. It is speculated that the town already existed around 800 AD. In this regard, historian Giovanni Fiore, in his work "Della Calabria illustrata", recounts that in the year 831, a group of Venetian merchants arrived near Cropani after returning from Alexandria in Egypt, where they had retrieved the remains of Saint Mark the Evangelist. According to this account, their ship encountered a violent storm and sank near the shores of Cropani. The local inhabitants assisted the merchants, who, in gratitude, gifted them a fragment of Saint Mark's right kneecap, which is still preserved in the Collegiate Church of Santa Maria Assunta. Later, the Venetians granted the people of Cropani honorary citizenship of Venice.

=== Middle Age ===
In 1050, Norman rule replaced Byzantine control, marking the beginning of a long feudal period. By 1240, under the D'Aquino counts, Cropani became part of the County of Belcastro. It was likely during this period that the most significant and imposing monument in the area was constructed: the Collegiate Church of Santa Maria Assunta, a notable example of Romanesque architecture. In 1375, Cropani gained autonomy and was governed by the barons of the Ruffo family. After a series of changing lords, Alfonso V of Aragon incorporated Cropani into the Royal Demesne by royal decree in 1444. The powerful Neapolitan Sanseverino family held lordship for a brief period from 1460 to 1465, after which Ferdinand I returned Cropani to the Royal Demesne. The governance then passed to Ferdinando di Guevara, who held it until 1486. During this time, Cropani emerged as a significant spiritual center. Numerous convents were established in the area, though today only ruins remain, with the exception of the Convent of Santa Maria degli Angeli (17th century), which is still operational. Among the notable religious figures from this period is Blessed Paolo De Ambrosis, a member of the Third Regular Order of Saint Francis, born in Cropani in 1432. In 1527, Cropani was sacked by the French, and the following year, it was struck by a plague that claimed 1,400 lives. In the 16th century, it came under Spanish rule, with Costanza d'Avalos selling it to her nephew Alfonso in 1541, who then sold it to Ferrante d'Aragona the following year. In 1562, Cropani was burned by the Turks, and a year later, it was sacked by the men of the brigand Marco Berardi, known as King Marcone. On July 13, 1586, Cropani suffered another attack by the Turks, leaving the town half-destroyed.

=== Modern Age ===
Many other lords governed Cropani until 1806, including Pietrantonio Ferrari, followed by the Sersale family and later the Ravaschieri between 1615 and 1701. Eventually, the town came under the dominion of the De Fiore family from Nicastro. The earthquake of 1783 caused some damage to the buildings, as evidenced by the subsequent internal renovation of the Collegiata dell'Assunta. In 1807, Cropani was incorporated into the Government of Belcastro, and by 1811, it was elevated to the status of a Municipality and became the Capital of the District. In 1946, Cropani Marina was officially added to the municipality, having previously been divided between the municipalities of Albi and Magisano.

== Landmarks ==
The artistic heart of Cropani is embodied by the romanesque Collegiate Church and six other minor churches. Among the notable civil structures are several historic buildings, the Crocchio watchtower, and the Ancient Gate, which once marked the entrance to the town's historic center.

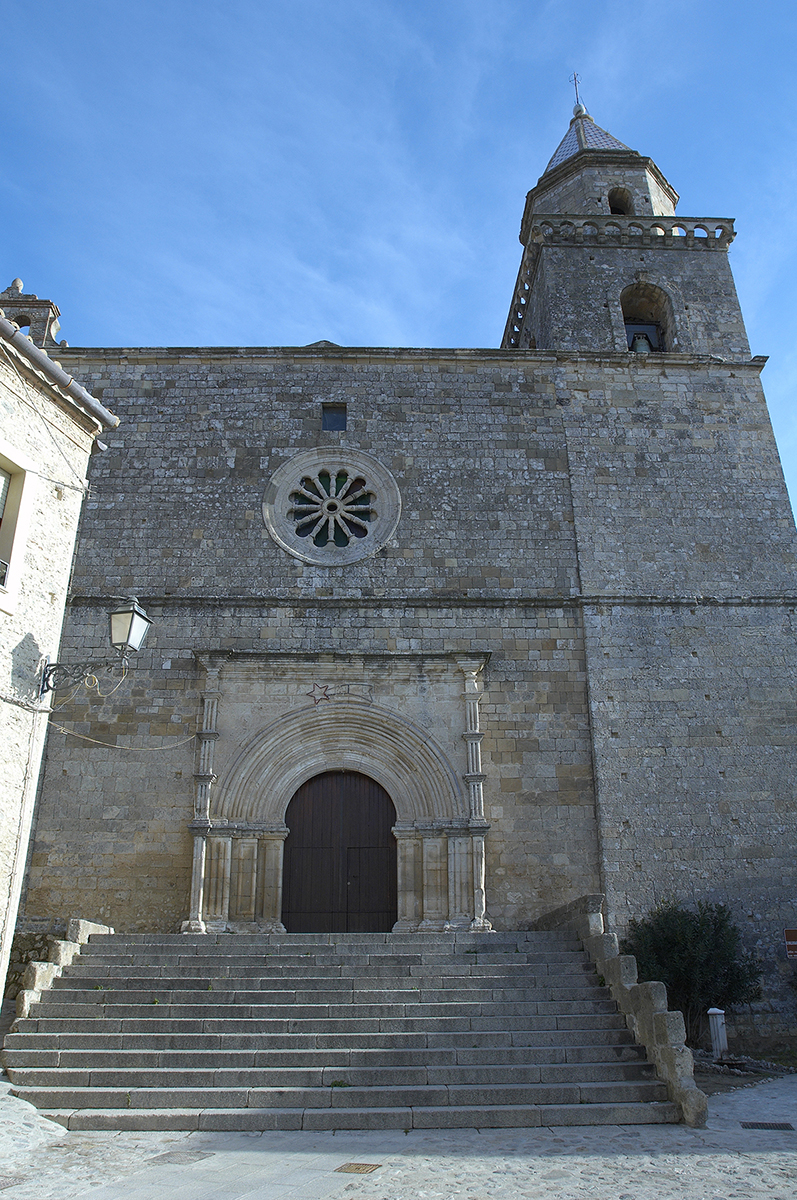
The Collegiate Church of the Assumption

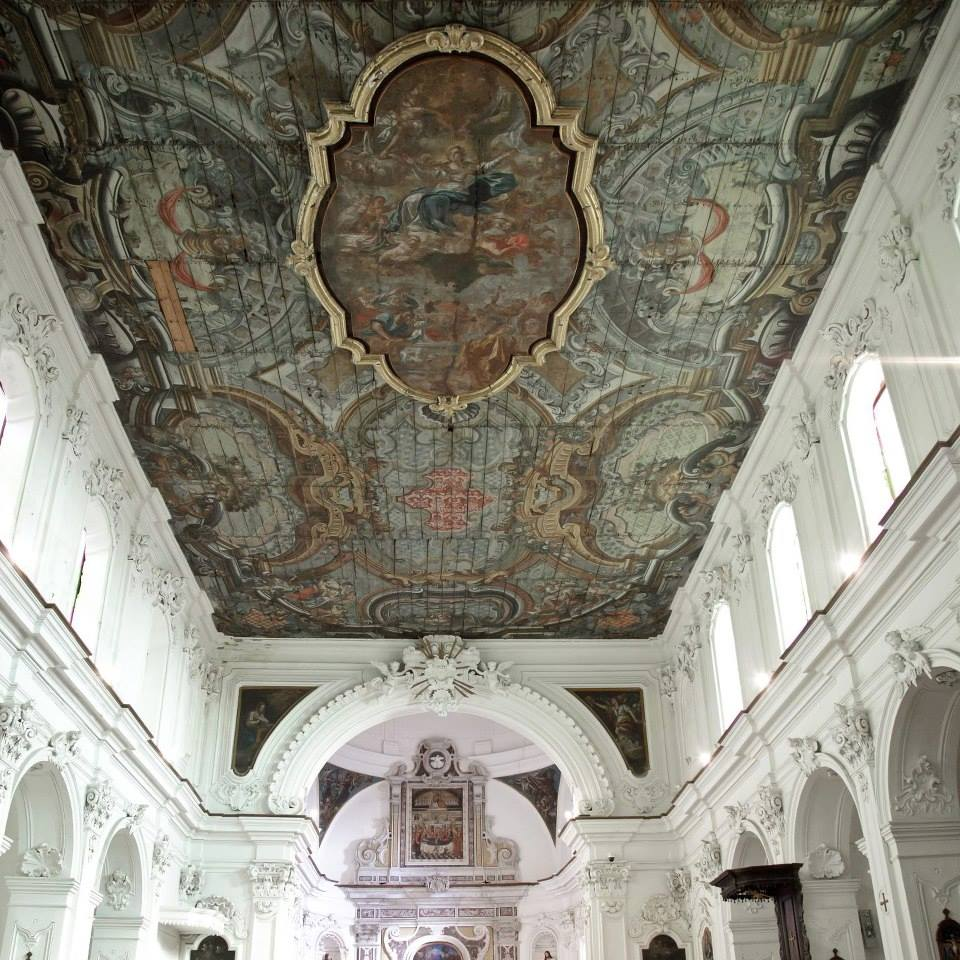
The interior of the Collegiate Church of the Assumption

=== Collegiate Church of the Assumption ===
The Collegiate, also known as the Church of the Assumption, is a monumental building whose origins likely date back to the 13th century. Despite the building's grandeur, no historical records have survived to precisely date its construction. Most scholars agree that it was built in the 14th century. The church is distinguished by its imposing bell tower, which originally stood 47 meters high but now reaches only 32 meters. The bell tower culminates in an eight-sided pyramidal spire covered in majolica. The façade of the church is built from local stone, including sandstone, limestone, and tuff. A granite staircase leads up to the main portal, which consists of four concentric round tuff arches framed by two columns and an architrave. Above the portal is a Gothic rose window with twelve radial columns, a symbol of the municipality of Cropani. The side façade features a secondary portal carved from stone (16th century), with fluted pilasters and a broken tympanum from which a gorgoneion-like element emerges. The interior of the church, featuring a single nave that converges in a large arch towards the apse, was largely rebuilt in the 18th century following earthquakes that struck Calabria. The interior boasts ten lateral arches on pilasters with composite capitals, corresponding to chapels, all decorated in Baroque-style stucco. The Church of the Assumption houses several notable works of art, including statues, relics, 18th-century Baroque paintings, and a remarkable arabesque wooden ceiling. At the center of the ceiling is "The Glory of Mary Assumed into Heaven," an ellipsoidal 18th-century canvas by Giuseppe Pascaletti. Cristoforo Santanna is responsible for "The Expulsion of the Money Changers from the Temple," a majestic panoramic canvas displayed on the internal wall of the main portal. However, the most artistically and historically significant work in the church is the "Dormitio Virginis," a 15th-century panel of Byzantine craftsmanship with Catalan influences, displayed on the high altar. According to legend, the painting arrived in Cropani under miraculous circumstances. A ship, which had docked on the shores of Cropani to gather wood from the Sila, carried the painting that had been stolen from Constantinople and was said to have been painted by Saint Luke himself. After refueling, the ship was unable to leave due to adverse weather conditions. One of the sailors dreamed of the Madonna, who ordered that the painting be left in the Collegiate Church of Cropani. Once this was done, the ship was able to set sail. The painting's iconography is faithful to Byzantine tradition, developed on three levels. A similar composition is found in a 16th-century fresco in the Cattolica of Stilo. The events surrounding this painting are intriguingly similar to those related to the kneecap of Saint Mark, also preserved in the church and gifted to the people of Cropani by Venetian merchants, underscoring Cropani's role as a bridge between East and West. The high altar of the Collegiate Church, made of colored marble, was created by Silvestro Trocoli in the 18th century in the Neapolitan Baroque style. Behind the altar is an 18th-century wooden choir with twelve seats, where the twelve canons of the Collegiate Church once sat. Behind one of these seats is a secret passage leading to hidden rooms inside the dome via spiral staircases. The apse is covered by an imposing dome, decorated on the outside with tiles arranged in reverse.

=== Church of Saint Lucy ===
The Church of Saint Lucy, dating back to the 13th century, is the oldest religious building still in use in the country. Located in the historic center on the perimeter of Piazza Casolini, the church was restored in 1971. Ecclesiastical sources suggest that it was built as a chapel for the Cosentino family of Catanzaro, whose coat of arms is visible on the façade, topped by a marble papal coat of arms from the 16th century, signifying the church's spiritual connection to the Roman basilica of San Giovanni in Laterano. The façade also features two massive single-lancet windows in Byzantine style, while the arched entrance portal is made of granite. Inside, the church is characterized by an ancient wooden ceiling with colored coffers.

=== Church of Saint Catherine ===
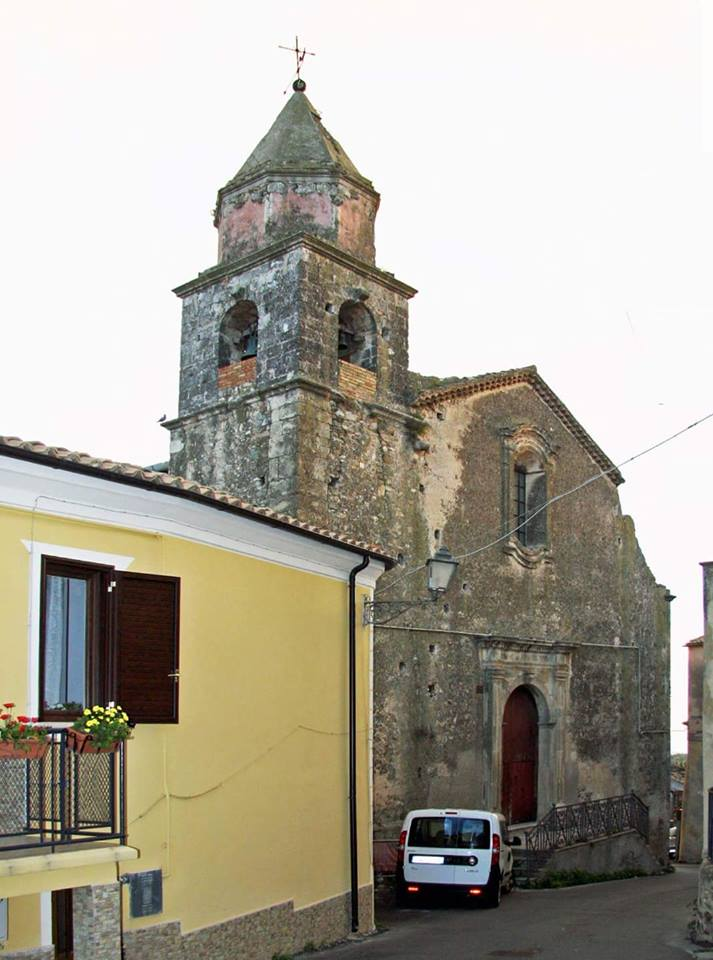
The church of Saint Catherine

The Church of Saint Catherine dates back to the early 16th century and is part of a monumental complex that includes the Church of Saint Anne, the premises of the current Antiquarium of Cropani, and an ancient furnace where ceramics and metal materials were worked between the 16th and 17th centuries. The church underwent renovations following the earthquakes of 1638 and 1783. The entrance portal, made of granite, is preceded by a large balcony and topped by a large mixtilinear window. The interior features a single nave with a square-based apse, decorated with Baroque stucco. The high altar, made of polychrome marble, is an example of the Neapolitan school from the 18th century, and behind it stands a gilded wooden statue of Saint Catherine, dating from the 16th century. Among the altars, the one dedicated to Saint Joseph, crafted in inlaid and colored wood in the Franciscan style, is particularly notable.

=== Church of Saint John ===
Dating back to the end of the 16th century, the Church of Saint John, along with the ancient Pilgrims' Hospital (which was extensively remodeled in the 20th century), forms a significant monumental complex. Adjacent to the façade is a tall square-based bell tower housing a pair of bells. Three stone steps lead up to the grand granite portal. An inscription inside the church, above the choir, indicates that the building was restored in 1752, likely due to a collapse. A round arch precedes the high altar, which features a notable 17th-century canvas titled "The Baptism of Christ," attributed to the painter Andrea Vaccaro. The church also houses the Naca (the dead Christ), a magnificent 18th-century Neapolitan-style throne adorned with damask, silk, crystals, and diamonds, with the grieving Madonna holding her dead son in her lap. This Naca is carried in procession through the town on Good Friday, accompanied by the local musical band and traditional Passion of Christ songs. The church also contains several paintings from the 18th and 19th centuries.

=== Church of Saint Mary of the Angels ===
The Church of Sain Mary of the Angels, commonly known as the Church of Saint Anthony, is located to the north of the town. It forms part of the Capuchin Convent complex, which was established in 1619. The church features a simple façade with a round-arched stone portal, topped by a large square window. Inside, the church houses a precious 17th-century canvas depicting the Madonna degli Angeli flanked by Saint Francis of Assisi and Saint Bonaventure of Bagnoregio. This painting is set within an inlaid wooden altar in the Franciscan style. The Convent also includes an ancient cloister with a well.

== Culture ==
=== Cuisine ===
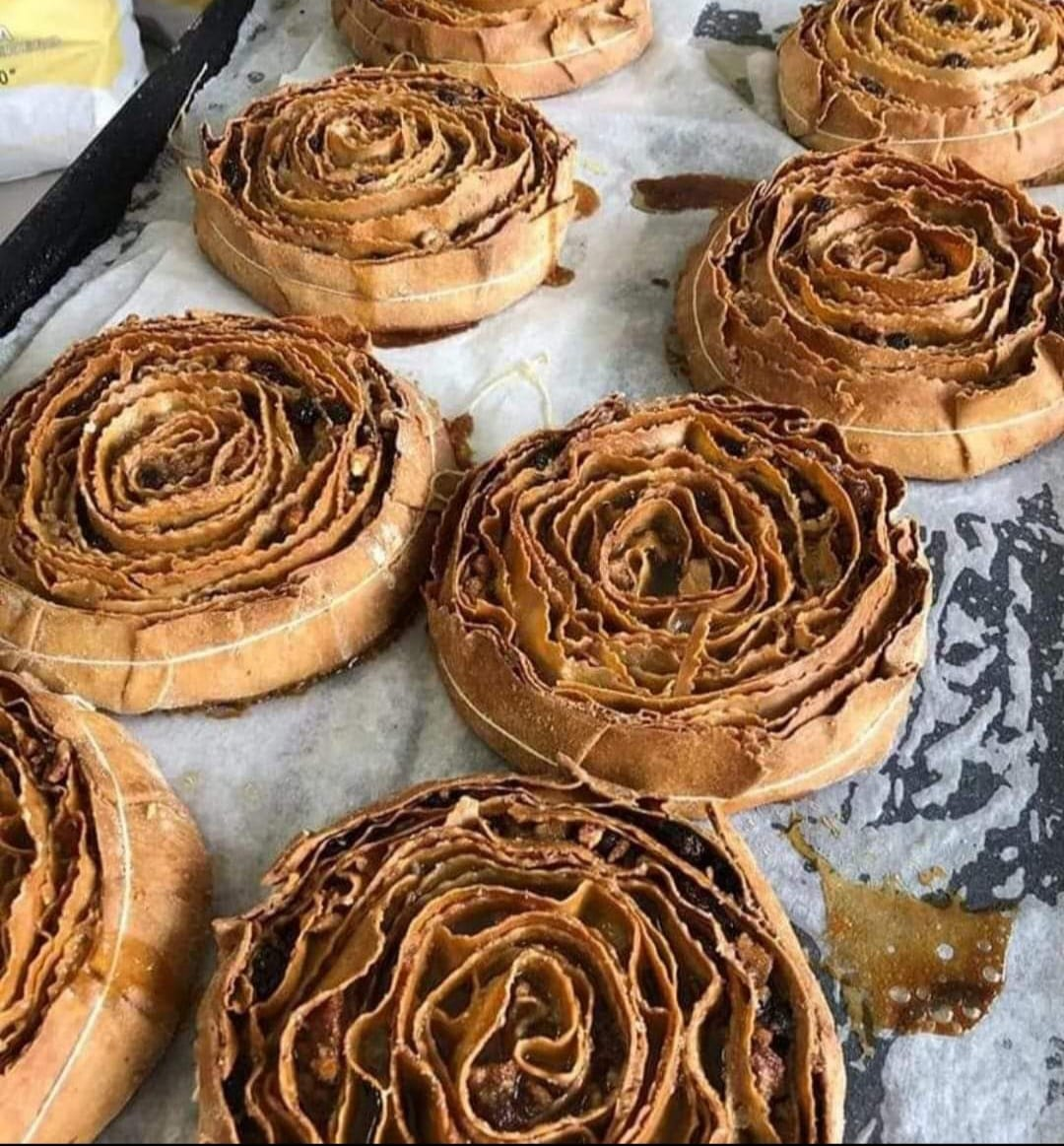
Typical pittanchiuse of Cropani

During autumn, the focus is on oil production from olives harvested in the numerous olive groves of the Cropani hills. Additionally, chestnut drying and mushroom gathering are key activities, leading to the preparation of various preserves. Winter, particularly around Christmas, features the preparation of stuffed aubergines and savory crespelle. From pig a variety of products such as sausages, capicollo, black pudding, resimoglie (or frisuli), jelly, and frittole is produced. Christmas also brings an array of traditional sweets, including pitta'nchiuse, sugared crespelle, and pignolate. In spring, Easter traditions involve the preparation of special sweets, with cuzzupa being the most famous, linked to gift-giving rituals between engaged couples.

Summer is the season for making jams and typical liqueurs, such as citratella and lime liqueur. It's also the time for harvesting oregano and preparing various tomato and pepper preserves. Overall, the local diet features products derived from flour, such as durum wheat bread, pitta, and fresh pasta varieties like mparrettati and covatelli. Dairy products from sheep's milk, including ricotta, pecorino, and giuncata, are staples, along with simple dishes made from legumes and cereals. This rich variety of traditional products is celebrated in numerous village festivals, usually organized to coincide with local festivities.
