= Ampollino Lake =

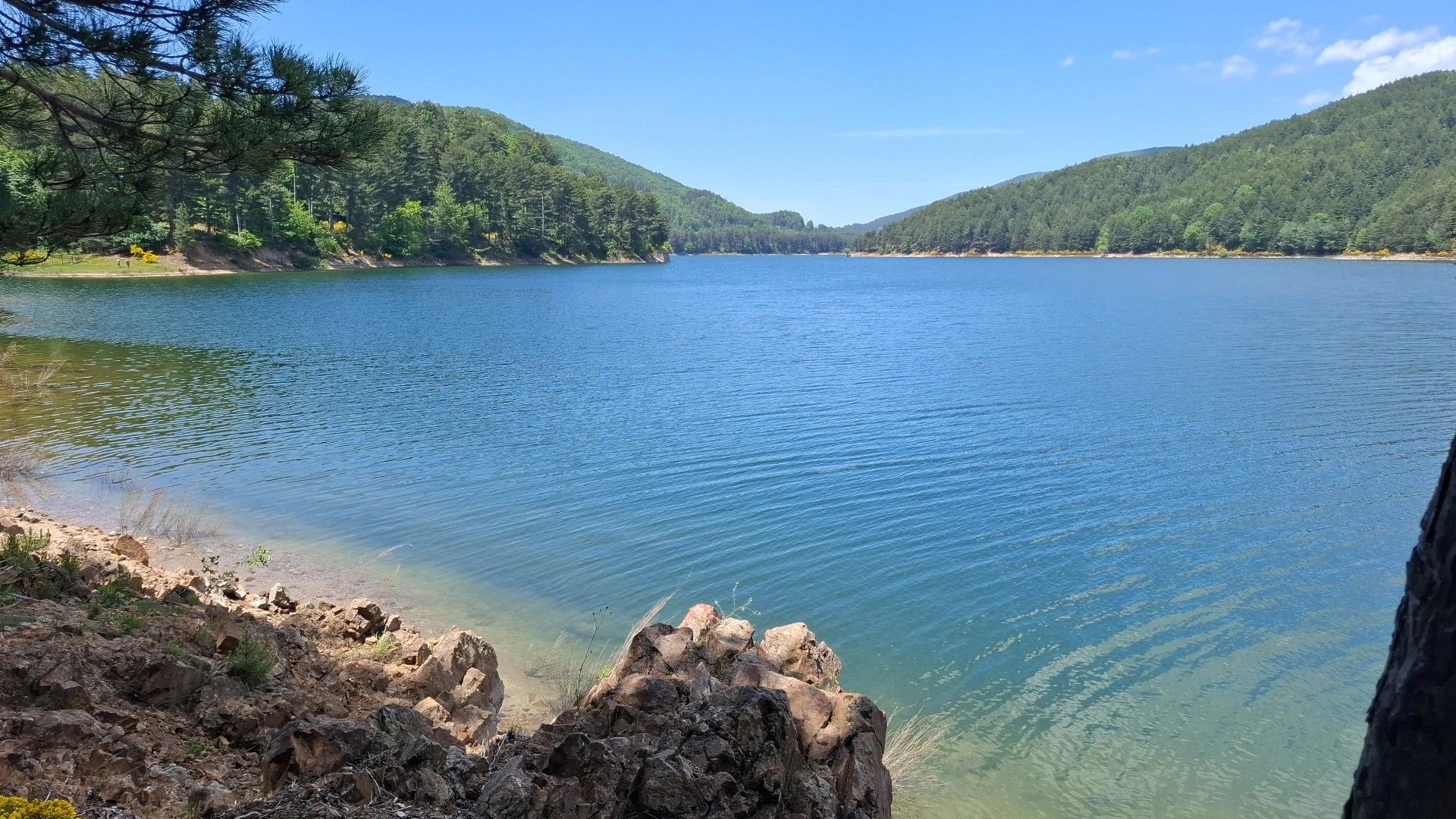

- Location within Italy
- Location: Province of Catanzaro/Province of Cosenza/Province of Crotone, Calabria
- Coordinates: 39°12′N 16°38′E
- Type: reservoir
- Primary inflows: Ampollino
- Primary outflows: Ampollino
- Basin countries: Italy
- Surface area: 5.59 km^{2} (2.16 sq mi)
- Water volume: 68,000,000 m^{3} (55,000 acre⋅ft)
- Surface elevation: 1,278 m (4,193 ft)
- Settlements: Caprara

Ampollino Lake is a lake in the Province of Catanzaro, Province of Cosenza and Province of Crotone of Calabria, Italy. The reservoir was built in 1926. The artificial lake itself was established in 1923.
