= Isca sullo Ionio =

Isca sullo Ionio Iskia (Greek)
- Comune
- Comune di Isca sullo Ionio
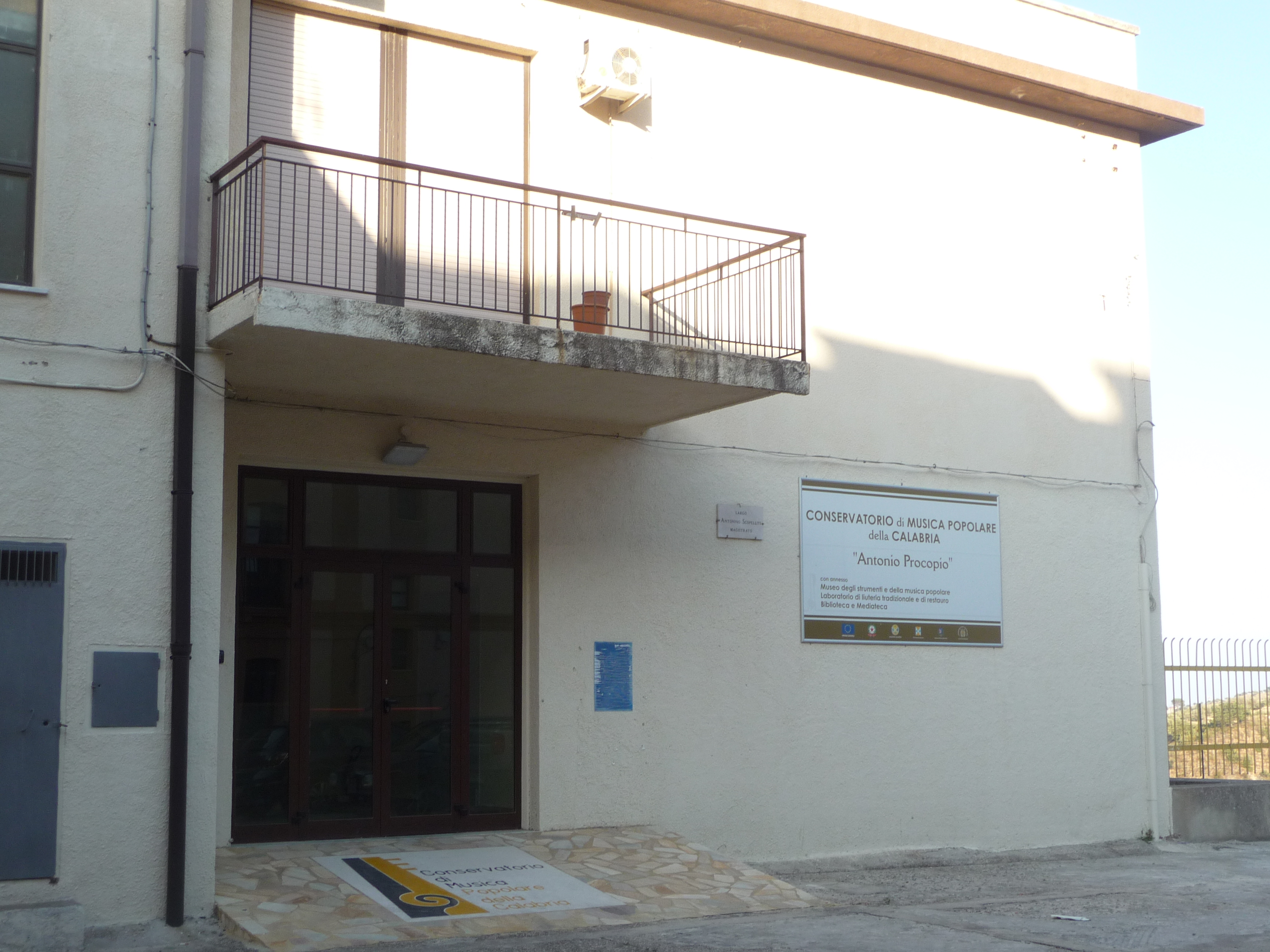
- Museum of popular music.

- Location within Italy Location within Calabria
- Coordinates: 38°36′N 16°31′E
- Country: Italy
- Region: Calabria
- Province: Catanzaro (CZ)

Government
  - Mayor: Vincenzo Mirarchi

Area
  - Total: 23.56 km^{2} (9.10 sq mi)
- Elevation: 188 m (617 ft)

Population (December 31, 2013)
  - Total: 1,639
  - Density: 69.57/km^{2} (180.2/sq mi)
- Demonym: Iscani
- Time zone: UTC+1 (CET)
  - Summer (DST): UTC+2 (CEST)
- Dialing code: 0967
- Patron saint: St. Martialis
- Saint day: July 10
- Website: Official website

Isca sullo Ionio (Calabrian: Jìsca; Greek: Iskia) is a comune and town in the province of Catanzaro in the Calabria region of Italy.

== History ==
Isca is of Greek origin and, according to the legend, the original name of the town was Sanagasi. The original town was located near the sea, probably about where Isca Marina is located today. Sometime, probably during the 9th century AD, the inhabitants moved to higher ground, where present day Isca is today, perched between two mountains. The high open view of the sea offered protection for the people, giving them time to prepare for a possible attack from sea invaders.

== Isca Marina ==
In the immediate days following the earthquake of 1947, talks began and planning of a new community or extension to Isca, that should be built on safer flat ground, near the beach. The name for the new community, would be called Isca Marina. Nine centuries earlier, the area now known as Isca Marina, was the original town location for the ancestors of Isca, until invasions of outsiders, forced the towns people, to higher ground. Now many hundreds of descendants of the original town location have come home. While some homes were built in the late 1940s in the marina, it was not until the early 1950s that roads, sidewalks, and the town square were built. In the years to follow, Isca Marina would become a vacation destination for Italian and foreign travelers, on summer holiday.

== Economy ==
With a warm summer climate, the area is a center of production of lemons, oranges, figs, chestnuts, grapes and beans.
