= Fossato Serralta =

- Comune
- Comune di Fossato Serralta
- Location within Italy Location within Calabria
- Coordinates: 38°59′45″N 16°34′45″E
- Country: Italy
- Region: Calabria
- Province: Catanzaro (CZ)
- Frazioni: Maranise

Area
  - Total: 12 km^{2} (4.6 sq mi)
- Elevation: 722 m (2,369 ft)

Population (31 December 2013)
  - Total: 599
  - Density: 50/km^{2} (130/sq mi)
- Time zone: UTC+1 (CET)
  - Summer (DST): UTC+2 (CEST)
- Postal code: 88050
- Dialing code: 0961
- Patron saint: San Francesco da Paola
- Saint day: First Sunday in August

Fossato Serralta (Calabrian: Hossàtu) is a village and comune in the province of Catanzaro, in the Calabria region of southern Italy.
