= Petrizzi =

- Comune
- Comune di Petrizzi
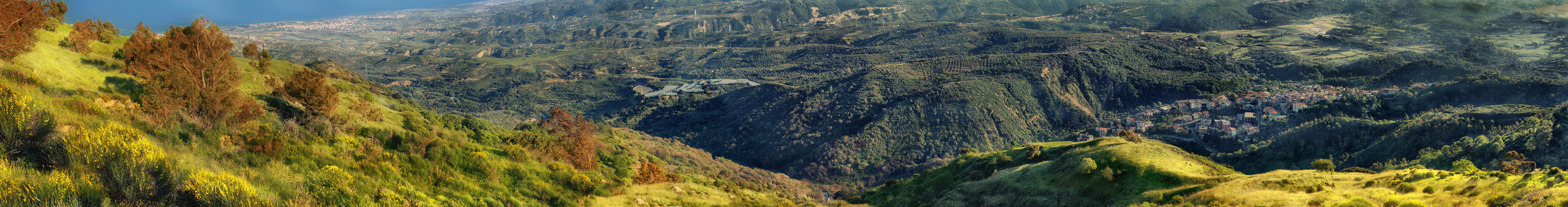

- Location within Italy Location within Calabria
- Coordinates: 38°42′N 16°28′E
- Country: Italy
- Region: Calabria
- Province: Catanzaro (CZ)
- Frazioni: Campo Farnia, La Pietà

Area
  - Total: 21 km^{2} (8.1 sq mi)
- Elevation: 391 m (1,283 ft)

Population (31 December 2013)
  - Total: 1,159
  - Density: 55/km^{2} (140/sq mi)
- Demonym: Petrizzesi
- Time zone: UTC+1 (CET)
  - Summer (DST): UTC+2 (CEST)
- Postal code: 88060
- Dialing code: 0967
- ISTAT code: 079094
- Patron saint: Sant'Antonio di Padova
- Saint day: 13 June
- Website: Official website

Petrizzi is a comune and town in the province of Catanzaro in the Calabria region of Italy. Petrizzi is located in the hills above Soverato. It overlooks the Ionian Sea

Documentary "Petrizzi - Il fiore di Pietra on YouTube"
