= Centrache =

- Comune
- Comune di Centrache
- Location within Italy Location within Calabria
- Coordinates: 38°44′N 16°26′E
- Country: Italy
- Region: Calabria
- Province: Catanzaro (CZ)

Area
  - Total: 7 km^{2} (2.7 sq mi)
- Elevation: 458 m (1,503 ft)

Population (31 December 2013)
  - Total: 422
  - Density: 60/km^{2} (160/sq mi)
- Time zone: UTC+1 (CET)
  - Summer (DST): UTC+2 (CEST)
- Postal code: 88060
- Dialing code: 0967

Centrache (Greek: Kentrikos) is a comune and town in the province of Catanzaro in the Calabria region of Italy.

== History ==
During the 1908 Messina earthquake, buildings and other structures throughout Centrache were destroyed; 80,000 people were killed.
