= Sersale =

- Comune
- Comune di Sersale
- Location within Italy Location within Calabria
- Coordinates: 39°1′N 16°44′E
- Country: Italy
- Region: Calabria
- Province: Province of Catanzaro (Cz)

Area
  - Total: 53 km^{2} (20 sq mi)
- Elevation: 740 m (2,430 ft)

Population (Dec. 2013)
  - Total: 4,701
  - Density: 89/km^{2} (230/sq mi)
- Demonym: Sersalesi
- Time zone: UTC+1 (CET)
  - Summer (DST): UTC+2 (CEST)
- Postal code: 88054
- Dialing code: 0961

Sersale is a comune in the province of Catanzaro in the Calabria region of Italy. As of 2013, Sersale had an estimated population of 4,701. Sersale was founded in 1620. It was named after a baron named Francesco Sersale who owned a large amount of land in the area surrounding the present borders of Sersale. Francesco Sersale and his family came from Naples. There are records of this family in that area from as far back as 1271.

Life was difficult for the "humble classes" of people in those times, and in Serrastretta, things were so bad that a small group opted to leave. Upon hearing that Francesco seemed to be a very just landowner and offered what seemed to be a good deal to the peasants who settled there, a small group of colonists walked about 48 to 80 kilometres (30 to 50 mi) over rough terrain to start new lives on Francesco's property. After having a fine palace built for himself, he had his workmen build narrow little shacks for the workers to occupy, in full view of his palace. He developed a co-operative system where people could work patches of land, and have to pay him a fee at the end of the year. He encouraged them to plant trees and gardens to feed their families, as the land was good and there was a stream that ran through the area all year round.

The original settlers were all from Serrastretta:

- Francesco Giuliano,
- Pietro Torchia,
- Giovanni Girolamo Talarico,
- Giovanni Tommaso Mancusi,
- Marco De Fazio
- Vittorio Torchia,
- Luca Antonio Felice,
- Francesco Mulinaro,
- Giovanni Maria Senatore,
- Giovanni Tommaso Gallo,
- Pietro Giovanni Mazza and
- Marcantonio Defazio, alias Caulo.

Many descendants of these original settlers still live in Sersale, and of course, many have emigrated to various parts of the world.

After Francesco Sersale died, his land passed into the hands of his descendants who did not share his values. Their greed and disdain for human life caused misery for the settlers. At certain periods, because the children of the owners did not have to work, they caused many problems such as taking advantage of the young girls and getting them pregnant, as well as increasing the fees for land usage incommensurate with the produce of the land. The great-grandchildren of this Baron also lost pieces of land by making bad investments; and this is how eventually the land was owned by many people and the town developed.

Translated from Sersale - Storia di una comunità presilana by Michele Scarpino - Translator, Antonio Torchia.
