= Davoli =

- Comune
- Comune di Davoli
- Location within Italy Location within Calabria
- Coordinates: 38°39′00″N 16°29′10″E
- Country: Italy
- Region: Calabria
- Province: Catanzaro (CZ)

Area
  - Total: 25.7 km^{2} (9.9 sq mi)
- Elevation: 400 m (1,300 ft)

Population (31 December 2013)
  - Total: 5,579
  - Density: 217/km^{2} (562/sq mi)
- Demonym: Davolesi
- Time zone: UTC+1 (CET)
  - Summer (DST): UTC+2 (CEST)
- Postal code: 88060
- Dialing code: 0967
- Patron saint: San Vittore
- Saint day: 21 July
- Website: Official website

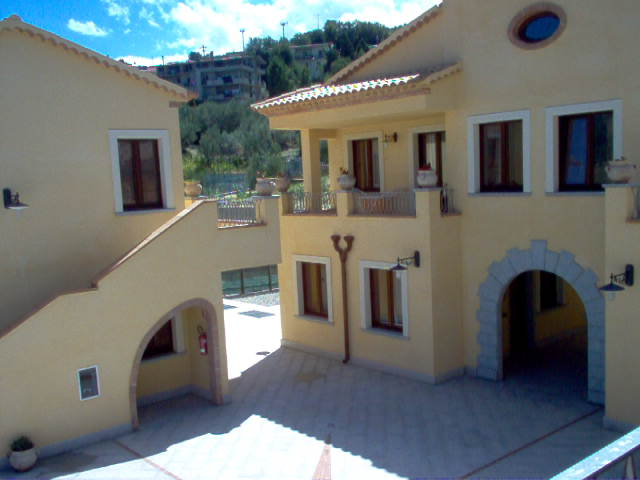
Davoli Village

Davoli (Calabrian: Dàvuli or Dàvule; Greek: Diavoloi) is a town and comune in the province of Catanzaro, in the Calabria region of southern Italy.
