= Palermiti =

Palermiti Panormìtes (Greek)
- Comune
- Comune di Palermiti
- Location within Italy Location within Calabria
- Coordinates: 38°45′N 16°27′E
- Country: Italy
- Region: Calabria
- Province: Catanzaro (CZ)

Area
  - Total: 18 km^{2} (6.9 sq mi)
- Elevation: 496 m (1,627 ft)

Population (2013)
  - Total: 1,237
  - Density: 69/km^{2} (180/sq mi)
- Demonym: Palermitesi
- Time zone: UTC+1 (CET)
  - Summer (DST): UTC+2 (CEST)
- Postal code: 88050
- Dialing code: 0961
- Patron saint: Maria S.S. della Luce
- Saint day: 7 April
- Website: Official website

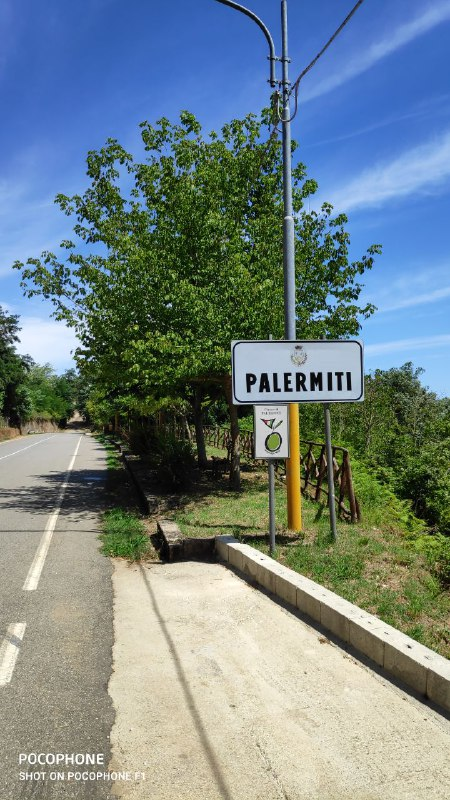
Road sign marking the entrance to the town

Palermiti (Greek: Panormites) is a village and comune of the province of Catanzaro in the Calabria region of southern Italy.
