= San Vito sullo Ionio =

- Comune
- Comune di San Vito sullo Ionio
- Location within Italy Location within Calabria
- Coordinates: 38°43′N 16°25′E
- Country: Italy
- Region: Calabria
- Province: Catanzaro (CZ)
- Frazioni: Aria Melia, Cerrifita, Fegotto, Foresta, Iannuzzo, Minà, Paccusa, Pietrascritta, Postaglianadi

Area
  - Total: 17 km^{2} (6.6 sq mi)
- Elevation: 404 m (1,325 ft)

Population (28 December 2020)
  - Total: 1,689
  - Density: 99/km^{2} (260/sq mi)
- Demonym: Sanvitesi
- Time zone: UTC+1 (CET)
  - Summer (DST): UTC+2 (CEST)
- Postal code: 88067
- Dialing code: 0967
- ISTAT code: 079122
- Patron saint: San Vito martire
- Saint day: 15 June
- Website: Official website

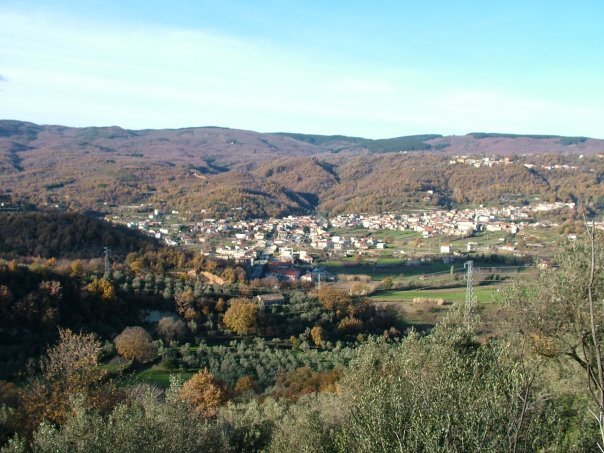
Panorama of San Vito sullo Jonio.

San Vito sullo lonio is a comune and town in the province of Catanzaro located in the valley in Calabria region of Italy. The patron saint of San Vito is St. Vitus. Legend has it that St. Vitus himself protected the town from a flood. The town's economy relies heavily on agriculture and tourism.
