= Gasperina =

- Comune
- Comune di Gasperina
- Coat of arms

- Location within Italy Location within Calabria
- Coordinates: 38°44′26″N 16°30′20″E
- Country: Italy
- Region: Calabria
- Province: Catanzaro (CZ)
- Frazioni: Pilinga, Melitì

Government
  - Mayor: Domenico Carlo Lomanni

Area
  - Total: 6 km^{2} (2.3 sq mi)
- Elevation: 550 m (1,800 ft)

Population (31 December 2013)
  - Total: 2,140
  - Density: 360/km^{2} (920/sq mi)
- Demonym: Gasperinesi
- Time zone: UTC+1 (CET)
  - Summer (DST): UTC+2 (CEST)
- Postal code: 88060
- Dialing code: 0967
- Website: Official website

Gasperina is a town and comune in the province of Catanzaro, in the Calabria region of southern Italy.

Gasperina is also the birthplace of internationally collected figurative artist Antonio Diego Voci, 1920–1985.
