= Taverna, Calabria =

Taverna
- Comune
- Comune di Taverna
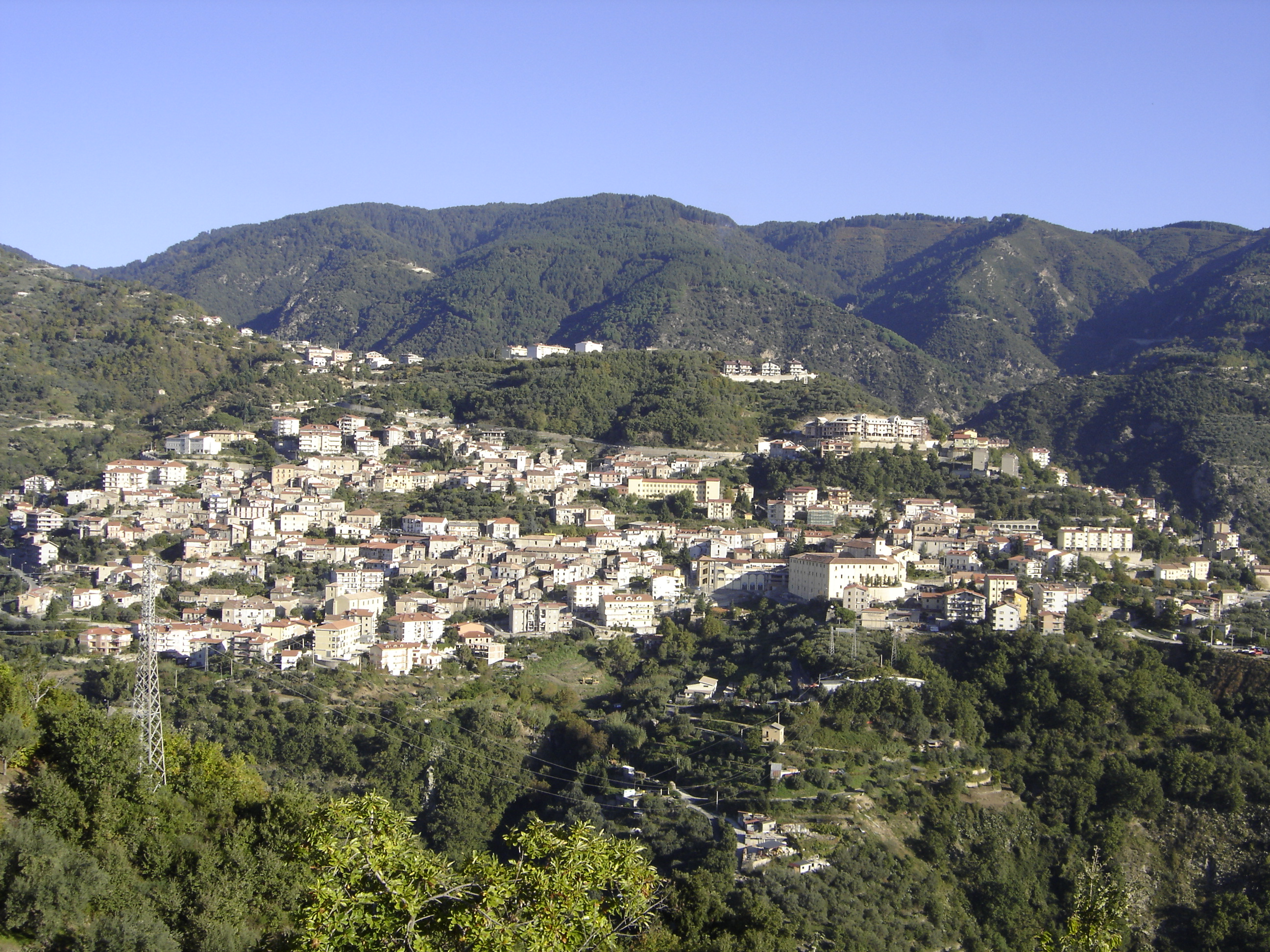

- Location within Italy Location within Calabria
- Coordinates: 39°01′15″N 16°34′50″E
- Country: Italy
- Region: Calabria
- Province: Catanzaro (CZ)
- Frazioni: Villaggio Mancuso, Villaggio Racise, Monaco

Government
  - Mayor: Sebastiano Tarantino

Area
  - Total: 132.31 km^{2} (51.09 sq mi)
- Elevation: 521 m (1,709 ft)

Population (2013)
  - Total: 2,729
  - Density: 20.63/km^{2} (53.42/sq mi)
- Time zone: UTC+1 (CET)
  - Summer (DST): UTC+2 (CEST)
- Postal code: 88055
- Dialing code: 0961
- Website: Official website

Taverna is a comune and town in the province of Catanzaro in the Calabria region of Italy. It is located at the feet of the Sila mountain range.

== People ==
- Mattia Preti, 17th-century Baroque painter
- Gregorio Preti, 17th-century Baroque painter, brother of Mattia Preti
