= Cortale =

- Comune
- Comune di Cortale
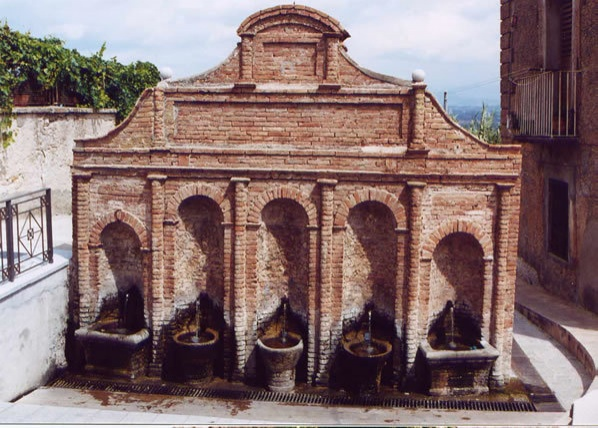

- Coat of arms

- Location within Italy Location within Calabria
- Coordinates: 38°50′N 16°25′E
- Country: Italy
- Region: Calabria
- Province: Catanzaro (CZ)
- Frazioni: Tre aree, Giardino, Piano.

Area
  - Total: 29 km^{2} (11 sq mi)
- Elevation: 410 m (1,350 ft)

Population (31 December 2013)
  - Total: 2,179
  - Density: 75/km^{2} (190/sq mi)
- Demonym: Cortalesi
- Time zone: UTC+1 (CET)
  - Summer (DST): UTC+2 (CEST)
- Postal code: 88020
- Dialing code: 0968
- Patron saint: John the Baptist
- Saint day: 24 June
- Website: Official website

Cortale (Calabrian: Curtàli; Greek: Kortalos) is a comune and town in the province of Catanzaro in the Calabria region of Italy.

== Twin towns — sister cities ==
Cortale is twinned with:

- Erba, Lombardy, Italy
- Ponte Lambro, Italy
