= Soveria Simeri =

- Comune
- Comune di Soveria Simeri
- Location within Italy Location within Calabria
- Coordinates: 38°57′N 16°41′E
- Country: Italy
- Region: Calabria
- Province: Catanzaro (CZ)

Government
  - Mayor: Amedeo Mormile

Area
  - Total: 22.28 km^{2} (8.60 sq mi)
- Elevation: 378 m (1,240 ft)

Population (31 October 2018)
  - Total: 1,534
  - Density: 68.85/km^{2} (178.3/sq mi)
- Demonym: Soveritani
- Time zone: UTC+1 (CET)
  - Summer (DST): UTC+2 (CEST)
- Postal code: 88050
- Dialing code: 0961
- Patron saint: St. Donatus of Arezzo
- Saint day: 7 August
- Website: Official website

Soveria Simeri is a comune and town in the province of Catanzaro in the Calabria region of southern Italy. The village is 16 kilometres (10 mi) from Catanzaro, 12 kilometres (7 mi) from the Ionian Sea coast and 20 kilometres (12 mi) from La Sila plateau.

The economy is predominantly agricultural with a good development of the primary sector. Well-known are the productions of citrus fruits, olive oil, honey, meats, dairy products, and organic products. Craftsmanship activities include three laboratories of glassworks.
