= List of municipalities of Calabria =

Location of Calabria within Italy

Provinces of Calabria

The following is a list of municipalities (comuni) in the region of Calabria in Italy.

There are 404 municipalities in Calabria as of 2026:

- 80 in the Province of Catanzaro
- 150 in the Province of Cosenza
- 27 in the Province of Crotone
- 97 in the Metropolitan City of Reggio Calabria
- 50 in the Province of Vibo Valentia

== List ==
Municipality	Province	Population (2026)	Area (km²)	Density
Acquaformosa	Cosenza	930	22.71	41.0
Acquappesa	Cosenza	1,754	14.45	121.4
Acquaro	Vibo Valentia	1,780	25.25	70.5
Acri	Cosenza	18,059	200.63	90.0
Africo	Reggio Calabria	2,670	53.90	49.5
Agnana Calabra	Reggio Calabria	446	8.49	52.5
Aiello Calabro	Cosenza	1,324	38.51	34.4
Aieta	Cosenza	703	48.30	14.6
Albi	Catanzaro	739	29.64	24.9
Albidona	Cosenza	1,047	64.67	16.2
Alessandria del Carretto	Cosenza	337	41.12	8.2
Altilia	Cosenza	669	10.56	63.4
Altomonte	Cosenza	3,943	65.72	60.0
Amantea	Cosenza	13,859	29.46	470.4
Amaroni	Catanzaro	1,595	9.88	161.4
Amato	Catanzaro	769	20.93	36.7
Amendolara	Cosenza	2,590	60.91	42.5
Andali	Catanzaro	581	17.87	32.5
Anoia	Reggio Calabria	1,995	10.17	196.2
Antonimina	Reggio Calabria	1,152	22.91	50.3
Aprigliano	Cosenza	2,307	122.43	18.8
Ardore	Reggio Calabria	4,906	32.78	149.7
Arena	Vibo Valentia	1,144	34.32	33.3
Argusto	Catanzaro	400	6.88	58.1
Badolato	Catanzaro	2,829	37.07	76.3
Bagaladi	Reggio Calabria	916	30.02	30.5
Bagnara Calabra	Reggio Calabria	9,102	24.85	366.3
Belcastro	Catanzaro	1,211	53.56	22.6
Belmonte Calabro	Cosenza	1,664	23.98	69.4
Belsito	Cosenza	892	11.55	77.2
Belvedere di Spinello	Crotone	1,878	30.31	62.0
Belvedere Marittimo	Cosenza	8,927	37.09	240.7
Benestare	Reggio Calabria	2,489	18.72	133.0
Bianchi	Cosenza	1,141	33.32	34.2
Bianco	Reggio Calabria	4,298	29.99	143.3
Bisignano	Cosenza	9,428	86.20	109.4
Bivongi	Reggio Calabria	1,131	25.35	44.6
Bocchigliero	Cosenza	1,038	98.82	10.5
Bonifati	Cosenza	2,504	33.85	74.0
Borgia	Catanzaro	7,185	42.38	169.5
Botricello	Catanzaro	5,022	15.48	324.4
Bova	Reggio Calabria	460	46.94	9.8
Bova Marina	Reggio Calabria	3,925	29.50	133.1
Bovalino	Reggio Calabria	8,743	18.06	484.1
Brancaleone	Reggio Calabria	3,124	36.14	86.4
Briatico	Vibo Valentia	3,578	27.92	128.2
Brognaturo	Vibo Valentia	719	25.69	28.0
Bruzzano Zeffirio	Reggio Calabria	1,010	20.74	48.7
Buonvicino	Cosenza	1,971	30.60	64.4
Caccuri	Crotone	1,497	61.38	24.4
Calanna	Reggio Calabria	735	10.97	67.0
Calopezzati	Cosenza	1,224	22.57	54.2
Caloveto	Cosenza	1,046	24.96	41.9
Camini	Reggio Calabria	793	17.41	45.5
Campana	Cosenza	1,337	104.65	12.8
Campo Calabro	Reggio Calabria	4,512	8.01	563.3
Candidoni	Reggio Calabria	407	26.95	15.1
Canna	Cosenza	577	20.37	28.3
Canolo	Reggio Calabria	684	28.30	24.2
Capistrano	Vibo Valentia	931	21.12	44.1
Caraffa del Bianco	Reggio Calabria	429	11.46	37.4
Caraffa di Catanzaro	Catanzaro	1,682	25.05	67.1
Cardeto	Reggio Calabria	1,237	37.27	33.2
Cardinale	Catanzaro	1,713	30.12	56.9
Careri	Reggio Calabria	2,049	38.16	53.7
Carfizzi	Crotone	534	20.73	25.8
Cariati	Cosenza	7,582	28.82	263.1
Carlopoli	Catanzaro	1,303	16.41	79.4
Carolei	Cosenza	3,027	15.43	196.2
Carpanzano	Cosenza	185	14.27	13.0
Casabona	Crotone	2,163	67.67	32.0
Casali del Manco	Cosenza	9,269	168.95	54.9
Casignana	Reggio Calabria	680	24.54	27.7
Cassano all'Ionio	Cosenza	16,337	159.07	102.7
Castelsilano	Crotone	902	40.06	22.5
Castiglione Cosentino	Cosenza	2,731	14.09	193.8
Castrolibero	Cosenza	9,074	11.56	784.9
Castroregio	Cosenza	208	42.06	4.9
Castrovillari	Cosenza	20,431	130.64	156.4
Catanzaro	Catanzaro	82,708	112.72	733.7
Caulonia	Reggio Calabria	6,649	101.76	65.3
Celico	Cosenza	2,421	99.75	24.3
Cellara	Cosenza	473	5.86	80.7
Cenadi	Catanzaro	502	11.92	42.1
Centrache	Catanzaro	353	7.96	44.3
Cerchiara di Calabria	Cosenza	2,074	81.97	25.3
Cerenzia	Crotone	983	21.97	44.7
Cerisano	Cosenza	2,909	15.32	189.9
Cerva	Catanzaro	1,011	21.37	47.3
Cervicati	Cosenza	767	12.09	63.4
Cerzeto	Cosenza	1,208	21.90	55.2
Cessaniti	Vibo Valentia	2,844	17.97	158.3
Cetraro	Cosenza	9,159	66.14	138.5
Chiaravalle Centrale	Catanzaro	5,072	23.83	212.8
Cicala	Catanzaro	832	9.28	89.7
Ciminà	Reggio Calabria	510	49.24	10.4
Cinquefrondi	Reggio Calabria	6,235	29.95	208.2
Cirò	Crotone	2,321	71.05	32.7
Cirò Marina	Crotone	14,233	41.68	341.5
Cittanova	Reggio Calabria	9,580	61.98	154.6
Civita	Cosenza	773	27.62	28.0
Cleto	Cosenza	1,270	18.98	66.9
Colosimi	Cosenza	1,077	25.58	42.1
Condofuri	Reggio Calabria	4,491	60.30	74.5
Conflenti	Catanzaro	1,317	29.34	44.9
Corigliano-Rossano	Cosenza	74,403	346.56	214.7
Cortale	Catanzaro	1,802	30.01	60.0
Cosenza	Cosenza	63,449	37.86	1,675.9
Cosoleto	Reggio Calabria	728	34.37	21.2
Cotronei	Crotone	5,068	79.20	64.0
Cropalati	Cosenza	947	33.70	28.1
Cropani	Catanzaro	4,912	44.81	109.6
Crosia	Cosenza	9,616	21.10	455.7
Crotone	Crotone	58,136	182.00	319.4
Crucoli	Crotone	2,752	50.43	54.6
Curinga	Catanzaro	6,358	52.53	121.0
Cutro	Crotone	9,165	133.69	68.6
Dasà	Vibo Valentia	1,067	6.46	165.2
Davoli	Catanzaro	5,679	25.03	226.9
Decollatura	Catanzaro	2,817	50.83	55.4
Delianuova	Reggio Calabria	3,052	21.38	142.8
Diamante	Cosenza	4,947	12.21	405.2
Dinami	Vibo Valentia	1,642	44.45	36.9
Dipignano	Cosenza	4,054	23.37	173.5
Domanico	Cosenza	915	23.66	38.7
Drapia	Vibo Valentia	2,095	21.59	97.0
Fabrizia	Vibo Valentia	1,928	40.00	48.2
Fagnano Castello	Cosenza	3,257	29.67	109.8
Falconara Albanese	Cosenza	1,507	19.27	78.2
Falerna	Catanzaro	4,013	24.04	166.9
Feroleto Antico	Catanzaro	1,931	22.38	86.3
Feroleto della Chiesa	Reggio Calabria	1,489	7.56	197.0
Ferruzzano	Reggio Calabria	685	19.11	35.8
Figline Vegliaturo	Cosenza	1,088	4.16	261.5
Filadelfia	Vibo Valentia	4,942	31.50	156.9
Filandari	Vibo Valentia	1,737	18.84	92.2
Filogaso	Vibo Valentia	1,306	23.90	54.6
Firmo	Cosenza	1,758	11.70	150.3
Fiumara	Reggio Calabria	789	6.59	119.7
Fiumefreddo Bruzio	Cosenza	3,979	32.06	124.1
Fossato Serralta	Catanzaro	527	11.85	44.5
Francavilla Angitola	Vibo Valentia	1,798	28.63	62.8
Francavilla Marittima	Cosenza	2,708	33.02	82.0
Francica	Vibo Valentia	1,608	22.70	70.8
Frascineto	Cosenza	1,812	29.11	62.2
Fuscaldo	Cosenza	7,923	60.80	130.3
Gagliato	Catanzaro	411	7.04	58.4
Galatro	Reggio Calabria	1,391	51.34	27.1
Gasperina	Catanzaro	1,860	6.78	274.3
Gerace	Reggio Calabria	2,275	28.99	78.5
Gerocarne	Vibo Valentia	1,856	45.23	41.0
Giffone	Reggio Calabria	1,553	14.72	105.5
Gimigliano	Catanzaro	2,895	33.55	86.3
Gioia Tauro	Reggio Calabria	19,324	39.87	484.7
Gioiosa Ionica	Reggio Calabria	6,834	36.07	189.5
Girifalco	Catanzaro	5,401	43.08	125.4
Gizzeria	Catanzaro	5,389	37.19	144.9
Grimaldi	Cosenza	1,489	24.71	60.3
Grisolia	Cosenza	2,161	51.75	41.8
Grotteria	Reggio Calabria	2,815	37.98	74.1
Guardavalle	Catanzaro	4,004	60.27	66.4
Guardia Piemontese	Cosenza	1,767	21.46	82.3
Ionadi	Vibo Valentia	4,768	8.81	541.2
Isca sullo Ionio	Catanzaro	1,480	23.56	62.8
Isola di Capo Rizzuto	Crotone	18,985	126.65	149.9
Jacurso	Catanzaro	512	21.20	24.2
Joppolo	Vibo Valentia	1,711	21.67	79.0
Laganadi	Reggio Calabria	321	8.19	39.2
Lago	Cosenza	2,362	49.96	47.3
Laino Borgo	Cosenza	1,578	57.08	27.6
Laino Castello	Cosenza	749	37.33	20.1
Lamezia Terme	Catanzaro	67,005	162.43	412.5
Lappano	Cosenza	849	12.21	69.5
Lattarico	Cosenza	3,671	43.93	83.6
Laureana di Borrello	Reggio Calabria	4,557	35.69	127.7
Limbadi	Vibo Valentia	3,184	29.15	109.2
Locri	Reggio Calabria	11,856	25.75	460.4
Longobardi	Cosenza	3,218	18.24	176.4
Longobucco	Cosenza	2,435	212.26	11.5
Lungro	Cosenza	2,046	35.65	57.4
Luzzi	Cosenza	8,680	77.60	111.9
Magisano	Catanzaro	1,042	31.94	32.6
Maida	Catanzaro	4,465	58.34	76.5
Maierà	Cosenza	1,107	17.78	62.3
Maierato	Vibo Valentia	2,152	39.93	53.9
Malito	Cosenza	681	16.92	40.2
Malvito	Cosenza	1,567	38.24	41.0
Mammola	Reggio Calabria	2,335	81.07	28.8
Mandatoriccio	Cosenza	2,392	37.32	64.1
Mangone	Cosenza	1,895	12.27	154.4
Marano Marchesato	Cosenza	3,329	5.04	660.5
Marano Principato	Cosenza	2,995	6.32	473.9
Marcedusa	Catanzaro	354	15.68	22.6
Marcellinara	Catanzaro	2,148	20.91	102.7
Marina di Gioiosa Ionica	Reggio Calabria	6,303	16.16	390.0
Maropati	Reggio Calabria	1,291	10.52	122.7
Martirano	Catanzaro	784	14.90	52.6
Martirano Lombardo	Catanzaro	923	19.84	46.5
Martone	Reggio Calabria	476	8.34	57.1
Marzi	Cosenza	939	15.81	59.4
Melicuccà	Reggio Calabria	780	17.40	44.8
Melicucco	Reggio Calabria	4,842	6.53	741.5
Melissa	Crotone	3,297	51.63	63.9
Melito di Porto Salvo	Reggio Calabria	10,314	35.41	291.3
Mendicino	Cosenza	8,892	35.69	249.1
Mesoraca	Crotone	5,701	94.79	60.1
Miglierina	Catanzaro	671	13.94	48.1
Mileto	Vibo Valentia	6,228	35.65	174.7
Molochio	Reggio Calabria	2,122	37.45	56.7
Monasterace	Reggio Calabria	3,234	15.73	205.6
Mongiana	Vibo Valentia	573	18.41	31.1
Mongrassano	Cosenza	1,446	35.16	41.1
Montalto Uffugo	Cosenza	19,909	76.67	259.7
Montauro	Catanzaro	1,930	11.74	164.4
Montebello Ionico	Reggio Calabria	5,451	56.45	96.6
Montegiordano	Cosenza	1,498	35.88	41.8
Montepaone	Catanzaro	5,890	16.85	349.6
Monterosso Calabro	Vibo Valentia	1,440	18.37	78.4
Morano Calabro	Cosenza	3,748	116.26	32.2
Mormanno	Cosenza	2,475	78.88	31.4
Motta San Giovanni	Reggio Calabria	5,377	46.48	115.7
Motta Santa Lucia	Catanzaro	818	26.30	31.1
Mottafollone	Cosenza	1,013	31.58	32.1
Nardodipace	Vibo Valentia	1,018	33.30	30.6
Nicotera	Vibo Valentia	7,079	28.25	250.6
Nocara	Cosenza	284	34.05	8.3
Nocera Terinese	Catanzaro	4,773	46.58	102.5
Olivadi	Catanzaro	481	7.17	67.1
Oppido Mamertina	Reggio Calabria	4,674	58.88	79.4
Oriolo	Cosenza	1,762	85.60	20.6
Orsomarso	Cosenza	1,056	90.41	11.7
Palermiti	Catanzaro	1,036	18.38	56.4
Palizzi	Reggio Calabria	1,826	52.62	34.7
Pallagorio	Crotone	882	44.48	19.8
Palmi	Reggio Calabria	17,983	32.12	559.9
Paludi	Cosenza	936	41.74	22.4
Panettieri	Cosenza	304	14.67	20.7
Paola	Cosenza	15,090	42.88	351.9
Papasidero	Cosenza	572	55.22	10.4
Parenti	Cosenza	1,925	37.62	51.2
Parghelia	Vibo Valentia	1,271	7.95	159.9
Paterno Calabro	Cosenza	1,319	24.20	54.5
Pazzano	Reggio Calabria	497	15.57	31.9
Pedivigliano	Cosenza	729	16.65	43.8
Pentone	Catanzaro	1,791	12.38	144.7
Petilia Policastro	Crotone	8,430	98.35	85.7
Petrizzi	Catanzaro	988	21.90	45.1
Petronà	Catanzaro	2,313	45.79	50.5
Piane Crati	Cosenza	1,278	2.33	548.5
Pianopoli	Catanzaro	2,572	24.65	104.3
Pietrafitta	Cosenza	1,118	9.24	121.0
Pietrapaola	Cosenza	998	52.82	18.9
Pizzo	Vibo Valentia	8,668	22.89	378.7
Pizzoni	Vibo Valentia	916	21.70	42.2
Placanica	Reggio Calabria	977	29.51	33.1
Plataci	Cosenza	626	49.41	12.7
Platania	Catanzaro	1,965	26.84	73.2
Platì	Reggio Calabria	3,646	50.87	71.7
Polia	Vibo Valentia	770	31.51	24.4
Polistena	Reggio Calabria	9,822	11.77	834.5
Portigliola	Reggio Calabria	994	6.00	165.7
Praia a Mare	Cosenza	6,268	23.59	265.7
Reggio di Calabria	Reggio Calabria	167,925	239.04	702.5
Rende	Cosenza	36,893	55.28	667.4
Riace	Reggio Calabria	1,796	16.24	110.6
Ricadi	Vibo Valentia	5,048	22.54	224.0
Rizziconi	Reggio Calabria	7,603	40.22	189.0
Rocca di Neto	Crotone	5,286	44.93	117.6
Rocca Imperiale	Cosenza	3,116	55.03	56.6
Roccabernarda	Crotone	3,045	64.89	46.9
Roccaforte del Greco	Reggio Calabria	291	43.86	6.6
Roccella Ionica	Reggio Calabria	6,119	37.82	161.8
Roggiano Gravina	Cosenza	6,708	44.88	149.5
Roghudi	Reggio Calabria	897	46.92	19.1
Rogliano	Cosenza	5,150	41.68	123.6
Rombiolo	Vibo Valentia	4,201	22.84	183.9
Rosarno	Reggio Calabria	14,528	39.56	367.2
Rose	Cosenza	4,109	47.49	86.5
Roseto Capo Spulico	Cosenza	1,865	30.66	60.8
Rota Greca	Cosenza	891	13.12	67.9
Rovito	Cosenza	2,901	10.68	271.6
Samo	Reggio Calabria	679	50.22	13.5
San Basile	Cosenza	882	18.67	47.2
San Benedetto Ullano	Cosenza	1,373	19.57	70.2
San Calogero	Vibo Valentia	3,712	25.34	146.5
San Cosmo Albanese	Cosenza	540	11.57	46.7
San Costantino Calabro	Vibo Valentia	2,031	6.79	299.1
San Demetrio Corone	Cosenza	2,955	61.87	47.8
San Donato di Ninea	Cosenza	1,030	82.40	12.5
San Ferdinando	Reggio Calabria	4,469	14.20	314.7
San Fili	Cosenza	2,406	20.96	114.8
San Floro	Catanzaro	691	18.32	37.7
San Giorgio Albanese	Cosenza	1,256	22.68	55.4
San Giorgio Morgeto	Reggio Calabria	2,945	35.40	83.2
San Giovanni di Gerace	Reggio Calabria	394	13.57	29.0
San Giovanni in Fiore	Cosenza	15,328	282.53	54.3
San Gregorio d'Ippona	Vibo Valentia	2,574	12.53	205.4
San Lorenzo	Reggio Calabria	2,068	64.52	32.1
San Lorenzo Bellizzi	Cosenza	501	40.63	12.3
San Lorenzo del Vallo	Cosenza	3,057	22.93	133.3
San Luca	Reggio Calabria	3,297	105.35	31.3
San Lucido	Cosenza	7,775	27.12	286.7
San Mango d'Aquino	Catanzaro	1,384	6.89	200.9
San Marco Argentano	Cosenza	6,769	80.50	84.1
San Martino di Finita	Cosenza	917	23.90	38.4
San Mauro Marchesato	Crotone	1,868	41.91	44.6
San Nicola Arcella	Cosenza	2,018	11.69	172.6
San Nicola da Crissa	Vibo Valentia	1,174	19.40	60.5
San Nicola dell'Alto	Crotone	645	7.85	82.2
San Pietro a Maida	Catanzaro	3,810	16.45	231.6
San Pietro Apostolo	Catanzaro	1,533	11.72	130.8
San Pietro di Caridà	Reggio Calabria	923	48.08	19.2
San Pietro in Amantea	Cosenza	446	9.84	45.3
San Pietro in Guarano	Cosenza	3,298	48.35	68.2
San Procopio	Reggio Calabria	469	11.36	41.3
San Roberto	Reggio Calabria	1,479	34.64	42.7
San Sostene	Catanzaro	1,407	32.49	43.3
San Sosti	Cosenza	1,839	43.55	42.2
San Vincenzo La Costa	Cosenza	1,930	18.42	104.8
San Vito sullo Ionio	Catanzaro	1,536	17.17	89.5
Sangineto	Cosenza	1,202	27.51	43.7
Sant'Agata del Bianco	Reggio Calabria	524	20.20	25.9
Sant'Agata di Esaro	Cosenza	1,703	47.63	35.8
Sant'Alessio in Aspromonte	Reggio Calabria	299	3.99	74.9
Sant'Andrea Apostolo dello Ionio	Catanzaro	1,691	21.43	78.9
Sant'Eufemia d'Aspromonte	Reggio Calabria	3,625	32.88	110.2
Sant'Ilario dello Ionio	Reggio Calabria	1,308	14.00	93.4
Sant'Onofrio	Vibo Valentia	2,655	18.66	142.3
Santa Caterina Albanese	Cosenza	1,052	17.34	60.7
Santa Caterina dello Ionio	Catanzaro	1,918	40.69	47.1
Santa Cristina d'Aspromonte	Reggio Calabria	707	23.41	30.2
Santa Domenica Talao	Cosenza	1,127	36.12	31.2
Santa Maria del Cedro	Cosenza	5,179	18.42	281.2
Santa Severina	Crotone	1,829	52.31	35.0
Santa Sofia d'Epiro	Cosenza	2,081	39.22	53.1
Santo Stefano di Rogliano	Cosenza	1,736	19.56	88.8
Santo Stefano in Aspromonte	Reggio Calabria	1,001	17.80	56.2
Saracena	Cosenza	3,234	109.15	29.6
Satriano	Catanzaro	3,371	21.16	159.3
Savelli	Crotone	1,005	48.92	20.5
Scala Coeli	Cosenza	734	67.50	10.9
Scalea	Cosenza	11,792	22.56	522.7
Scandale	Crotone	2,856	54.26	52.6
Scido	Reggio Calabria	797	17.53	45.5
Scigliano	Cosenza	1,095	17.46	62.7
Scilla	Reggio Calabria	4,405	44.13	99.8
Sellia	Catanzaro	452	12.81	35.3
Sellia Marina	Catanzaro	7,798	41.46	188.1
Seminara	Reggio Calabria	2,473	33.85	73.1
Serra d'Aiello	Cosenza	521	4.51	115.5
Serra San Bruno	Vibo Valentia	6,252	40.57	154.1
Serrastretta	Catanzaro	2,878	41.65	69.1
Serrata	Reggio Calabria	788	22.06	35.7
Sersale	Catanzaro	4,087	53.30	76.7
Settingiano	Catanzaro	3,292	14.35	229.4
Siderno	Reggio Calabria	17,619	31.86	553.0
Simbario	Vibo Valentia	910	20.83	43.7
Simeri Crichi	Catanzaro	4,689	46.74	100.3
Sinopoli	Reggio Calabria	1,798	25.22	71.3
Sorbo San Basile	Catanzaro	708	59.28	11.9
Sorianello	Vibo Valentia	1,068	9.59	111.4
Soriano Calabro	Vibo Valentia	2,783	15.44	180.2
Soverato	Catanzaro	8,409	7.79	1,079.5
Soveria Mannelli	Catanzaro	2,733	20.50	133.3
Soveria Simeri	Catanzaro	1,413	22.28	63.4
Spadola	Vibo Valentia	795	9.65	82.4
Spezzano Albanese	Cosenza	6,388	32.26	198.0
Spezzano della Sila	Cosenza	4,304	80.29	53.6
Spilinga	Vibo Valentia	1,345	17.42	77.2
Squillace	Catanzaro	3,600	34.33	104.9
Staiti	Reggio Calabria	161	16.31	9.9
Stalettì	Catanzaro	2,394	12.11	197.7
Stefanaconi	Vibo Valentia	2,248	23.18	97.0
Stignano	Reggio Calabria	1,143	17.77	64.3
Stilo	Reggio Calabria	2,306	78.11	29.5
Strongoli	Crotone	6,113	85.56	71.4
Tarsia	Cosenza	1,818	48.28	37.7
Taurianova	Reggio Calabria	14,643	48.55	301.6
Taverna	Catanzaro	2,465	132.31	18.6
Terranova da Sibari	Cosenza	4,441	43.46	102.2
Terranova Sappo Minulio	Reggio Calabria	402	9.12	44.1
Terravecchia	Cosenza	553	20.12	27.5
Tiriolo	Catanzaro	3,461	29.26	118.3
Torano Castello	Cosenza	4,255	30.22	140.8
Torre di Ruggiero	Catanzaro	933	25.37	36.8
Tortora	Cosenza	5,919	58.22	101.7
Trebisacce	Cosenza	8,582	26.72	321.2
Tropea	Vibo Valentia	5,668	3.66	1,548.6
Umbriatico	Crotone	685	73.36	9.3
Vaccarizzo Albanese	Cosenza	1,010	8.53	118.4
Vallefiorita	Catanzaro	1,430	13.88	103.0
Vallelonga	Vibo Valentia	828	17.64	46.9
Varapodio	Reggio Calabria	2,062	29.12	70.8
Vazzano	Vibo Valentia	919	20.20	45.5
Verbicaro	Cosenza	2,489	32.64	76.3
Verzino	Crotone	1,506	45.63	33.0
Vibo Valentia	Vibo Valentia	30,753	46.57	660.4
Villa San Giovanni	Reggio Calabria	12,676	12.17	1,041.6
Villapiana	Cosenza	5,612	39.73	141.3
Zaccanopoli	Vibo Valentia	646	5.38	120.1
Zagarise	Catanzaro	1,313	49.33	26.6
Zambrone	Vibo Valentia	1,766	15.77	112.0
Zumpano	Cosenza	2,589	8.08	320.4
Zungri	Vibo Valentia	1,793	23.46	76.4
