= List of municipalities of the Province of Cosenza =

The following is a list of the 150 municipalities (comuni) of the Province of Cosenza in the region of Calabria in Italy.

== List ==
| Municipality | Population (2026) | Area (km²) | Density |
|---|---|---|---|
| Acquaformosa | 930 | 22.71 | 41.0 |
| Acquappesa | 1,754 | 14.45 | 121.4 |
| Acri | 18,059 | 200.63 | 90.0 |
| Aiello Calabro | 1,324 | 38.51 | 34.4 |
| Aieta | 703 | 48.30 | 14.6 |
| Albidona | 1,047 | 64.67 | 16.2 |
| Alessandria del Carretto | 337 | 41.12 | 8.2 |
| Altilia | 669 | 10.56 | 63.4 |
| Altomonte | 3,943 | 65.72 | 60.0 |
| Amantea | 13,859 | 29.46 | 470.4 |
| Amendolara | 2,590 | 60.91 | 42.5 |
| Aprigliano | 2,307 | 122.43 | 18.8 |
| Belmonte Calabro | 1,664 | 23.98 | 69.4 |
| Belsito | 892 | 11.55 | 77.2 |
| Belvedere Marittimo | 8,927 | 37.09 | 240.7 |
| Bianchi | 1,141 | 33.32 | 34.2 |
| Bisignano | 9,428 | 86.20 | 109.4 |
| Bocchigliero | 1,038 | 98.82 | 10.5 |
| Bonifati | 2,504 | 33.85 | 74.0 |
| Buonvicino | 1,971 | 30.60 | 64.4 |
| Calopezzati | 1,224 | 22.57 | 54.2 |
| Caloveto | 1,046 | 24.96 | 41.9 |
| Campana | 1,337 | 104.65 | 12.8 |
| Canna | 577 | 20.37 | 28.3 |
| Cariati | 7,582 | 28.82 | 263.1 |
| Carolei | 3,027 | 15.43 | 196.2 |
| Carpanzano | 185 | 14.27 | 13.0 |
| Casali del Manco | 9,269 | 168.95 | 54.9 |
| Cassano all'Ionio | 16,337 | 159.07 | 102.7 |
| Castiglione Cosentino | 2,731 | 14.09 | 193.8 |
| Castrolibero | 9,074 | 11.56 | 784.9 |
| Castroregio | 208 | 42.06 | 4.9 |
| Castrovillari | 20,431 | 130.64 | 156.4 |
| Celico | 2,421 | 99.75 | 24.3 |
| Cellara | 473 | 5.86 | 80.7 |
| Cerchiara di Calabria | 2,074 | 81.97 | 25.3 |
| Cerisano | 2,909 | 15.32 | 189.9 |
| Cervicati | 767 | 12.09 | 63.4 |
| Cerzeto | 1,208 | 21.90 | 55.2 |
| Cetraro | 9,159 | 66.14 | 138.5 |
| Civita | 773 | 27.62 | 28.0 |
| Cleto | 1,270 | 18.98 | 66.9 |
| Colosimi | 1,077 | 25.58 | 42.1 |
| Corigliano-Rossano | 74,403 | 346.56 | 214.7 |
| Cosenza | 63,449 | 37.86 | 1,675.9 |
| Cropalati | 947 | 33.70 | 28.1 |
| Crosia | 9,616 | 21.10 | 455.7 |
| Diamante | 4,947 | 12.21 | 405.2 |
| Dipignano | 4,054 | 23.37 | 173.5 |
| Domanico | 915 | 23.66 | 38.7 |
| Fagnano Castello | 3,257 | 29.67 | 109.8 |
| Falconara Albanese | 1,507 | 19.27 | 78.2 |
| Figline Vegliaturo | 1,088 | 4.16 | 261.5 |
| Firmo | 1,758 | 11.70 | 150.3 |
| Fiumefreddo Bruzio | 3,979 | 32.06 | 124.1 |
| Francavilla Marittima | 2,708 | 33.02 | 82.0 |
| Frascineto | 1,812 | 29.11 | 62.2 |
| Fuscaldo | 7,923 | 60.80 | 130.3 |
| Grimaldi | 1,489 | 24.71 | 60.3 |
| Grisolia | 2,161 | 51.75 | 41.8 |
| Guardia Piemontese | 1,767 | 21.46 | 82.3 |
| Lago | 2,362 | 49.96 | 47.3 |
| Laino Borgo | 1,578 | 57.08 | 27.6 |
| Laino Castello | 749 | 37.33 | 20.1 |
| Lappano | 849 | 12.21 | 69.5 |
| Lattarico | 3,671 | 43.93 | 83.6 |
| Longobardi | 3,218 | 18.24 | 176.4 |
| Longobucco | 2,435 | 212.26 | 11.5 |
| Lungro | 2,046 | 35.65 | 57.4 |
| Luzzi | 8,680 | 77.60 | 111.9 |
| Maierà | 1,107 | 17.78 | 62.3 |
| Malito | 681 | 16.92 | 40.2 |
| Malvito | 1,567 | 38.24 | 41.0 |
| Mandatoriccio | 2,392 | 37.32 | 64.1 |
| Mangone | 1,895 | 12.27 | 154.4 |
| Marano Marchesato | 3,329 | 5.04 | 660.5 |
| Marano Principato | 2,995 | 6.32 | 473.9 |
| Marzi | 939 | 15.81 | 59.4 |
| Mendicino | 8,892 | 35.69 | 249.1 |
| Mongrassano | 1,446 | 35.16 | 41.1 |
| Montalto Uffugo | 19,909 | 76.67 | 259.7 |
| Montegiordano | 1,498 | 35.88 | 41.8 |
| Morano Calabro | 3,748 | 116.26 | 32.2 |
| Mormanno | 2,475 | 78.88 | 31.4 |
| Mottafollone | 1,013 | 31.58 | 32.1 |
| Nocara | 284 | 34.05 | 8.3 |
| Oriolo | 1,762 | 85.60 | 20.6 |
| Orsomarso | 1,056 | 90.41 | 11.7 |
| Paludi | 936 | 41.74 | 22.4 |
| Panettieri | 304 | 14.67 | 20.7 |
| Paola | 15,090 | 42.88 | 351.9 |
| Papasidero | 572 | 55.22 | 10.4 |
| Parenti | 1,925 | 37.62 | 51.2 |
| Paterno Calabro | 1,319 | 24.20 | 54.5 |
| Pedivigliano | 729 | 16.65 | 43.8 |
| Piane Crati | 1,278 | 2.33 | 548.5 |
| Pietrafitta | 1,118 | 9.24 | 121.0 |
| Pietrapaola | 998 | 52.82 | 18.9 |
| Plataci | 626 | 49.41 | 12.7 |
| Praia a Mare | 6,268 | 23.59 | 265.7 |
| Rende | 36,893 | 55.28 | 667.4 |
| Rocca Imperiale | 3,116 | 55.03 | 56.6 |
| Roggiano Gravina | 6,708 | 44.88 | 149.5 |
| Rogliano | 5,150 | 41.68 | 123.6 |
| Rose | 4,109 | 47.49 | 86.5 |
| Roseto Capo Spulico | 1,865 | 30.66 | 60.8 |
| Rota Greca | 891 | 13.12 | 67.9 |
| Rovito | 2,901 | 10.68 | 271.6 |
| San Basile | 882 | 18.67 | 47.2 |
| San Benedetto Ullano | 1,373 | 19.57 | 70.2 |
| San Cosmo Albanese | 540 | 11.57 | 46.7 |
| San Demetrio Corone | 2,955 | 61.87 | 47.8 |
| San Donato di Ninea | 1,030 | 82.40 | 12.5 |
| San Fili | 2,406 | 20.96 | 114.8 |
| San Giorgio Albanese | 1,256 | 22.68 | 55.4 |
| San Giovanni in Fiore | 15,328 | 282.53 | 54.3 |
| San Lorenzo Bellizzi | 501 | 40.63 | 12.3 |
| San Lorenzo del Vallo | 3,057 | 22.93 | 133.3 |
| San Lucido | 7,775 | 27.12 | 286.7 |
| San Marco Argentano | 6,769 | 80.50 | 84.1 |
| San Martino di Finita | 917 | 23.90 | 38.4 |
| San Nicola Arcella | 2,018 | 11.69 | 172.6 |
| San Pietro in Amantea | 446 | 9.84 | 45.3 |
| San Pietro in Guarano | 3,298 | 48.35 | 68.2 |
| San Sosti | 1,839 | 43.55 | 42.2 |
| San Vincenzo La Costa | 1,930 | 18.42 | 104.8 |
| Sangineto | 1,202 | 27.51 | 43.7 |
| Sant'Agata di Esaro | 1,703 | 47.63 | 35.8 |
| Santa Caterina Albanese | 1,052 | 17.34 | 60.7 |
| Santa Domenica Talao | 1,127 | 36.12 | 31.2 |
| Santa Maria del Cedro | 5,179 | 18.42 | 281.2 |
| Santa Sofia d'Epiro | 2,081 | 39.22 | 53.1 |
| Santo Stefano di Rogliano | 1,736 | 19.56 | 88.8 |
| Saracena | 3,234 | 109.15 | 29.6 |
| Scala Coeli | 734 | 67.50 | 10.9 |
| Scalea | 11,792 | 22.56 | 522.7 |
| Scigliano | 1,095 | 17.46 | 62.7 |
| Serra d'Aiello | 521 | 4.51 | 115.5 |
| Spezzano Albanese | 6,388 | 32.26 | 198.0 |
| Spezzano della Sila | 4,304 | 80.29 | 53.6 |
| Tarsia | 1,818 | 48.28 | 37.7 |
| Terranova da Sibari | 4,441 | 43.46 | 102.2 |
| Terravecchia | 553 | 20.12 | 27.5 |
| Torano Castello | 4,255 | 30.22 | 140.8 |
| Tortora | 5,919 | 58.22 | 101.7 |
| Trebisacce | 8,582 | 26.72 | 321.2 |
| Vaccarizzo Albanese | 1,010 | 8.53 | 118.4 |
| Verbicaro | 2,489 | 32.64 | 76.3 |
| Villapiana | 5,612 | 39.73 | 141.3 |
| Zumpano | 2,589 | 8.08 | 320.4 |

== See also ==
- List of municipalities of Calabria
- List of municipalities of Italy
