= 1638 Calabrian earthquakes =

Series of four earthquakes in Italy

1638 Calabria earthquakes
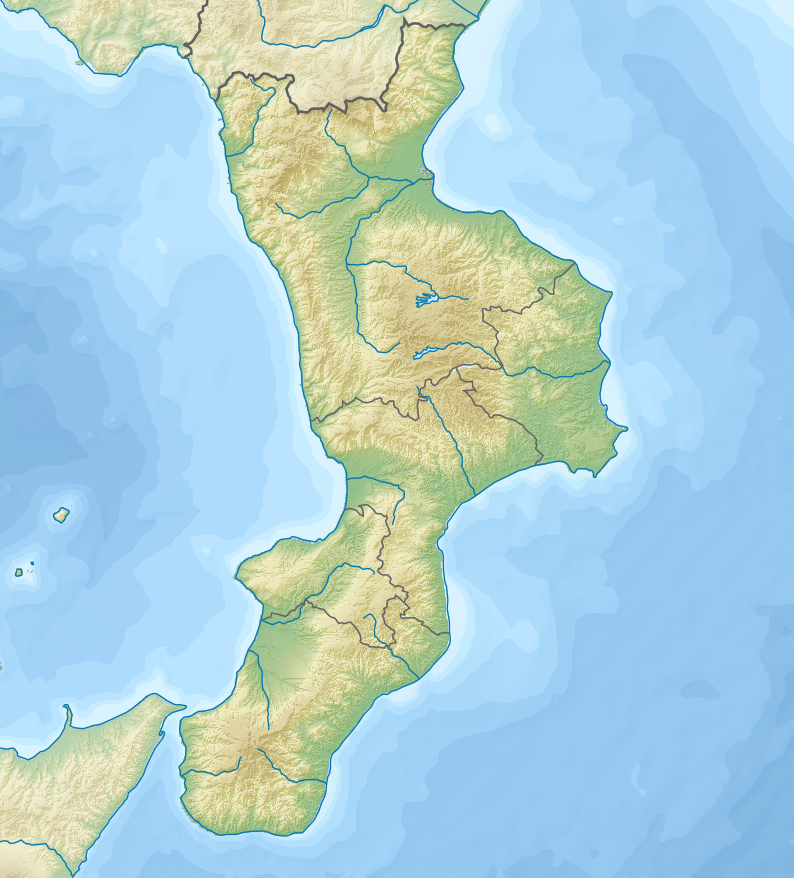
- Location within Calabria
- Local date: March 27, 1638
- Local time: 21:30
- Magnitude: M_{w} 6.8–7.1 (March 27)
- Depth: 15 km (9 mi)
- Epicenter: 39.05°N 16.29°E
- Areas affected: Calabria, Kingdom of Naples (present-day Italy)
- Max. intensity: MMI XI (Extreme)
- Tsunami: Uncertain
- Casualties: 9,581–30,000

A series of mainshocks struck Calabria on March 27–28 and June 9, 1638. The first three earthquakes had moment magnitudes estimated to be M_{w} 6.6–7.1. On June 9, another mainshock estimated at M_{w} 6.7 struck the same region, causing further damage and casualties. The four earthquakes resulted in as many as 30,000 fatalities.

== Tectonic setting ==
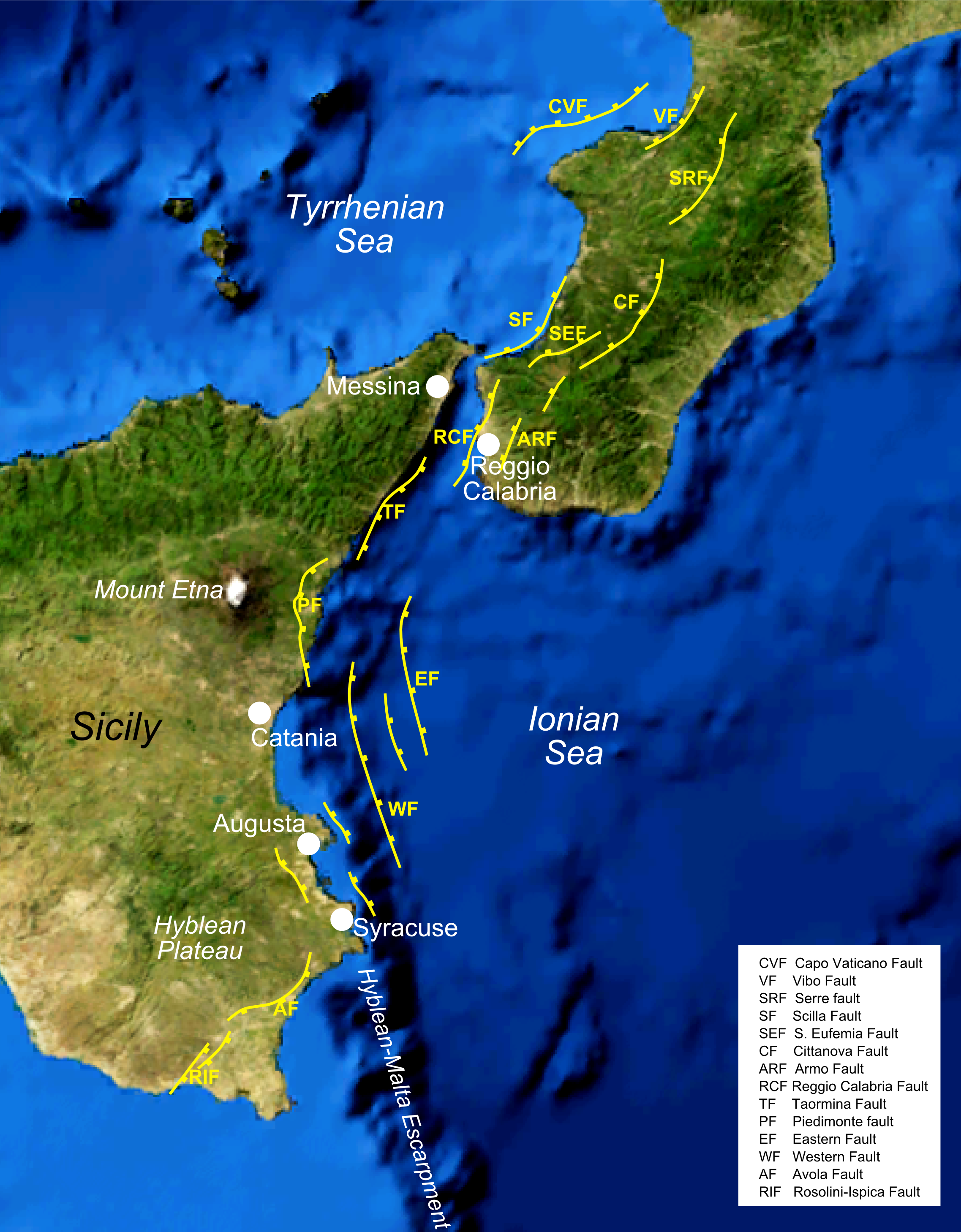
Major faults associated with the Siculo-Calabrian rift

The region of Calabria is located between the Tyrrhenian and Ionian Seas, where active extension is ongoing. Extension is accommodated by normal faults on the Tyrrhenian side in Calabria. The trend of normal faults extend southwards to the Strait of Messina, where they occur on the Ionian side in Sicily. Known as the Siculo-Calabrian rift, this active geological feature is characterized by its high seismicity of earthquakes up to M_{w} 7.1.

== Geology ==
Historical documents suggests three large earthquakes occurred between March 27 and 28. The earthquake of March 27 occurred within the Crati Valley fault system, with the Piano Lago and Savuto–Decollatura faults as possible sources. The March 28 earthquakes may have ruptured the Mesima fault system and Santa Eufemia–Feroleto fault. However, no conclusive field data have been collected to identify the faults responsible for the March earthquakes.

The Lake Fault, which produced a surface rupture, was responsible for the June 9 earthquake, based on rich historical documentation and paleoseismology. This normal fault dips to the southwest and offsets the surface vertically. Two slightly weaker earthquakes struck the same region in 1832 and 1836. The June 9 earthquake caused a large surface-fault rupture measuring 96.6 km (60.0 mi) long and 0.8 m (2 ft 7 in) tall. The fault rupture was visible, extending from Petilia Policastro to Sila, near the eastern shore of Ampollino Lake.

=== Summary of events ===
Based on analysis of the first-hand documentation, historiography and literary works during the 17th century, three mainshocks were identified: one on March 27 and two on March 28. Italy's National Institute of Geophysics and Volcanology only identified two mainshocks in their catalogue.

Location	Date	Time	Coordinates	Magnitude (M_{w})	Magnitude (M_{e}, INGV)	Intensity (MCS)
Savuto Valley	March 27	15:05 (GMT)	39.11°N 16.27°E	6.8–7.1	7.0	XI
Serre Calabresi	March 28	"day"	38.68°N 16.23°E	6.6	-	X
Santa Eufemia plain	March 28	"day"	38.96°N 16.26°E	6.6	-	XI
La Sila plateau	June 9	"evening"	39.22°N 16.57°E	6.7	6.9	X–XI

== Damage and casualties ==
The official number of deaths stood at 9,571, including 6,811 in Calabria Citeriore and 2,760 in Calabria Ulteriore. The total number of dead was likely higher as these figures did not account for the many deaths that occurred in the months following the first earthquake due to injuries and deprivation.

On March 27, at about 15:05 GMT (21:30 local time), the first and most destructive earthquake struck with an epicenter in the Savuto Valle or near the upper Crati River. It reached a Mercalli–Cancani–Sieberg intensity of X–XI in the heavily populated communes of Martirano, Rogliano, Santo Stefano di Rogliano, Grimaldi, Motta Santa Lucia, Marzi and Carpanzano. The earthquake destroyed much of the settlements in those towns. The town of Amantea suffered severe damage, while minor damage was reported at Maratea. According to Ettore Capecelatro, a jurist and official of the Kingdom of Naples, more than 10,000 homes were destroyed, while another 3,000 were rendered unsafe for habitation. Luca Cellesi, the bishop of the Roman Catholic Diocese of Martirano, was injured during the collapse of his castle in the town of Pedivigliano, where he reported that the population of his diocese fell from 12,000 to 6,500 after the quake. In Aiello Calabro, 408 homes were obliterated and 655 residents were killed. At least 116 inhabitants were killed in Belsito, 234 in Grimaldi, 495 in Carpanzano, 229 in Conflenti, 173 in Malito, 532 in Motta Sta Lucia, 1,200 in Nicastro, 102 in Piane Crati, 216 in Sambiase, 451 in Scigliano Diano and 126 in Feroleto. The town of Martirano was destroyed and 517 inhabitants were killed.

Following the earthquake, the affected areas saw a decrease in population from migration. Many inhabitants of Motta Santa Lucia moved to Decollatura, and residents of Pedivigliano and Pittarella moved to Sila. Survivors from Scigliano and Carpanzano relocated to the Ionian coast and formed the communes of Mandatoriccio and Savelli.

The two earthquakes on March 28 occurred further south in Calabria on Palm Sunday. One of the two shocks' epicenters was near Nicastro, where 1,200 people were killed. More than 500 of the total deaths in the city resulted from the collapse of a church. Many more residents were killed in Lamezia Terme, Falerna, Feroleto Antico and Sant'Eufemia Lamezia. The March 27 quake caused a tsunami in the Gulf of Saint Euphemia. Damage at Sant'Eufemia Lamezia was so severe that the town was abandoned.

A second shock occurred in the Serre Calabresi. The March earthquakes caused fissures to appear in the ground, some of which emitted sulfurous gases. The earthquake caused severe damage in Rosarno, Mileto, Borrello and Briatico, while the town center of Castelmonardo was almost completely destroyed.

The June 9 nighttime earthquake registered a magnitude of 6.7 and a maximum Mercalli–Cancani–Sieberg intensity of X. It affected the region of Sila, where six villages were destroyed. Very severe damage was reported in Catanzaro and Crotone, as well as in 13 other villages. It was preceded by two strong foreshocks at dawn and noon of the previous day, alerting many residents to stay outdoors. Despite the severity of damage, only 52 people were killed.

== Aftermath ==
Shortly after the March earthquakes, Ettore Capecelatro, an official from the Kingdom of Naples was ordered to survey the damaged area. He completed his mission at the end of May. His survey became the basis for the government's decision on distributing aid and assistance. The Neapolitan court wanted to reduce revenue loss by rebuilding production and creating new business opportunities. Villages and towns where property were destroyed or had people killed were completely exempted from paying tax for five years. There were a total of 36 villages given the five-year tax relief. Forty-five villages which were categorised as "damaged but not destroyed" were given one year of tax relief. Several villages made appeals for their tax exemption re-evaluated after the June earthquake.

== See also ==
- List of earthquakes in Italy
- List of historical earthquakes

== Bibliography ==
- Galli, Paolo; Bosi, Vittorio (2003). "Catastrophic 1638 earthquakes in Calabria (southern Italy): New insights from paleoseismological investigation". Journal of Geophysical Research: Solid Earth. 108 (B1). American Geophysical Union: ETG 1-1-ETG 1–20. Bibcode:2003JGRB..108.2004G. doi:10.1029/2001JB001713. S2CID 55937014.
- Jacques, E.; Monaco, C.; Tapponnier, P.; Tortorici, L.; Winter, T. (2001). "Faulting and earthquake triggering during the 1783 Calabria seismic sequence" (PDF). Geophysical Journal International. 147 (3): 499–516. Bibcode:2001GeoJI.147..499J. doi:10.1046/j.0956-540x.2001.01518.x. ISSN 1365-246X. S2CID 59505619.
- Villella, V. (1986). I terremoti del '600 nella relazione di Limina dei Vescovi di Nicastro e Martirano (in Italian). Vol. 38. Calabria Sconosciuta.
- d'Orsi, Lutio (1640). I terremoti delle due Calavrie fedelissimamente descritti (in Italian). Naples.
- Bonacci, Pietro (1982). Decollatura, vicende sociali e religiose dal Seicento all'Ottocento. Decollatura: Grafica Reventino.
- Marasco, Mario Felice (1969). Soveria Mannelli e il suo territorio, Notizie e dati tratti dagli appunti di Ivone Sirianni (in Italian). San Vito al Tagliamento: Tipografia Sanvitese Ellerani.
- Trumper, John B.; Maddalon, Marta; Chiodo, Giovanna (1995). "L'influenza di eventi macrosismici su alcune discontinuità linguistiche (Calabria)". In Pellegrini, Giovan Battista (ed.). Saggi dialettologici in area italo-romanza, nuova raccolta (in Italian). Padova: Centro Studio per la Dialettologia Italiana «0. Parlangeli»; Consiglio Nazionale delle Ricerche.
