= Grimaldi, Calabria =

Grimaldi Grimaudo
- Comune
- Comune di Grimaldi
- Panorama of the old town

- Location within Italy Location within Calabria
- Coordinates: 39°08′33″N 16°14′3″E
- Country: Italy
- Region: Calabria
- Province: Cosenza (CS)

Government
  - Mayor: Roberto De Marco

Area
  - Total: 24.71 km^{2} (9.54 sq mi)
- Elevation: 650 m (2,130 ft)

Population (30 April 2017)
  - Total: 1,667
  - Density: 67.46/km^{2} (174.7/sq mi)
- Demonym: Grimaldesi
- Time zone: UTC+1 (CET)
  - Summer (DST): UTC+2 (CEST)
- Postal code: 87034
- Dialing code: 0984
- Patron saint: Saint Peter and Saint Paul
- Saint day: 29 June
- Website: Official website

Grimaldi is a town and comune in the province of Cosenza in the Calabria region of southern Italy. Grimaldi is referred to as Grimaldo in historic documents. In the local Calabrian dialect (a variation of Cosentino), the town is called Grimàudu or Grimàuru, and the residents Grimaudisi, although the Italian versions (Grimaldi and Grimaldesi) are today prevalent.

== Geography ==
Grimaldi is located 29 km (18 mi) from Cosenza and rises to 650m above sea level. The territory of the municipality lies between 150 and 1,256 metres (492 and 4,120 ft.) above sea level. The comune extends from the Santa Lucerna mountains to the Savuto river valley to the south.

== History ==
It is likely that Grimaldi owes its origins to the devastation experienced by the ancient territory of Pandosia, after the year 475 CE. The first settlement in the area may have been a small casale (hamlet) named Santa Caterina, around the year 872, when much of Calabria was experiencing the battles between the Lombards, the Byzantines and the Saracens. Other casali appeared, such as those at San Pietro and San Stefano. According to some scholars, the name Grimaldi evolved from Grimoald I (c. 610-671), duke of Benevento and king of the Lombards, whose domains included Apulia, Calabria, and Ancona. The name was originally applied to the entire territory. Thus, while there is no certainty that the Lombards founded the city, there is no doubt that they were present and had integrated into the population, well before their defeat at the start of the 11th century.

The present-day town may have been founded between 1027 and 1034, in the aftermath of the Norman invasion, when due to natural calamities and pestilence all of the Grimaldesi moved to the slopes of the Santa Lucerna mountains. During the period of Angevin, Aragonese and Spanish rule of the Kingdom of Naples, Grimaldi found itself in isolation, the main routes from Cosenza to Aiello being along the Savuto river to the south (then navigable). In 1369, Joan I of Naples sent a royal delegation to nearby Tinisi to divide the territories of Grimaldo and Mendicino from the territory of Aiello. From this time, until 1510, there were a series of disputes and battles between the casale di Grimaldo and the count of Ajello, Francesco Siscar, who had intentions of occupying Grimaldi. In 1481, Paolo Siscar, count of Cirella, became the lord of Grimaldo, but the Grimaudisi avoided feudal obligations by paying 1000 ducati.

In 1638, the original Grimaldo was destroyed by an earthquake, and the town was rebuilt in an area known as "Chiata" (from where the district 'mpedichiati developed, meaning literally "at Chiata's feet"). In 1639 the rebuilding of the original Grimaldi began (vecchio Grimaldo).

As with most towns in Southern Italy, Grimaldi contributed significantly to the Italian diaspora of the late 19th and early to mid- 20th centuries. The most recent wave of migrants, from the post-war years to the early 1970s, saw residents migrate to northern and central Italy, and many immigrated abroad, primarily to the United States, Canada, Germany and Belgium. In Canada, there is a large population of descendants from Grimaldi in London, Ontario, Vancouver, Burnaby, Edmonton, Kamloops, Trail, Toronto and Thunder Bay, Ontario.

== Demographics ==
In 1991 Grimaldi's population was 2,055 residents; however, in 2001 this figure dropped to 1,870, showing a decline in the decade 1991 - 2001 of -9.00%. At its peak census figure, in 1951, Grimaldi had a population of 3,786.

The residents are distributed amongst 714 households, with an average of 2.62 persons per household.

== Sights ==
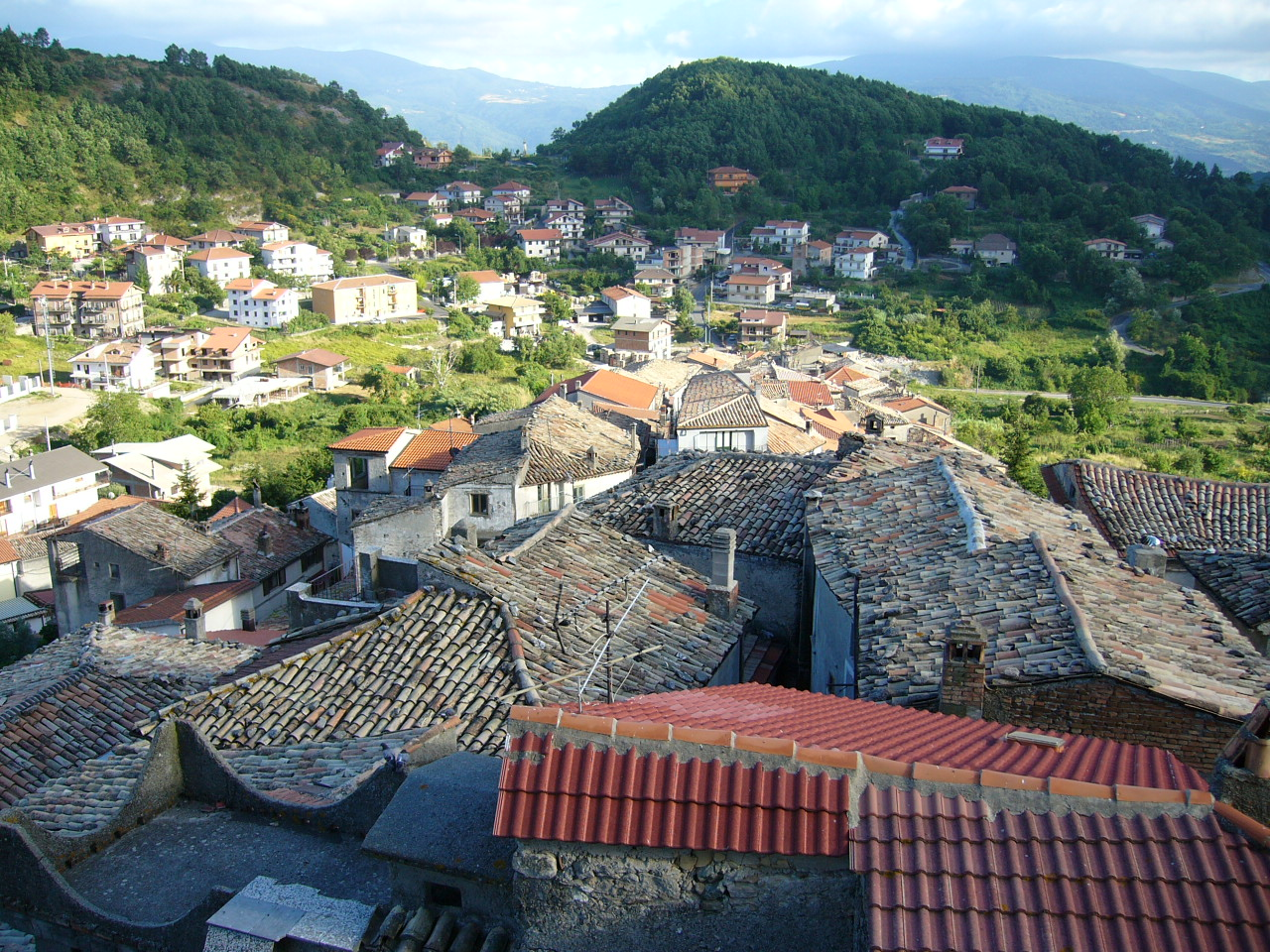
View towards la Foce

- Chiesa Madre (dei SS apostoli Pietro e Paolo), central church
- Sant'Antonio Church and Convent
- La Foce church and viewpoint

== Adjacent communities ==
Aiello Calabro, Altilia (including the frazione Maione, which is very near), Domanico, Lago, Malito, Martirano (Province of Catanzaro)

== See also ==
- Savuto river
- Savuto wine
