= Santo Stefano di Rogliano =

Commune in Calabria, Italy

- Comune
- Comune di Santo Stefano di Rogliano
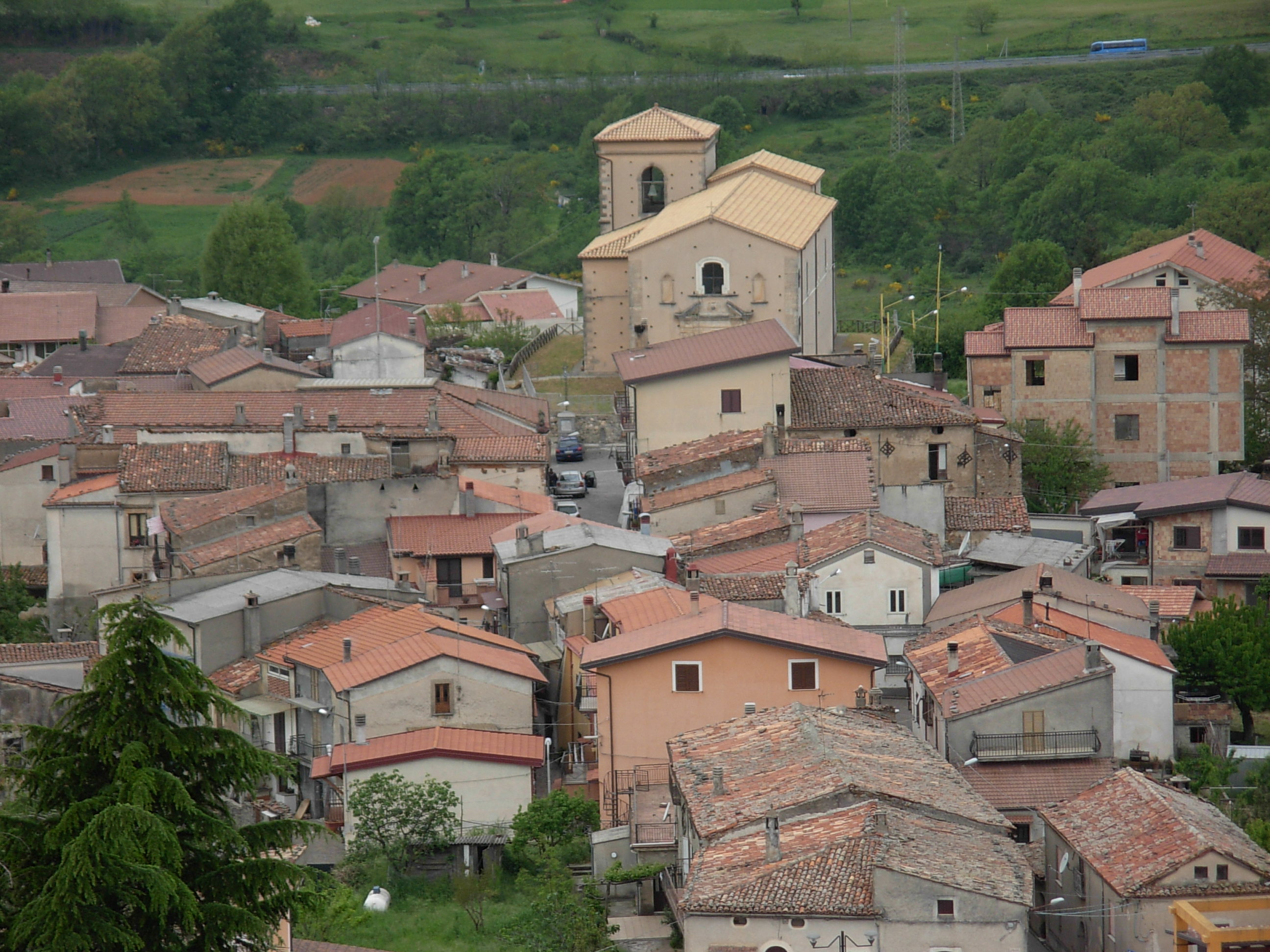

- Location within Italy Location within Calabria
- Coordinates: 39°12′N 16°19′E
- Country: Italy
- Region: Calabria
- Province: Cosenza (CS)

Government
  - Mayor: Lucia Nicoletti

Area
  - Total: 19.56 km^{2} (7.55 sq mi)
- Elevation: 663 m (2,175 ft)

Population (2018-01-01)
  - Total: 1,398
  - Density: 71.47/km^{2} (185.1/sq mi)
- Time zone: UTC+1 (CET)
  - Summer (DST): UTC+2 (CEST)
- Postal code: 87056
- Dialing code: 0984
- Website: Official website

Santo Stefano di Rogliano is a village and comune in the province of Cosenza in the Calabria region of southern Italy.

The village is bordered by Aprigliano, Cellara, Mangone, Marzi, Paterno Calabro and Rogliano.

== See also ==
- Savuto river
