= San Mango d'Aquino =

- Comune
- Comune di San Mango d'Aquino
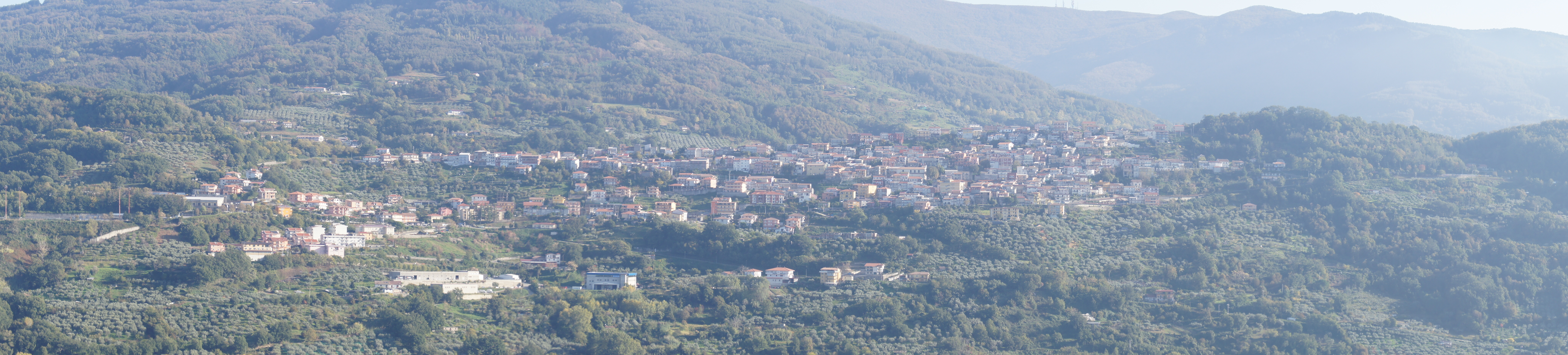

- Location within Italy Location within Calabria
- Coordinates: 39°4′N 16°12′E
- Country: Italy
- Region: Calabria
- Province: Catanzaro (CZ)

Government
  - Mayor: Gianmarco Cimino

Area
  - Total: 6 km^{2} (2.3 sq mi)
- Elevation: 450 m (1,480 ft)

Population (30 September 2012)
  - Total: 1,623
  - Density: 270/km^{2} (700/sq mi)
- Demonym: Sammanghesi
- Time zone: UTC+1 (CET)
  - Summer (DST): UTC+2 (CEST)
- Postal code: 88040
- Dialing code: 0968
- Patron saint: Thomas Aquinas
- Saint day: 27 January
- Website: Official website

San Mango d'Aquino (Sammanghese: Santu Mangu) is a town and comune in the province of Catanzaro, in the Calabria region of southern Italy. This town was recently rejuvenated by several construction programs designed to improve access for tourism.

The town is bordered by Cleto, Martirano Lombardo and Nocera Terinese.

== See also ==
- Savuto river
