= Wally Rodriguez =

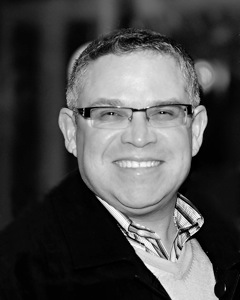
- Born: 1960 (age 65–66); Mexico City, Mexico
- Education: Loyola University New Orleans
- Occupations: Director of Visual Effects, UPSTAIRS
- Website: http://upstairsefx.com

Wally Rodriguez was born in 1960 in Mexico City, Mexico. Rodriguez is the current Director of Visual Effects at UPSTAIRS, a post production facility located in Miami, FL which he co-founded with Anabella Sosa. With over 20 years of experience, he is a specialist in visual effects. Rodriguez was also the second client to use Autodesk Flame, the premier visual effects software.

Rodriguez has developed special effects for multinational brands such as McDonald's, Corona, Honda, Ford, American Airlines, MTV Europe, AT&T, Verizon, Tide, and Heineken among others. Agencies like Leo Burnett, Saatchi & Saatchi, Conill Advertising, and DDB have relied on his skills. The Mexican government chose UPSTAIRS to develop a multimedia presentation to celebrate the Bicentennial of the Mexican Revolution, for which Rodriguez created original visualization tools. Rodriguez has been the supervisor of visual effects for such renowned directors as Eduadro McClaine, Fernando Trueba, Augusto Jiménez Zapiola, and Mauro Fiore, director of photography for the 2009 film Avatar.

Rodriguez graduated from Loyola University New Orleans in 1982 with a major in computer science and a minor in graphic arts.
