= Calabrian earthquakes =

Calabrian earthquakes may refer to:

- 1638 Calabrian earthquakes
- 1783 Calabrian earthquakes
