= Terina (ancient city) =

Ancient Greek city in Calabria, Italy

- Τερίνα (Ancient Greek)
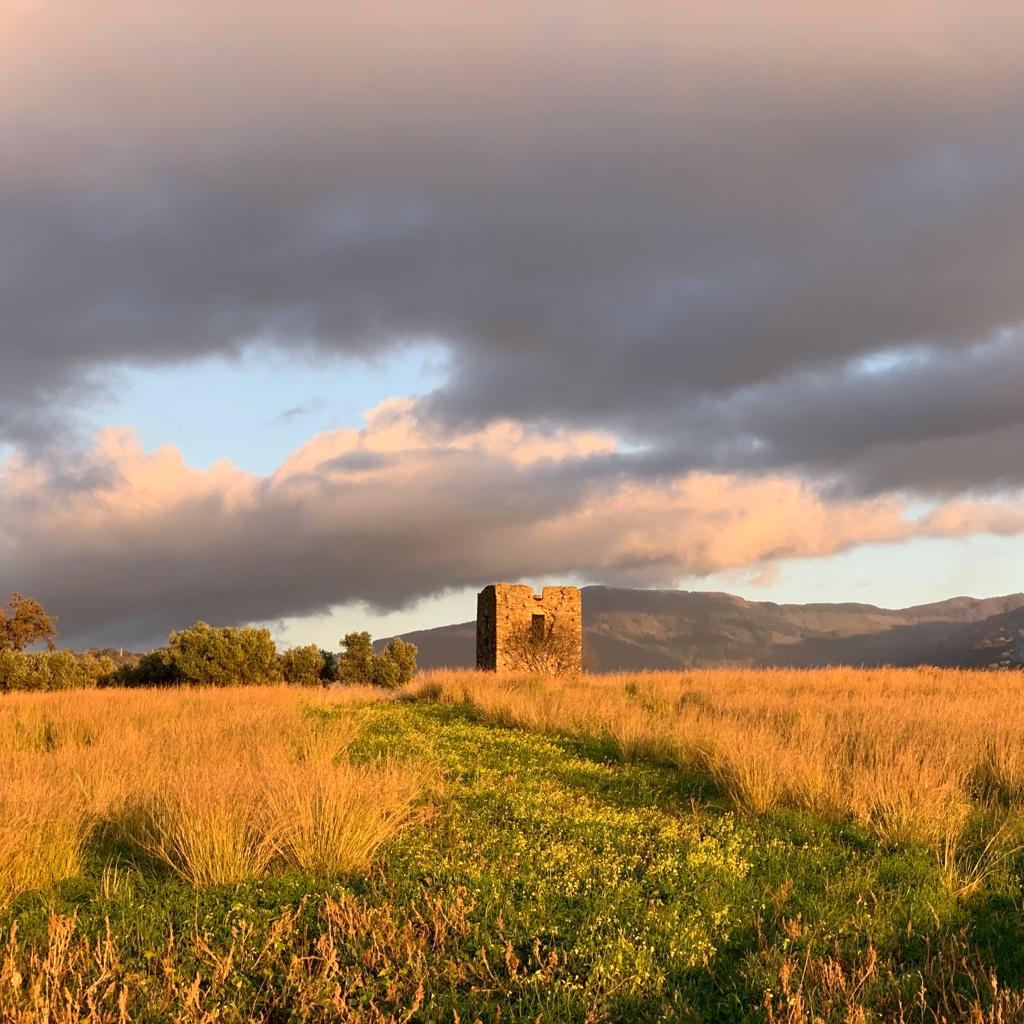
- The site of Terina in 2020.

- Location within Italy
- 38°56′22″N 16°14′2″E
- Periods: Classical Greece to Roman Empire
- Location: Lamezia Terme, Province of Catanzaro, Calabria, Italy

History
- Built: 480–470 BC
- Built by: Settlers from Croton

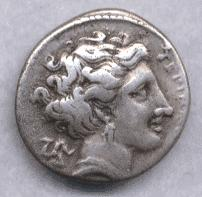
Coin from Terina

Terina (Ancient Greek: Τερίνα and Τέρινα) was an ancient city located on the Piano di Tirena hill in Nocera Terinese about 20 km (12 mi) from Lamezia Terme in Calabria. The site of the city was allegedly found in 1922 by the archaeologist Paolo Orsi near the modern village of Sant'Eufemia Vetere. A systematic archaeological investigation was made from 1997 and coins, inscriptions and other artefacts retrieved from the site can be seen in the Museo Archeologico Lametino in Lamezia Terme.

The site is surrounded by two rivers, Savuto and Grande and matches the description by Strabo written around 20 AD.

== History ==
In the fifth century BC the Greek cities Croton and Locri, both located on the Ionian Sea, vied for the control of ports on the Tyrrhenian Sea. These ports were important for conducting trade. Locri had founded the cities Medma and Hipponium there and had assumed control of Metauros. Temesa lay north of Hipponium and had close relations with Croton, which may have been its mother city. Temesa was valuable because of its copper mines and its trade with the north. Locri conquered Temesa at some time in the first half of the fifth century BC, probably in the 480s or 470s. Croton was disadvantaged by the loss and founded Terina at this time to compensate. Terina's foundation is dated to 480–470 BC. It started minting its own coins sometime after 480 BC, which indicates that it soon became independent from its mother city.

Terina became a prosperous city and protected the route from the Tyrrhenian Sea to Croton. Later in the second half of the fifth century BC Terina was attacked by Thurii, after that city's foundation in 444/3 BC. Thurii wanted to capture Terina because the city was closely connected with Croton, Thurii's enemy. The Spartan general Cleandridas who led the Thurian army planned a surprise attack, but this failed when his army was discovered. He retreated after ravaging the city's countryside.

When the Bruttians arose as a new ethnic group in Lucania in 356/5 BC their first target was Terina, which they besieged and plundered. When Alexander of Epirus arrived in Southern Italy in approximately 333 BC he took the city from the Bruttians. He did not possess it for long because he was defeated by a combined army of Bruttians and Lucanians at the Battle of Pandosia in 331 BC. At some later point Terina became a Roman possession. It was ultimately destroyed in the Second Punic War by Hannibal because he could not defend the city during his stay in Bruttium.

The city was rebuilt at some point because it is mentioned again by Pliny the Elder.

Material evidence of the presence of an ancient settlement in the area of Sant'Eufemia dates to 1865, when a gold diadem and a treasure of jewels of the 4th century BC were found by chance. At the end of the same century the treasure was sold to the British Museum, where it is still preserved today.

Terina is linked to the myth of Ligea, one of the three Sirens of Homer's Odyssey.

== Sources ==
=== Primary sources ===
- Polyaenus (1793). Shepherd, R. (ed.). Stratagems in War. London.
- Diodorus Siculus (1939). Oldfather, C. H. (ed.). Library of History. Vol. 7. Cambridge, Massachusetts: Harvard University Press. ISBN 978-0-674-99428-7.
- Justin (1853). Watson, John Selby (ed.). Epitome of the Philippic History of Pompeius Trogus. London: Henry G. Bohn.
- Livy (1926). Foster, B. O. (ed.). History of Rome. Vol. 4. Cambridge, Massachusetts: Harvard University Press. ISBN 978-0-674-99210-8.
- Pliny the Elder (1855). Bostock, John; Riley, H. T. (eds.). Natural History. London: Taylor and Francis.
- Strabo (1924). Jones, H. L. (ed.). Geography. Vol. 3. Cambridge, Massachusetts: Harvard University Press. ISBN 978-0-674-99201-6.

=== Secondary sources ===
- Bicknell, Peter (1966). "The Date of the Battle of the Sagra River". Phoenix. 20 (4): 294–301. doi:10.2307/1087054. JSTOR 1087054.
- Cerchiai, Luca; Jannelli, Lorena; Longo, Fausto, eds. (2004). The Greek Cities of Magna Graecia and Sicily. Translated from Italian by the J. Paul Getty Trust. Los Angeles, California: Getty Publications. ISBN 978-0-89236-751-1.
- Wonder, John W. (2012). "The Italiote League: South Italian Alliances of the Fifth and Fourth Centuries BC". Classical Antiquity. 31 (1): 128–151. doi:10.1525/CA.2012.31.1.128.
