= Cara DeVito =

American journalist

Cara DeVito (born 1951) is an American video producer, journalist, visual artist and video artist. A graduate of Beloit College, she received her BA in psychology and photography in 1973. She was awarded a Nieman Fellowship by Harvard University in 1998.

== Early life and education ==
DeVito was born to Italian-American parents. Her grandmother, Adelina "Adeline" Elia, was born in Aprigliano, Italy, and immigrated to Brooklyn in 1920. She attended Beloit College in Beloit, Wisconsin and graduated in 1973 with a bachelor's degree in psychology and photography

== Work ==
Shortly after graduating from Beloit College, DeVito worked as a teaching assistant at the Video Study Center of Global Village. It was during this time that she produced Ama L'Uomo Tuo. She would go on to work as a video producer at the University of Minnesota, and would continue teaching until 1978, when she began working as a documentary film producer at the Foundation for Independent Video and Film in New York City. While at the Foundation for Independent Video and Film, she produced the documentary What Could You Do with a Nickel, which was nominated for an Emmy Award in the Outstanding Documentary category. Following this success, she went on to work for NBC as a staff editor and video journalist for eighteen years. She has since worked at Bard College, the Franklin D. Roosevelt Presidential Library, and Films of You, where she currently works as a documentary producer.

== Ama L'Uomo Tuo ==
Ama L'Uomo Tuo (Always Love Your Man) is an 18:52 minute-long documentary centered on DeVito's grandmother's life. Produced in 1975, two years after the death of her grandfather, Liborio Logiudice (LeJudas), the work explores Adeline's turbulent marriage, recounting her experiences of violence, a forced illegal abortion, and abuse. In the video, Adeline shares her views on marriage and housewifery, expressing that it is '"the most important job, the most important thing in life," she says. "My husband trained me, Cara. Fix the table in the morning, so when people comes, you have nothing to do but greet the guests. Fifty years with the same man! Prepare! Wash! Cook!"' Produced in a time when gendered violence first gained mainstream awareness, Ama L'Uomo Tuo is in dialogue with the practices of consciousness raising groups, an early feminist movement.

The documentary has been described by the Video Data Bank as "an example of a very sympathetic documentary." While the Electronic Arts Intermix refers to it as classic, a "character study and social commentary" and "a telling critique of patriarchal society." In "Early Feminist Projects", Martha Gever discusses Ama L'Uomo Tuo "as a biography centered on her (Adeline's) fifty-year marriage and her husband's violence toward her." Which she follows by discussing the reasoning behind staying in the marriage, as well as the chilling implications of the final line: "ama l'uomo tuo, always love your man."
