= Temesa (ancient city) =

Ancient Italian city

Temesa (Ancient Greek: Τεμέση or Τεμέσα [Doric]), later called Tempsa, was an ancient city in Italy, on the shore of the Tyrrhenian Sea. It was situated close to Terina, but its precise location has not yet been found. It is thought to have been located near the Savuto river to the north of the Gulf of Sant'Euphemia. More recently Campora San Giovanni, a town near the mouth of the Savuto, has been considered as a more precise location. The archeologist Gioacchino Francesco La Torre excavated a temple outside the town in the early 2000s, which was within the territory of Temesa.

In the Odyssey, book one, line 180, Athena, pretending to be the Taphian lord Mentes, says that she is on her way to Temesa to exchange her iron for their copper.

== History ==
According to Strabo it was founded by the Ausones, an Italic tribe, and was settled by Aetolian Greeks under Thoas later. It came under the control of Sybaris at some later point, but passed to Croton after it defeated Sybaris in 510/09 BC. Locri conquered Temesa at some time in the first half of the fifth century BC, probably in the 480s or 470s. Croton was disadvantaged by the loss because Temesa had valuable copper mines and opportunities for trade with the north. It founded Terina close to Temesa at this time to compensate.

Croton probably did not lose control of Temesa for long, because Temesan coins from the middle of the fifth century BC still carry Croton's tripod symbol. Based on the coins La Torre concludes that Locri's invasion did not result in the conquest of Temesa, but De Sensi Sestito disagrees with this conclusion. She thinks an unsuccessful invasion would not have explained the failure to rebuild the excavated temple or the larger decline of Temesa and its eclipse by Terina. The coins do not cover the precise period of 480 to 460 BC, and some coins from this period have Temesa's legend erased and replaced with a legend of Croton. This suggests that Croton continued to recognize and validate Temesa's coinage, but that it did not exercise control over the city itself. Nicholson thus concludes that Locri controlled Temesa possibly from around 480 to the late 460s BC.

In 194 BC the city became a colonia of the Roman Republic after the Romans had driven out the Bruttians, who had taken the city from the Greeks. Pausanias notes that the city was still inhabited in his own time, the second century AD. Its copper mines had already been exhausted by the time Strabo was writing, around the end of the first century BC.

=== The Hero of Temesa ===
Pausanias also relates a ghost story which took place in Temesa. It was said that Odysseus was carried down to the shores of Italy and Sicily by storms after the sack of Troy. Temesa was one of the cities he visited. Here one of his sailors got drunk and raped a local woman, for which he was stoned to death by the inhabitants. Odysseus was indifferent to this and sailed away.

The stoned man returned as a daimôn called the 'Hero' to kill the inhabitants of Temesa at random. The inhabitants wanted to flee from their city, but the Pythian oracle forbade them to do so. The oracle ordered them to build a temple for the Hero and sacrifice the most beautiful maiden to him every year. This appeased the Hero and stopped the attacks.

Just when a maiden was sent to the temple to be sacrificed Euthymus of Locri, a boxer and Olympic victor, arrived at Temesa. He fell in love with the maiden, who swore to marry him if he saved her. Euthymus lay in wait for the Hero in the temple and won the fight. The Hero was driven out and sank in the depths of the sea, Euthymus got married and Temesa was freed from the ghost forever.

Strabo gives a shorter version of the same story. In his version, the Hero is Polites, one of the crewmembers of Odysseus. Furthermore, no drunkenness and rape is involved: instead he was "treacherously slain by the barbarians" and collected taxes rather than maidens.

Nicholson argues that the story was invented during the time Locri controlled Temesa. Possibly the expulsion of the hero by the Locrian Euthymus served to express the conquest of the city by Locri.

== Sources ==
=== Primary sources ===
- Pausanias (1918). Jones, W. H. S. (ed.). Description of Greece. Vol. 3. Cambridge, Massachusetts: Harvard University Press. ISBN 978-0-674-99300-6.
- Livy (1935). Sage, Evan T. (ed.). History of Rome. Vol. 9. Cambridge, Massachusetts: Harvard University Press. ISBN 978-0-674-99326-6.
- Pliny the Elder (1855). Bostock, John; Riley, H. T. (eds.). Natural History. London: Taylor and Francis.
- Strabo (1924). Jones, H. L. (ed.). Geography. Vol. 3. Cambridge, Massachusetts: Harvard University Press. ISBN 978-0-674-99201-6.

=== Secondary sources ===
- Cerchiai, Luca; Jannelli, Lorena; Longo, Fausto, eds. (2004). The Greek Cities of Magna Graecia and Sicily. Translated from Italian by the J. Paul Getty Trust. Los Angeles, California: Getty Publications. ISBN 978-0-89236-751-1.
- Nicholson, Nigel (2013). "Cultural Studies, Oral Tradition, and the Promise of Intertextuality". American Journal of Philology. 134 (1): 9–21. doi:10.1353/ajp.2013.0006.
- Wonder, John W. (2012). "The Italiote League: South Italian Alliances of the Fifth and Fourth Centuries BC". Classical Antiquity. 31 (1): 128–151. doi:10.1525/CA.2012.31.1.128.
