= Mauro Fiore =

Italian-American cinematographer (born 1964)

- Born: November 15, 1964 (age 61); Marzi, Calabria, Italy
- Education: Columbia College Chicago (B.A., 1987); AFI Conservatory
- Occupation: Cinematographer
- Years active: 1986–present
- Spouse: Christine Vollmer (m. 2000)
- Children: 3

Mauro Fiore, ASC (born November 15, 1964) is an Italian-American cinematographer. He won the Academy Award for Best Cinematography for his work on Avatar (2009).

== Early life ==
Fiore was born in Marzi, Calabria and moved to the US with his family in 1971. He attended Palatine High School in Palatine, Illinois, and graduated in 1982. He started out pursuing a career in sociology but was captivated by photography and art. He went on to receive his B.A. from Columbia College Chicago in 1987 and moved to Los Angeles to jumpstart his career. He graduated from the AFI Conservatory, where he met cinematographers Janusz Kamiński and Phedon Papamichael.

== Career ==
Early in his career, he worked with fellow Columbia College and AFI graduate Janusz Kamiński, initially on B movies before the two gradually worked their way up into higher-profile projects. He was Kamiński's grip, his camera operator, and eventually his second unit photographer on The Lost World: Jurassic Park and Amistad (both 1997). He was the director of photography on Kamiński's directorial debut, Lost Souls (2000).

Fiore shot 17 episodes of the television series Tracey Takes On.... His first major motion picture credit as cinematographer was the Sylvester Stallone vehicle Get Carter (2000). He established a partnership with director Antoine Fuqua, beginning with Training Day (2001), and has shot six more of the director's films since.

His other feature film credits during this time included Wayne Wang's The Center of the World (2001), Michael Bay's The Island (2005), and Joe Carnahan's Smokin' Aces (2006) and The A-Team (2010).

Fiore shot James Cameron's Avatar (2009), where he and the director utilized a variety of cutting-edge techniques to combine a live-action shoot with computer-generated characters and environments. Fiore and Cameron utilized a unique camera referred to as a "simulcam," which recorded the live-action footage with virtual camera CGI footage in real-time. For his work on the film, Fiore won Best Cinematography at the Academy Awards.

Subsequent films Fiore has worked on include Real Steel (2011), Dark Phoenix (2019), Spider-Man: No Way Home (2021), A Good Person (2023), and The Killer (2024). In 2021, he shot his first film produced in his native Italy, Security.

Fiore is set to re-team with James Cameron for the fourth and fifth installments of the Avatar series, after being replaced by Russell Carpenter on the second and third films.

== Personal life ==
Fiore married Christine Vollmer in 2000. They have three children.

== Filmography ==
=== Feature film ===
| Year | Title | Director |
|---|---|---|
| 1986 | Automaton | David Bazant; Jeff Economy |
| 1995 | Dominion | Michael G. Kehoe |
| 1995 | Soldier Boyz | Louis Mourneau |
| 1996 | An Occasional Hell | Salomé Breziner |
| 1997 | Breaking Up | Robert Greenwald |
| 1998 | Love from Ground Zero | Stephen Grynberg |
| 2000 | Get Carter | Stephen Kay |
| 2000 | Lost Souls | Janusz Kamiński |
| 2001 | Driven | Renny Harlin |
| 2001 | The Center of the World | Wayne Wang |
| 2001 | Training Day | Antoine Fuqua |
| 2002 | Highway | James Cox |
| 2003 | Tears of the Sun | Antoine Fuqua |
| 2005 | The Island | Michael Bay |
| 2006 | Smokin' Aces | Joe Carnahan |
| 2007 | The Kingdom | Peter Berg |
| 2009 | Avatar | James Cameron |
| 2010 | The A-Team | Joe Carnahan |
| 2011 | Real Steel | Shawn Levy |
| 2013 | Runner Runner | Brad Furman |
| 2014 | The Equalizer | Antoine Fuqua |
| 2015 | Southpaw | Antoine Fuqua |
| 2016 | The Magnificent Seven | Antoine Fuqua |
| 2019 | Dark Phoenix | Simon Kinberg |
| 2019 | Mosul | Matthew Michael Carnahan |
| 2021 | Security | Peter Chelsom |
| 2021 | Infinite | Antoine Fuqua |
| 2021 | Spider-Man: No Way Home | Jon Watts |
| 2023 | A Good Person | Zach Braff |
| 2024 | Madame Web | S. J. Clarkson |
| 2024 | The Killer | John Woo |
| 2026 | Heart of the Beast | David Ayer |

Direct-to-video

| Year | Title | Director |
|---|---|---|
| 1998 | Billboard Dad | Alan Metter |

=== Television ===
| Year | Title | Director | Notes |
|---|---|---|---|
| 1997–98 | Tracey Takes On... | Don Scardino; Thomas Schlamme; Michael McKean; Michael Lange | 17 episodes |
| 2006 | Faceless | Joe Carnahan | TV movie |
| 2011 | Inside | D. J. Caruso | Social film |
| 2015 | Chris Tucker – Live | Phil Joanou | Stand-up special |

== Awards and nominations ==
| Year | Award | Category | Title | Result |
|---|---|---|---|---|
| 2009 | Academy Awards | Best Cinematography | Avatar | Won |
| 2009 | Critics' Choice Movie Awards | Best Cinematography | Avatar | Won |
| 2009 | Florida Film Critics Circle | Best Cinematography | Avatar | Won |
| 2009 | BAFTA Awards | Best Cinematography | Avatar | Nominated |
| 2009 | Chicago Film Critics Association | Best Cinematography | Avatar | Nominated |
| 2009 | Houston Film Critics Society | Best Cinematography | Avatar | Nominated |
| 2009 | New York Film Critics Circle | Best Cinematographer | Avatar | Nominated |
| 2009 | Online Film Critics Society | Best Cinematography | Avatar | Nominated |
| 2009 | American Society of Cinematographers | Outstanding Cinematography | Avatar | Nominated |
