= Piane Crati =

- Comune
- Comune di Piane Crati
- Coat of arms

- Location within Italy Location within Calabria
- Coordinates: 39°14′N 16°20′E
- Country: Italy
- Region: Calabria
- Province: Cosenza (CS)

Government
  - Mayor: Michele Ambroggio

Area
  - Total: 2 km^{2} (0.77 sq mi)
- Elevation: 620 m (2,030 ft)

Population (30 April 2012)
  - Total: 1,409
  - Density: 700/km^{2} (1,800/sq mi)
- Demonym: Pianoti
- Time zone: UTC+1 (CET)
  - Summer (DST): UTC+2 (CEST)
- Postal code: 87050
- Dialing code: 0984
- ISTAT code: 078097
- Patron saint: Saint Barbara
- Website: Official website

Piane Crati (Calabrian: Chiànë; Greek: Krathys) is a town and comune in the province of Cosenza in the Calabria region of southern Italy.

Located in the Crati river valley, 12 km from Cosenza, it is the smallest town in Calabria. The town was severely damaged in an earthquake on 27 March 1638.
