= San Pietro in Amantea =

- Comune
- Comune di San Pietro in Amantea
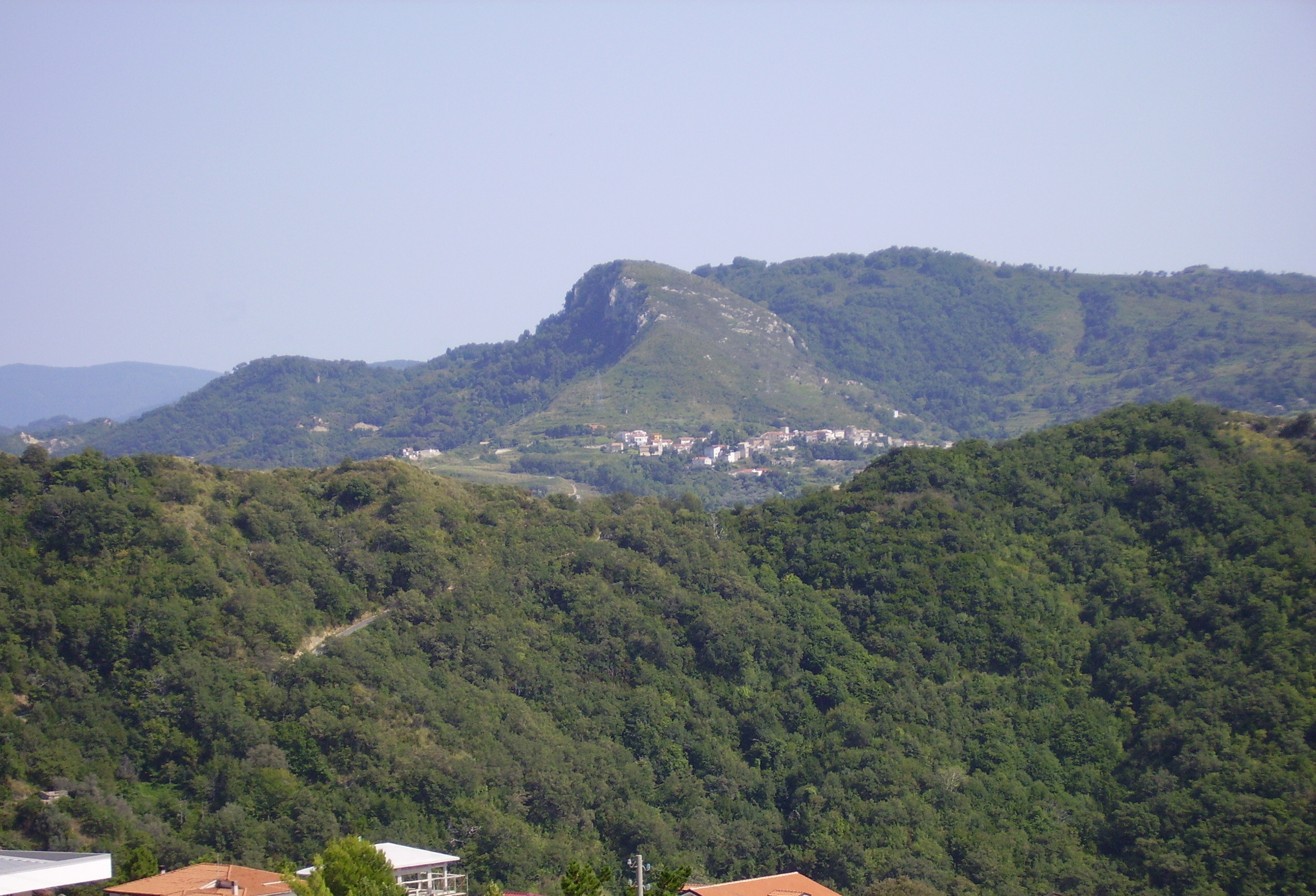

- Location within Italy Location within Calabria
- Coordinates: 39°8′N 16°7′E
- Country: Italy
- Region: Calabria
- Province: Cosenza (CS)
- Frazioni: Gallo, Giardini, Tuvulo

Government
  - Mayor: Gioacchino Torelli

Area
  - Total: 9.84 km^{2} (3.80 sq mi)
- Elevation: 374 m (1,227 ft)

Population (2018-01-01)
  - Total: 497
  - Density: 50.5/km^{2} (131/sq mi)
- Demonym: Sanpietresi
- Time zone: UTC+1 (CET)
  - Summer (DST): UTC+2 (CEST)
- Postal code: 87030
- Dialing code: 0982
- Website: Official website

San Pietro in Amantea is a village and comune in the province of Cosenza in the Calabria region of southern Italy.

== Geography ==
The town is bordered by Aiello Calabro, Amantea, Belmonte Calabro, Lago and Serra d'Aiello.
