= Cleto, Calabria =

Cleto Greek: Klèto
- Comune
- Comune di Cleto
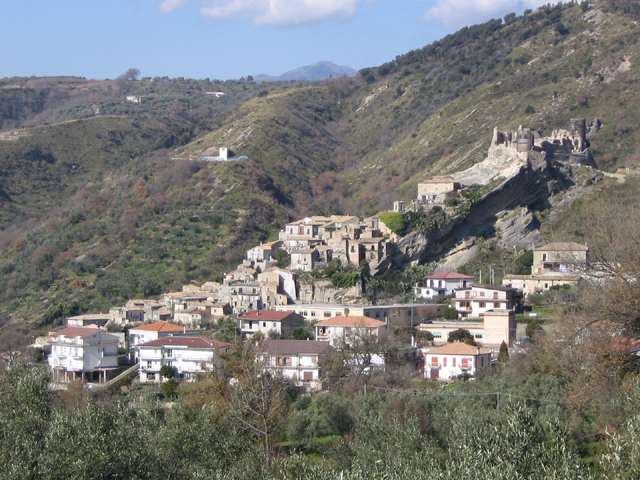

- Location within Italy Location within Calabria
- Coordinates: 39°5′N 16°10′E
- Country: Italy
- Region: Calabria
- Province: Cosenza (CS)
- Frazioni: Contrada Gioiosa, Contrada Passamorrone, Contrada Pianta, Contrada Vespano, Marina di Savuto, Savuto

Government
  - Mayor: Armando Bossio

Area
  - Total: 18.98 km^{2} (7.33 sq mi)
- Elevation: 250 m (820 ft)

Population (28 December 2017)
  - Total: 1,268
  - Density: 66.81/km^{2} (173.0/sq mi)
- Demonym: Cletesi
- Time zone: UTC+1 (CET)
  - Summer (DST): UTC+2 (CEST)
- Postal code: 87030
- Dialing code: 0982
- Patron saint: St. Anthony of Padua
- Saint day: 13 June
- Website: Official website

Cleto (Greek: Kleto, Klithos, local slang: Petramala, Pietramala) is a town and comune in the province of Cosenza in the Calabria region of southern Italy. It is located on the hills facing the Aeolian Islands, and the river Savuto.

The town is situated at an altitude of 200 meters above sea level at the feet of Mount St. Angelo, a few kilometers from the Tyrrhenian Sea and not far from the Lamezia Terme International Airport.

The hillside location means that the climate is very dry with hot summers and mild winters. The flora is typical of the Mediterranean area, with numerous olive trees and, in the area of the river Savuto, oranges and lemons. The oil production is one of the mainstays of the local economy, as well as tourism and agriculture in general. The mediterranean weather also allows to grow different vegetables and fruits like tomato, zucchini, eggplant, pear, peach, prickly pear cactus and potato. There are also many typical dishes and products. The fauna of the area includes a number of species of birds of prey, foxes, wild boar and, in the mountains, wolves.

== History ==
The town was known in Roman times as Sabutus, and was located not far from either the ancient cities of Terina or Temesa.

During the Norman rule it was known as Pietramala, becoming Cleto in 1862. In the Angevin period Petramala it was part of the Ajello county, together with other estates and castles.

== Main sights ==
The castle was built by the Normans at the top of Monte Sant'Angelo, overlooking the valley to the sea. It has two large towers of cylindrical shape, the first devoted to defense, guarding the drawbridge on the left. Inside was a large tank collected the rainwater that could be used to quench the thirst, while another tank was placed underground to house food reserves. The other tower was divided into two sections, one for the defense at the top, while the bottom one housed the baronial residence.

Other sights include the Consolation Church, built in the 17th century. It has a bell tower with a spire curved mantle of polychrome majolica (also from the 17th century) and Byzantine-style frescoed ceilings.

== People ==
- Bob Chiarelli, former mayor of Ottawa, is of Cletese heritage.
- Peter Chiarelli, current general manager of the Edmonton Oilers, is of Cletese heritage.

== See also ==
- Savuto river
