= Scigliano =

Town in Italy

- Comune
- Comune di Scigliano
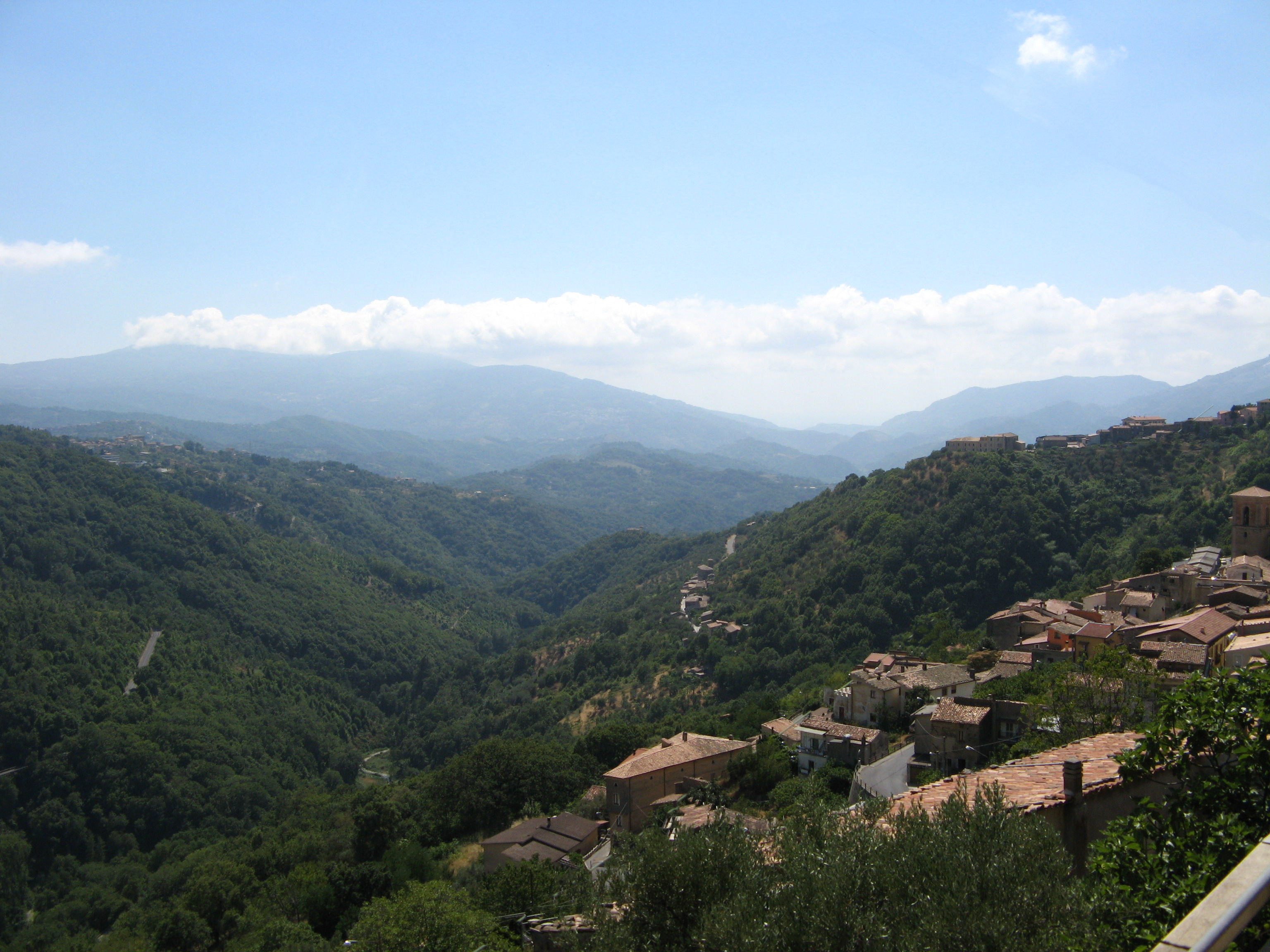
- Valle del Savuto, looking out over Scigliano

- Location within Italy Location within Calabria
- Coordinates: 39°07′43″N 16°18′27″E
- Country: Italy
- Region: Calabria
- Province: Cosenza (CS)
- Frazioni: Agrifoglio, Calvisi, Celsita, Cupani, Diano, Lupia, Petrisi, Serra, Traversa, Tasso

Government
  - Mayor: Raffaele Pane

Area
  - Total: 17 km^{2} (6.6 sq mi)
- Elevation: 659 m (2,162 ft)

Population (2007)
  - Total: 1,427
  - Density: 84/km^{2} (220/sq mi)
- Demonym: Sciglianesi
- Time zone: UTC+1 (CET)
  - Summer (DST): UTC+2 (CEST)
- Postal code: 87057
- Dialing code: 0984
- Patron saint: Saint Joseph
- Saint day: 19 March
- Website: Official website

Scigliano (Italian pronunciation: [ʃiʎˈʎaːno]) is a small town and comune (municipality) located in the hills in the province of Cosenza in the Calabria region of southern Italy. It is the birthplace of the 16th-century Italian humanist Giovanni Valentino Gentile.

== See also ==
- Savuto river
