= Parenti, Calabria =

Parenti
- Comune
- Comune di Parenti
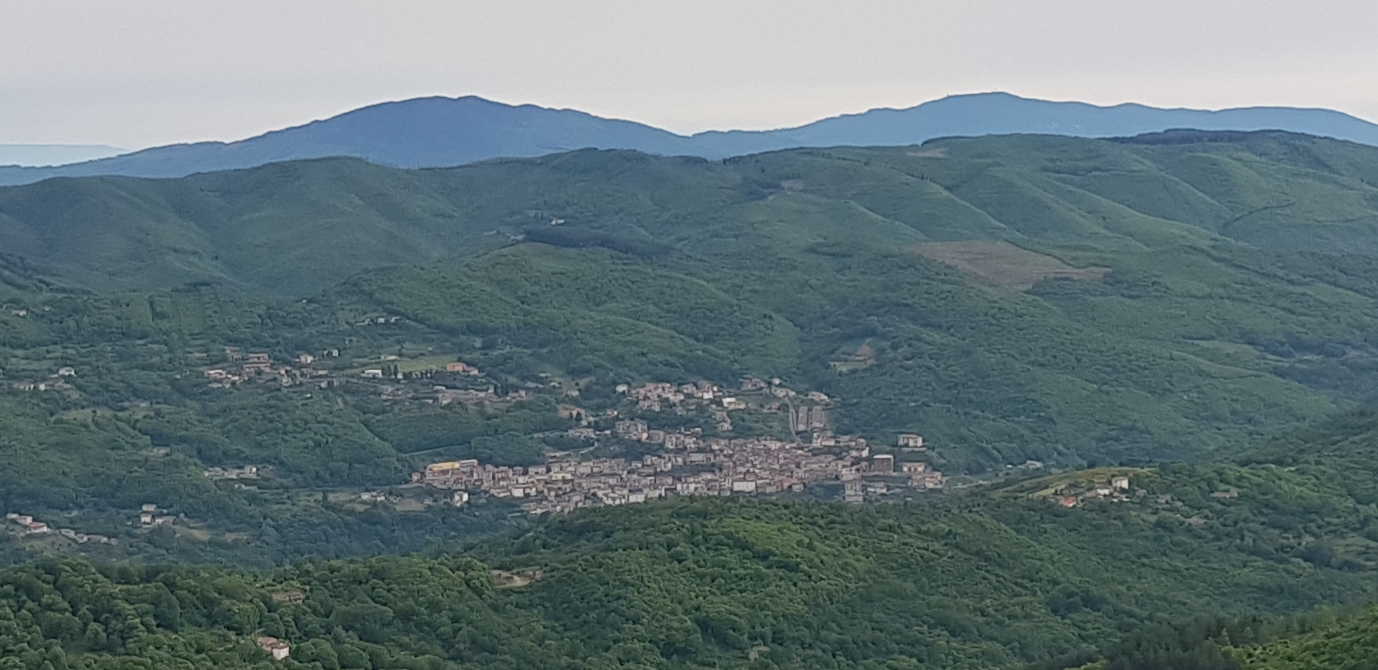

- Location within Italy Location within Calabria
- Coordinates: 39°9′45″N 16°24′40″E
- Country: Italy
- Region: Calabria
- Province: Cosenza (CS)

Government
  - Mayor: Donatella Deposito

Area
  - Total: 37.62 km^{2} (14.53 sq mi)
- Elevation: 798 m (2,618 ft)

Population (2018-01-01)
  - Total: 2,330
  - Density: 61.9/km^{2} (160/sq mi)
- Demonym: Parentèsi
- Time zone: UTC+1 (CET)
  - Summer (DST): UTC+2 (CEST)
- Postal code: 87040
- Dialing code: 0984
- Website: Official website

Parenti (Calabrian: Li Pariènti) is a town and comune of the province of Cosenza in the Calabria region of southern Italy. It is a small agricultural center of about 2,000 people on the Valley of the Savuto River. It is situated in vegetation of chestnut trees and oaks, and on the feet of the Brutto mount and on the left of the Savuto.

== See also ==
- Savuto
