= Savuto =

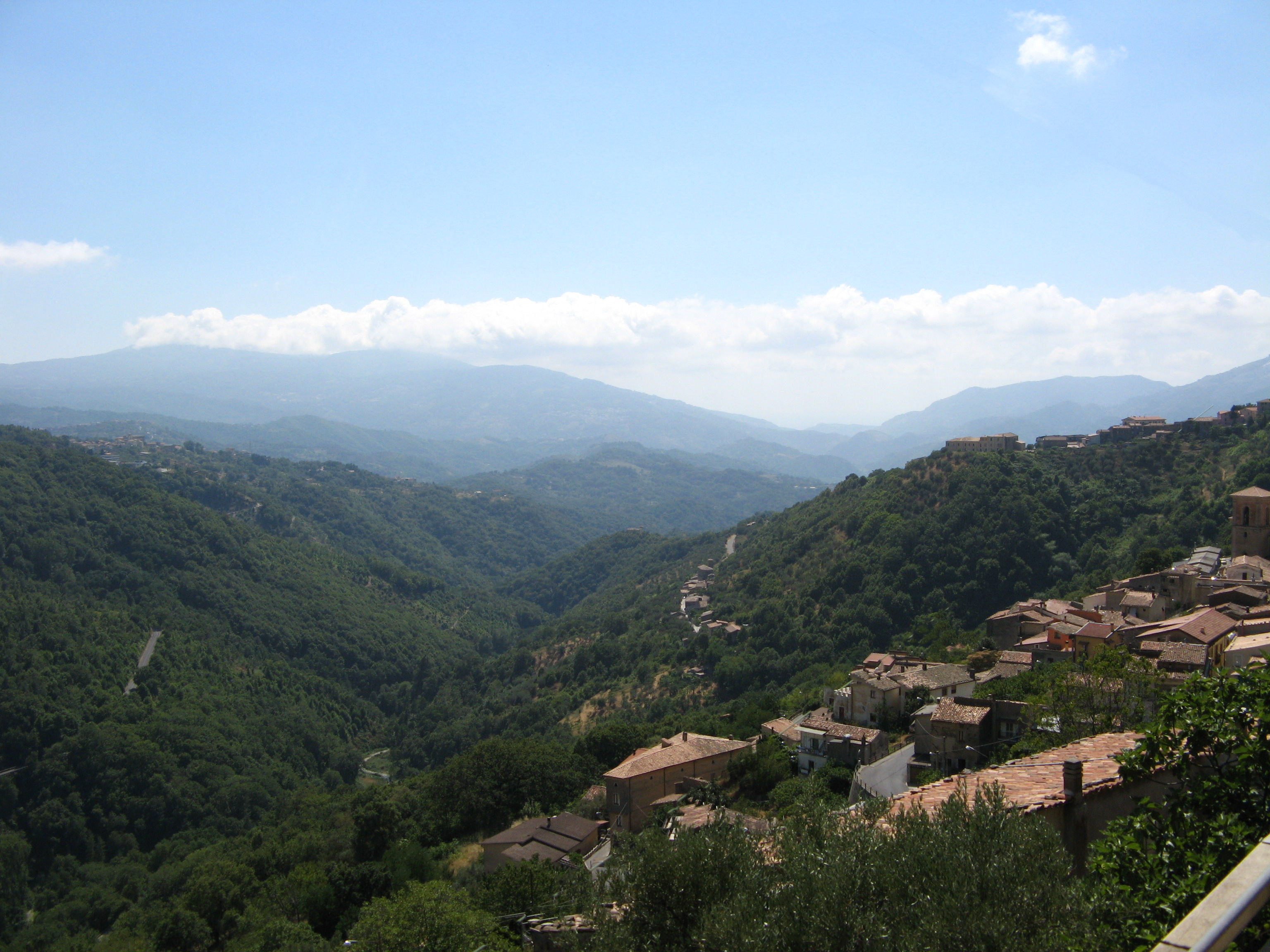
- Savuto river valley as seen from Scigliano

Location
- Country: Italy

Physical characteristics
- Mouth: Tyrrhenian Sea
  - coordinates: 39.0319°N 16.0989°E

The Savuto is a river and valley in Calabria, Southern Italy, that lies at the intersection of the provinces of Cosenza and Catanzaro. It is also the name of a DOC wine produced in the region.

The river's source is in La Sila and it empties into the Tyrrhenian Sea, at the Gulf of Saint Euphemia, after a run of 48 kilometres (30 mi).

The name originates from the Latin Sabutus, and it may also correspond to the Greek Ocinaros ("that flows quickly"), on which there was located the ancient town of Temesa.

It is also the name of a small village near the river

The river is crossed by a Roman bridge along the Roman Via Popilia, the Ponte sul Savuto, or Hannibal's bridge.

The Savuto valley is home to many towns (It: comuni including: Aprigliano, Parenti, Rogliano, Santo Stefano di Rogliano, Marzi, Carpanzano, Malito, Scigliano, Pedivigliano, Altilia, Grimaldi, Aiello Calabro, Martirano, San Mango d'Aquino, Cleto, and Nocera Terinese known collectively as "towns of the Savuto" (It: Paesi del Savuto).
