= Nocera Terinese =

- Comune
- Comune di Nocera Terinese
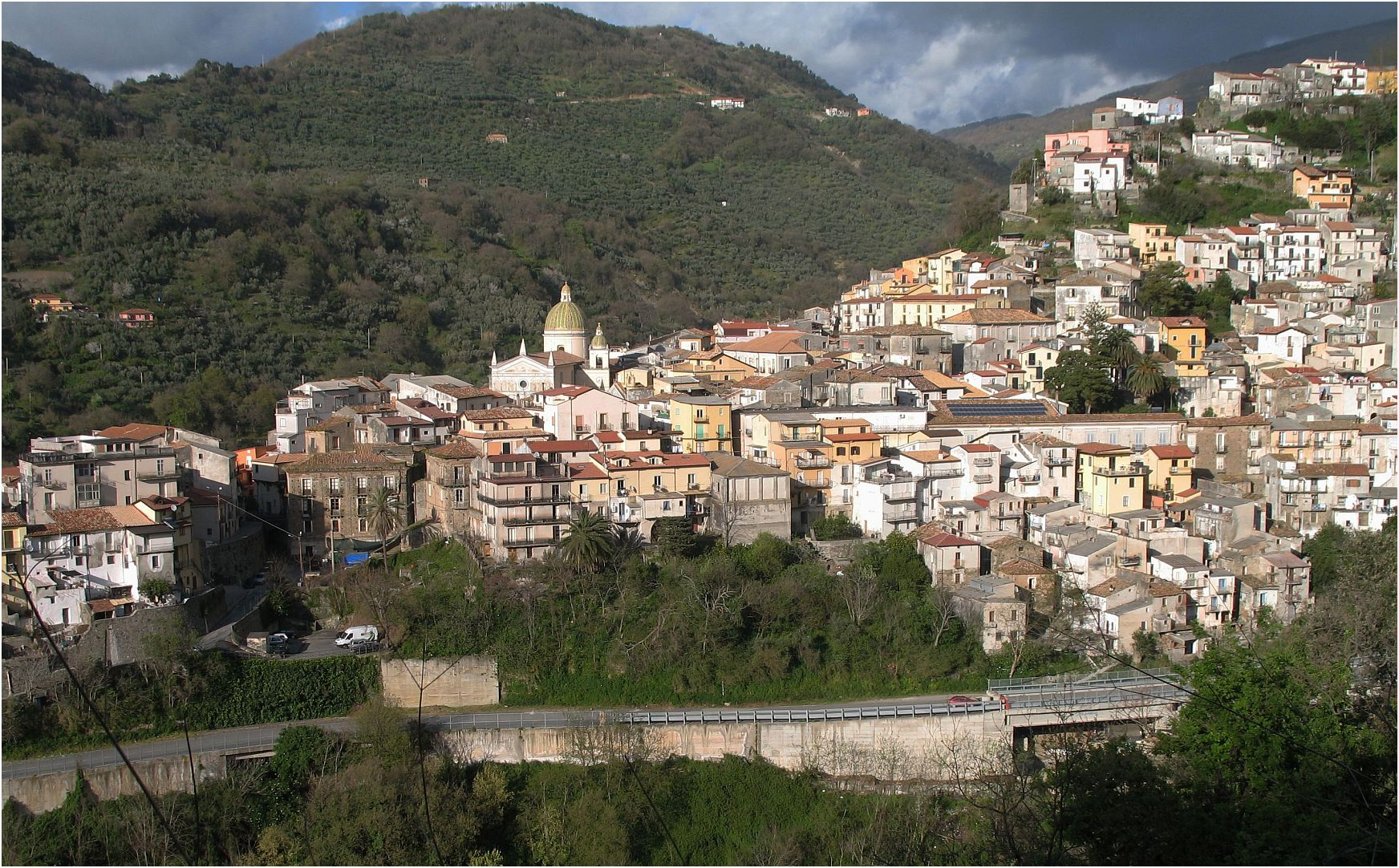

- Location within Italy Location within Calabria
- Coordinates: 39°2′10″N 16°9′45″E
- Country: Italy
- Region: Calabria
- Province: Catanzaro (CZ)

Government
  - Mayor: Antonio Albi

Area
  - Total: 46.2 km^{2} (17.8 sq mi)
- Elevation: 240 m (790 ft)

Population (31 December 2013)
  - Total: 4,753
  - Density: 103/km^{2} (266/sq mi)
- Demonym: Noceresi
- Time zone: UTC+1 (CET)
  - Summer (DST): UTC+2 (CEST)
- Postal code: 88047
- Dialing code: 0968
- Patron saint: St. John the Baptist
- Saint day: 24 June
- Website: Official website

Nocera Terinese is a town and comune of the province of Catanzaro in the Calabria region of southern Italy.

In its territory, according to the last archaeological investigations, was located the ancient Greater Greece city of Terina.

== See also ==
- Savuto river
