= Aprigliano =

- Comune
- Comune di Aprigliano
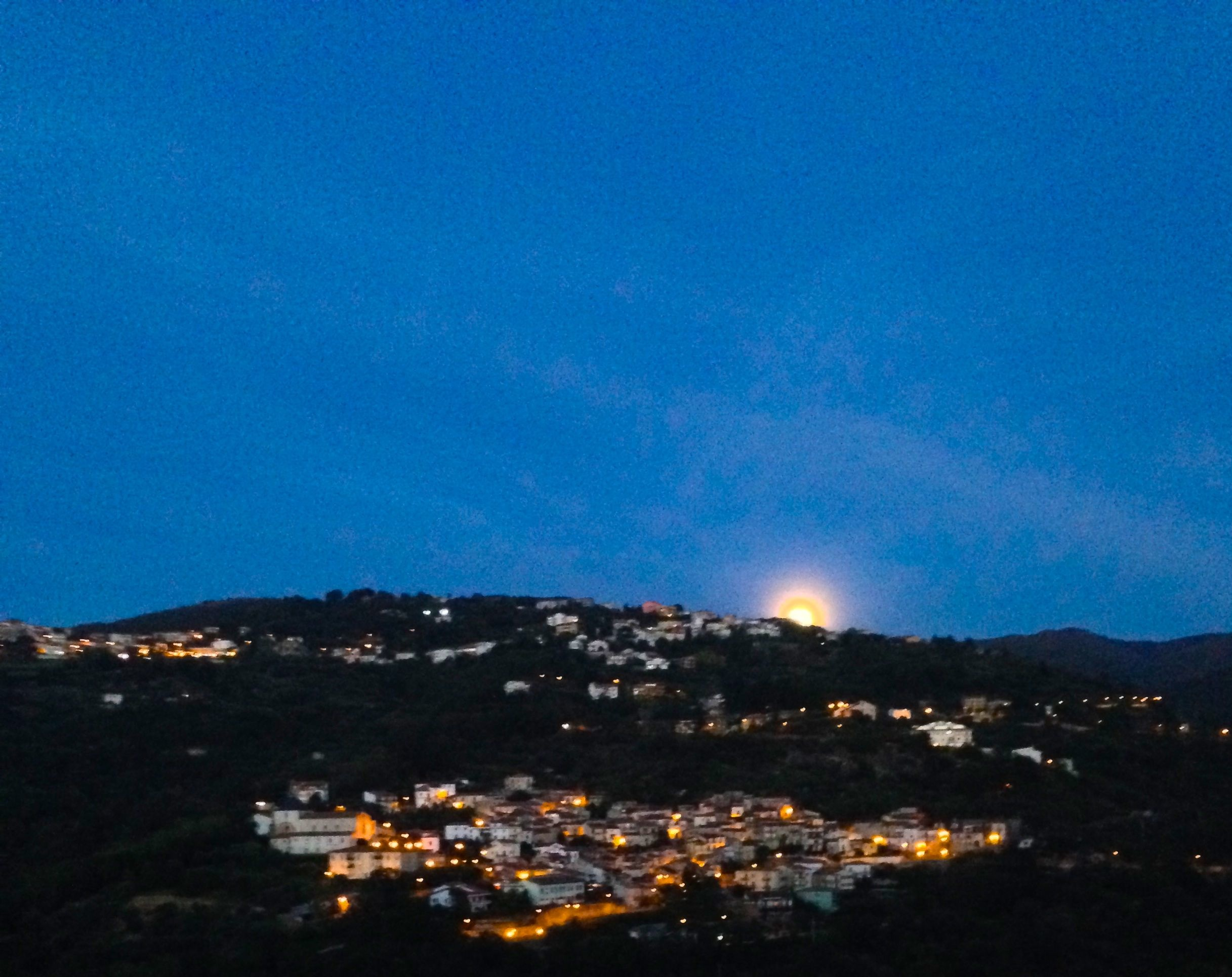

- Coat of arms

- Location of Aprigliano in Italy Aprigliano (Calabria)
- Coordinates: 39°14′N 16°21′E
- Country: Italy
- Region: Calabria
- Province: Cosenza (CS)
- Frazioni: Agosto, Corte, Grupa, Guarno, Petrone, San Nicola, Santo Stefano, Vico

Government
  - Mayor: Alessandro Leonardo Porco

Area
  - Total: 122.43 km^{2} (47.27 sq mi)
- Elevation: 725 m (2,379 ft)

Population (30 April 2017)
  - Total: 2,831
  - Density: 23.12/km^{2} (59.89/sq mi)
- Demonym: Apriglianesi
- Time zone: UTC+1 (CET)
  - Summer (DST): UTC+2 (CEST)
- Postal code: 87051
- Dialing code: 0984
- Patron saint: St. Roch
- Saint day: 16 August
- Website: Official website

Aprigliano is a town and comune in the province of Cosenza in the Calabria region of southern Italy. It is located on the road from the Tyrrhenian Sea to the Lago Arvo, some 15 km from Cosenza.

== Notable people ==
Cara DeVito (born 1951) is an American video producer, journalist was born here.

== See also ==
- Savuto river
