= Pedivigliano =

- Comune
- Comune di Pedivigliano
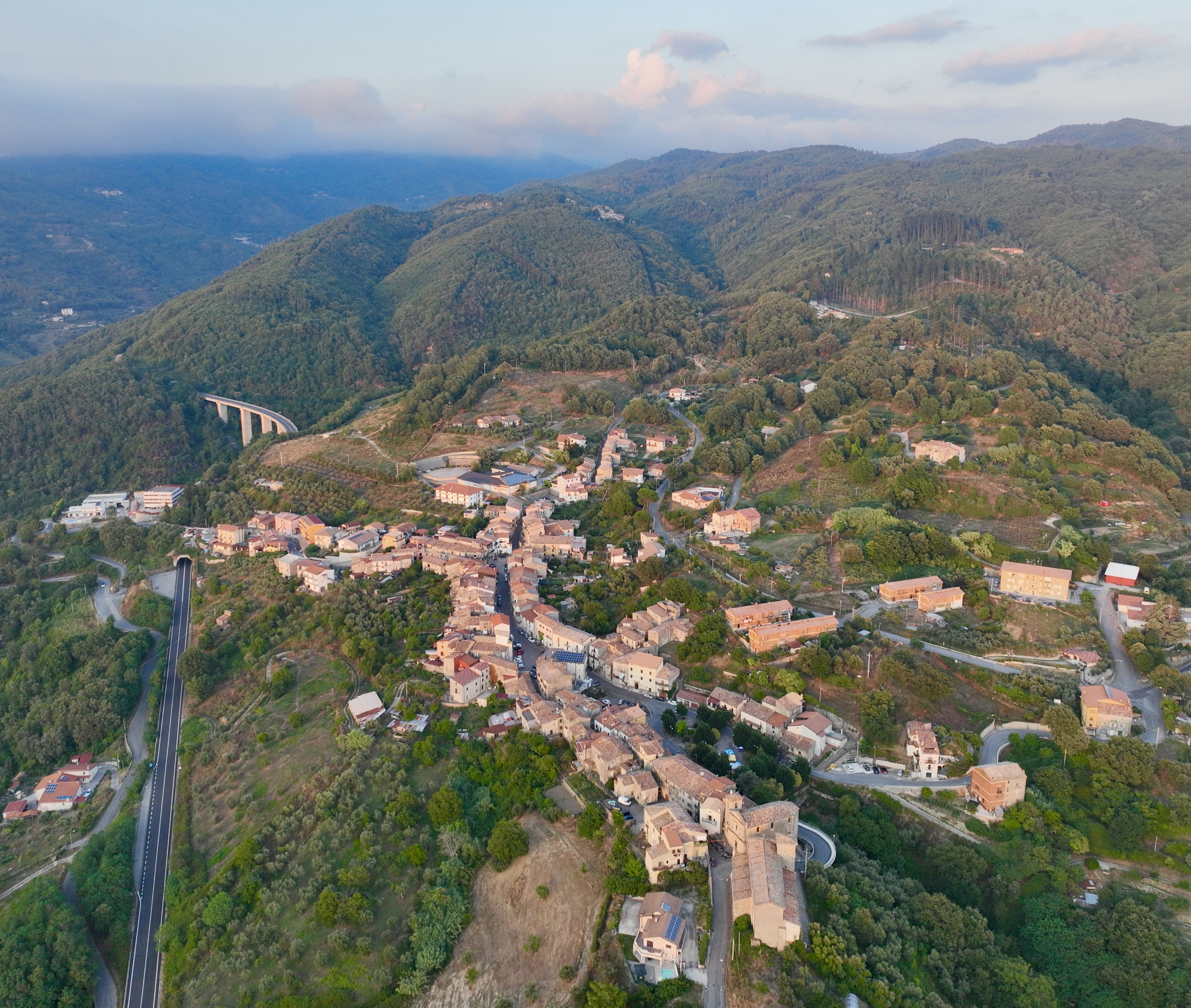
- Aerial view of Pedivigliano

- Location within Italy Location within Calabria
- Coordinates: 39°19′N 16°20′E
- Country: Italy
- Region: Calabria
- Province: Cosenza (CS)
- Frazioni: Borboruso, Villanova, Pittarella

Government
  - Mayor: Antonella Leone

Area
  - Total: 16.65 km^{2} (6.43 sq mi)
- Elevation: 576 m (1,890 ft)

Population (2007)
  - Total: 915
  - Density: 55.0/km^{2} (142/sq mi)
- Demonym: Pediviglianesi
- Time zone: UTC+1 (CET)
  - Summer (DST): UTC+2 (CEST)
- Postal code: 87050
- Dialing code: 0984
- Website: Official website

Pedivigliano is a town and comune in the province of Cosenza in the Calabria region of southern Italy.

== See also ==
- Savuto river
