= Cellara =

Cellara Greek: Kéllaros
- Comune
- Comune di Cellara
- Location within Italy Location within Calabria
- Coordinates: 39°13′N 16°20′E
- Country: Italy
- Region: Calabria
- Province: Cosenza (CS)
- Frazioni: I Purcili, I Scigazzi, La Piticchia, Riposo, San Domenico, San Vito

Government
  - Mayor: Vincenzo Conte

Area
  - Total: 5.86 km^{2} (2.26 sq mi)
- Elevation: 750 m (2,460 ft)

Population (2007)
  - Total: 514
  - Density: 87.7/km^{2} (227/sq mi)
- Demonym: Cellaresi
- Time zone: UTC+1 (CET)
  - Summer (DST): UTC+2 (CEST)
- Postal code: 87050
- Dialing code: 0984
- Patron saint: St. Sebastian
- Saint day: 21 August
- Website: Official website

Cellara (Greek: Kellaros) is a town and comune in the province of Cosenza in the Calabria region of southern Italy.
