= Belsito =

- Comune
- Comune di Belsito
- Location within Italy Location within Calabria
- Coordinates: 39°11′N 16°3′E
- Country: Italy
- Region: Calabria
- Province: Cosenza (CS)

Government
  - Mayor: Antonio Giuseppe Basile

Area
  - Total: 11.55 km^{2} (4.46 sq mi)
- Elevation: 663 m (2,175 ft)

Population (30 April 2017)
  - Total: 928
  - Density: 80.3/km^{2} (208/sq mi)
- Demonym: Belsitesi
- Time zone: UTC+1 (CET)
  - Summer (DST): UTC+2 (CEST)
- Postal code: 87030
- Dialing code: 0984
- Website: Official website

Belsito is a town and comune in the province of Cosenza in the Calabria region of southern Italy.
