= Domanico =

- Comune
- Comune di Domanico
- Location within Italy Location within Calabria
- Coordinates: 39°13′N 16°12′E
- Country: Italy
- Region: Calabria
- Province: Cosenza (CS)

Government
  - Mayor: Gianfranco Segreti Bruno

Area
  - Total: 23.66 km^{2} (9.14 sq mi)
- Elevation: 730 m (2,400 ft)

Population (30 April 2017)
  - Total: 933
  - Density: 39.4/km^{2} (102/sq mi)
- Demonym: Domanichesi
- Time zone: UTC+1 (CET)
  - Summer (DST): UTC+2 (CEST)
- Postal code: 87030
- Dialing code: 0984
- ISTAT code: 078050
- Patron saint: San Giovanni Battista
- Saint day: 24 June
- Website: Official website

Domanico is a town and comune in the province of Cosenza in the Calabria region of southern Italy.
