= Carpanzano =

- Comune
- Comune di Carpanzano
- Location within Italy Location within Calabria
- Coordinates: 39°9′N 16°18′E
- Country: Italy
- Region: Calabria
- Province: Cosenza (CS)

Government
  - Mayor: Giuseppe Vigliaturo

Area
  - Total: 14.27 km^{2} (5.51 sq mi)
- Elevation: 600 m (2,000 ft)

Population (30 April 2017)
  - Total: 244
  - Density: 17.1/km^{2} (44.3/sq mi)
- Demonym: Carpanzanesi
- Time zone: UTC+1 (CET)
  - Summer (DST): UTC+2 (CEST)
- Postal code: 87050
- Dialing code: 0984
- ISTAT code: 078027
- Patron saint: SS Madonna delle Grazie
- Saint day: Fourth Sunday in September
- Website: Official website

Carpanzano is a town and comune in the province of Cosenza in the Calabria region of southern Italy.

== See also ==
- Savuto river
