= Altilia =

- Comune
- Comune di Altilia
- Location within Italy Location within Calabria
- Coordinates: 39°8′N 16°15′E
- Country: Italy
- Region: Calabria
- Province: Cosenza (CS)
- Frazioni: Maione

Government
  - Mayor: Pasqualino De Rose (Lista Civica "Altilia nel cuore")

Area
  - Total: 10.70 km^{2} (4.13 sq mi)
- Elevation: 594 m (1,949 ft)

Population (2007)
  - Total: 779
  - Density: 72.8/km^{2} (189/sq mi)
- Demonym: Altiliesi
- Time zone: UTC+1 (CET)
  - Summer (DST): UTC+2 (CEST)
- Postal code: 87040
- Dialing code: 0984
- ISTAT code: 078008
- Patron saint: Santa Maria dell'Assunta
- Saint day: 20 January

Altilia (Calabrian: Atìlia) is a town and comune in the province of Cosenza in the Calabria region of southern Italy. The comune includes the frazione of Maione.

== See also ==
- Savuto river
