= Mangone =

- Comune
- Comune di Mangone
- Location within Italy Location within Calabria
- Coordinates: 39°12′N 16°20′E
- Country: Italy
- Region: Calabria
- Province: Cosenza (CS)

Government
  - Mayor: Orazio Berardi

Area
  - Total: 12.27 km^{2} (4.74 sq mi)
- Elevation: 805 m (2,641 ft)

Population (2018-01-01)
  - Total: 1,804
  - Density: 147.0/km^{2} (380.8/sq mi)
- Demonym: Mangonesi
- Time zone: UTC+1 (CET)
  - Summer (DST): UTC+2 (CEST)
- Postal code: 87050
- Dialing code: 0984
- Website: Official website

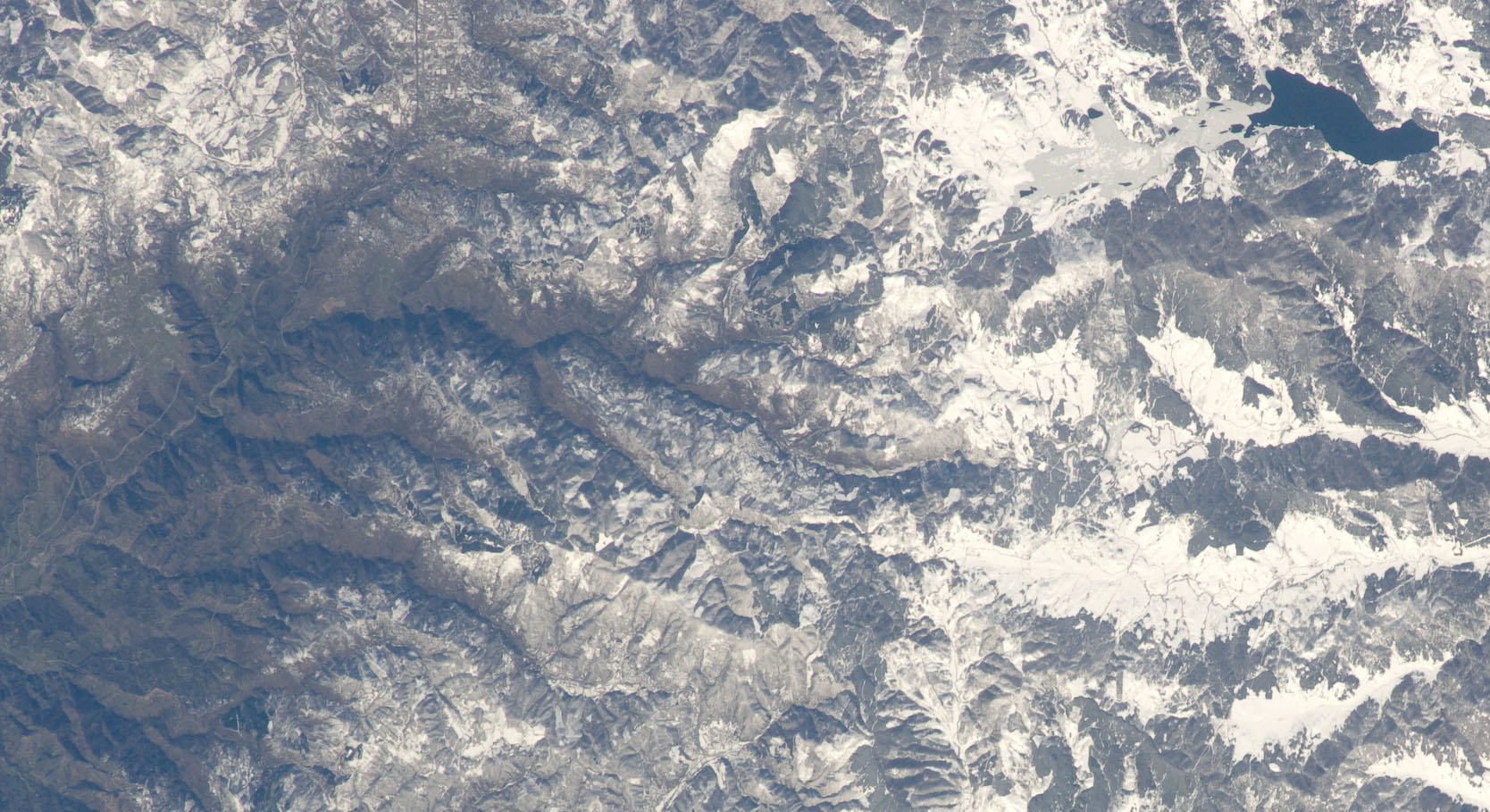
View of Italy taken during ISS Expedition 18.

Mangone (Calabrian: Mangùni) is in the province of Cosenza in the Calabria region of southern Italy.
