= Martirano =

- Comune
- Comune di Martirano
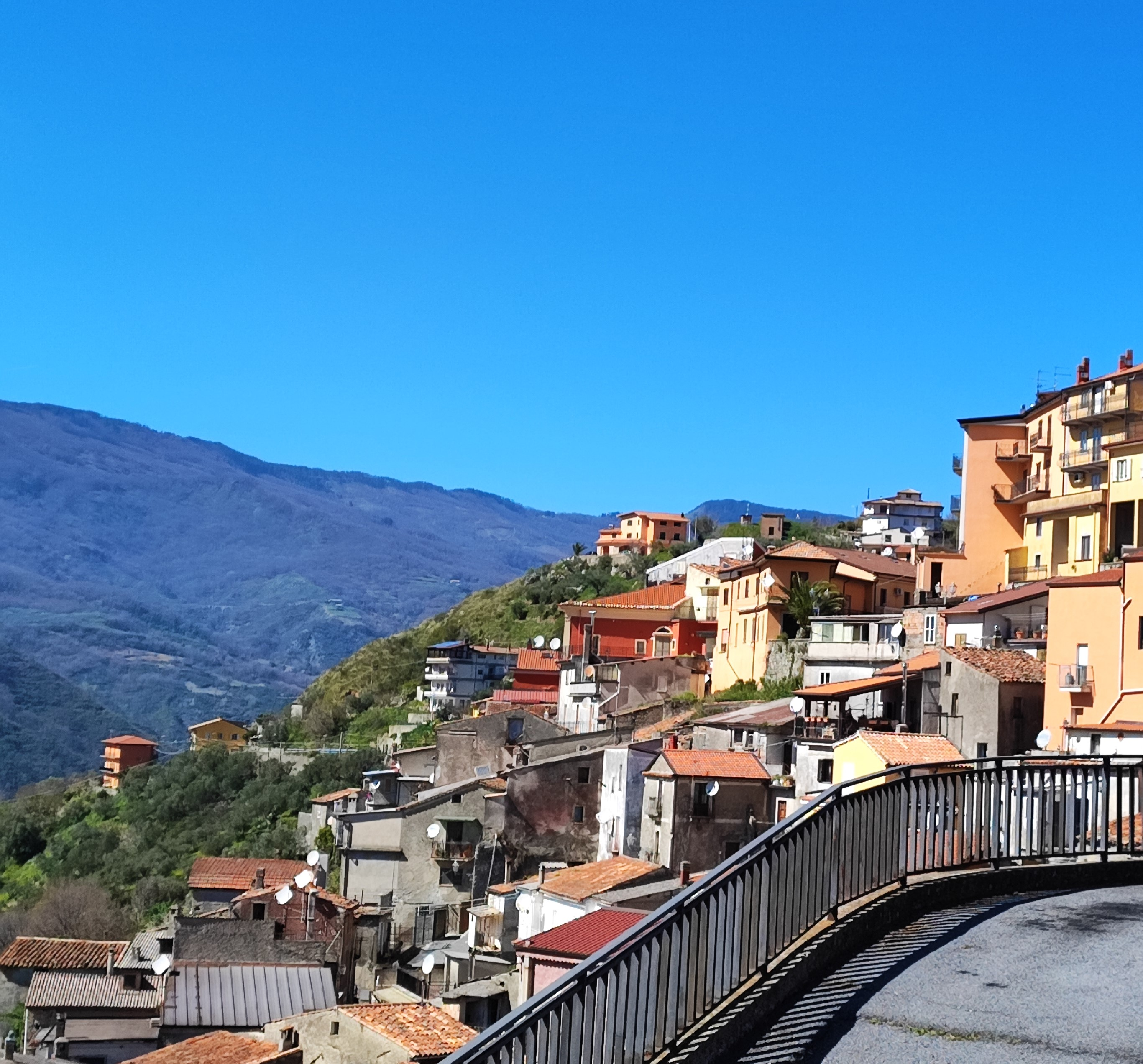

- Location within Italy Location within Calabria
- Coordinates: 39°04′54″N 16°14′54″E
- Country: Italy
- Region: Calabria
- Province: Catanzaro (CZ)
- Frazioni: San Fili, Muraglie, Persico

Area
  - Total: 14.57 km^{2} (5.63 sq mi)
- Elevation: 381 m (1,250 ft)

Population (2013)
  - Total: 917
  - Density: 62.9/km^{2} (163/sq mi)
- Demonym: Martiranesi
- Time zone: UTC+1 (CET)
  - Summer (DST): UTC+2 (CEST)
- Postal code: 88040
- Dialing code: 0968
- Patron saint: San Sebastiano
- Saint day: 20 January

Martirano is a village and comune of the province of Catanzaro in the Calabria region of Italy.

== History ==
Local historians believe that Martirano was built on the ruins of Mamertum, a city of the Roman Empire. Martirano, also known as Marturano, was seat of a bishop until 1818 when it became a titular bishopric.

Henry of Germany, eldest son of the Holy Roman Emperor Frederick II, died in Martirano in 1242.

== See also ==
- Savuto river
