= Rogliano =

- Comune
- Comune di Rogliano
- Location within Italy Location within Calabria
- Coordinates: 39°11′N 16°19′E
- Country: Italy
- Region: Calabria
- Province: Cosenza (CS)

Area
  - Total: 41 km^{2} (16 sq mi)
- Elevation: 660 m (2,170 ft)

Population (31 December 2004)
  - Total: 5,934
  - Density: 140/km^{2} (370/sq mi)
- Demonym: Roglianesi
- Time zone: UTC+1 (CET)
  - Summer (DST): UTC+2 (CEST)
- Postal code: 87054
- Dialing code: 0984
- Website: Official website

Rogliano is a town and comune in the province of Cosenza in the Calabria region of southern Italy. It's located in the Savuto Valley. It was mostly destroyed in a violent earthquake in 1638. The town is 19 kilometers (12 mi) from Cosenza.

== Monuments and places of interest ==
Among the tourist attractions is the historic center, formed by the Serra, Spani, Donnanni, Cuti and Forche districts.

Rogliano is also known for its churches. The Cathedral of Saints Peter and Paul was built in 1717, as evidenced by two papal bulls, dating back to 1748, in which the title of Deanery to St. Peter and Primiceriato of St. George was conferred. The main bell, recovered after the earthquake of 1638, dates back to 1333. Completely destroyed by the disastrous earthquake, the church was rebuilt within a few years. The "softened" perspective with elegant representations was completed in 1717 with all its columns in Doric, Ionian and Corinthian styles. The interior features a three-nave architecture in the Baroque style.

The church of Santa Maria alle Croci is located in the Cuti district and dates back to the end of the 16th century.

The church of Santi Domenico e Nicola dates back to the 17th century. The interior of the church has a single nave. The main altar painting is a mosaic reproduction by Sassoferrato and represents the Madonna and Child, San Domenico and Santa Rita.

The church of San Giorgio, located in the Donnanni district, dates back to the early years of the 1500s and is characterized by the Renaissance style. The construction was completed in 1544, after being located where another temple stood since 1181 in which the Madonna della Sanità was venerated.

The church of Sant'Ippolito was an ancient chapel built in 1638, dedicated to the Virgin of Health. The small chapel was enlarged between 1702 and 1707 and dedicated to Sant'Ippolito.

The small church of San Michele, dating back to the XVIII century and located in the Serra district, is an example of a rural church.

The church of the Madonna delle Grazie, or "Camina", was built in 1569. The finely worked ceiling in pure gold is of particular value.

The church dedicated to St. Joseph has a Greek Orthodox cross-architecture with an octagonal dome, now used as a museum of sacred art.

Further monuments of interest are the Palazzo Morelli, located at the end of Corso Umberto, which welcomed within its walls, among others, Ferdinand II of Bourbon, Giuseppe Garibaldi and the minister, in the early 1900s, Luigi Fera, native of nearby Cellara. Palazzo Ricciulli, located in the Spani district, welcomed Charles V, as evidenced by a marble plaque.

The Roglianesi's meeting point is Piazza San Domenico, overlooked by the eighteenth-century church of the same name, the town hall, formerly a Dominican convent, and the municipal villa.

== See also ==
- Savuto river
