= Malito =

Malito Greek: Melitos
- Comune
- Comune di Malito
- Location within Italy Location within Calabria
- Coordinates: 39°9′N 16°15′E
- Country: Italy
- Region: Calabria
- Province: Cosenza (CS)
- Frazioni: Jassa

Government
  - Mayor: Francesco Mario De Rosa

Area
  - Total: 16.92 km^{2} (6.53 sq mi)
- Elevation: 728 m (2,388 ft)

Population (30 April 2017)
  - Total: 764
  - Density: 45.2/km^{2} (117/sq mi)
- Demonym: Malitesi (local dialect: Malitani)
- Time zone: UTC+1 (CET)
  - Summer (DST): UTC+2 (CEST)
- Postal code: 87030
- Dialing code: 0984
- Patron saint: St. Elijah the Prophet
- Saint day: Fourth Saturday in May
- Website: Official website

Malito (Greek: Melitos) is a town and comune in the province of Cosenza in the Calabria region of southern Italy.

== See also ==
- Savuto river
