= Marzi, Calabria =

Marzi
- Comune
- Comune di Marzi
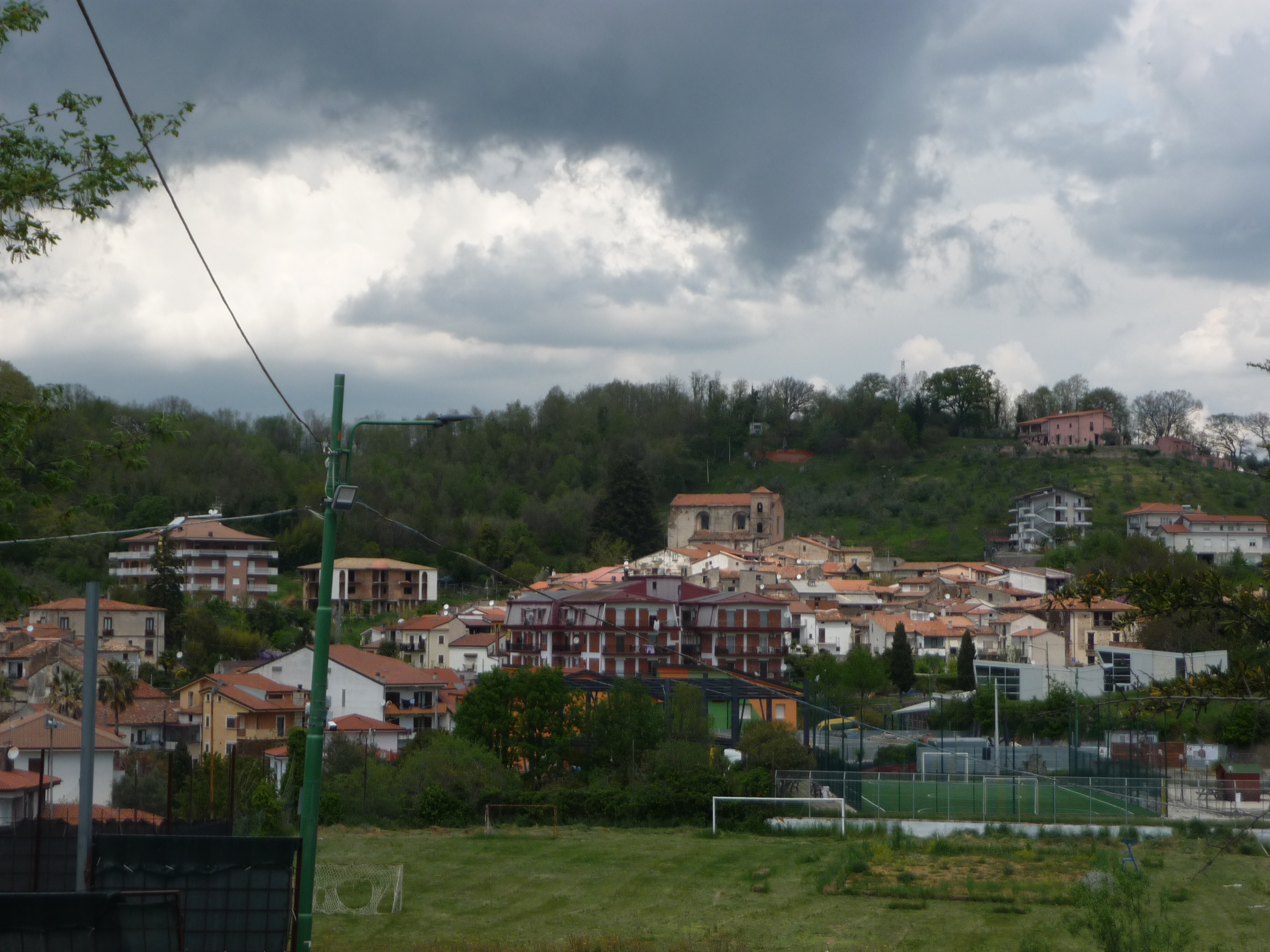
- View of Marzi

- Location within Italy Location within Calabria
- Coordinates: 39°10′N 16°18′E
- Country: Italy
- Region: Calabria
- Province: Cosenza (CS)

Government
  - Mayor: Pietro Tucci

Area
  - Total: 15 km^{2} (5.8 sq mi)
- Elevation: 530 m (1,740 ft)

Population (2007)
  - Total: 983
  - Density: 66/km^{2} (170/sq mi)
- Demonym: Marzesi
- Time zone: UTC+1 (CET)
  - Summer (DST): UTC+2 (CEST)
- Postal code: 87050
- Dialing code: 0984
- Patron saint: Saint Barbara
- Saint day: 4 December
- Website: Official website

Marzi is a town and comune in the province of Cosenza in the Calabria region of southern Italy.

== Notable people ==
- Mauro Fiore, Italian-American cinematographer
- Christine Tucci, American actress and sister of Stanley Tucci, has her origins in Marzi
- Stanley Tucci, American actor and filmmaker, has his origins in Marzi

== See also ==
- Savuto river
