= Aiello Calabro =

- Comune
- Comune di Aiello Calabro
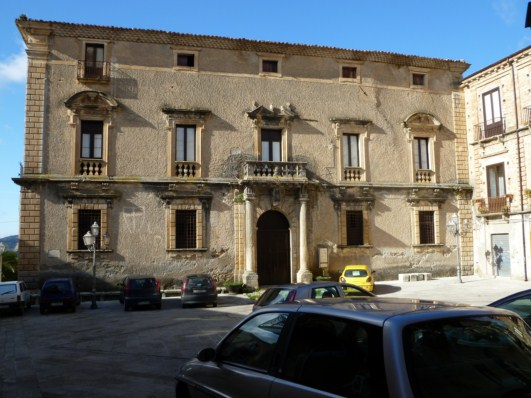
- A historical monument

- Location within Italy Location within Calabria
- Coordinates: 39°7′N 16°10′E
- Country: Italy
- Region: Calabria
- Province: Cosenza (CS)
- Frazioni: Stragolera, Cannavali, Giani, Santa Caterina, Campo, Patricello, Acquafredda, Macchia, Alzinetta, Fargani, Borgile, Romia, Passamorrone, Buda, Castagniti, Serra Pilata, Coschi, Tavolone, Bocca Ceraso, Campagna, Calendola, Persico, Pondurale, Copano, Cotura, Tardo, Valle Oscura, Guarno, San Martino, Cappellano, Accroce.

Government
  - Mayor: Luca LEPORE

Area
  - Total: 38.51 km^{2} (14.87 sq mi)
- Elevation: 502 m (1,647 ft)

Population (31 December 2018)
  - Total: 1,634
  - Density: 42.43/km^{2} (109.9/sq mi)
- Demonym: Aiellesi
- Time zone: UTC+1 (CET)
  - Summer (DST): UTC+2 (CEST)
- Postal code: 87031
- Dialing code: 0982
- Patron saint: San Geniale martire
- Website: Official website

Aiello Calabro is a town and comune in the province of Cosenza in the Calabria region of southern Italy.

== See also ==
- Savuto river
- 1905 Calabria earthquake
