= Siege of Amantea =

Siege during the War of the Third Coalition

- Part of the Calabrian Insurrection during War of the Third Coalition
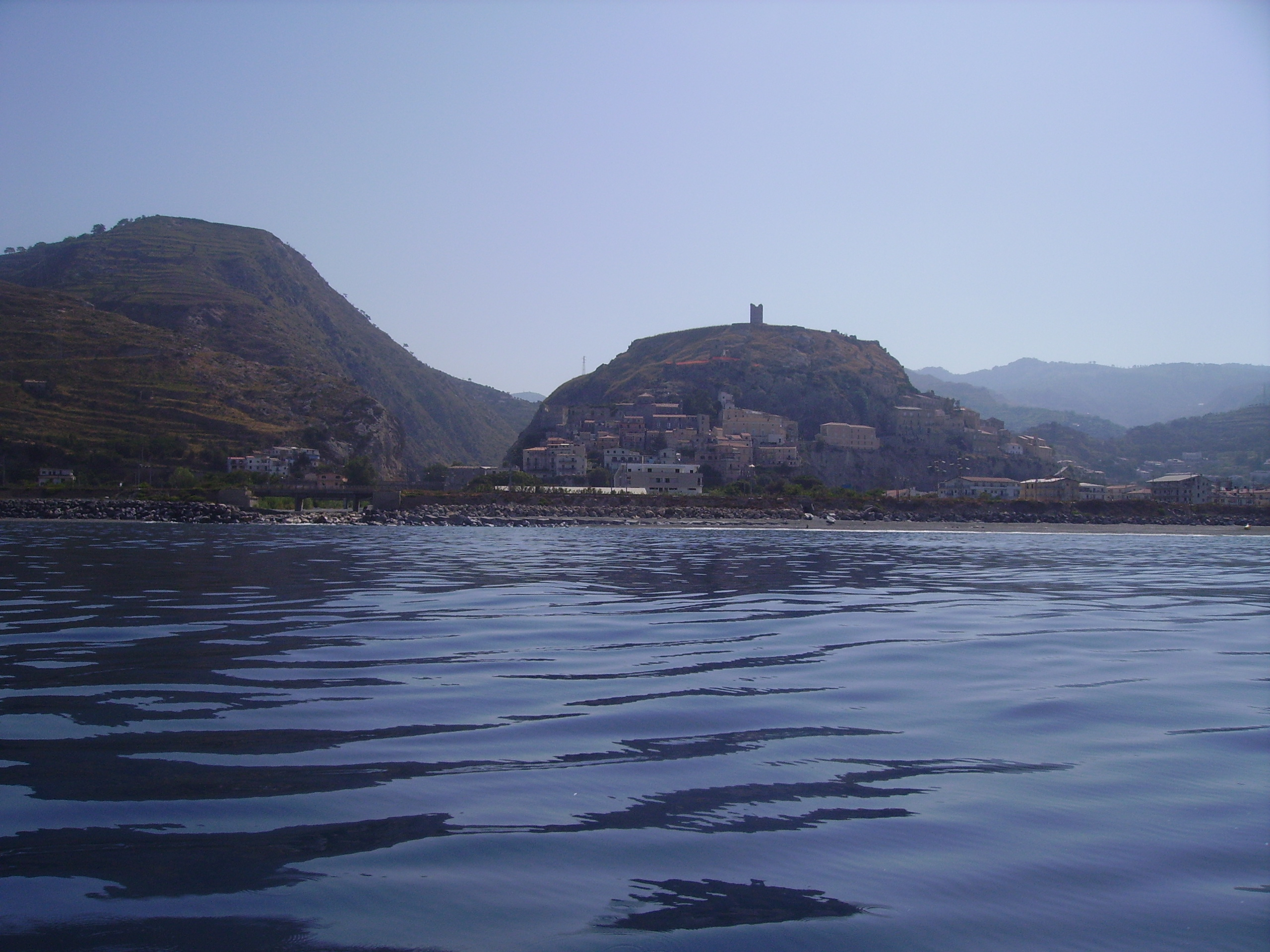
- Amantea as seen from the sea. On the left, the strategic high ground of Camolo.
Date	December 1806 – January 1807
Location	Amantea, Calabria, Italy 39°7′59.16″N 16°4′23.33″E
Result	French victory: Calabrian insurrection suppressed

Belligerents
Kingdom of Naples • Calabrian insurgents United Kingdom; Kingdom of Sicily	First French Empire

Commanders and leaders
(Kingdom of Naples) Giovanni Micheli (Kingdom of Naples) Ridolfo Mirabelli (Kingdom of Naples) Alessandro Mandarini; Sidney Smith (Kingdom of Sicily) Fra Diavolo	André Masséna; Jean-Antoine Verdier; Guillaume Philibert Duhesme; Jean Reynier
- Location within Calabria

The siege of Amantea was a military operation that was part of the Calabrian Insurrection, an episode of the War of the Third Coalition.

The decisive siege lasted about forty days, from December 29, 1806, to February 7, 1807; however, throughout 1806 there were hostilities between the French Army and the Bourbon resistance supported by the United Kingdom.

== Background ==
The Bourbons of Naples entered the Third Coalition against Napoleon Bonaparte on April 11, 1805: the latter defeated the coalesced armies at the Battle of Austerlitz (December 2, 1805), and took the pretext for the invasion of Bourbon territories. Six years after the brief interlude of the Neapolitan Republic of 1799, the French army returned to conquer Southern Italy.

On February 15, 1806, the French entered Naples, and Napoleon's brother Joseph Bonaparte was proclaimed King of Naples. King Ferdinand IV of Naples took refuge in Palermo, where with the help of the British he directed the Bourbon guerrilla resistance on the mainland.

In Calabria in particular, several active hotbeds of resistance against the French occupation stood out, as had happened six years earlier.

== The French occupation of Amantea and the Anglo-Bourbon landing ==
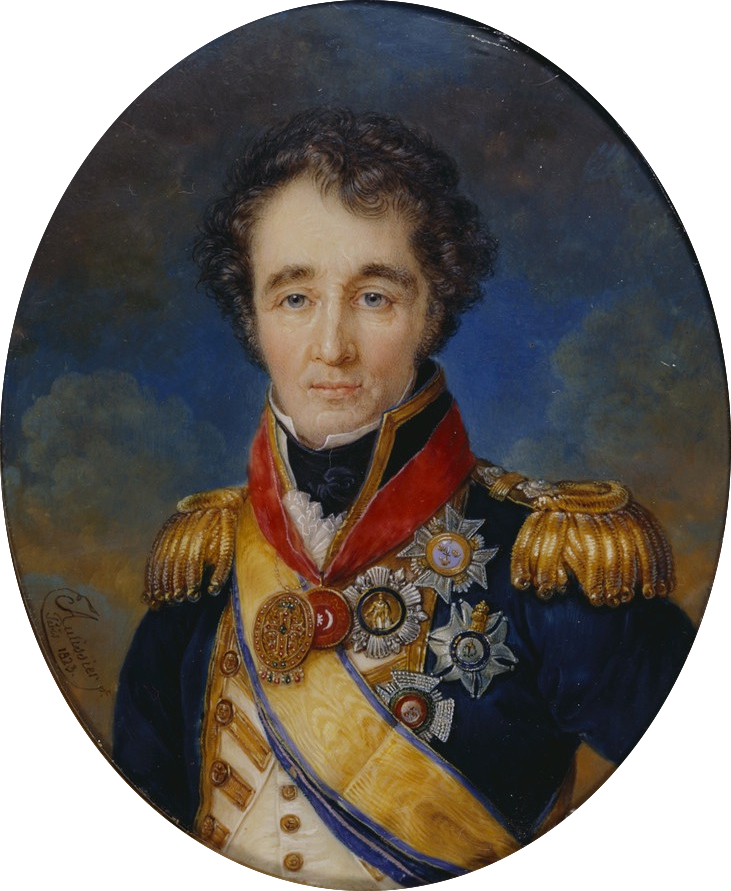
Sir William Sidney Smith (1764–1840), British admiral stationed in Tyrrhenian waters during the siege of Amantea.

In March 30,000 French soldiers led by generals Guillaume Philibert Duhesme and Jean Reynier disembarked in Calabria.

Amantea was occupied without resistance on March 12, 1806, by a detachment of Polish vaulters on foot. The commanding officer, castellan Angelo Maria Abate Biondi of Serra d'Aiello, had fled. Some citizens were imprisoned on charges of being pro-Bourbon, often on accusations motivated by personal grudges; on May 21, 1806, a 47-year-old Amantea resident, Alessandro Mirabelli, was shot on charges of resisting the French occupation.

On July 4, the French were defeated by Anglo-Bourbon forces at the Battle of Maida, fought not far from Amantea on the plain of Sant'Eufemia. An Anglo-Sicilian fleet commanded by British Admiral William Sidney Smith and consisting of one vessel, two frigates, two brigantines and ten launches deployed in a fighting position in the waters in front of Amantea. The French garrison abandoned the town to fall back toward Cosenza along the Lago road, taking with them some political prisoners: the column was attacked by some Amantean Bourbonists near the suburb of Taverna, and then by other armed groups along the road near San Pietro, Terrati and Lago, so that the Napoleonic forces were forced to release the prisoners.

The Amantean Bourbonists signaled to the Anglo-Bourbon fleet that the French had withdrawn: the fleet landed 100 British soldiers, led by General Coll, on the beach at Amantea, and bands of Bourbonists led by Necco from Scalea and Michele Pezza from Itri, better known as "Fra Diavolo." Admiral Smith appointed Ridolfo Mirabelli as castellan, who immediately had to face reprisals by the Bourbonists who had been arrested by the French to the detriment of citizens considered pro-French: some citizens were sheltered in English ships to avoid reprisals from their political opponents. This did not avoid numerous, sometimes heinous, crimes that took place in Amantea and neighboring towns.

In the meantime, while the chieftains dispersed to control the surrounding towns (under the command of the Head of the Province, Giovanni Battista De Micheli from Longobardi) and to repair the town walls and defenses, the English garrison that guarded the town during the day returned to the ships each night, fearing ambushes.

== French raids in the summer-autumn of 1806 ==
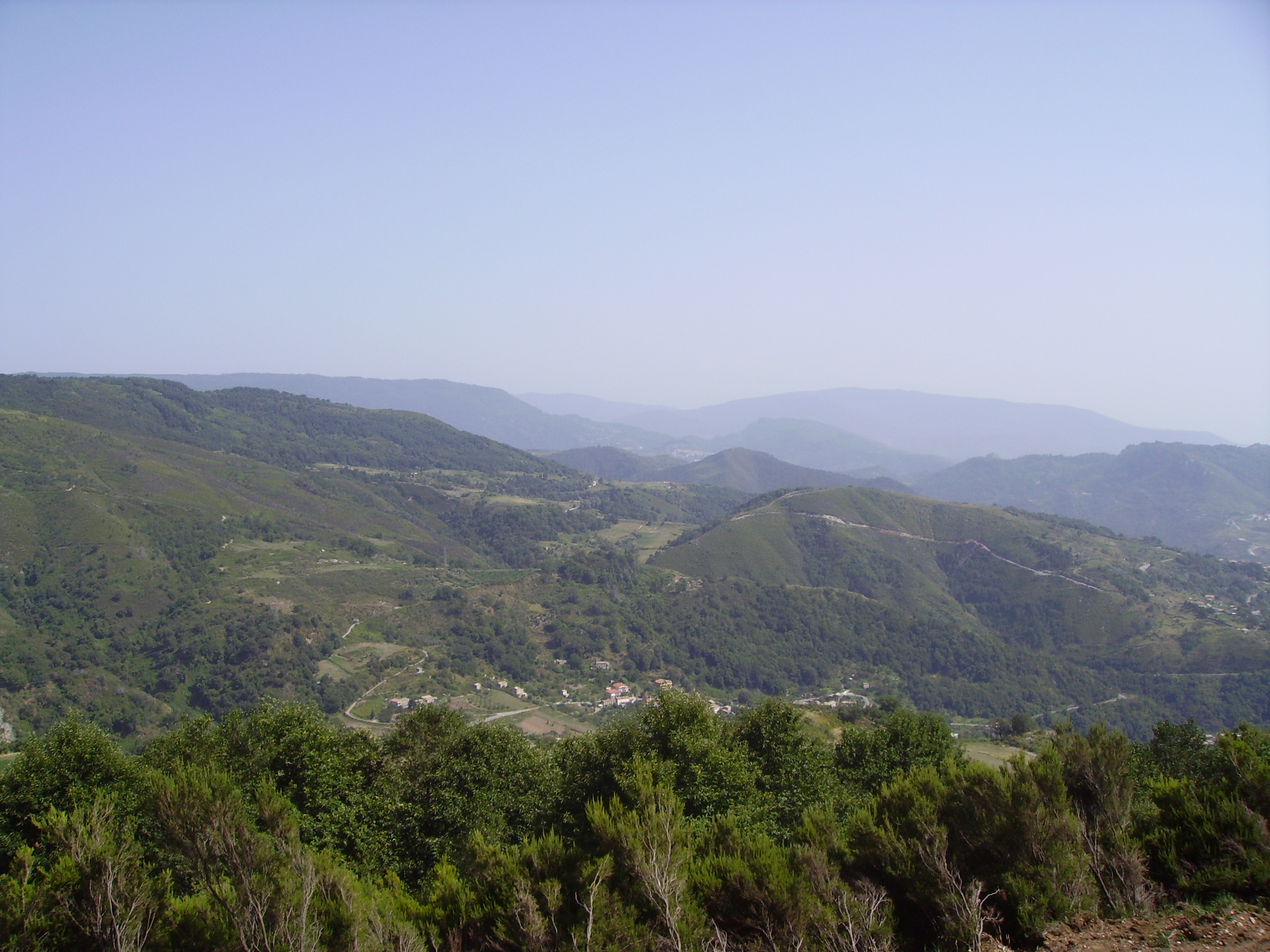
The heights surrounding the Vadi Pass as seen from the slopes of Mount Cocuzzo. The French had to move through this treacherous and unknown to them terrain.

On July 5, General Jean Antoine Verdier (accompanied by a number of pro-French Amantean fugitives, including Lieutenant Colonel Luigi Amato and Captain Gaspare Cozza) approached Amantea to recapture it, but eventually gave it up and returned to Cosenza.

The Bourbonians fortified themselves inland at Potame, dominating the road to Cosenza through Lago. In that camp, by order of De Micheli, they received from the mayor of the nobles of Amantea, Giuseppe Cavallo, 500 rations of bread and wine every day at 2 pm.

Three French columns sent by Marshal André Masséna and led by Generals Verdier, Reynier and Julien Auguste Joseph Mermet marched to Amantea on August 24. The clash with the Bourbon masses took place on the slopes of Mount Cocuzzo: the Bourbonians resisted but had to abandon the Potame camp and retreat into the walls of Amantea, which was reached by Verdier on August 28. However, the French retreated.

On September 27, 1806, General Verdier arrived at the gates of the city with two infantry regiments, two cannons and some squads of the civic guard. All of these troops assaulted the city, but were pushed back to Cosenza as early as the following day.

On the wave of optimism during this period many heinous crimes were committed against pro-French citizens and their families, often landowners or noblemen.

Amantea was also a landing place for Bourbon reinforcements from Sicily: in the month of November several chieftains landed there in English boats. Mayor Giuseppe Cavallo was in charge of supplying the troops with provisions. Moreover, Bourbonists from many nearby towns converged on Amantea: for example, on December 1, 1806, the French shot two sailors from Diamante who had rented their boat to transport volunteers from Diamante to Amantea.

== The siege of December 1806 ==
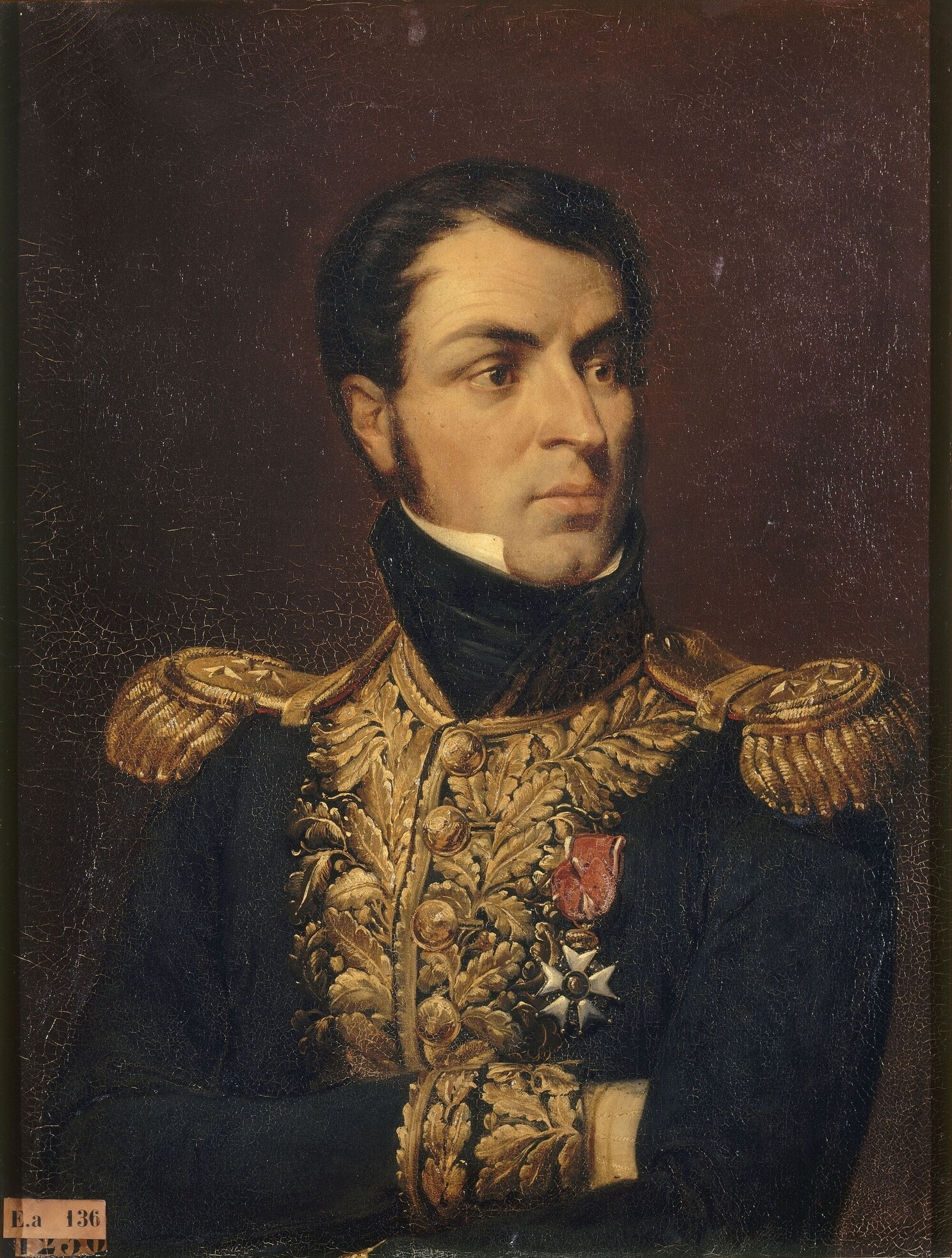
General Jean Reynier (1771–1814), conqueror of Amantea.

On December 3, 1806, the French returned in force from Cosenza to Amantea: 5,000 soldiers led by generals Duhesme, Reynier, Verdier, Ortigoni and Giovanni Battista de' Franceschi. They occupied Lago and San Pietro, encountering resistance from about 1,200 Bourbon troops led by the commanders Mele, Presta, Morrone and Parafante at Lago and by Stocchi, Alice and Lopez at San Pietro. They then began the siege of the town, settling in two encampments, one to the north on the Camolo rise, the other to the south in the Cannavina locality (they occupied, among other places, the convent of San Bernardino da Siena). The French also stationed a garrison on the beach of Amantea to prevent the landing of reinforcements.

The situation of the besieged became difficult. They had three large-caliber cannons placed in the castle and seven smaller artillery pieces located on the bastions and gates of Catocastro and Paraporto.

According to the colorful account given by local historian Gabriele Turchi, water became a scarce and very expensive resource, diluted vinegar was passed off as wine, and rosolio was obtained by steeping dried figs in water. Tempers were inflamed in particular by a Capuchin friar, Father Michael Ala. It is also told of a noblewoman, Baroness Laura Procida, wife of Baron Giulio Cesare Fava, who headed a group of defenders composed of her peasants and servants.

The first French assault was on December 5, on the side of the Mother Church, but the besiegers were repulsed with 40 dead and numerous wounded.

A new assault was attempted on the night of December 8, from the side of the ramp of San Pantaleo (near the Mother Church), led by the Amantean captain serving in the French army Gaspare Cozza. The assault was discovered by a woman, perhaps a prostitute, the commoner Elisabetta Noto (who has become a sort of local heroine today): she in fact seeing the French moving gave the alarm. The French this time had 60 dead, in addition to the wounded.

At this point General Verdier, seeing the heavy losses suffered, ordered a retreat to Cosenza, where he arrived on December 9. Apparently, the Bourbonians pressed the retreating French, capturing about 200 prisoners. On December 19, Ferdinand IV of Naples conferred the rank of lieutenant colonel of infantry on castellan Ridolfo Mirabelli.

== The second siege: January–February 1807 ==
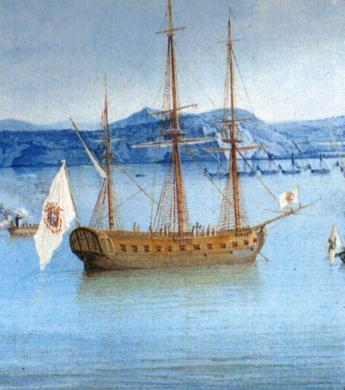
The Bourbon frigate "Minerva," which in January 1807 was stationed in Amantean waters.

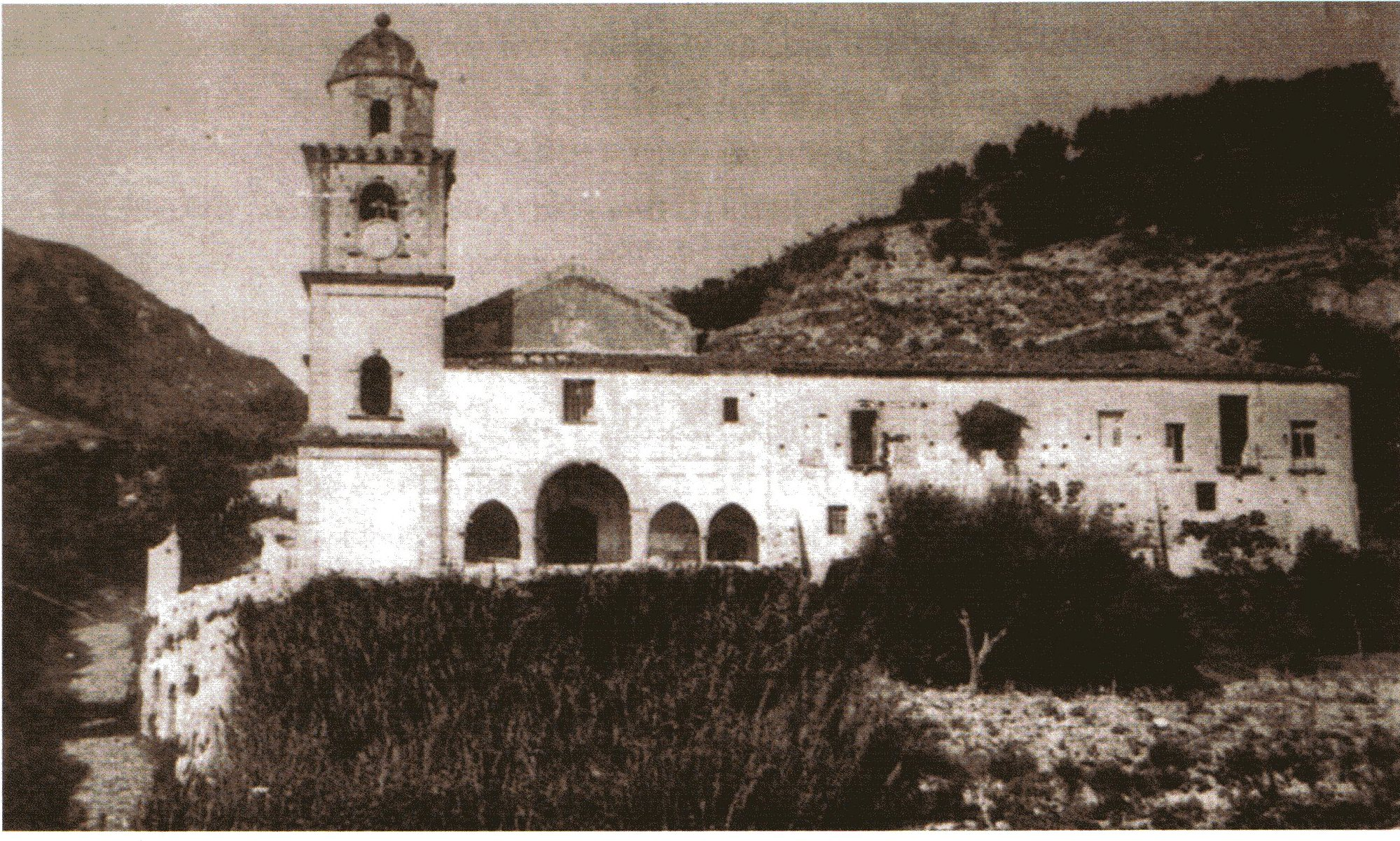
The convent of San Bernardino, one of the strongholds of the besiegers outside the walls, as it looked before the 1905 earthquake. Today the San Bernardino complex is a national monument.

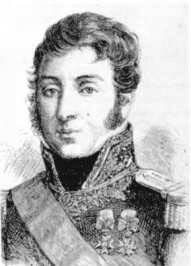
General Jean Antoine Verdier (1767–1839), commander of the besiegers.

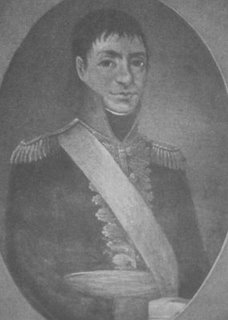
Lieutenant Colonel of Lago, Calabria, Raffaele Falsetti (1767-1836), also known as "Centanni".

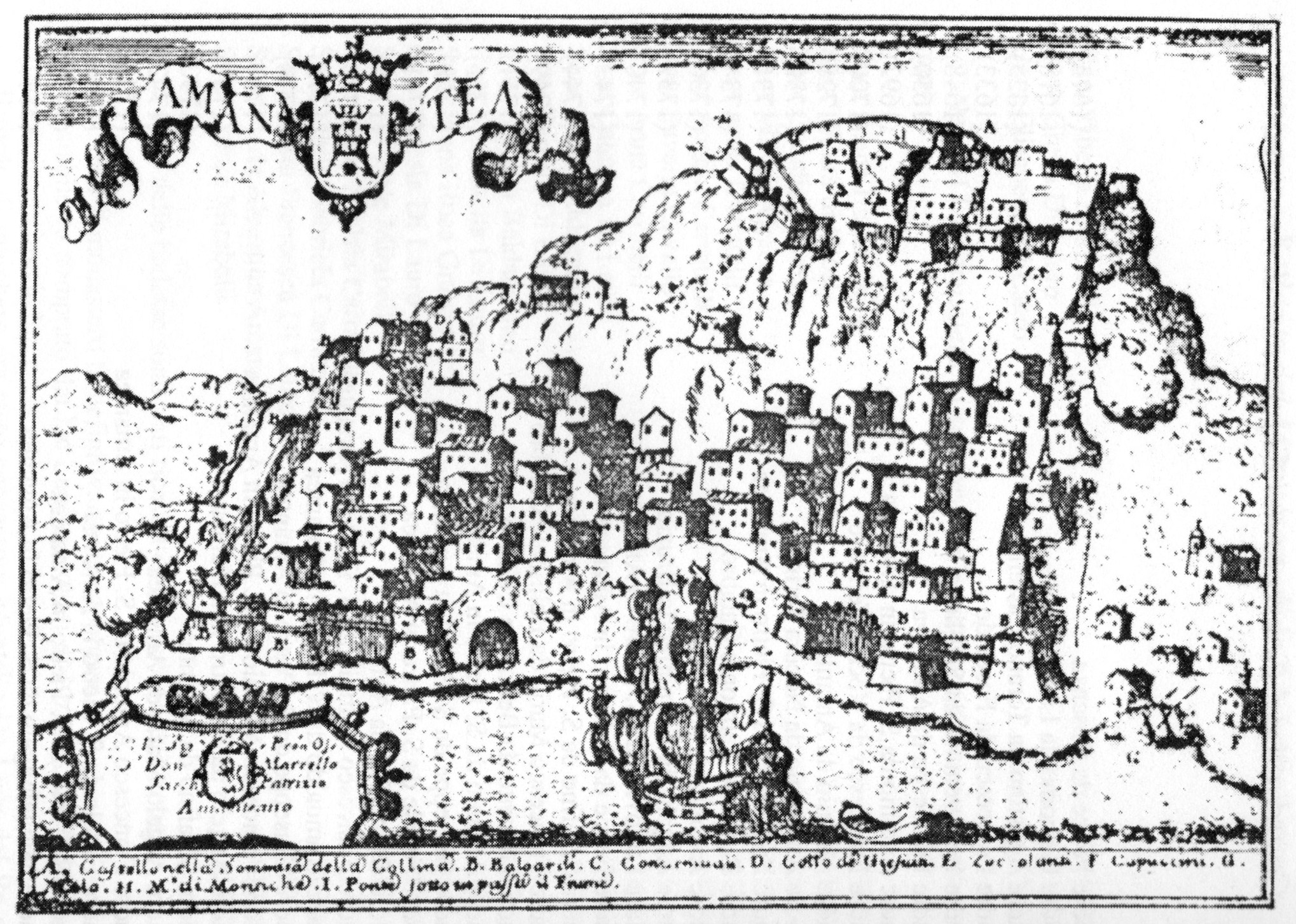
An 18th-century view of Amantea.

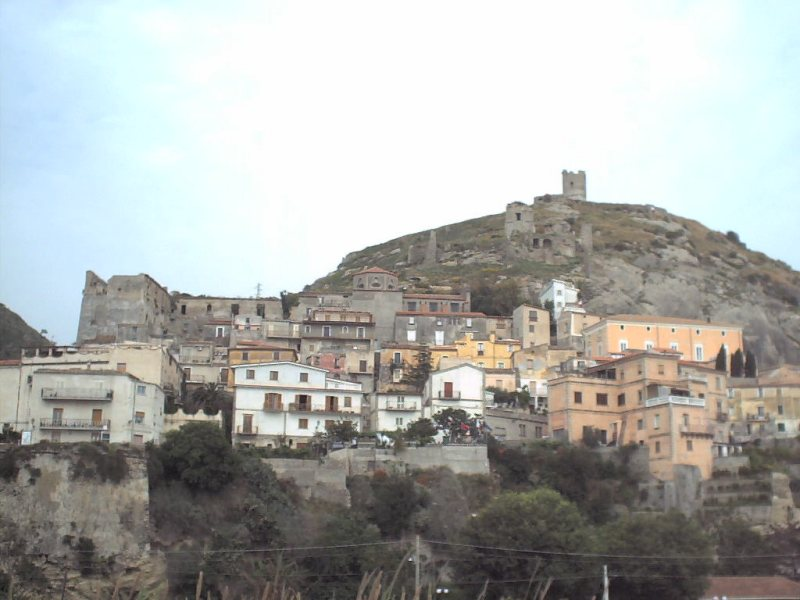
A glimpse of the historic center of Amantea, dominated by the Angevin tower of the castle

=== The deployment ===
French detachments occupied the town Fiumefreddo on December 11 (but not the mighty Castle of the Valley) and Longobardi, headquarters of the Province President De Micheli, on December 26. De Micheli managed to escape by sea, but all his correspondence with the Bourbon command in Sicily and with the sovereigns fell into French hands.

On Dec. 29, 1806, Verdier appeared again in front of Amantea's walls with four battalions of about 2,400 men, a company of cannoneers commanded by General Charles Pierre Lubin Griois, a company of sappers of the Engineer Corps commanded by Lieutenant Colonel Étienne Jacques Joseph Alexandre Macdonald, a Corsican regiment of 300 men, 800 vaulters commanded by General Jacques Gilles Henri Goguet and about 2,000 civic guards commanded by Major Falcone.

In the evening of the same day, General Luigi Peyri began the siege of Belmonte.

On January 2, 1807 due to strong winds, the French were forced to abandon their camp at Pianette. However, on the same evening of January 2 Verdier returned to deploy his men in the siege: a battalion and regiment of Corsicans was deployed on the high ground of Camolo, two battalions in the Catocastro valley between Lago and Poliano to guard the road to Cosenza and the Vadi pass bound for Belmonte, a company in San Pietro and a battalion in the locality of Cannavina south of Amantea, while the civic guards controlled the rear and prevented supplies to the besieged. The sappers had dug two trenches, one from San Bernardino alla Taverna toward the coast, the other from San Bernardino al Carmine.

Artillery was placed in the convent of San Bernardino, while a 12-pounder (95 mm today) cannon and a howitzer were placed on the Carmine church (which was outside the walls), a howitzer and a mortar were placed at Cannavina, and two 4-pounder (65 mm today) pieces were placed at Camolo.

The French spread the false news that Belmonte had fallen, to dismay the besieged. Artillery fire began on Jan. 5. The next day, Jan. 6, the Bourbon frigate "Minerva" and two corvettes from Sicily appeared off the waters of Amantea, joined on Jan. 11 by a schooner and a gunboat, which attempted a landing that same day at about noon, being repulsed by French artillery.

On January 13, the besieged attempted a sortie toward the navy to try to make contact with the Bourbon fleet, and partly succeeded although they were driven back. One child in particular is reported to have reached the fleet by swimming, pelted by French gunfire. The next day Verdier initiated the construction of a fort on the coast to prevent new contact with the fleet. The President of the Province, Giovanni Battista De Micheli, who had meanwhile returned to Longobardi, said in a report that "it was difficult even for a cat to enter the city."

=== The decisive attacks ===
Between Jan. 15 and 16 the town was violently attacked by artillery, which caused a breach in the southern wall on the Carmine side. The subsequent French assault failed, and indeed on the evening of Jan. 15 about 200 Bourbon troops led by Raffaele Falsetti (known as "Centanni" by many locals), a Lieutenant Colonel born in Lago, Calabria, who was not very favorable to the suggestion of a surrender that now seemed imminent. However, Falsetti and his troops managed to escape the besieged town and reach Belmonte, which was also still holding out. The French probably did not hinder the escape, believing that it would weaken the garrison.

On Jan. 18, the French captured 48 cattle and 40 sheep that the neighboring Belmontese had sent to the besieged Amanteans, who were now reduced to starvation and despair. Meanwhile, artillery and mines caused new collapses in the walls on the Carmine side. The besieged defended themselves by throwing boulders and boiling liquid on the French.

General Verdier returned to Cosenza, and left the command of operations to Peyri, deeming the resistance of the Amanteans to be at an end. In fact, the Bourbonians had begun to split, between those who were in favor of surrender, such as the castellan Ridolfo Mirabelli, and those who wanted to resist to the bitter end, such as Antonio and Luigi Mariano (perpetrators of most of the crimes against the pro-French or presumed pro-French that had occurred in the previous months). Mirabelli ordered the arrest of Luigi Mariano.

A column of Bourbonists, led by Onofrio Mancini, arrived from Belmonte on January 19, with the aim of disturbing the besiegers. Meanwhile, General Peyrì sent Colonel Luigi Amato, one of the two Amantean officers who served in the French army, to speak with Ridolfo Mirabelli to demand the surrender of the town. Mirabelli asked for ten days of truce to reflect, the French offered only 2 hours, and then Mirabelli refused any agreement.

At two o'clock in the morning of January 20, 1807, French artillery fire on Amantea began again; however, in the following days there were no further attacks, while sappers dug tunnels to undermine the walls from the inside (Gabriele Turchi recounts that the besieged, not understanding what those excavations were for, laughed at those operations, saying they would fill those pits with French corpses).

In the meantime, Longobardi was taken again, many chieftains died in its defense, and the captured President De Micheli himself managed to take shelter in Fiumefreddo; a British frigate, commanded by Admiral William Sidney Smith's nephew, appeared on the coast of Amantea on January 27, bringing reinforcements for the Amanteans. The besieged succeeded in sending a messenger to the ship, a certain Giuseppe Francesco Secreti known as "Gal Gal," who then remained on board the ship to present himself to the sovereigns in Palermo on behalf of the Amanteans. Another frigate and two Bourbon corvettes came to the frigate's rescue on January 29, however, the landing attempt failed under the shots of the French artillery.

=== Toward surrender ===
At that point General Reynier took command of operations, arriving from Cosenza with two 12-pounder guns and a mortar, determined to enter Amantea. On January 30 Colonel Amato was again sent to speak with Ridolfo Mirabelli, who showed himself willing to accept the terms of surrender: however, many foreign Bourbonists, and in particular Marcello Lopez who had the rank of ensign, accused the same castellan Mirabelli of treason and collusion with the French "conculcators of altars, talkers of liberty but proponents, because they were foreigners, of the most foul servitude," and opposed the surrender. Retaliation was threatened against the family members of Colonel Amato himself who were in the city, and the French responded by holding hostage a child who had been sent to them as a messenger.

Around 2 p.m. on February 5, 1807, the 1900-pound mine of gunpowder loaded under the walls on the Paraporto side was detonated: the entire bastion collapsed, and to this day that place is known by the toponym of "'a mina." From the breach the Carabinieri of the 22nd Infantry penetrated first, and when night fell and the fighting stopped, it was clear that the next day all of Amantea would fall: the most facinorous outsiders abandoned Amantea on the side of the Catocastro River, and Ridolfo Mirabelli convinced the others to capitulate.

At dawn on February 6 the white flag was hoisted over the castle, and Mirabelli sent Lieutenant Trigona to General Reynier with an offer of capitulation, which was promptly accepted. Mirabelli had to go to the French camp by lowering himself from the walls with a rope, as the Bourbon garrison at the Paraporto gate refused to open it. The surrender was signed in a farmhouse in the Rota district, near the Carmine Church. An epigraph commemorating the siege, dictated by Marquis Ernesto De Luca of Lizzano, was placed on the facade of that house in the early twentieth century.

The square was supposed to capitulate by 3 p.m. on February 7, however Mirabelli struggled to convince many of his men to obey him, and one of the two Amantean officers serving in the French army, Gaspare Cozza, also had to intervene. Eventually, around 10 a.m. on February 7, the blockades at the gates of Paraporto and Catocastro were removed and a company of French vaulters occupied what remained of the castle.

== Events after the surrender ==
Ridolfo Mirabelli was given the honor of arms by the French, who escorted him to Palmi, where he was embarked on Admiral Smith's British frigate. He later reached Palermo, where he was enlisted in the regular Bourbon army and fought again in Calabria at the Battle of Mileto (May 28, 1807). However, shortly afterwards he was arrested for debts at the request of creditors and imprisoned in Messina.

The command of the square of Amantea was given to General Ortigoni. The latter had twenty-four Bourbon chieftains responsible for the resistance arrested and had twenty-one of them shot between February 18 and 25, 1807: these were the Amanteans Antonio Mariano, Nicola Morello, Francesco and Giuseppe Apa, Gaetano Vetere, Gennaro Morelli, Giuseppe Lombardo, Gaetano Mariano, Belmontese Francesco and Giuseppe Tirri, Gaetano Janni from Lago, Pietro Donnici from Crotone, Gabriele Bruni from San Lucido, Antonio Muro from Rofrano, and Luigi Mele from Catanzaro.

A local civic guard, made up of pro-French citizens, was established, and the walls and all fortifications were dismantled. Amantea's population had been reduced from about 3,000 to 800, and Gabriele Turchi reports that the first marriage after the siege was celebrated on March 30, 1807, over a month after the capitulation, between widowers.

Sporadic and disorganized attempts at a Bourbon reconquest of the city occurred, in May and on June 28. However, the strong French presence prevented everything.

== See also ==
- Fra Diavolo
- Amantea
- War of the Third Coalition

== Bibliography ==
- Maria Greco, Luigi (1872). Annali di Citeriore Calabria dal 1806 al 1811 (1st ed.).
- Ritondale, Franceschino (1960). "L'assedio di Amantea nel 1806". Calabria Letteraria. p. 46.
- Turchi, Gabriele (2002). Storia di Amantea. Cosenza: Periferia Editore. ISBN 8887080658.
