= Amantea Castle =

Castle in Calabria, Italy

- Amantea, Calabria in Italy
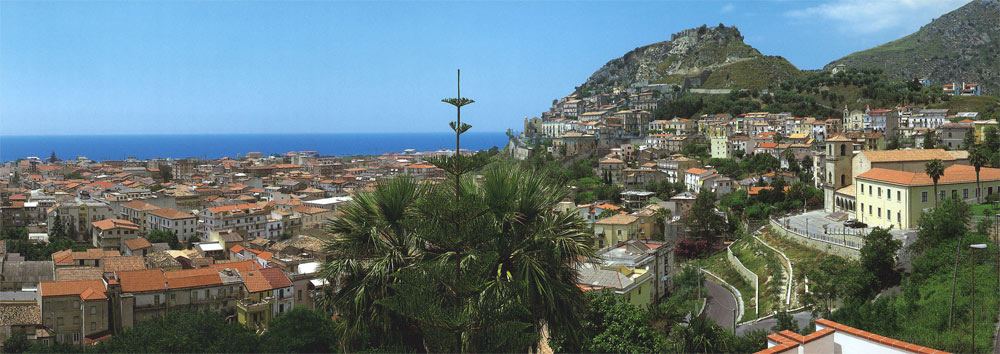
- Panorama of the modern expansion and the castle cliff from the Church of San Bernardino da Siena.

Site information
- Type: Irregular trapezoidal with angular towers
- Owner: Folino Family
- Condition: In ruins

Location
- Coordinates: 39.137613°N 16.075181°E
- Height: 149 m

Site history
- Materials: Irregularly rough-hewn lithic blocks
- Battles/wars: Angevin siege of 1269, Aragonese siege of 1288, French siege of 1806-1807

The Amantea Castle (formerly Regio castello di Amantea) is located in the town of the same name, in the province of Cosenza, in the lower Tyrrhenian Sea of Cosenza. Dominating the coastal road and the road to Cosenza that runs along the Catocastro River valley, it was once an important stronghold under the Byzantines, Arabs, Normans, Swabians, Angevins and Aragonese. It was restored in the viceregal period and under the Bourbons, but suffered severe damage during the earthquakes of 1638 and 1783; it was left in a state of neglect after the disastrous 1806-1807 siege suffered by Napoleonic troops.

Currently the castle is in ruins, and access to the remains on the hill overlooking the city is strenuous and dangerous. In 2008, ownership of the surrounding area was acquired by the City of Amantea.

== History ==
=== Early fortifications: Arabs and Byzantines ===
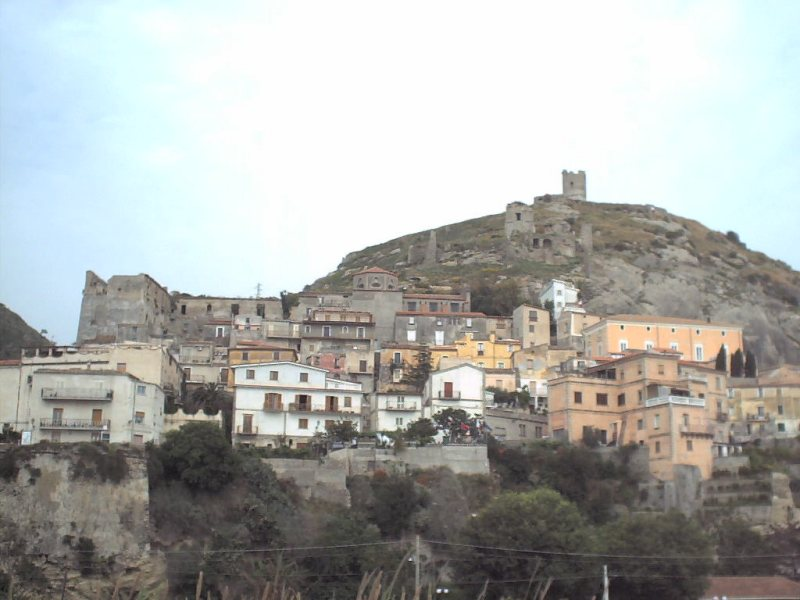
The Catocastro district, dominated by the ruins of the Jesuit college, Franciscan church and convent, and, at the top, the Angevin tower that was part of the castle complex.

In ancient times the city of Lampeteia or Clampetia, a probable Crotonian colony also inhabited by indigenous Bruttian people, stood in Amantean territory. This city, already decaying in the imperial age, was wiped out by the earthquake and tidal wave of 365: a new city, Nepetia ("new city" or "new camp" in Greek), arose in its vicinity. Nepetia was occupied by the Byzantines and after 553 it was the seat of a military governorate and a stronghold on the northern borders of the theme of Calabria.

It was therefore the Byzantines who first fortified the site of present-day Amantea: however, the present name was given to the town by Arab rule. In 846, in fact, Nepetia was conquered by the Arabs of Sicily and renamed "Al-Mantiah," "the fortress." Amantea remained Arab for forty years, and was the seat of an emirate: the name of only one emir is known, As-Sinsim, latinized as Cincimo, who in 868 went so far as to attempt the conquest of Cosenza. The Byzantines reconquered the city in the year 272 of the Hijrah, that is, 885-886. Amantea became an episcopal see, and in the 10th century it incorporated into its diocese the territory of the episcopal see of the now-decayed city of Temesa.

The Emir of Sicily Abu l-Qasim Ali reconquered Amantea in 976, and it was again under Arab rule until 1031-1032, when it was again occupied by the Byzantines.

=== From the Normans to the Aragonese ===
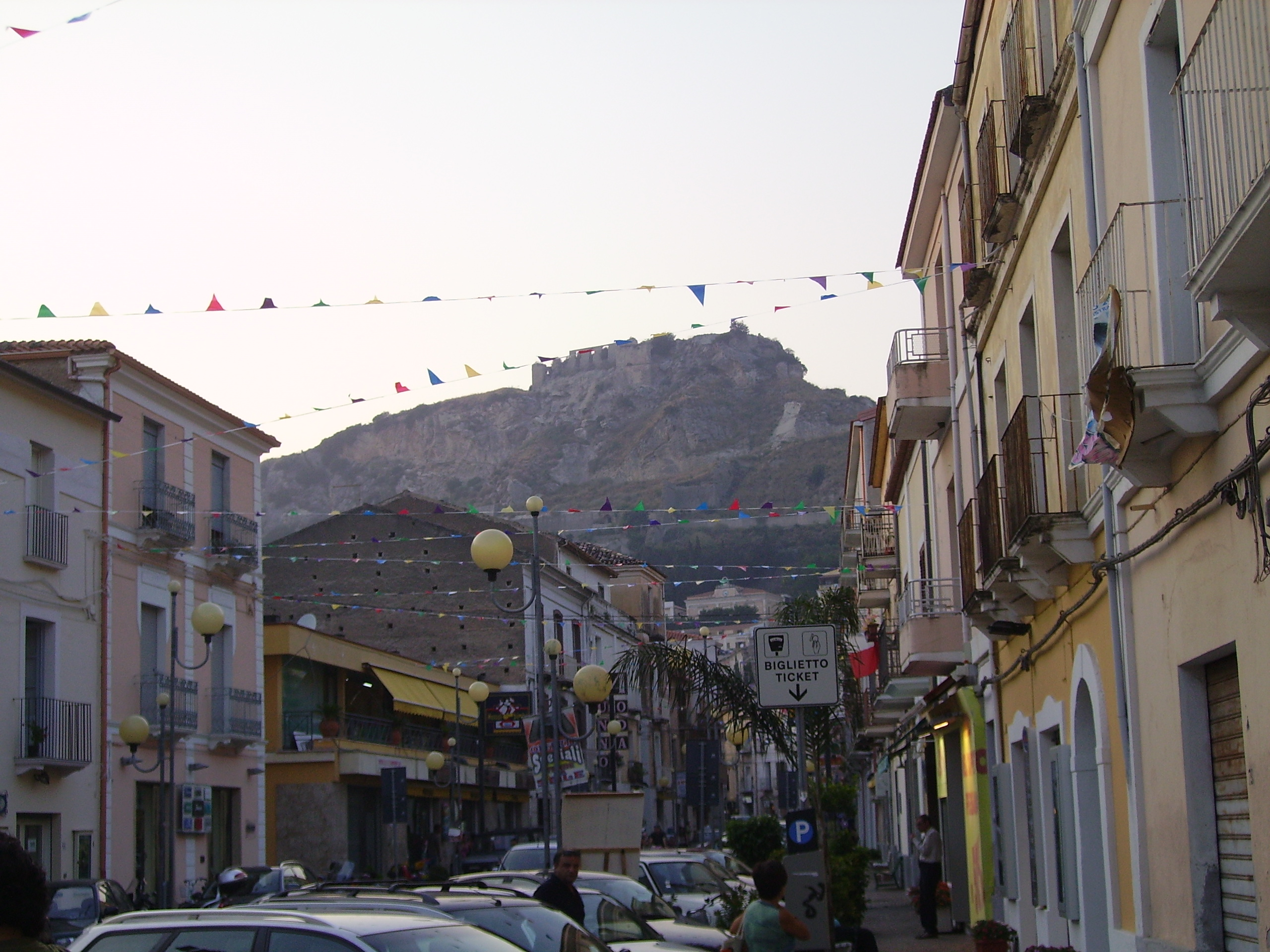
Glimpse of the castle from Corso Vittorio Emanuele.

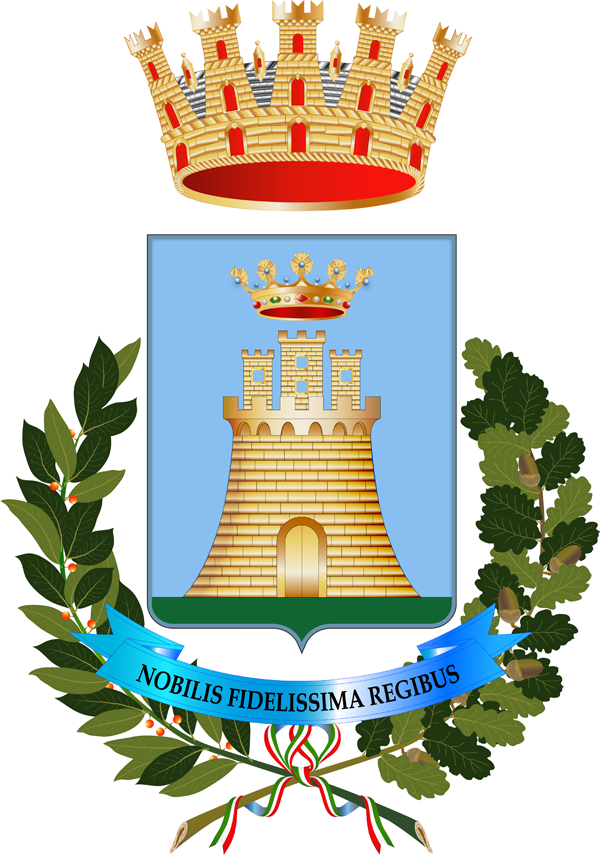
City coat of arms: the stylization of the castle, with the motto Nobilis Fidelissima Regibus.

The Normans conquered Amantea in 1060-1061, driving out the Byzantines once and for all. In 1094 the diocese of Amantea was aggregated with that of Tropea, as part of the Latinization of cults in southern Italy desired by the papacy and the Norman rulers. During Norman rule Amantea decayed, replaced as an important center of control of the territory by nearby Aiello Calabro.

Under Swabian rule the castle was strengthened, as part of the plan of repopulation of the coastal areas desired by Frederick II. By virtue of the Swabian good governance, Amantea and other castles in the area (Aiello, Cleto) tenaciously resisted the new French-born ruler Charles I of Anjou: the latter sent Count Pietro Ruffo of Catanzaro to reconquer the city, which resisted the overwhelming Angevin forces throughout May 1269, before capitulating in mid-June of that year. The rebels were almost all atrociously punished.

To keep any future revolts at bay, the Angevins built the castle of Belmonte Calabro on Amantean territory, the core around which the town of the same name would develop.

Amantea was at the center of the events of the so-called "ninety-year war" between Anjou and Aragon for the possession of the Kingdom of Naples and Sicily, which followed the casus belli of the Sicilian Vespers. The Amorotan population was of Aragonese tendency; the castle, defended by two hundred men and well supplied with provisions by the Angevin loyal castellans, was besieged by the Aragonese fleet and army in 1288, and capitulated on honorable terms. The castle returned to the Angevins by virtue of the Peace of Caltabellotta in 1302: after a period of retaliation against the Amanteans for their Aragonese faith, the city obtained from the last Angevin-Durassic rulers important exemptions and privileges that brought an increase in population.

In 1391 Ladislaus of Naples enfeoffed Amantea to the doge of Genoa Antoniotto Adorno, as a restitution of loans granted to him by the latter. In any case, in 1425 Louis III of Anjou decreed Amantea and its castle inalienable possessions of the royal domain. René of Anjou nevertheless granted the fiefdom again to Margaret of Poitiers, second wife of the Marquis of Catanzaro Niccolò Ruffo, and in 1458, on the death of Alfonso I of Aragon, the first Aragonese ruler of Naples and Sicily, the Amanteans rose up against the enfeoffment, siding with the Angevin pretender to the Neapolitan throne, John II of Anjou.

Eventually King Ferdinand I of Naples moved the feudatory Margaret of Poitiers from Amantea to Rende, and the revolt returned, but Amantea was the last of the Calabrian castles to return under Aragonese control.

Amantea also risked being enfeoffed in the seventeenth century, on two occasions, due to the constant depletion of viceregal coffers: the first by the prince of nearby Belmonte Giovanni Battista Ravaschieri in 1630-1633, and the second by the Grand Duke of Tuscany Ferdinando II de' Medici in 1647. On both occasions the population proudly defended its status as a state town, even moving to the court in Madrid.

Under the Aragonese, the castle was entrusted to the Carafa family, dukes of Maddaloni. In 1489 the castle was visited by Alfonso II of Naples, on an inspection trip to the castles of his kingdom: the sovereign was welcomed by the castellan Giovanni Tommaso Carafa, and visited the church and convent of San Bernardino da Siena. During the brief interlude of the occupation of Charles VIII of France (1496-1498), the castellan Giovanni Tommaso Carafa had to side with the French, but the population sent a delegation to pay homage to the ousted Aragonese ruler Ferrante of Aragon, who had taken refuge in Ischia. At the end of the Aragonese dynasty, a war broke out between France and Spain for the possession of territories in southern Italy; Amantea sided with the Spaniards: in 1504 during the war 85 Spaniards led by Gomez de Solis landed on the Amantean beaches, pushing inland to give aid to the Spanish garrison in Cosenza besieged by the French. Eventually the war was won by the "Catholic king" Ferdinand II of Aragon, and Naples became a Spanish viceroyalty.

=== The viceregal period and the Bourbons ===
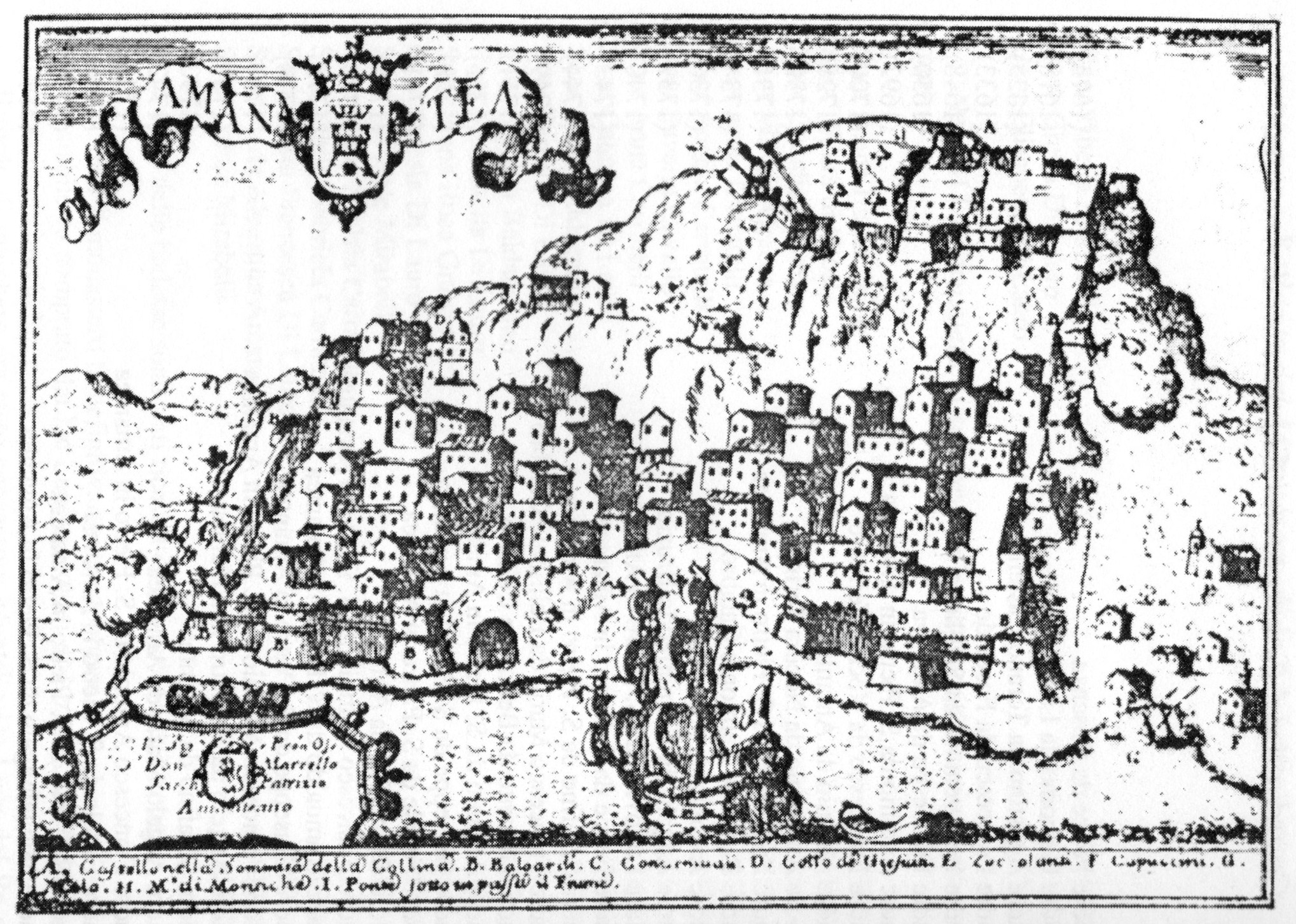
View of Amantea and its castle in the eighteenth century (Giovanni Battista Pachinelli, Il Regno di Napoli in prospettiva, Naples 1703).

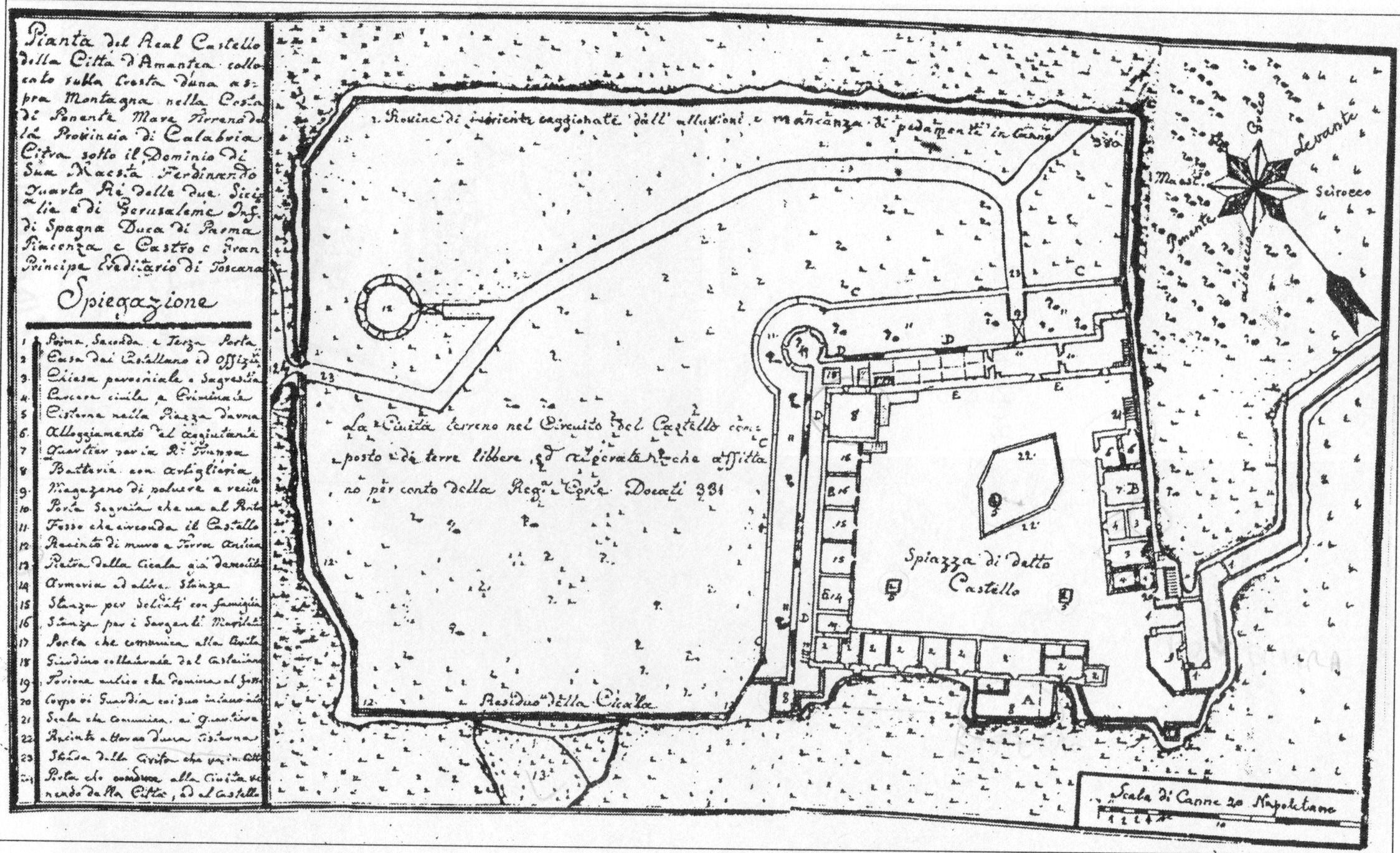
The castle of Amantea at the time of Ferdinand I of the Two Sicilies (1759-1799 and 1799-1806), just before the French siege.

In 1536 Juan Sarmiento, sent by Charles V of Habsburg to check the state of the fortifications of the Viceroyalty, reported that the castle, in the words of local historian Gabriele Turchi, was "unsuitable even as a shelter for thieves." Therefore, between 1538 and 1544 the architects Giovanni Maria Buzzacarino (also active at Crotone Castle) and Gian Giacomo dell'Acaya (designer of the fortified village of Acaya in Apulia) worked on the castle. The large southern scarp bastion was built at this stage.

Nevertheless, the castle was already on its way to abandonment. In 1611, in a report on the castles of the Viceroyalty, it is stated that:

The Amantea Castle sits high on a mountain and at its foot is the town looking out to sea, it has no harbor or anything else of note, and so all the expense savings that can be made will be well justified.

— Biblioteca Nazionale di Napoli, ms. Ius. I.F.S. 4, in Gabriele Turchi, Storia di Amantea, Cosenza 2002.

The earthquake of 1638 caused serious damage to the castle's structures. New restorations were carried out in 1694, at the expense of 365 ducats; in 1757 (already in Bourbon times, on the orders of Charles III of Spain), at the expense of 136 ducats; in 1766, under the direction of the military engineer Giovanni Galenza: these last works were thwarted by an earthquake in 1767. Further and greater damage was caused by the devastating earthquake of 1783. To repair these last major damages, the military engineer Andrea Depuis arrived from Naples in 1786, who directed the work for the amount of 390 ducats.

During the events of the Neapolitan Republic (1799), Amantea spontaneously surrendered to the Jacobins: the population in fact disarmed the castle garrison, and planted the tree of liberty, led by Ridolfo Mirabelli, leader of the square during the brief revolutionary period. In fact, after not even a month the Sanfedists led by Cardinal Fabrizio Ruffo arrived, and they quickly came to the head of the Jacobin resistance attempt.

It was with the Napoleonic invasion that the castle of Amantea had its last moment of glory. Amantea was occupied on March 12, 1806 by a detachment of 200 Polish vaulters, who remained barricaded in the castle until news of the French defeat at the Battle of Maida (July 4, 1806). Then they retreated toward Cosenza, leaving the square to an Anglo-Bourbon fleet that had been at anchor off Amantea for days. Within the city walls the Bourbon chieftains began to organize resistance to the impending counterattack in force by the French, similar to what was being done in neighboring countries. During those weeks within the towns of Calabria, crimes and violence were perpetuated against Jacobins or supposed Jacobins, often just personal enemies of the Bourbons in command at the time.

In any case, the main French attack began on December 5, 1806: the besieging forces amounted to 5,000 men with an artillery division commanded by Generals Guillaume Philibert Duhesme, Jean Reynier, Jean-Antoine Verdier, and the Amantea-born Lieutenant Colonel Luigi Amato. The besieged Bourbons amounted to a few hundred, equipped with 12 guns in all, and were led by Ridolfo Mirabelli, who at the end of the siege would be decorated with the rank of lieutenant colonel by King Ferdinand I of the Two Sicilies. The square of Amantea held out strenuously until February 7, 1807, when Mirabelli and Reynier signed an honorable capitulation.

== Description ==
The castle occupies a plateau with a beautiful view of both the small gulf of the Oliva River on the Tyrrhenian Sea (and on north wind days it is even possible to see the island of Stromboli and Pizzo), and the valley of the Catocastro River, through which one reaches Cosenza along the ancient route of the via Popilia.

It was probably in the Norman and Swabian ages that the southern part of the hill was heavily fortified, decentralized with respect to the built-up area, but aimed at the objectives that were of interest to keep under control at that time, namely the communication routes between the coast and the interior.

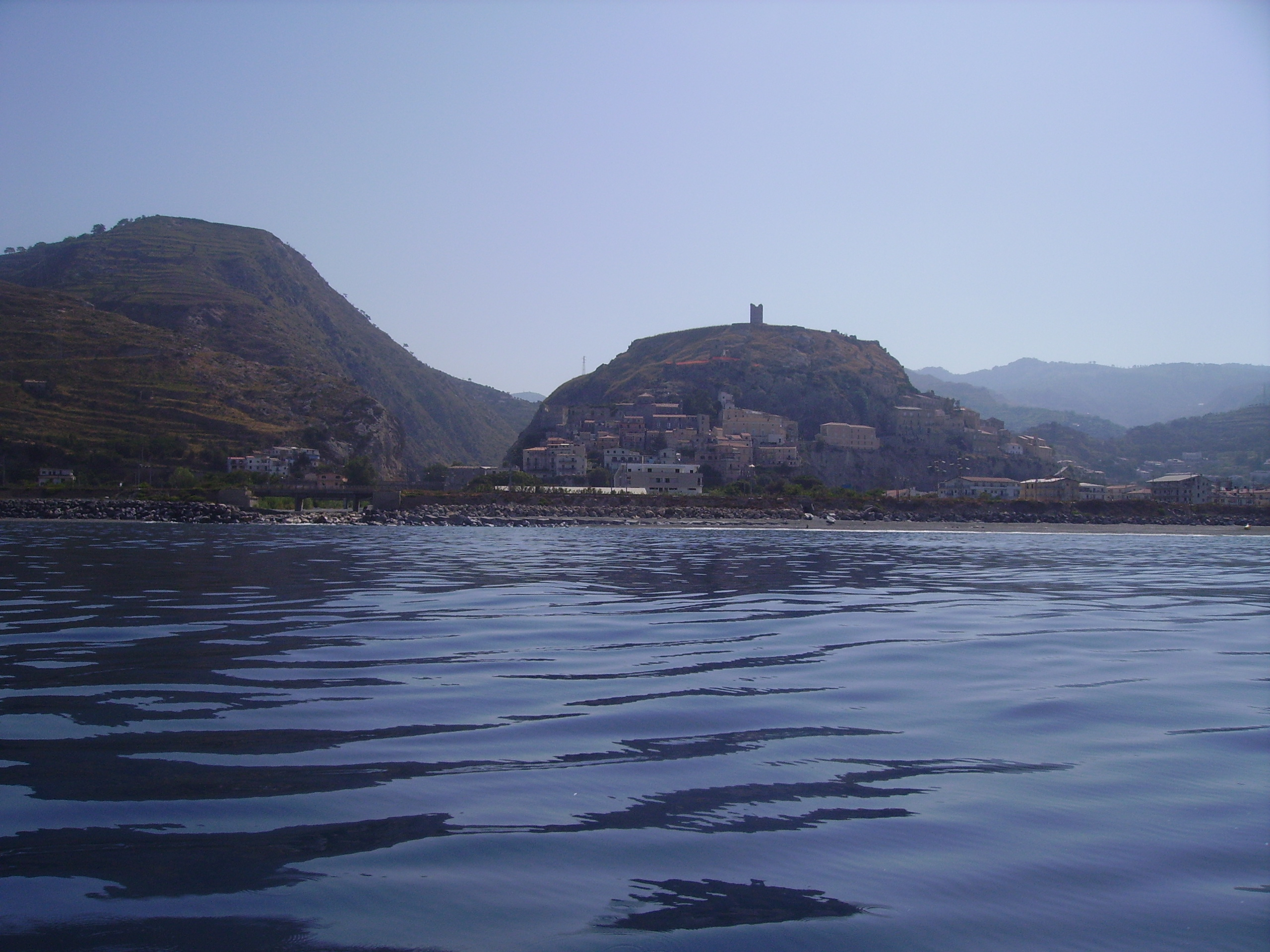
Amantea and its castle (of which only the Angevin tower is visible) from the sea.

The northwest-facing oval keep, known as San Nicola, was built in the Angevin age, judging by the coat of arms bearing the fleurs-de-lis of France that remains on it; and also in the Angevin age, apparently during the reign of Joanna I of Naples, the circular tower overlooking the sea was built, isolated from the actual fortified complex. This tower is similar in construction technique to that of the castle of Paola.

In the Aragonese period the castle was modernized according to the dictates of Francesco di Giorgio Martini and of " modern-style fortification," in order to resist the shots of the new firearms: the walls were lowered but reinforced in thickness, an access ravelin was built on the eastern side (now completely collapsed), and a rampart was built that preceded the moat along its entire length. The castle was bastioned, as already mentioned, in 1538-1544, by well-known architects such as Buzzacarrino and Gian Giacomo dell'Acaya: today the large south-facing bastion is almost entirely preserved, resting on the living rock of the cliff, a formidable defense in itself.

Very few remnants of the castle's interiors remain today, so it is possible to learn more about them only by scrolling through 18th-century plans and views. The castle had a quadrangular perimeter, unfolded around the parade ground, beneath which were three cisterns for collecting rainwater. The castellan's and officers' quarters were arranged along the southern side, communicating with the sixteenth-century bastion; soldiers with families were housed on the western side, while the others lodged on the northern side, where the armory was also located. Along the eastern side were the jails and the chapel. The powder magazine was also located on the eastern side, near the main entrance. Three large artillery rooms were planned: one in the southern bastion, one at the southwest corner facing the Paraport quarter, and the other by the keep at the northwest corner.

This large quadrangle was all surrounded by a moat, already overgrown with weeds in the 18th century, and still existing today: in particular, the masonry part of the secondary access to the castle on the northern side remains. The drawbridge has been destroyed. Beyond the moat, the rest of the plateau was surrounded by a crumbling wall as early as the eighteenth century, which formed a sort of "citadel" or "advance" designed to trap the enemy who managed to penetrate it (a structure similar to that of the nearby castle of Aiello Calabro). To the west of the plateau rises the Angevin tower, perhaps the best-preserved part of the castle and the most visible from the modern town, which has developed toward the sea.

It is possible to go up to the castle from at least four paths, which are rather difficult: one starts from Strada Tirrena just before the confluence with Corso Umberto I, another begins to the right of the Carmine church in Corso Umberto I, a third (Salita San Francesco) runs from the ancient city gate until it reaches the ruins of the Franciscan complex below the Angevin tower, and a fourth one starts from the Collegio church (to which the imposing ruins of the former Jesuit college are annexed).

=== Garrison and armament ===
In 1288 the garrison of the castle consisted of 200 men, of whom 100 were crossbowmen; by 1559, in the viceregal period, it had dwindled to 4 soldiers and 1 castellan; in 1584 the garrison amounted to 6 posts including a castellan and officers; in 1611 to 5 posts including a castellan and officers.

In that same year the castle armament consisted of 2 cannons, 1 falcon, 1 falconet, 19 small-caliber cannons. Seven years later, in 1618, the castle had 10 "worn and broken" bronze cannons. In 1619 there were inventoried 54 arquebuses, 22 barrels of gunpowder, 10 quintals of lead, 98 eleven-pound lead balls, 30 six-pound lead balls, 47 two-pound lead balls, 321 eight-ounce lead balls, 250 small lead balls, 50 musket balls, a chest with armor, "rusted" iron arms and armbands, 11 barrels of sulfur and 2 of saltpeter, a pile of stone balls, an iron mace; in 1624 54 arquebuses, 43 powder flasks, 22 barrels of powder, 2 cannons, 1 falconet, cannonballs of large and medium caliber, 11 barrels of sulfur and 10 of saltpeter, an iron club. Finally, in 1806, during the siege of Amantea, the castle and the town were defended by 3 large-caliber cannons plus 9 smaller-caliber ones deployed on the town walls and gates.

== See also ==
- Amantea
- Kingdom of Naples
- Province of Cosenza

== Bibliography ==
- Dragone, Sergio; Massimo Tigani Sava, Massimo (1997). Castelli e Torri di Calabria. Vol. I. Catanzaro: Calabria Economica.
- Turchi, Gabriele (2002). Storia di Amantea. Cosenza: Edizioni Periferia. ISBN 88-87080-65-8.
- Le Rose, Maria Gabriella (2008). Luoghi di potere normanno-svevi in Calabria Citra. Cosenza: Publiepa Edizioni. ISBN 978-88-87104-26-4.
