= Oliva (river) =

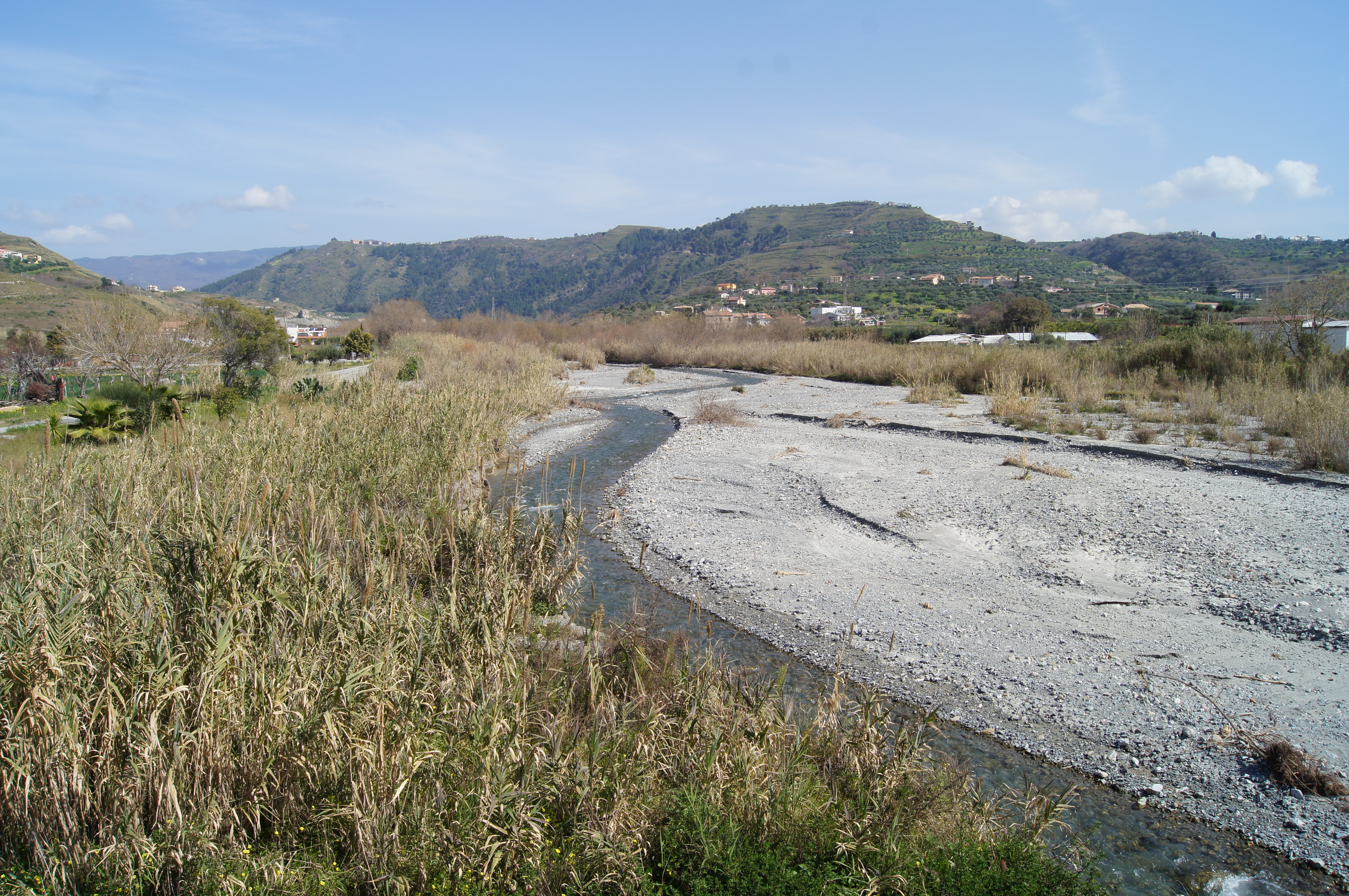
- Native name: Fiume Oliva (Italian)

Location
- Country: Italy
- Region: Calabria
- Cities: Campora San Giovanni, Coreca (Amantea)

Physical characteristics
- Source
  - location: Sila Mountains
  - coordinates: 39°11′04″N 16°11′49″E
- Mouth: Tyrrhenian Sea
  - coordinates: 39°04′38″N 16°05′14″E
  - elevation: sea level
- Length: 18 km (11 mi)

Oliva (Fiume Oliva in Italian; Jumu d'Oliva in local dialect) is a river in Calabria, Southern Italy. On the southern Tyrrhenian side, within the municipality of Amantea (specifically, the frazioni Coreca and Campora San Giovanni) in the Province of Cosenza, which gives its name to the entire valley it flows through (the Olivo valley). It is considered part of the Scala Basin, which contains an aquifer. It was in news for the alleged environmental pollution associated with the beaching of the "Jolly Rosso" on 14 December 1990 and its subsequent breaking in 1991. The river was again in the news in 2011 as an investigation into possible illegal dumping of hazardous waste (including Cesium 137) in the river was undertaken and reported to the European Union.

== The course of the river ==
The river basin is located on the Tyrrhenian side of the Coastal Range and touches the mountain municipalities of Malito, Lago, Grimaldi, Aiello Calabro and San Pietro in Amantea, the flatter area lies entirely in the territory of Amantea. Its general development is along the north-east-southwest direction and is limited to the north of Monte Scudiero (1295 m.), from Monte Mondia (644 m.) And from Monte Pellegrino (644 m.); to the south from Monte Santa Lucerna (1256 mt.), from Monte Faeto (1103 mt.) and from Monte Sant'Angelo (778 mt.) and from Cozzo Carmineantonio (Carmineantonio Hill). The basin ends its flattest development in the territory of Campora San Giovanni. Analyzing the course of the river you can see a dense network of watercourses that flow into the main bed: three on the right and six on the left, as well as minor tributaries, thus forming a dendritic hydrographic system.
