= Amantea =

Amantea Αμάνθεα (Greek)
- Comune
- Comune di Amantea
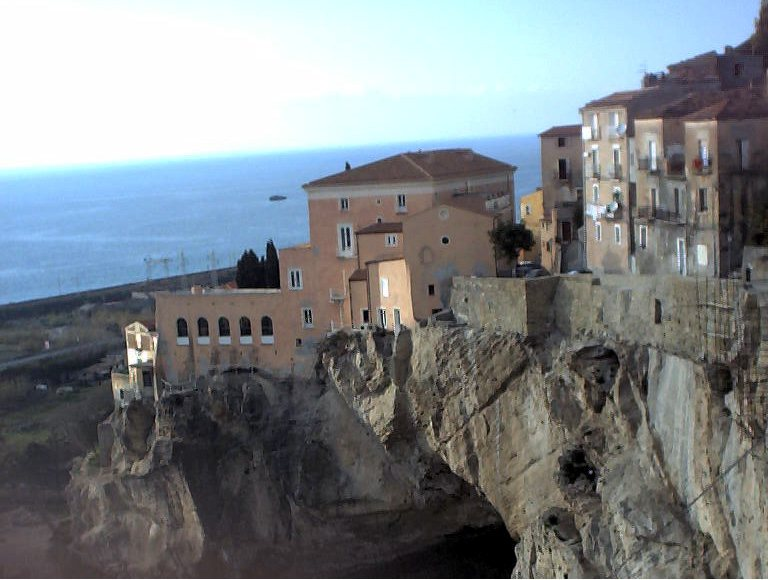
- View of Amantea on the sea with the Palazzo delle Clarisse

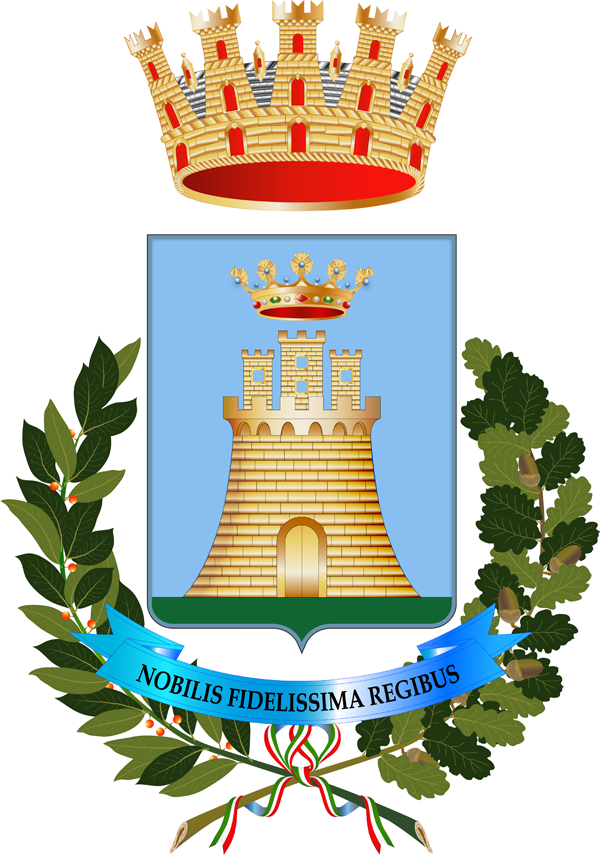
- Coat of arms

- Location of Amantea within the province of Cosenza

- Location of Amantea in Italy Amantea (Calabria)
- Coordinates: 39°08′N 16°04′E
- Country: Italy
- Region: Calabria
- Province: Cosenza (CS)
- Frazioni: Acquicella, Camoli, Campora San Giovanni, Coreca, Colongi

Government
  - Mayor: Commissario prefettizio

Area
  - Total: 29.46 km^{2} (11.37 sq mi)
- Elevation: 50 m (160 ft)

Population (5 June 2018)
  - Total: 14,075
  - Density: 477.8/km^{2} (1,237/sq mi)
- Demonym: Amanteani
- Time zone: UTC+1 (CET)
  - Summer (DST): UTC+2 (CEST)
- Postal code: 87032
- Dialing code: 0982
- Patron saint: St. Anthony of Padua
- Saint day: June 13
- Website: Official website

Amantea (Calabrian: A' Mantia; Greek: Amanthea) is a town, former bishopric, comune (municipality) and Latin Catholic titular see in the province of Cosenza in the Calabria region of southern Italy. It is the twentieth municipality in the region by population, while for population density it is ranked twenty-fourth. It is a tourist centre on the southern Tyrrhenian Sea coast.

== History ==
Amantea appears as a centre of its own in the 7th century, although traces of human presence from pre-historical times onwards have been found in the area. In 839 the Arabs captured it, being ousted by the Byzantines in 889. Later it was under Norman domination. In 1269 the Amanteani rebelled against the Angevines in the name of Conradin of Hohenstaufen, but were besieged by the French and defeated. In 1638, an earthquake destroyed the town.

The town is mostly known for the long resistance of its inhabitants against the French troops under Joseph Bonaparte who, in 1806–1807, attempted to conquer its castle.

In July 1810, three British warships, the frigate HMS Thames, HMS Weazel, and Pilot, captured or destroyed a convoy of 31 coasting vessels that were carrying stores and provisions from Naples to Murat's army at Scylla. Seven large gunboats, four scampavias and an armed pinnace protected the convoy. At the approach of the British warships the convoy and its escorts beached themselves in front of Amantea, but the British were still able to capture almost all the vessels, and destroy half a dozen, all while suffering only minimal casualties.

== Main sights ==
- The Rocca (Castle). First built by the Byzantines, it was strengthened by the Arabs. The current cylindrical tower is however to the Norman-Hohenstaufen age. It was long besieged by Charles of Anjou's troops in 1269. It was nearly destroyed during the French siege in 1806-1807. It is now a public structure, but is abandoned.
- Church of San Bernardino.
- Palazzo delle Clarisse (17th century). The palace was built in the early seventeenth century as the Convent of the Poor Claires (Clarisse) and has remained a convent until 1806 when the French, as a result of the siege of Amantea, confiscated it along with other church properties and then sold it to the Marquis de Luca di Lizzano who made it his noble residence. The Marquis De Luca lived in the palace until 1977. Following a period of severe neglect and decay, the building was then purchased and restored by the current owner, Prof. Fausto Perri. The Palazzo delle Clarisse now hosts cultural and commercial activities such as concerts, exhibitions and paintings by the masters of the Atelier of Copyists, a highly specialized Italian laboratory as well as a restaurant.
- Palazzo Mirabelli (17th century).
- U Turriune (large tower, 14th century) at Campora San Giovanni.
- Archaeological findings in the area of Campora San Giovanni.
- Capuchins Church.

== Culture ==
=== Music ===
The city's first musical ensemble, "Concerto Bandistico Città di Amantea "Mario Aloe", was established in 1850 by the Municipality under the direction of Maestro Achille Longo. From 1927 to 1965 this band was directed by Maestro Mario Aloe, to whom the band was later named.

In 1987, "Banda Musicale Francesco Curcio" was founded by Maestro Francesco Curcio and initially dedicated to Achille Longo.

Another local musical group is "Orchestra dei Fiati Mediterranea City of Amantea", founded on 10 May 2005 by 50 young instrumentalists led by Maestro Angelo De Paola.

=== Traditional cuisine ===
Amantea is known for its typical dessert, Buccunotto, a boat-shaped sweet filled with chocolate, spices and other ingredients that traditionally remain secret among the housewives and pastry shops that produce it. In addition, the processing of fish is also very important, such as: anchovies, sardines and the newborn fishes called "rosamarina", which are prepared by local companies and individuals scrupulously following the recipes handed down by the old fishermen.

=== Events ===
- Carnival;
- Amantean medical days;
- Chess game with live figures;
- "Premio letterario Città di Amantea", created by Vitaliano Camarca in 1962;
- "Amanteans in the World Day";
- La Guarimba International Film Festival;
- "La Fiera", which takes place annually from late October to early November.

== See also ==
- List of Catholic dioceses in Italy
- Amantea Castle
- Church of San Bernardino da Siena (Amantea)
- Siege of Amantea

== Sources ==
- Lorelli, Alfonso (2009). Amantea nel XX secolo. Catanzaro: Rubettino.
