= List of municipalities of the Province of Catanzaro =

The following is a list of the 80 municipalities (comuni) of the Province of Catanzaro in the region of Calabria in Italy.

== List ==
Municipality	Population (2026)	Area (km²)	Density
Albi	739	29.64	24.9
Amaroni	1,595	9.88	161.4
Amato	769	20.93	36.7
Andali	581	17.87	32.5
Argusto	400	6.88	58.1
Badolato	2,829	37.07	76.3
Belcastro	1,211	53.56	22.6
Borgia	7,185	42.38	169.5
Botricello	5,022	15.48	324.4
Caraffa di Catanzaro	1,682	25.05	67.1
Cardinale	1,713	30.12	56.9
Carlopoli	1,303	16.41	79.4
Catanzaro	82,708	112.72	733.7
Cenadi	502	11.92	42.1
Centrache	353	7.96	44.3
Cerva	1,011	21.37	47.3
Chiaravalle Centrale	5,072	23.83	212.8
Cicala	832	9.28	89.7
Conflenti	1,317	29.34	44.9
Cortale	1,802	30.01	60.0
Cropani	4,912	44.81	109.6
Curinga	6,358	52.53	121.0
Davoli	5,679	25.03	226.9
Decollatura	2,817	50.83	55.4
Falerna	4,013	24.04	166.9
Feroleto Antico	1,931	22.38	86.3
Fossato Serralta	527	11.85	44.5
Gagliato	411	7.04	58.4
Gasperina	1,860	6.78	274.3
Gimigliano	2,895	33.55	86.3
Girifalco	5,401	43.08	125.4
Gizzeria	5,389	37.19	144.9
Guardavalle	4,004	60.27	66.4
Isca sullo Ionio	1,480	23.56	62.8
Jacurso	512	21.20	24.2
Lamezia Terme	67,005	162.43	412.5
Magisano	1,042	31.94	32.6
Maida	4,465	58.34	76.5
Marcedusa	354	15.68	22.6
Marcellinara	2,148	20.91	102.7
Martirano	784	14.90	52.6
Martirano Lombardo	923	19.84	46.5
Miglierina	671	13.94	48.1
Montauro	1,930	11.74	164.4
Montepaone	5,890	16.85	349.6
Motta Santa Lucia	818	26.30	31.1
Nocera Terinese	4,773	46.58	102.5
Olivadi	481	7.17	67.1
Palermiti	1,036	18.38	56.4
Pentone	1,791	12.38	144.7
Petrizzi	988	21.90	45.1
Petronà	2,313	45.79	50.5
Pianopoli	2,572	24.65	104.3
Platania	1,965	26.84	73.2
San Floro	691	18.32	37.7
San Mango d'Aquino	1,384	6.89	200.9
San Pietro a Maida	3,810	16.45	231.6
San Pietro Apostolo	1,533	11.72	130.8
San Sostene	1,407	32.49	43.3
San Vito sullo Ionio	1,536	17.17	89.5
Sant'Andrea Apostolo dello Ionio	1,691	21.43	78.9
Santa Caterina dello Ionio	1,918	40.69	47.1
Satriano	3,371	21.16	159.3
Sellia	452	12.81	35.3
Sellia Marina	7,798	41.46	188.1
Serrastretta	2,878	41.65	69.1
Sersale	4,087	53.30	76.7
Settingiano	3,292	14.35	229.4
Simeri Crichi	4,689	46.74	100.3
Sorbo San Basile	708	59.28	11.9
Soverato	8,409	7.79	1,079.5
Soveria Mannelli	2,733	20.50	133.3
Soveria Simeri	1,413	22.28	63.4
Squillace	3,600	34.33	104.9
Stalettì	2,394	12.11	197.7
Taverna	2,465	132.31	18.6
Tiriolo	3,461	29.26	118.3
Torre di Ruggiero	933	25.37	36.8
Vallefiorita	1,430	13.88	103.0
Zagarise	1,313	49.33	26.6

== See also ==
- List of municipalities of Calabria
- List of municipalities of Italy
