= Railway accidents in New South Wales =

Incidents in the Australian state

The railways of New South Wales, Australia have had many incidents and accidents since their formation in 1831. There are close to 1000 names associated with rail-related deaths in NSW on the walls of the Australian Railway Monument in Werris Creek. Those killed were all employees of various NSW railways. The details below include deaths of employees and the general public.

== Accidents involving loss of life ==
=== Locomotive No. 1, 1858 ===
This locomotive, built in 1855 by Robert Stephenson with three others for the first real railway line in New South Wales, was involved in two fatal accidents. The first occurred as a derailment on 10 July 1858. The locomotive was pulling two open third-class carriages, a first- and a second-class carriage between Sydney and Parramatta. Near Homebush, the two third-class compartments left the rails and toppled down an embankment. There were thirty people in the two carriages, of whom two were killed, one a solicitor, the other a market gardener. In the ensuing investigation, reported in the Sydney Morning Herald, it was suggested that the problem was caused by damage to the hollow-cast rails which were not able to withstand the weight of the locomotive. Rail workers, some of whom witnessed the derailment, claimed that the problem was caused, at least in part, by the practice of loose-coupling the lightweight third-class carriages in the same way as heavy goods trucks. The matter also drew to the attention of the managers the fact that the price of first class travel, at four shillings, was so exorbitant that even the wealthiest citizens of Sydney chose to travel in the open carriages.

=== Newtown collision, 1868 ===
On 6 January 1868, a man was killed when Locomotive No. 1 collided with a passenger train at Newtown station. The locomotive was severely damaged and retired. It is now on display at the Powerhouse Museum. Newtown station was at that time located west of the present station, its platform eventually forming part of the foundation of Crago's Flour Mill.

=== Emu Plains collision, 1878 ===
On the night of 30 January 1878, head-on collision between two goods trains. One of the drivers (Michael Stephenson) survived and the other driver and the firemen of both trains together with a guard riding in the cab of the up train, were killed. The primitive system of working the trains was found to be responsible.

=== Currabubula train accident, 1878 ===
On the night of 28 May 1878, the coupling on a ballast carriage between the trucks and train failed. There were two fatalities, and at least one other injured. An inquest held on 5 June 1878 at Murrurundi cleared all persons of negligence.

=== Salt Clay Creek railway disaster, 1885 ===
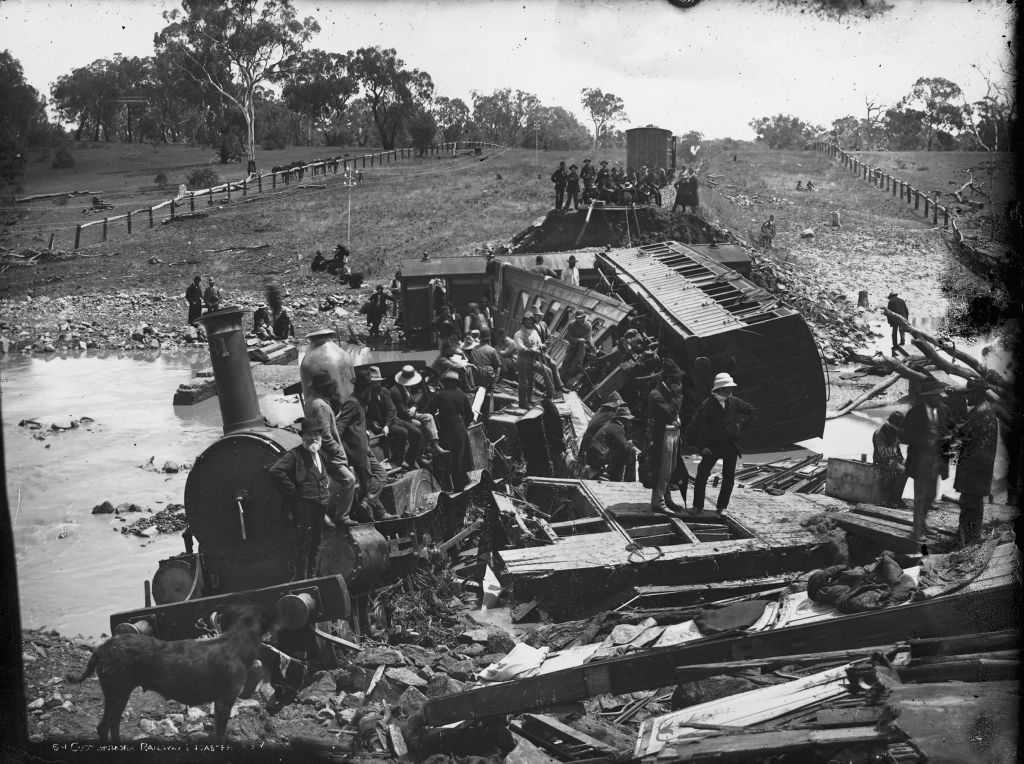
Cootamundra train crash.

On 25 January 1885, the Melbourne-Sydney mail train derailed between Bethungra and Cootamundra, killing seven and injuring over 20. The cause was a washaway of a culvert over Salt Clay Creek during a period of heavy rainfall.

=== Peats Ferry, 1887 ===
On 21 June 1887, an excursion train from Sydney ran out of control down the steep Cowan Bank. There were two other trains full of holidaymakers standing at the platforms at Hawkesbury River station and disaster was only averted by the alert station master who could hear the roaring engine and frantic whistling. He dispatched a railway porter to throw the points lever open and divert the runaway down a siding that led to the new bridge site. The train lost speed along the railway causeway out to Long Island and collided with some empty wagons. The locomotive slid off the embankment and ended up partially submerged in the river. The engine driver was trapped in the cabin and drowned but the fireman escaped. The toll was six dead and seventy injured.

=== Bathurst accident, 1890 ===
On 25 April 1890, an Up mixed train, after shunting at Kelso, climbed the 1 in 50 grade to Raglan where it again stopped to unload parcels as well as pick and set down passengers. The drawbar between the third and fourth vehicles broke, releasing the bulk of the train which commenced to run back down the hill, there being no continuous air-brake throughout the train. The runaway vehicles ran all the way down the grade, across the Macquarie River railway bridge and into Bathurst yard where they collided with the following goods train. Four passengers in the rear of the Mixed train were killed and three others injured.

=== Tarana, 1892 ===
On 27 April 1892, eight passengers were killed by a derailment of the rear carriages of a western-bound mail train caused by a broken rail.

=== Redfern rail collision, 1894 ===
On 31 October 1894, the 9.31 am, six carriage local train travelling from Strathfield was approaching the terminus at Redfern. As the train reached the signalbox, it was hit without warning by the 9.30 am train bound for Goulburn, which departed against a stop signal. The Goulburn bound train was only travelling at an estimated 10 kilometres per hour, however the accident was devastating in terms of damage, injury and loss of life. Steam and hot cinders killed 13 passengers, including Edward Lloyd Jones, the chairman of David Jones, and twenty seven were injured.

=== Orton Park, Bathurst, 1898 ===
On 4 June 1898, the 1:50 am No. 29 down train departed Bathurst. As it passed Orton Park the driver, Mr. Sargeant, became aware that it had run over something. He reported the matter on arrival at George's Plains, by telephone to Bathurst. Mr. Rains, the Night Stationmaster, sent the shunting engine and shunters Mayo and Musgrave to find out what the something was. Shunter Musgrave returned at 2:50 am to report that they had found the mangled, headless remains of a man. Constable Brennan went out by the No. 61 down mail to assist in the search, for body parts, and take charge of the remains. Some time elapsed before the head was discovered some distance from the body. The remains were then taken to the Bathurst Hospital. Although formal identification took some time, due to disfigurement from the accident, the body was initially identified as Herbert Thomas Smith, a 38-year-old Bathurst carpenter, from the contribution book of the Oddfellows Lodge, that was on the body. From the marks observed on the front of the engine, it was supposed that Mr. Smith was on his feet and became confused as the train approached. After being hit he then fell across the line and was literally cut to pieces. Death would have been instantaneous. He was returning from a job in Rockley and it is thought he chose to walk on the line as the track was too muddy due to recent rain. A subsequent Inquest found that the deceased had come to his death by being accidentally run over by a train and exonerated the driver from all blame.

=== Sydenham derailment, 1901 ===
Seven people were killed, including the fireman, and twenty six injured when a steam locomotive and two passenger cars derailed just south of Sydenham station.

The withdrawal of the F-class steam locomotives from passenger service was the result of this derailment. The train involved was the 5:55 pm from Sydney, bound for Hurstville. Shortly after passing Sydenham Junction, the engine suddenly left the rails, shot off the track to the left in the vicinity of the level crossing at Bridge Street, collided with and smashed the crossing gate and signal post and travelled some distance down Bridge Street before coming to a stand.

=== Lithgow Zig-Zag, 1908 ===
On 8 December 1908, a locomotive hauling a Sydney-bound stalled on the 1 in 30 gradient near the Clarence tunnel. The engine-driver decided to divide the train. Unfortunately the engineman's mate did not release the air in the brakes. The second portion of the trained rolled downwards. The train's guard fell from his guard van and was injured. However, the guard of a stationary goods train that the runaway wagons ran into was killed.

=== Ardglen Tunnel, 1909 ===
On 27 November 1909, the fireman on engine T727 was scalded to death by escaping steam spewed from its funnel in the Ardglen Tunnel, between Werris Creek and Murrurundi.

=== Brooklyn, 1913 ===
On 8 October 1913 at around 10:00 pm, a migrant who was employed as a packer on the railway, was run over by a north-bound train and killed. The body, which was terribly mutilated, was not found till about 6.00am the following morning (9th).

=== Exeter, 1914 ===
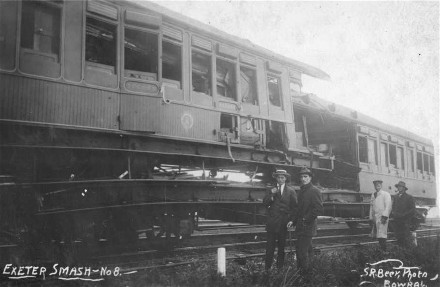
Exeter, 1914

On 13 March 1914, fourteen passengers killed and thirty-two injured when the Temora mail train crashed into a stationary train.

=== Moss Vale, 1914 ===
On 12 May 1914, one killed and five injured in the vicinity of Bong Bong Bridge when an express goods train from Goulburn crashed into the rail trolley on which they were travelling.

=== Yass accident, 1916 ===
On 6 May 1916, a driver was accidentally killed by a train at Yass Junction Railway Station.

=== Hurstville train disaster, 1920 ===
On 30 August 1920, five people were killed when a train shunted into the back of a locomotive at Hurstville station.

=== Aberdeen accident, 1926 ===
Derailment of Brisbane Express caused by faulty track and collapse of flood openings by washaways. Five people were killed and 39 injured.

=== Murulla train accident, 1926 ===
On 13 September 1926, a collision at Murulla. The collision resulted in the death of 26 persons.(Gunn has 27 fatalities.)

=== Eastwood, 1940 ===
An engine driver was killed in similar circumstance to the Eastwood, 1948 accident detailed below.

=== Brooklyn, 1944 ===
Total of sixteen were killed and at least four others critically injured following a collision on 15 January 1944 between the Tamworth mail train and a bus at a level crossing a short distance from Hawkesbury River station. The engine of the train struck the bus, which contained 21 passengers.

=== Central, 1947 ===
On 24 December 1947, a man was struck and killed by a train at Central station.

=== Sefton, 1947 ===
On 24 December 1947, a man was struck and killed by a train near Sefton station probably whilst crossing the line to visit his daughter's home.

=== Redfern, 1947 ===
On 25 December 1947, a man collapsed and fell in front of a train. The man was killed.

=== Bundanoon/Tallong, 1947 ===
On 23 December 1947, an army private, Bryan Williams (18), was killed on the roof of a train a result of his head striking an overhead bridge.

=== Rocky Ponds (Harden), 1948 ===
On 30 June 1948, four persons were killed and 19 injured when the crowded South-West mail train plunged down a 9-metre (30 feet). embankment near Harden, about 370 km (230 miles) south of Sydney, just before 5 am.

=== Sodwalls, 1950 ===
On 3 April 1950, a railway fireman was killed and the driver seriously injured when a petrol tanker on a derailed train blew up. The explosion happened when a railway embankment, weakened by heavy rain, collapsed, and the locomotive, with several trucks, plunged into a 30 ft deep cavity near Bathurst. The train was travelling between Tarana and Sodwalls at about 10 pm. It was pulling trucks carrying oil, timber, and at least one petrol tanker.

=== Berala train collision, 1952 ===
On 7 May 1952 in conditions of heavy fog, a fully laden passenger train ran into the rear of a stationary passenger train at Berala station. A crowded eight-car suburban train from Liverpool to Sydney was standing in the station at Berala when a second, equally crowded train from Bankstown ran into the rear (in heavy fog conditions) killing 10 people and injuring 140. Four of the carriages of the Liverpool train were telescoped into each other, with the dead being in the last two. The crash was so severe it was heard 4.5 km away. A belated commemoration service was held 50 years later.

The Bankstown train had tripped past a train stop at red, in accordance with the rules.

=== Sydenham rail disaster, 1953 ===
On 19 December 1953, five people were killed and 748 injured when a Bankstown-bound train crashed into the rear of an East Hills train at Sydenham station. A signal electrician was manipulating a failed track circuit relay, but was distracted and forgot to release the track circuit when the train passed, causing a wrong side failure and the collision.

=== Robertson, 1962 ===
On 4 August 1962, a driver (Treharne) was killed when three 44 class locomotives (4432, 4434 and 4439) in a runaway train smashed into a stationary goods train at Robertson.

=== Liverpool, 1962 ===
On the evening of 12 July 1962, a goods train hauled by two diesel locomotives crashed into the rear of a passenger train on a viaduct south of Liverpool station. Two men, a guard and a signalman, were killed and seven injured.

=== Liverpool train collision, 1965 ===
On 31 October 1965, a freight train collided with a stationary electric passenger train waiting to depart Liverpool station in Sydney's south western suburbs. One person was killed and four people were injured. The cause was the driver of the freight train having fallen asleep.

=== Kempsey, 1968 ===
On 9 December 1968, the North Coast Daylight Express collided with a school bus at the Middleton St level crossing in Kempsey. Four schoolgirls were killed and 17 people were injured including 15 children.

A further two of the injured schoolgirls died in the days following the incident.

=== Borenore train collision, 1970 ===
On 31 July 1970, the Silver City Comet passenger express had a head-on collision with a stationary Indian Pacific train at Borenore, near Orange. The driver of the Comet and an elderly female passenger were killed, with at least twenty injured.

=== Heathcote train collision, 1970 ===
On 29 October 1970, three people were killed when a rail motor collided into the rear of a stationary goods train.

=== Robertson, 1972 ===
On 6 May 1972, a head-on collision between locomotives 4525 and 4462 at Robertson resulted in the death of a railway fireman who was set alight by blazing diesel oil. A driver was charged with manslaughter.

=== Dunheved, 1972 ===
On 18 May 1972, at the munitions factory crossing St Mary's, there was a railway accident that resulted in the death of a Federal Police Officer. The vehicle he was travelling in was struck by the train whilst the man was on his way to work at the factory sentry post.

=== Mellilee, 1974 ===
On 26 October 1974, there was a head-on collision between two goods trains. The collision derailed fourteen carriages. A train fireman, injured in the collision subsequently died.

=== Gunnedah, 1975 ===
On 13 May 1975, the driver of the Northern Tablelands Express and a railways inspector were killed when the train ploughed into a semi-trailer on a level crossing near Gunnedah.

=== Glenbrook, 1976 ===
On 16 January 1976, one man died and ten others were badly injured when a heavily laden goods train ploughed into the rear of a four-car passenger train 500 metres short of Glenbrook station.

=== Granville railway disaster, 1977 ===
On 18 January 1977, electric locomotive 4620, while hauling an 8-car train travelling from the Blue Mountains to Sydney, derailed at Granville, hitting a row of supports of an overhead road bridge, causing the bridge to collapse on to two passenger cars of the derailed train. 83 people died and more than 200 were badly injured in this accident, which has become Australia's worst-ever railway disaster.

=== Burbong, 1979 ===
On 21 March 1979, a woman was killed and her son injured in a level-crossing accident near Queanbeyan.

=== Valley Heights train collision, 1982 ===
On 18 July 1982, there was a collision between a moving empty wheat train and the previous empty coal train which was stationary at Valley Heights station. The collision took place in the early hours around 2 am. There was a risk of explosion from the leakage of gas from two cylinders in the brake van. The driver of the wheat train was killed. The guard of the coal train was only slightly injured, even though the brake van in which he was travelling was reduced to splinters.

=== South Windsor, 1984 ===
On 13 February 1984, a train driver was killed when a train hit a semi-trailer. The train's guard was seriously injured.

=== Cowan, 1984 ===
On 28 April 1984, the driver of a suburban train was crushed to death when it ploughed into the rear of a goods train 1 km from Cowan station. Four passengers were injured.

=== Between Bell and Hartley Vale stations, 1987 ===
On 25 May 1987, one worker was killed when a Sydney bound freight train collided with an excavator.

=== Springwood, 1987 ===
On 15 August 1987, two workers were killed and one worker and one passenger injured when a passenger train collided with a mobile crane on the down main track 500 m east of Springwood station.

=== Wentworthville train derailment, 1989 ===
On 27 December 1989, an eight car Tangara electric passenger train travelling west to Emu Plains became derailed just to the east of the station. Three of the eight carriages derailed, the rear car D6127 being destroyed by the impact with the platform and another, N5127 being condemned some months later. It was CityRail's first major Tangara accident. A 41-year-old male passenger who had to be cut from the wreckage of the rear car died later that day in Westmead Hospital.

=== (Brooklyn) Cowan Bank train disaster, 1990 ===
On 6 May 1990, an electric interurban train travelling south between Newcastle and Sydney collided into the back of a chartered heritage tourist train, killing six and injuring 99 people. The heritage train (led by steam locomotive 3801) had stalled on the Cowan Bank, and dropped sand onto the track to increase traction resulting in a wrong side signal failure. Four fatalities resulted when the rear carriage of the heritage train was crushed by the impact from the electric interurban train. The driver and one passenger in the electric train were also killed. An interim ban was placed on heritage train operation in New South Wales following this disaster.

=== Muswellbrook, 1998 ===
On 9 August 1998, two rail maintenance workers, 31 and 50 years, were killed when an empty coal train rounded a sharp curve at 70 kilometres per hour (43 mph) and smashed into their truck, picking it up & spinning it into a cliff face. A third man who was on the tracks managed to leap to safety before the collision. The workers were part of 3 crews carrying out maintenance work on the Sandy Hollow-Ulan line near Muswellbrook. About 7 am the maintenance trucks were travelling along a gorge area beside the line when workers in the last truck noticed the train approaching and tried to warn the truck in the middle. Two of the crew from the middle truck had left the cabin, one closing a gate & the other picking up rocks from the line, leaving 2 men in the truck. The collision threw the men from the cabin and dragged debris 100m down the line. Despite the workers in the other trucks waving at them, the truck had insufficient time to move. The train driver, a guard and 2 workers were taken by the Westpac Rescue Helicopter to Newcastle for counselling. Rail Services Australia, employers of the victims, announced an investigation into the fatal crash. The investigation would focus on why both the maintenance crew and coal train were on the tracks at the same time and why no warning was given.

=== Robertson, 1998 ===
On 19 May 1998, two train drivers died when their freight train derailed near Robertson. The train they were driving was 1BY4 Brisbane to Whyalla Steel Train headed by NR3, NR26 and NR57. At 05:30 in the pouring rain and heavy fog, the abutments of a recently replaced road overbridge collapsed onto the tracks. The leading locomotive derailed onto its side and the roof was ripped off by the abutments of the new bridge. The train then pushed the locomotive into a mound of mud before coming to a rest.

=== Glenbrook train disaster, 1999 ===
On 2 December 1999, an interurban passenger train collided with the rear of the Indian Pacific long-distance passenger train waiting at a failed signal, resulting in seven fatalities.

=== Waterfall train disaster, 2003 ===
On 31 January 2003, a driver of a southbound interurban electric Tangara passenger train, G7, travelling from Sydney to Wollongong suffered a heart attack, causing the train to derail at high speed south of Waterfall station, resulting in seven fatalities and multiple injuries.

=== Albury, 2006 ===
On 5 June 2006, an XPT train was involved in an accident with a sedan driven into its path at an active level crossing.

=== Ariah Park, 2006 ===
On 15 April 2006, a rail safety worker was killed in a shunting accident on a Heritage train at Ariah Park.

=== Back Creek, 2007 ===
At approximately 18:30 on Saturday 10 March 2007, a semi trailer loaded with hay bales and a hay baler drove into the path of empty grain train 3835 at the Tallabung to Back Creek Road level crossing. The semi trailer driver was killed in the collision. The train derailed and, with the crushed semi trailer underneath the leading locomotive, travelled 144 metres further onto and over the timber and concrete rail bridge over the Back Creek watercourse. The leading locomotive came to a rest off the track on the embankment past the bridge; the other two locomotives came to rest on the bridge. The wreckage caught fire following the collision, ultimately destroying all three locomotives, the bridge superstructure and the semi trailer. The train crew, although injured, were able to exit the leading locomotive and escape from the fire. The investigation found that the semi trailer driver drove into the path of the train without stopping at the level crossing's 'Stop' sign.

=== Newbridge (near Bathurst), 2010 ===
On 5 May 2010 at 11:16 am, an excavator driver was killed when an XPT (WT27) service collided with his excavator. The man was part of a crew engaged in trackwork that did not obtain necessary track possessions before proceeding to cut up spare rails by the track, and was subsequently hit from behind by the XPT on a blind curve at 69 kilometres per hour. When the XPT collided with the excavator, the excavator was propelled along the track for about 20 m before the extended boom struck a utility vehicle parked on the southern side of the track. The excavator and utility vehicle were then pushed off the track and came to rest about 38 m from the point of initial impact.

=== Central, 2016 ===
On 10 August 2016, an elderly woman died 15 days after sustaining injuries falling down the carriage steps of a V set as it was shunted into another train. The train had just returned from Newcastle and she was getting off the train, having allowed other passengers to leave before her.

=== Tempe, 2017 ===
A man was hit and killed by a train after he ran onto the tracks at Tempe railway station on 9 August 2017.

=== Oatley, 2018 ===
On 22 April 2018, a boy escaped from his carers and was hit and killed by a train at Oatley. The boy had been missing since approximately 8:20 pm the previous Sunday, with hundreds of Oatley residents helping to look for him. His body was found early that morning.

=== Riverwood, 2018 ===
At approximately some time before 14:50 on 5 September 2018, a man was struck and killed by a train at Riverwood railway station. He was on the tracks when he was killed and it is possible he was on the tracks with a friend spraying graffiti on a stationary train on the opposite track.

=== Berowra, 2024 ===
Around midnight on 2 February 2024, a man in his 30s and a woman in her 20s were struck by a freight train at Berowra railway station, after having an argument on the platform. The male victim allegedly threw an item on the tracks belonging to the woman, who then went to retrieve the item. After seeing an oncoming train, the male victim went down to help the woman, however both were struck and died on the scene.

=== Carlton, 2024 ===
On 20 July 2024, a father and one of his daughters were killed by an oncoming train at Carlton railway station. This occurred after a pram containing the father's twin daughters fell onto the tracks. The father was killed while trying to rescue them, while the other daughter was unharmed.

== Accidents involving injuries only ==
=== Blandford, 1908 ===
On 10 March 1908, the North-West mail train travelling from Moree to Sydney. Two carriages derailed. A female passenger sustained injuries.

=== Picton Lakes (Couridjah), 1911 ===
On 31 October 1911, there was a collision between the Sydney–Melbourne Mail express and a stock train. Nine passengers reported minor injuries.

=== Hawkesbury River, 1925 ===
In June 1925 A northbound goods train lost its brakes heading down Cowan Bank and ran into a stationary light engine stopped at Hawkesbury River station.

=== Riverstone, 1939 ===
On Sunday 17 December 1939, a goods train collided with a passenger train at Riverstone on the Richmond line. Both engines and two carriages were thrown off the line and the permanent way was torn up for several yards. The train crews jumped from the locomotives when they saw that the collision was inevitable; the only man injured was Hilton Lynch, the fireman. The passengers were uninjured, although the collision was heard a considerable distance away.

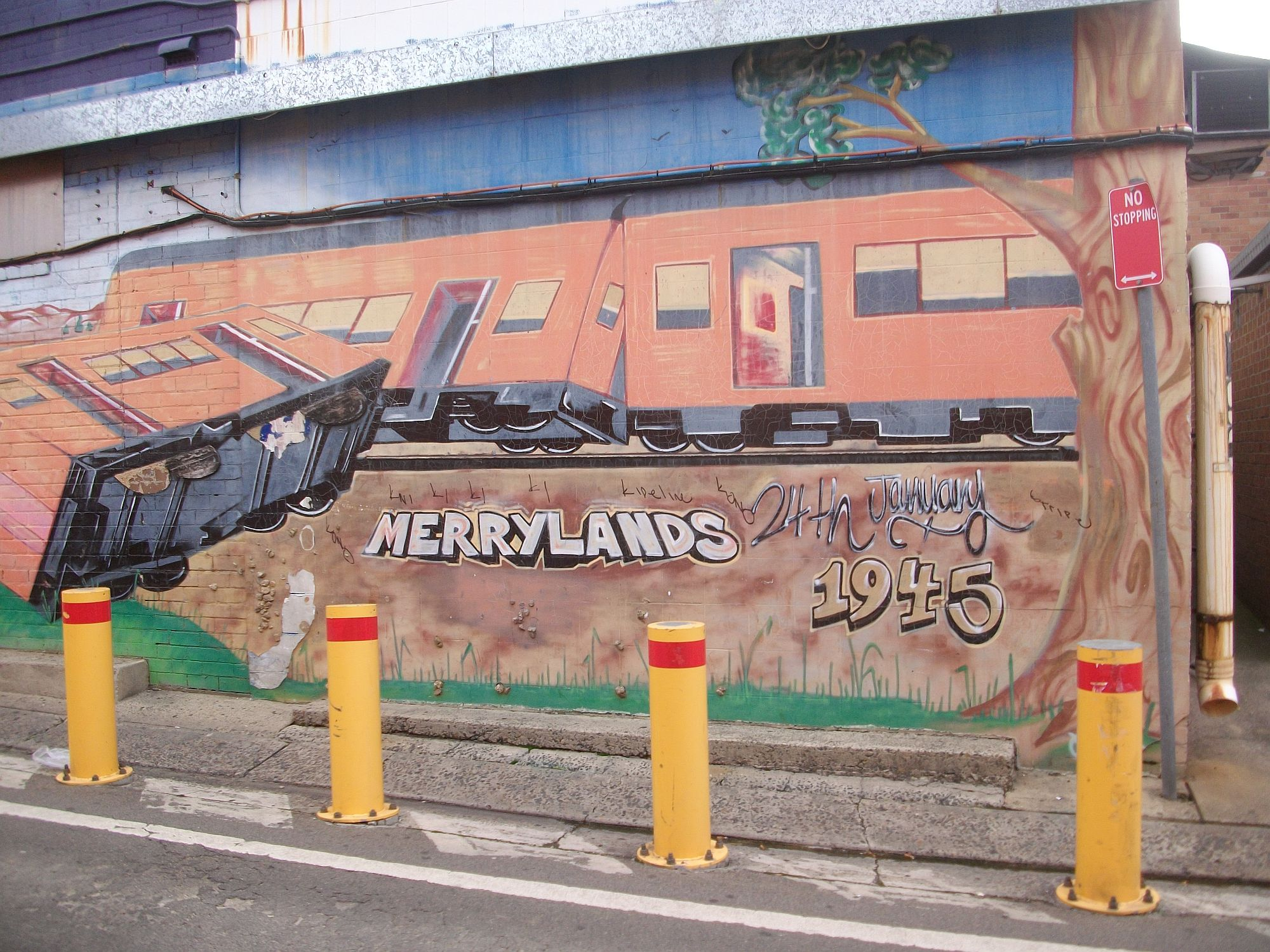
A community mural commemorating the 1945 accident in Merrylands

=== Merrylands, 1945 ===
On 24 January 1945, an electric passenger train travelling from Liverpool to the city jumped the track on the bend approaching Merrylands railway station, causing the first four carriages to derail. The lead carriage flipped and spun, ripping open the following three carriages. The lead car slid along the tracks for 40 yards (approximately 36.5 metres), tearing up the rail lines in both directions, and fell down an embankment. The accident also caused electrical and telephone lines to be brought down. The driver, John Baldock, and 12 passengers were injured. A 7-inch (nearly 18 cm) bolt placed on the track was attributed to have caused the derailment.

=== Rookwood, 1946 ===
At about 7.45 am on 19 November 1946, the front two carriages of the 7.08 Liverpool to Wynyard service jumped the points and diverted onto the Sydney Abattoirs branch line, near Rookwood station. Both carriages derailed, and the second car began to topple, but hit a steel stanchion, which was bent into the "shape of a boomerang" by the impact. Somehow the stanchion held and prevented the carriage from falling over completely. Of the approximately 600 passengers on board, only two were immediately taken to hospital with injuries. Another five female passengers, who worked together at a Flemington spinning mill factory, were later transferred to hospital after they all collapsed at work.

=== Eastwood, 1948 ===
On 25 June 1948, the crew of the early morning coast milk train were slightly injured when their locomotive overran a stop signal at exit points and derailed.

=== Between Hawkesbury River and Cowan Stations, 1948 ===
On 11 June 1948, 100 people were injured when two express trains bound for Sydney collided.

=== Roseville Collision, 1950 ===
Three trains collided between Roseville and Lindfield stations on 28 July 1950.

On the morning of 28 July, there was a serious dislocation of train traffic caused by the overhead power wiring fouling the down and up lines at Auburn, resulting in a complete recast of the affected electric services. To provide a reasonable service on the North Shore line, trains were transposed at Central, resulting in delays to trains and causing trains to catch up to those in front. A down electric commuter train "tripped" past a signal showing stop at the down end of Roseville platform into the section occupied by the preceding train. After recharging the brake air supply, the driver proceeded at above a cautious speed (40 mph rather than 15 mph) and came into violent collision with the train ahead. At the same time an up train was passing and hit the emergency brakes but came into contact with the telescoped cars of the initial collision, tearing the sides of that train away. There were no cases of serious injury to passengers on the three trains. The collision resulted in 3 carriages telescoping into the length of 1 carriage and remarkably only 10 passengers were taken to hospital.

The subsequent inquiry placed the blame on the train driver, Francis Barrett. Barrett testified before the inquiry that his eyes had left the track due to an uncontrollable fit of coughing.

An initial inquiry put the blame for the accident on a faulty train-stop trip brake equipment, but this was misleading.

=== Maldon, 1952 ===
At 6.30 am on 7 May 1952, two goods trains collided with each other 100 yards from Maldon station, located between Picton and Douglas Park Stations in the Southern Highlands. One of the drivers was seriously injured and taken to Camden Hospital.

=== Lochinvar, 1959 ===
On 19 August 1959, the North-West Mail ploughed into the rear of an almost stationary goods train. The fireman and driver of the mail train were injured.

=== Geurie, 1963 ===
On 23 August 1963, nineteen passengers were injured when the Sydney-bound Bourke Mail train when it collided with the front end of a goods train fouling the main line.

=== Wentworth Falls, 1965 ===
On 16 July 1965, two crew of a goods train were injured in a runaway train that derailed.

=== Robertson, 1965 ===
On 25 December 1965, an Up Freight train collided with a standing freight train. The moving freight train (Loco 4407)was traveling in an up direction entering the loop at Robertson station and coming out the other end and thus colliding with the stationary 45 class locomotive (Loco 4539) carrying freight in a down direction.

=== Bellata, 1968 ===
On 20 April 1968, five men were injured when two goods trains collided head-on.

=== Riverstone, 1972 ===
On 5 February 1972, four people were injured when the front carriage of a two-car motor train left the rails and plunged down a 10 ft embankment.

=== Gosford, 1982 ===
On 11 January 1982, over twenty people were injured when an engine collided with a passenger train at the station.

=== Summer Hill, 1982 ===
On 19 March 1982, thirty-nine people were injured when two trains collided.

=== St Marys, 1983 ===
On 3 March 1983, twenty-four people were injured when a train derailed near St Marys station.

=== Lithgow, 1993 ===
On 22 July 1993, the driver of an empty inter-urban electric passenger train was injured after his train ploughed into two stationary electric locomotives.

=== Beresfield Rail Collision, 1997 ===
On 23 October 1997, a coal train collided into the rear of another coal train standing on the same track at Beresfield station in the Hunter Valley. The cause was a failure to stop at a signal. Six people were injured including the station master and a commuter who jumped from the platform moments before the collision. The crash resulted in dozens of coal-wagons tumbling over the platform and across the tracks, closing all four tracks of the Main Northern line and a virtual demolition of Beresfield station.

=== Concord West derailment, 1998 ===
On 9 June 1998, a Tangara passenger train on a southbound movement in the early hours of the morning derailed between Concord West and North Strathfield stations ending up partially in a local street, and almost completely blocking all North and Southbound rail lines. The cause was excessive train speed by the driver as he passed over points switching the train to a relief line at mainline speed. It was found that the Driver had insufficient warning of the turnout due to previously radioed information and very close signals. The driver did not get a radio message he was going through on the main line he assumed he was because on some mornings it didn't do the rail clean. The lead car, D6114, was subsequently scrapped, though all other cars remained in service.

=== Hornsby derailment, 1999 ===
On 9 July 1999, four cars of an eight-car electric passenger train were derailed when it was incorrectly diverted into a siding, causing the train to hit a gravel embankment and become entangled in power lines. Three passengers were taken to hospital with minor injuries.

=== Blue Mountains train fire, 2000 ===
On 25 July 2000, a westbound interurban electric passenger train caught fire requiring the evacuation of the train and the hospitalisation of six people. The cause was thought to be an electrical fault in the roof of the leading carriage.

=== Kingsgrove derailment, 2000 ===
On 6 October 2000, an eight car Tangara train derailed at low speed near Kingsgrove station on the East Hills line, causing the rear three carriages to topple onto its side. The cause was a track twist as a result of very high temperatures. Ten people were hospitalised.

=== Hexham derailment and crash, 2002 ===
On 12 July 2002, a coal train derailed at the Newcastle suburb of Hexham due to a points failure. A signalman closed two of the four tracks at the site to traffic, however a passenger train on one of the adjacent pair of tracks continued onwards to collide with the derailed coal wagons, injuring eight people. The cause was found to be a breakdown in communication between train and signalling staff.

=== Sefton Junction derailment, 2007 ===
In the early hours of the morning of 17 January 2007, two diesel locomotives hauling a Melbourne to Brisbane freight train derailed at Sefton junction in the western suburbs of Sydney. Diesel fuel was spilt from the leading locomotive. Following the derailment, the accident crane used to lift the leading locomotive (a QR National CLP class), toppled over trapping the crane driver, who was hospitalised after rescue by NSW Fire Brigades.

=== Homebush derailment, 2009 ===
In January, a train headed for Bankstown overshot the platform at Homebush, passed the signal at stop and derailed on the catchpoints. One passenger was injured climbing the stairs to exit the station. The investigation found that the SPAD and subsequent derailment was a consequence of an error by the Driver who misinterpreted which signal applied to his line. The Driver was relatively inexperienced and it is probable that his driving and situational awareness were adversely affected by fatigue brought on by insufficient quality rest and sleep. It was also found that the position of the two signals, ST265L and S261S, increased the probability of a driver misinterpreting which signal applied to the line. Associated with the Signal ST 265L were two safety features: the first, a train stop which automatically applied the brakes as the train passed the signal without authority (this reduction in speed as the train derailed mitigated the consequences of the SPAD) and the second, catch-points associated with the signal operated correctly and derailed the train away from the adjacent line. However, the position in the track layout of these two safety devices resulted in the derailed train stopping foul of the adjacent line. It was also found that the formation and ballast adjacent to the catch-points was sufficient to stop the train turning onto its side but not sufficient to stop it tilting to a 10-degree angle.

=== Blue Mountains derailment, 2010 ===
On 4 February, at approximately 4:30 PM a four-car V Set Intercity passenger train derailed between Woodford and Linden stations after hitting debris from a landslide. The wheels of the front-most bogie derailed after colliding with the debris before the train came to a stop. The 200 passengers aboard were evacuated and no injuries were recorded. CityRail was forced to cancel all trains on the Blue Mountains Line.

=== Newbridge, 2010 ===
At about 11:13 am on 5 May 2010, XPT passenger train WT27, travelling from Sydney to Orange, New South Wales collided with a track-mounted excavator on the main line between Bathurst and Newbridge. The XPT was travelling at about 69 km/h at the time of the collision. The excavator and a utility vehicle were severely damaged; the leading power car of the train received moderate damage. The operator of the track-mounted excavator was fatally injured and one train passenger incurred minor injuries.

=== Zig Zag, 2011 ===
At 1:30 pm on 1 April 2011, a Zig Zag Railway maintenance vehicle (the Hi-Rail), collided with a two-car Rail Motor on the No 1 Viaduct, Top Road, between Clarence and Top Points stations. The Hi-Rail, with a Driver and Passenger on board, was freewheeling down the hill in reverse in the section from Clarence towards Top Points. The Rail Motor, operated by a Driver, was travelling empty in the opposite direction from Top Points. The Rail Motor Driver saw the approaching vehicle and applied the brakes. However, the two persons on board the Hi-Rail, facing the opposite direction, did not see the Rail Motor before the collision. The force of the collision compacted the body of the Hi-Rail such that neither cab door would open. The two occupants of the Hi-Rail were injured in the collision and were assisted out of the Hi-Rail and onto the Rail Motor by the Rail Motor Driver who was uninjured. The force of the collision caused a minor misalignment of the track. The investigation established that the collision resulted from the Driver of the Rail Motor and the Driver of the Hi-Rail not being aware that they were travelling towards each other on the same track in the Top Points-Clarence section. This lack of situational awareness resulted from procedural errors. The Rail Motor Driver departed Top Points without communicating his intention to his Guard or the Hi-Rail crew, and the Rail Motor Guard exceeded his authority by authorising the Hi-Rail to leave a worksite and proceed to Top Points. A number of other factors were found to have contributed to the collision, particularly a lack of radio communications and operational safeworking errors. Other safety issues identified during the investigation included delayed notification of the accident; poor maintenance of Train Register Books; passengers travelling in the Rail Motor driver's cab; Rail Motor Driver's fatigue; and excess speed of the Hi-Rail.

=== Pymble, 2011 ===
On 16 November 2011, a 95-year-old man was rescued from the wreckage of his car after driving it onto train tracks on Sydney's north shore. Firefighters worked for almost an hour to remove the man, who veered off Beechworth Road in Pymble and landed 10 metres down an embankment on the train tracks. He was taken to hospital with minor injuries.

=== Coralville, 2016 ===
On 21 April 2016, a woman drove through a level crossing, colliding with a northbound goods train. The mother and her three daughters were injured and taken to hospital.

=== Richmond, 2018 ===
On 22 January 2018, a Waratah A set train A42 crashed into the buffer stop at the end of Richmond station's Platform 2. 16 people were injured, the most serious being a fractured leg on a 22-year-old man.

=== Bomen, 2021 ===
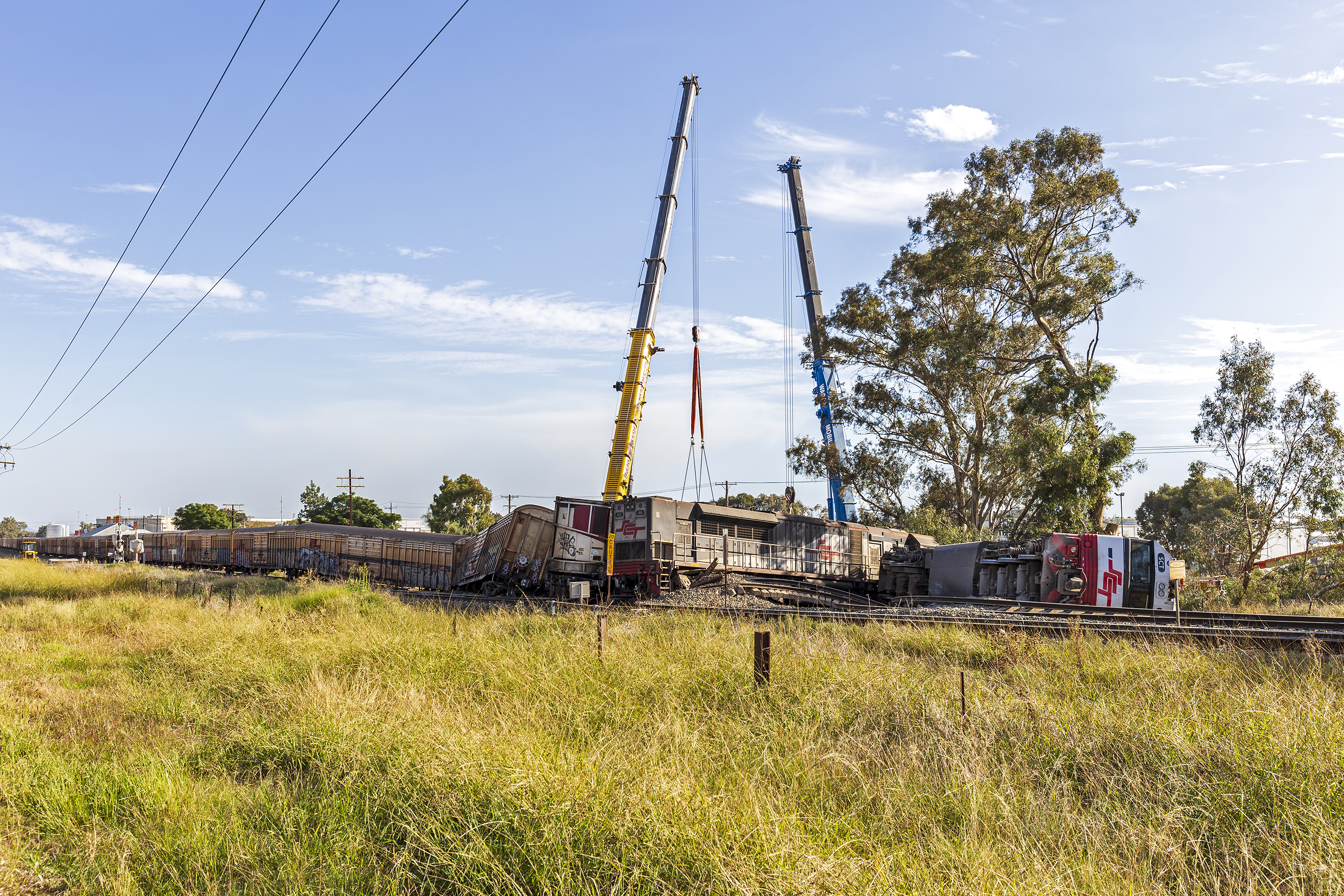
Derailed locomotives and carriages at Bomen

At 2:30am AEST on 15 April 2021, a SCT Logistics freight train carrying non-dangerous general goods derailed in Bomen on the Main Southern line. Two locomotives and five carriages derailed, with the leading locomotive tripping onto its side, causing extensive damage to the tracks. Two crew members were treated for minor injuries.

=== Scone, 2021 ===
Just after 7:00am AEST on 29 September 2021, a truck collided with a coal train at a level crossing near Scone. The truck driver was rushed to hospital in serious condition, and the train driver was unharmed.

=== Kembla Grange, 2021 ===
On 20 October 2021 at approximately 4:09am, AEDT Tangara T Set T42 was travelling to Waterfall from Kiama. There were 9 people on board. An abandoned car was left on the tracks. The train collided with it and derailed, leaving 1 car overturned and the other 3 cars on the track. 4 people, including 2 passengers, the guard and the driver were taken to hospital.

A 47-year-old man was charged for causing the derailment on 27 October 2021. (Allegedly) he had stole a minivan, using it to steal a go-kart before driving the van onto the tracks and fleeing the scene.

== Other accidents ==
=== Springwood, 1923 ===
On 20 May 1923, 26 trucks carrying cement and coal ran off the tracks, along with the engine, after running away downhill.

=== Lindfield, 1929 ===
On 14 August 1929, there was a collision involving electric trains. The North Shore line had only just been electrified in 1928.

=== Redfern Stables, 1957 ===
Garratt class locomotive driven into turntable pit, resulting in disruption to services for days while cranes were brought in to remove the loco.

=== Jannali, 1956 ===
On 17 April 1956, early in the afternoon a Goods Train drawn by two diesel locomotives rounded a bend on a steep down-grade at slow speed and ten trucks jumped the line. The impact of the derailment hurled the heavy trucks 20 feet in the air, severing the overhead electric wires. The careering trucks tore up 50 yards of line and the other rail line was pushed 2 feet out of alignment for hundreds of yards.

=== Robertson, 1965 ===
On 25 December 1965, engine 4407 hauling freight collided head-on with a freight train standing at Robertson (hauled by 4539?).

=== Central, 1966 ===
On 25 January 1966, a derailed electric train carriage brought down a powerline stanchion at Central Station.

=== Red Hill, Coffs Harbour, 1974 ===
On 11 May 1974, a southbound freight train derailed when it collided with a "wall of red clay mud, rocks, trees and branches sealing off the exit of the tunnel". Driver and fireman exited through windows of the 44 class locomotive.

=== St Marys, 1977 ===
On 11 July 1977, a carriage was derailed on as Blue Mountains train, a kilometre west of St Marys Station. There were 600 passengers on the train but no one was hurt.

=== Springwood, 1987 ===
Interurban electric train derailed by vandals placing rocks on the track just west of Springwood, causing the leading two cars to end up in a local resident's front yard on Macquarie Rd, Springwood on 29 September 1987.

=== Waterfall collision, 1994 ===
On 20 December 1994 two S set electric trains collided in the early hours of the morning during a shunting procedure at Waterfall station in the south of Sydney. Both trains were empty of passengers. Carriages jack-knifed in spectacular fashion onto the platform causing demolition of a concrete ramp and part of the station canopy.

=== Unanderra, 2003 ===
The derailing of two locomotives on 28 June 2003.

=== Birrong, 2007 ===
The derailing of two trains on 17 January 2007.

=== Exeter, 2010 ===
At about 1856 on 24 January 2010, a loaded freight train designated 2224, travelling from Medway Junction to Berrima Junction, derailed one bogie on the second-last wagon at Exeter, NSW.

=== Yass Junction, 2010 ===
At about 0153 on 9 December 2010, an Up (northbound) loaded grain train travelling from Barellan, New South Wales (NSW) to Maldon, NSW and numbered as 3234, collided at low speed with the rear of another Up (northbound) loaded grain train, numbered as 8922, on the Down2 Main line at Yass Junction, NSW. The intended operation had been for both trains to wait, one behind the other, on the Down Main line at Yass Junction to enable a third northbound goods train, 4MB2, to pass them both on the adjacent Up Main line.

=== Kaleentha/Menindee, 2011 ===
At about 1545 on Wednesday 13 July 2011, freight train 3SP7 collided with a road-rail vehicle in the Kaleentha to Menindee section of track, located in western New South Wales (NSW). The road-rail vehicle, a Toyota Landcruiser station wagon, was extensively damaged. The lead locomotive of train 3SP7, NR4 incurred only minor damage and after effecting repairs at the incident site the train continued through to Port Augusta en route to Perth. There were no injuries and no damage to fixed infrastructure.

=== Wirrinya, 2011 ===
Initial reports indicate that at about 0545 on 23 October 2011 train 7SP5, travelling on the interstate main rail line, derailed at Wirrinya NSW. No person was injured but there was significant damage to rolling stock and infrastructure.

=== Mittagong, 2011 ===
On 6 November 2011, a passenger train derailed near Mittagong in the New South Wales Southern Highlands after hitting an abandoned ute which was left on the railway track after becoming bogged there. The northbound train was carrying nine passengers and three crew, but no one was hurt.

=== Coalcliff, 2011 ===
On 24 November 2011, the commuter and freight rail line was thrown into chaos when a coal train derailed near Coalcliff and forced the closure of the only line between Thirroul and Waterfall. The Office of Transport Safety Investigations found that the cause of the derailment was a broken axle. The investigation revealed that the barrel of the No. 3 axle of the eighth position wagon had broken and parted, causing both wheels to derail. As a result, seven wagons following this wagon derailed. The two locomotives and all other wagons remained on the track. Although there were no injuries as a result of the derailment, approximately 470 metres of damaged track needed to be replaced. The investigation established that the break in the axle was attributable to the propagation of metal fatigue at the site of the fracture. The fatigue fracture was initiated some time prior to the final complete failure of the axle at the derailment site but, due to damage sustained in the derailment, the initiator of the fracture could not be determined.

=== Granville, 2014 ===
On 30 September 2014, an empty passenger train caught fire near Granville station at around 7:00 pm. The incident resulted in the partial closure of the T2 line between Cabramatta and Granville, causing major disruptions to passengers. The train driver and guard had to be rescued by the fire service. No injuries were reported.

=== Cardiff, 2016 ===
At about 5:00 am on 4 April 2016, a Pacific National freight train with three NR classes leading, caught fire at Cardiff from the failure of bolts securing an oil filter tank allowed oil to escape and come in contact with hot engine components. A passing passenger train was blocked from passing the burning locomotive with commuters having to depart from the train and find alternate transport. The fire was extinguished at least three hours after it was first reported.

=== Telarah, 2018 ===
On 18 January 2018 a freight train derailed at the station on track 2; no one was injured.

=== Coffs Harbour, 2021 ===
On 25 February 2021, a Pacific National container train derailed due to a flood. Fire and Rescue NSW said about half of the 1500-metre train had been derailed, with one locomotive toppling into a paddock. Two others remained upright. Sixteen carriages jackknifed and four landed in floodwater. A small fire in one of the carriages was extinguished by the train's driver, who escaped safely.

=== Moss Vale, 2021 ===
On 21 October 2021, a Pacific National freight train derailed on some catch points. 81 class locomotive 8156 was leading the train and collided with a fence after derailing. The derailment resulted in the cancellation of Southern Highlands Line services for over 24 hours.

== See also ==
- List of rail accidents
