= Tiriolo =

- Comune
- Comune di Tiriolo
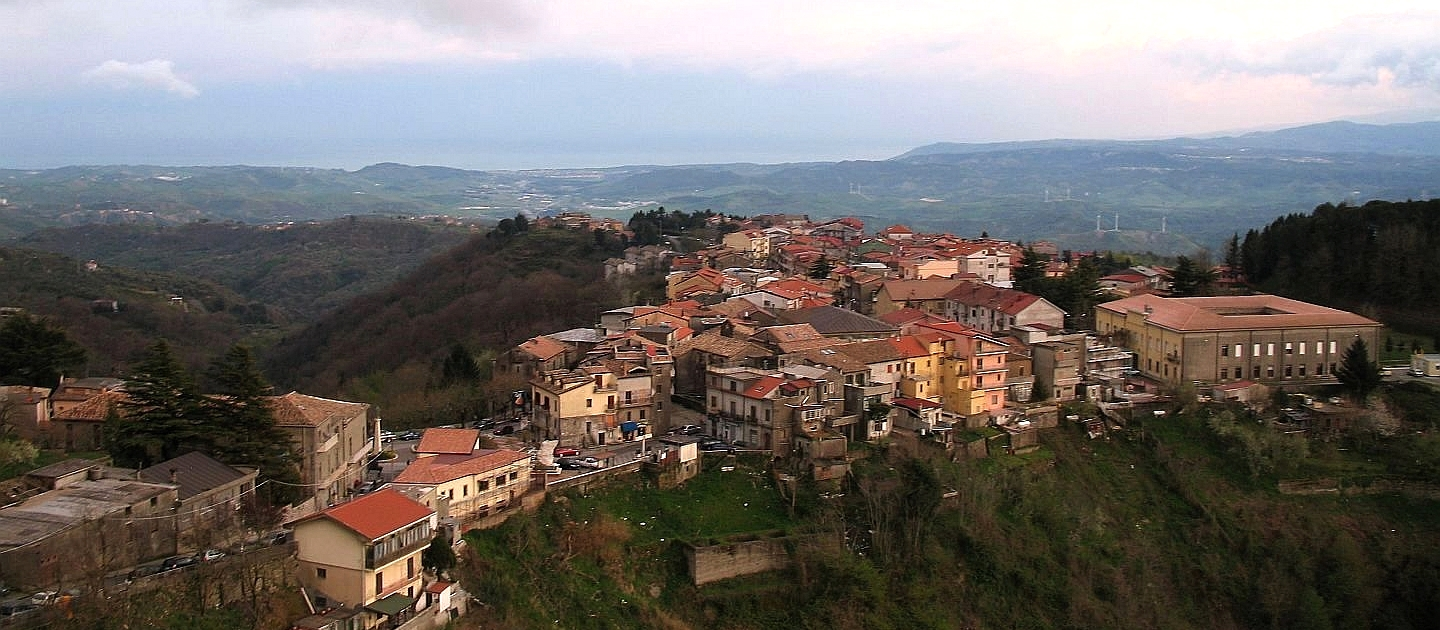
- Tiriolo panorama

- Location within Italy Location within Calabria
- Coordinates: 38°56′45″N 16°30′30″E
- Country: Italy
- Region: Calabria
- Province: Catanzaro (CZ)
- Frazioni: Sarrottino, Pratora, Soluri

Government
  - Mayor: Domenico Stefano Greco

Area
  - Total: 28.98 km^{2} (11.19 sq mi)
- Elevation: 690 m (2,260 ft)

Population (30 September 2012)
  - Total: 3,882
  - Density: 134.0/km^{2} (346.9/sq mi)
- Demonym: Tiriolesi
- Time zone: UTC+1 (CET)
  - Summer (DST): UTC+2 (CEST)
- Postal code: 88056
- Dialing code: 0961
- Website: Official website

Tiriolo is a town and comune in the province of Catanzaro in the Calabria region of southern Italy. It was the birthplace of Renaissance painter Marco Cardisco.

"The houses in the historic center, perched like in a nativity scene, make up the old part of the town, while the new buildings extend along the foot of the hill, nestled between the mountain and the valleys.

Legend traces the origins of the settlement of Tiriolo back to Hellenic people six centuries before the Trojan War or even identifies it with the mythical Scherìa, the happy homeland of the Homeric people of the Phaeacians. Archaeological findings, however, support the hypothesis of the existence of a dwelling nucleus since the Neolithic, as revealed by finds such as polished axes, rudimentary chisels and obsidian scrapers. The subsequent Roman presence finds its most relevant testimony in the famous bronze tablet engraved with a text concerning the Senatus Consultum de Bacchanalibus, a decree of the second century AC, with which the Roman senate prohibited the Bacchanalia, orgiastic rites in which even the elites participated and therefore considers it the context of possible conspiracies against the state. The artefact, found in 1640, is now in the Kunsthistorisches Museum in Vienna, offered in 1727 as a tribute to the Emperor Charles VI of Habsburg."

== Geography ==
The town is bordered by Catanzaro, Gimigliano, Marcellinara, Miglierina, San Pietro Apostolo and Settingiano.

== Gallery ==
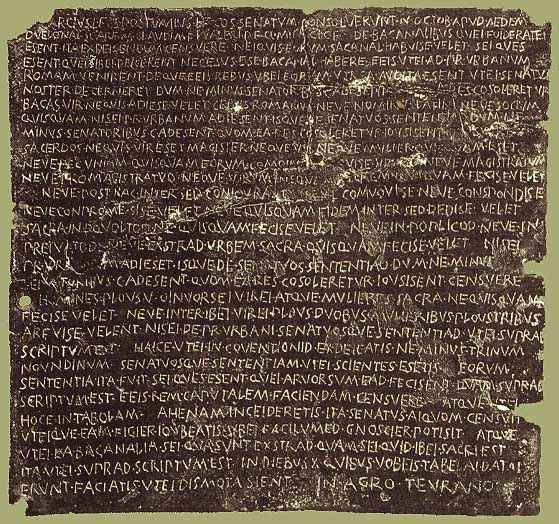
Bronze tablet found 1640 in Tiriolo, now at the Kunsthistorisches Museum, Vienna.
Text shows the Senatus consultum de bacchanalibus, ca. 186 BC
