= San Pietro Apostolo =

- Comune
- Comune di San Pietro Apostolo
- San Pietro Apostolo

- Location within Italy Location within Calabria
- Coordinates: 39°00′15″N 16°28′04″E
- Country: Italy
- Region: Calabria
- Province: Catanzaro (CZ)
- Frazioni: Bivio Zeta, Pasqualazzo, Colicella, Colla

Government
  - Mayor: Raffaele De Santis

Area
  - Total: 11.72 km^{2} (4.53 sq mi)
- Elevation: 780 m (2,560 ft)

Population (2013)
  - Total: 1,720
  - Density: 147/km^{2} (380/sq mi)
- Demonym: Petresi
- Time zone: UTC+1 (CET)
  - Summer (DST): UTC+2 (CEST)
- Postal code: 88040
- Dialing code: 0961
- Patron saint: St. Peter
- Website: Official website

San Pietro Apostolo (Calabrian: San Piatru) is a comune and town in the province of Catanzaro in the Calabria region of Italy. It is about 15.3 kilometres (9.5 mi) northwest of Catanzaro, the provincial capital.

It is surrounded by the villages of Decollatura, Gimigliano, Miglierina, Serrastretta and Tiriolo. The largest nearby town is Nicastro, which has since become part of the larger comune of Lamezia Terme.

== History ==
The town was founded by peasants who fled from Motta Santa Lucia after the earthquake of 1638. Moving to the interior, they asked asylum from Prince Cigala of Tiriolo, who allowed them to settle in the area which is today known as "Colla Pagliara", in exchange for the payment of a modest head tax. They subsequently moved to a lower area which was more sheltered from the wind. The village took name from a small statue of the apostle St. Peter erected in the area.

San Pietro Apostolo was administered by its neighbor Tiriolo until the end of the 18th century when it obtained its autonomy under law No. 14 of 19 January 1807. It was elevated to the status of a comune with the name of 'San Pietro a Tiriolo' and placed under the jurisdiction of what was then called Calabria Ulteriore, which consisted of the current provinces of Catanzaro, Crotone, Reggio Calabria and Vibo Valentia. On 4 May 1811 the comune was given the name of San Pietro Apostolo, attesting its separation from Tiriolo which remained, however, the administrative seat. Law No. 360 of 1 May 1816 transferred the village of San Pietro Apostolo with its 1992 inhabitants from the administration of Tiriolo to that of Gimigliano, and from the province of Calabria Ultra to the new province of Calabria Ultra Seconda (Catanzaro).

Revolutionary Giuseppe Garibaldi stopped here on the night of 28 August 1860. The leader of the Expedition of the Thousand, coming from Maida, was a most welcome guest of the Garibaldi supporter Anselmo Tomaini (already condemned to death by the Bourbons for having been one of the supporters of the movements of Maida and Filadelfia) where, with his closest collaborators, he took note of the situation and planned the forthcoming operations that would have opened the roads to Naples; on the same night Francisco Stocco, with only a few men, induced the surrender of 10,000 men commanded by General Ghio and encamped at Soveria Mannelli, by cleverly having ignited numerous fires placed very visibly on the surrounding heights. Garibaldi's visit is commemorated by two tablets placed on walls of the Tomaini Palace in 1887 and 1961.

San Pietro Apostolo under a blanket of snow

In the course of the 17th century, an important role was played in the economy of San Pietro by the harvesting and processing of gorse (it. 'ginestra'), a fibrous plant that was softened in the Amato river below the village. This provided a fiber which was used by local spinners for the production of cloth. Silkworm breeding was also very common - the worms were fed on white mulberry leaves which were present in the area. The silk thus produced was almost all locally processed and for the most part marketed in Catanzaro, Nicastro and also in the neighboring town of Serrastretta.

== Events ==
The Last Supper from the "Pigliata", San Pietro's passion play.

- "Pigliata" or "Pigghiata", a sacred play representing the passion and death of Jesus Christ, written in prose in 1880 by an anonymous citizen of S. Pietro and produced for the first time on 18 February of the same year. It consists of 5 acts and 52 scenes, lasts about 8 hours and is performed in the small square in front of the Church.
- Feast of San Pietro, celebrated on 29 June
- Feast of Madonna di Carmelo, which begins on 14 July and lasts for three days
- Feast of Madonna della Lettera, celebrated on the last Sunday of September
