= Marco Cardisco =

Italian painter

- Born: c. 1486; Tiriolo, Italy
- Died: c. 1542; Naples, Italy
- Other name: Marco Calabrese
- Education: Polidoro da Caravaggio
- Occupation: Painter
- Movement: Italian Renaissance

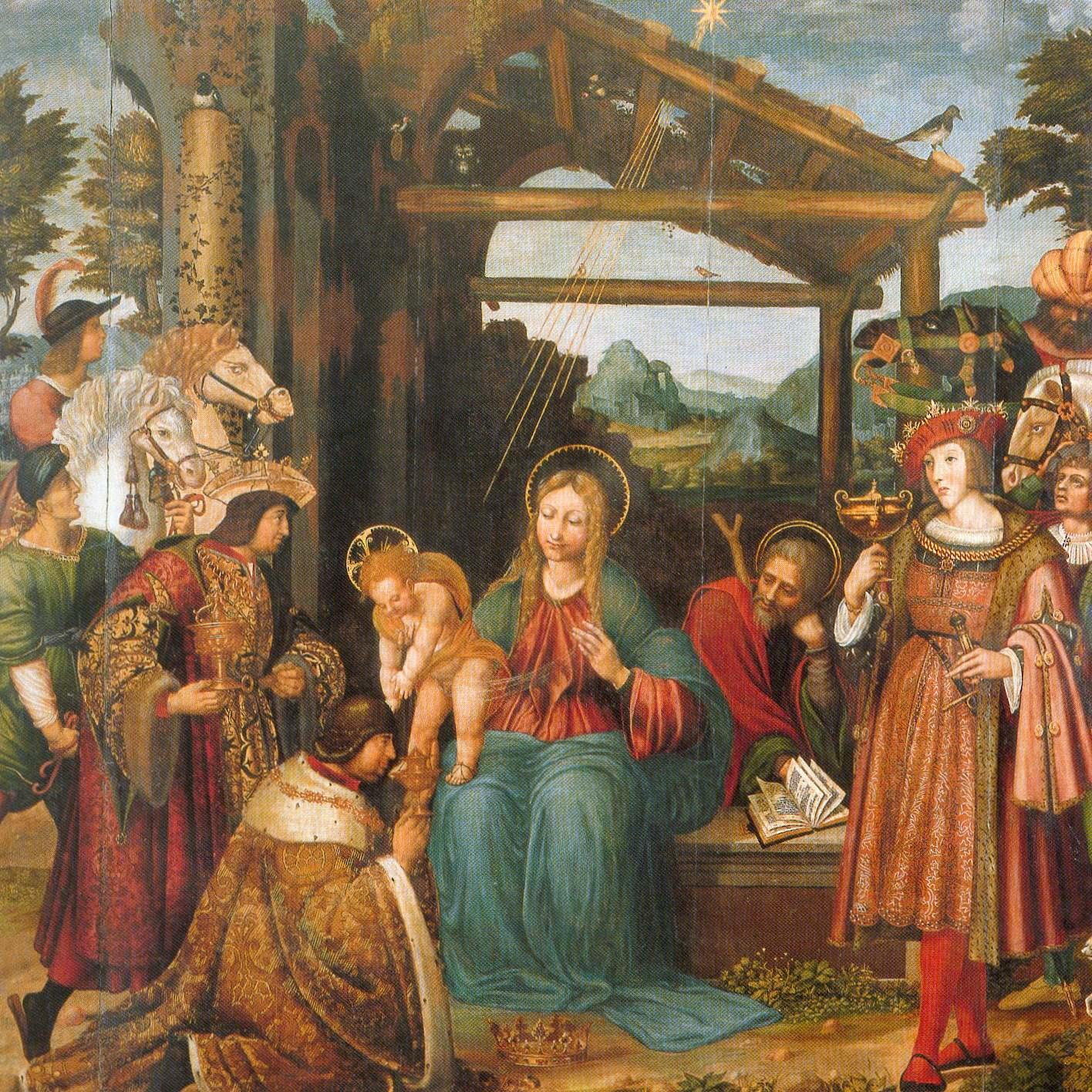
Adoration of the Magi, Museo Civico di Castel Nuovo, Naples

Marco Cardisco, also known as Marco Calabrese, (Born in Tiriolo c. 1486 – c. 1542) was an Italian painter of the Renaissance period, active mainly in Naples during 1508–1542.

== Biography ==
He was a pupil of the painter and decorator Polidoro da Caravaggio, and influenced by Andrea da Salerno. He painted at Sant' Agostino at Aversa. Among his pupils were the painter Pietro Negroni and Giovanni Filippo Crescione. He is also known as Marco Calabrese, because he was born in Calabria.
