= Pianopoli =

- Comune
- Comune di Pianopoli
- Location within Italy Location within Calabria
- Coordinates: 38°57′N 16°23′E
- Country: Italy
- Region: Calabria
- Province: Catanzaro (CZ)
- Frazioni: Amato, Feroleto Antico, Maida, Marcellinara, Serrastretta

Area
  - Total: 24 km^{2} (9.3 sq mi)
- Elevation: 250 m (820 ft)

Population (31 December 2013)
  - Total: 2,585
  - Density: 110/km^{2} (280/sq mi)
- Demonym: Pianopoletani
- Time zone: UTC+1 (CET)
  - Summer (DST): UTC+2 (CEST)
- Postal code: 88040
- Dialing code: 0968
- ISTAT code: 079096
- Patron saint: San Tommaso d'Aquino
- Saint day: 7 March
- Website: Official website

Pianopoli (Calabrian: Chijanopuli) is a small town in the Catanzaro province of Calabria in southern Italy. The population is 2,373 (2000 figure).
