= Settingiano =

Comune in Calabria, Italy

- Comune
- Comune di Settingiano
- Location within Italy Location within Calabria
- Coordinates: 38°54′45″N 16°30′50″E
- Country: Italy
- Region: Calabria
- Province: Catanzaro (CZ)
- Frazioni: Martelletto

Area
  - Total: 14 km^{2} (5.4 sq mi)
- Elevation: 170 m (560 ft)

Population (31 December 2013)
  - Total: 3,076
  - Density: 220/km^{2} (570/sq mi)
- Demonym: Settingianesi
- Time zone: UTC+1 (CET)
  - Summer (DST): UTC+2 (CEST)
- Postal code: 88040
- Dialing code: 0961
- Patron saint: San Martino
- Saint day: 11 November

Settingiano is a town and comune in the province of Catanzaro in Calabria, southern Italy.

== Geography ==
The town is bordered by Caraffa di Catanzaro, Catanzaro, Marcellinara and Tiriolo.
