= Feroleto Antico =

- Comune
- Comune di Feroleto Antico
- Location within Italy Location within Calabria
- Coordinates: 38°57′40″N 16°23′18″E
- Country: Italy
- Region: Calabria
- Province: Catanzaro (CZ)
- Frazioni: Lamezia Terme, Maida, Pianopoli, Serrastretta

Area
  - Total: 21 km^{2} (8.1 sq mi)
- Elevation: 350 m (1,150 ft)

Population (31 December 2013)
  - Total: 2,077
  - Density: 99/km^{2} (260/sq mi)
- Demonym: Feroletani
- Time zone: UTC+1 (CET)
  - Summer (DST): UTC+2 (CEST)
- Postal code: 88040
- Dialing code: 0968
- ISTAT code: 079048
- Patron saint: San Silvestro
- Saint day: 31 December
- Website: Official website

Feroleto Antico (Calabrian: Herulìtu) is a comune and town in the province of Catanzaro in the Calabria region of Italy.

Feroleto Antico is located 280 meters above sea level in a territory predominantly hilly. The highest peak is Mount Mennazzo (749 m). It is crossed by the Badia river for approximately 13 km. The village is located within a small wooded valley. The municipality is located at the narrowest point of Italy, in the Isthmus of Catanzaro, in the center of Calabria. From some of its points is a view of the Gulf of Sant Eufemia.

The town has been hit by various seismic events. The most serious was the earthquake of 28 March 1638, which razed the town to the ground which was subsequently rebuilt. The 1783 Southern Calabria Earthquake and the 1905 Calabria Earthquake were also really serious events and finally in 1905 event, soil fracturing and water leakage (or liquefaction) from the soil were reported.

== Climate ==
Climate data for Fondaco Frustato elevation 62 meters (203.4 feet) (1995-2017)
| Month | Jan | Feb | Mar | Apr | May | Jun | Jul | Aug | Sep | Oct | Nov | Dec | Year |
|---|---|---|---|---|---|---|---|---|---|---|---|---|---|
| Mean daily maximum °C (°F) | 16.0 (60.8) | 16.5 (61.7) | 18.8 (65.8) | 22.4 (72.3) | 26.0 (78.8) | 30.0 (86.0) | 34.2 (93.6) | 35.1 (95.2) | 30.3 (86.5) | 27.3 (81.1) | 22.5 (72.5) | 18.1 (64.6) | 25.1 (77.2) |
| Mean daily minimum °C (°F) | 6.8 (44.2) | 6.5 (43.7) | 7.8 (46.0) | 10.4 (50.7) | 14.0 (57.2) | 17.6 (63.7) | 20.0 (68.0) | 21.3 (70.3) | 19.1 (66.4) | 16.1 (61.0) | 12.5 (54.5) | 9.1 (48.4) | 13.43 (56.17) |
Source: ISPRA

== Transport ==
A railway bridge between here and Marcellinara was washed away by flood waters in 2011.
