= Serrastretta =

- Comune
- Comune di Serrastretta
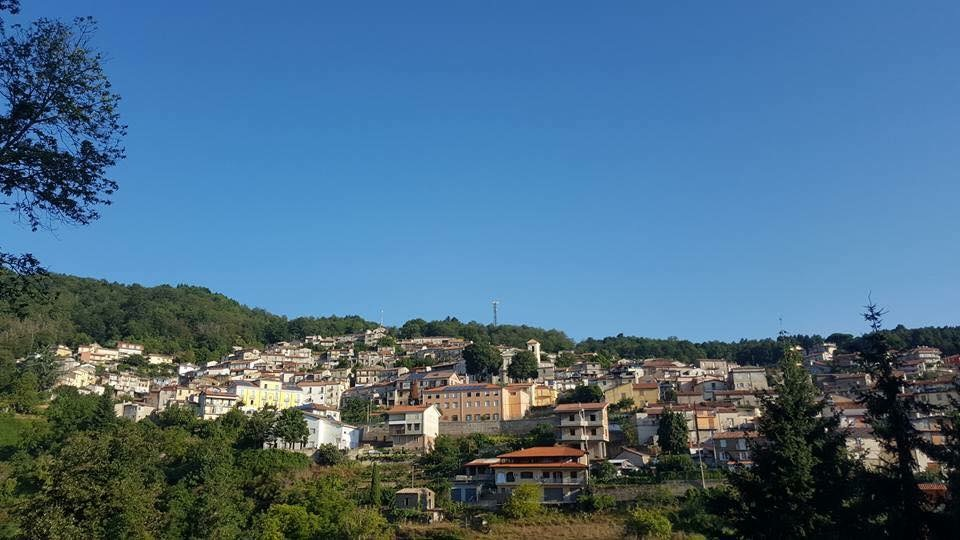

- Location within Italy Location within Calabria
- Coordinates: 39°1′N 16°24′E
- Country: Italy
- Region: Calabria
- Province: Catanzaro (CZ)
- Frazioni: Accaria, Angoli, Migliuso, Cancello, Nocelle, Viterale, Forestella, Polidonti, San Michele

Government
  - Mayor: Felice Maria Molinaro

Area
  - Total: 41.65 km^{2} (16.08 sq mi)
- Elevation: 840 m (2,760 ft)

Population (31 December 2013)
  - Total: 3,207
  - Density: 77.00/km^{2} (199.4/sq mi)
- Demonym: Serrastrettesi
- Time zone: UTC+1 (CET)
  - Summer (DST): UTC+2 (CEST)
- Postal code: 88040
- Dialing code: 0968
- Patron saint: San Gaetano
- Website: Official website

Serrastretta is a town and comune in the province of Catanzaro in the Calabria region of southern Italy.

The town is bordered by Amato, Decollatura, Feroleto Antico, Lamezia Terme, Miglierina, Pianopoli, Platania and San Pietro Apostolo.

== History ==
Serrastretta was founded by Jewish refugees fleeing the Spanish Inquisition and was historically home to a notable Sephardic Jewish community. Even following the expulsion of the Jews from the kingdom of Naples, Serrastretta remained as a large Jewish city, with many Jewish families known to visit the city to engage in Torah study.

Several families of Ukrainian Jewish refugees were invited into the town in 2022, in hope to help restore the remaining Jewish presence in Serrastretta.

The Ner Tamid del Sud shul is the only operating synagogue in Calabria. It was also the first Synagogue in all of Italy to have a female Rabbi, Rabbi Barbara Aiello, as well as the first Synagogue in the country to be affiliated with a Jewish denomination other than Orthodoxy.

== Economy ==
Serrastretta is a center of production of furniture, kitchens, door-frames, casings and furnishings of every kind. Above all are the woven-straw chairs, for which Serrastretta is considered to be one of the main Calabrese producers. The chair makers continue to construct chairs as in the past - a frame made of wood, to which the women expertly apply the woven straw seats with a special bush "vuda", coming from the plants in the marshlands.

In the territory of Serrastretta also porcini mushrooms are found, particularly in areas where chestnut trees grow. There is also a museum devoted to the singer Dalida, whose parents originally came from Serrastretta.
