= Barbara Aiello =

Italian–American female rabbi (born 1947)

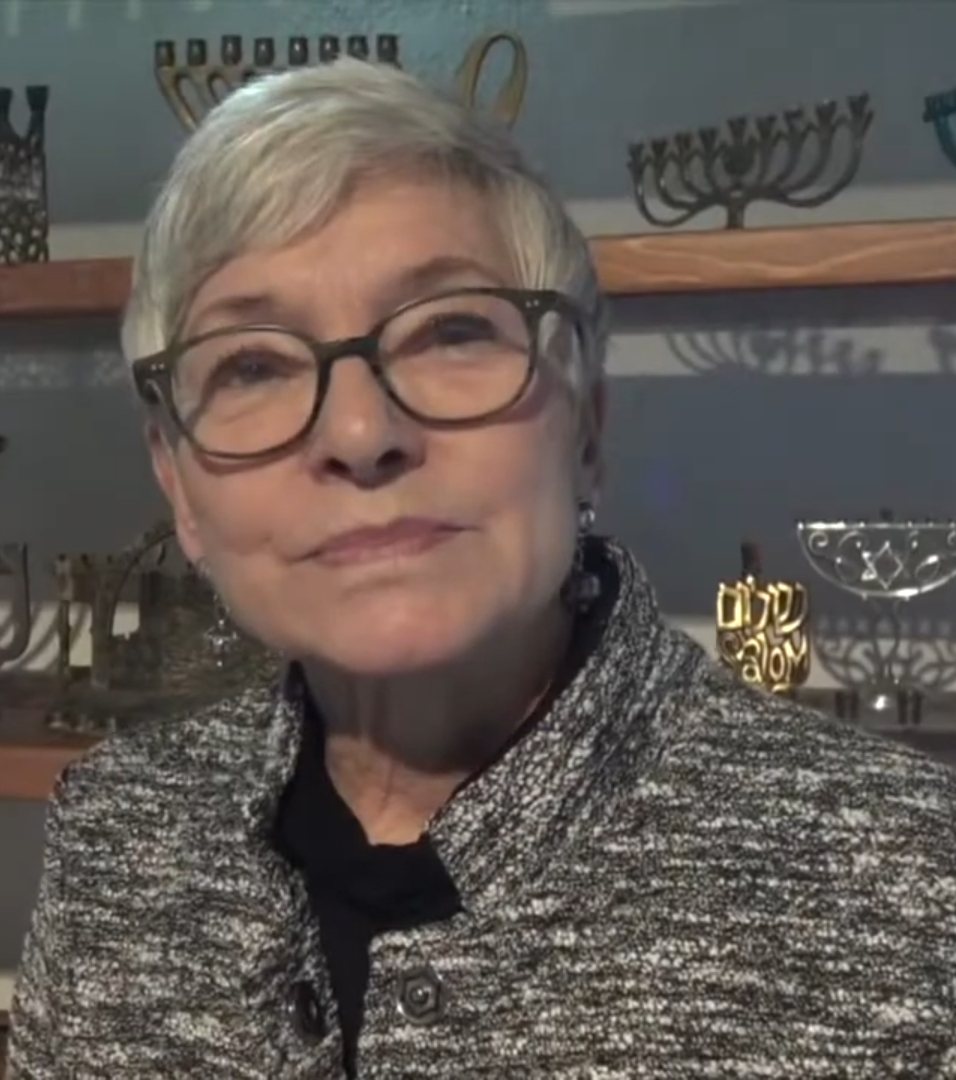
- Aiello on Hanukkah 2019
- Born: November 6, 1947 (age 78); Pittsburgh, Pennsylvania, U.S.
- Occupation: Rabbi
- Website: www.rabbibarbara.com

Rabbi Barbara Aiello (born November 6, 1947) is the first female rabbi in Italy, as well as Italy's first non-Orthodox rabbi. She was born in Pittsburgh to a family of Italian Jewish origin and was ordained at the Rabbinical Seminary International in New York at the age of 51.

In 1977, Aiello created the "Kids on the Block" puppet troupe. In 2005, she conducted the first Passover seder in Sicily since 1492, when the Jews were expelled. She also founded the Italian Jewish Cultural Center of Calabria and Sinagoga Ner Tamid del Sud (which is the first active synagogue in 500 years in Calabria). She initially moved to Milan in 2004, then to Serrastretta in 2006. She credits her familial connections to the Serrastretta region as part of the reasoning for why she was drawn to the region. Aiello's father, Antonio Abramo Aiello, was born in Serrastretta and came to the United States of America in 1923, and she has visited the region several times throughout her life to visit relatives.

"Kids on the Block" was a pioneering effort in helping include children with disabilities into school and society and develop positive attitudes toward children with disabilities. A gifted puppeteer, Aiello created a troupe of children puppets with varying disabilities e.g. using a wheelchair, visually impaired etc. She performed widely in elementary schools.

== See also ==
- Timeline of women rabbis
