= Valigonda rail accident =

2005 train derailment near Valigonda, Hyderabad

Valigonda train accident
- Location of Andhra Pradesh (pre-bifurcation) in India

- Vaaligonda, Telangana Valigonda rail accident (India)

Details
- Date: 29 October 2005; 04:15 AM
- Location: Valigonda, Nalgonda district 80 km (50 mi) east from Hyderabad
- Coordinates: 17.37390837510669°N 78.99938904756124°E
- Country: India
- Line: Pagidipalli–Nallapadu line
- Operator: South Central Railway
- Owner: Indian Railways
- Service: Delta Fast Passenger
- Incident type: Derailment
- Cause: Flash flood

Statistics
- Trains: 1 Delta Fast Passenger
- Vehicles: diesel locomotive WDM-3
- Deaths: 116
- Injured: 200
Route map
Delta Passenger (Kacheguda - Repalle) route map.png

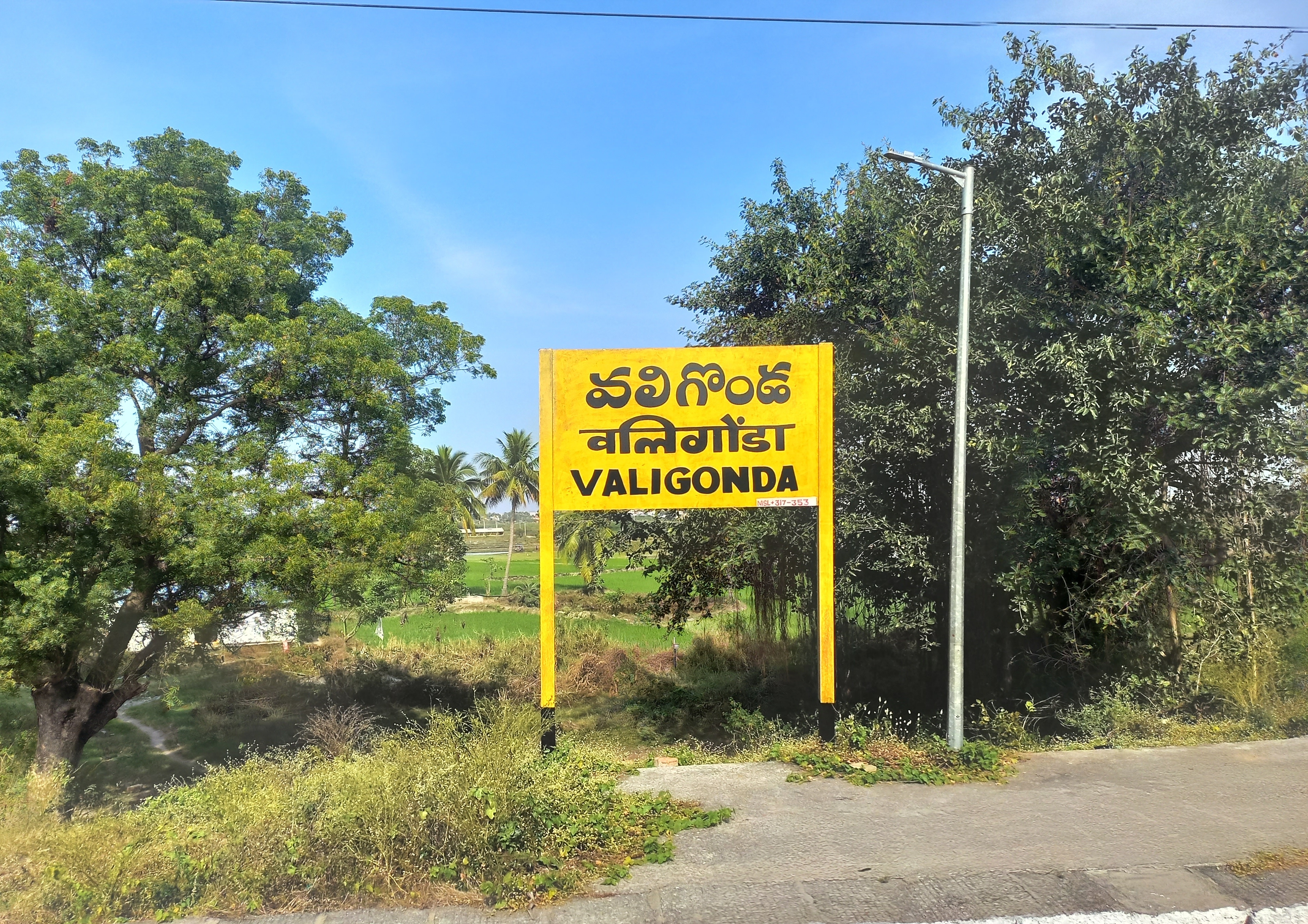
Valigonda railway station name board

The Valigonda rail crash occurred on 29 October 2005 between the Valigonda and Ramannapet stations, about 80 kilometres (50 mi) from Hyderabad in the Indian state of Andhra Pradesh (now located in Telangana). A flash flood swept away a small rail bridge, and a train travelling on it derailed at the broken section of the line, killing at least 116 people and injuring many others. Many people were suspected of being washed away in flooded waters. Initially sources had reported that about 150 persons could have been killed during the incident.

== Accident details ==
Seven bogies along with the engine of Secunderabad bound Delta Fast Passenger derailed due to flash floods washing away a portion of the tracks. The accident occurred early in the morning of 29 October 2005. It was suspected that a huge irrigation tank situated upstream from the rail lines ruptured, sending thousands of gallons of water down the channel, destroying the railway bridge.

Personnel from Indian Army and Indian Navy divers were deployed for rescue services.

The area had been lashed by monsoon rains for several weeks before the accident, which had waterlogged fields and over-filled the irrigation tank, which had ruptured due to unknown factors exacerbated by the heavy rainfall. The flooding had also destroyed several roads, hampering efforts to get emergency personnel to the scene quickly. India's Junior Transport Minister commented that "little could have been done to avoid the accident".

== Similar accidents ==
- 24 December 1953 – Tangiwai disaster – Tangiwai, North Island, New Zealand: the Tangiwai railway bridge over the Whangaehu River collapsed as the overnight express train between Wellington and Auckland passed over it; the bridge supports had been weakened by a lahar a few minutes before the train passed. 151 people were killed. A passerby was not able to warn the train in time. The rebuilt bridge is equipped with high water warning devices.
- (Australia) 1880 – Murrurundi – night mail train derailed at a washaway – 10 killed.
- (Australia) 25 January 1885 – Salt Creek near Cootamundra – night mail train derailed at a washaway – 7 killed.
- 7 August 1904 – Eden, Colorado, United States: Train caught in bridge washout; 97 known dead; 14 missing.
- (United States) 27 September 1923 – near Glenrock, Wyoming – a bridge over Coal Creek was washed away and a passenger train derailed, killing 30 of the train's 66 passengers.
- 8 September 1945 – Llangollen, Denbighshire, Wales: An early morning mail train crashes after the adjacent canal flooded and washed away the track at Sun Bank, killing the driver and causing a fire.
- (Kenya) 1993 – 114 perished in a passenger train which plunged into a river after floods washed away a bridge at Ngai Ndethya.

== See also ==
- List of rail accidents (2000–present)
