= Maldon, New South Wales =

Maldon
- Town
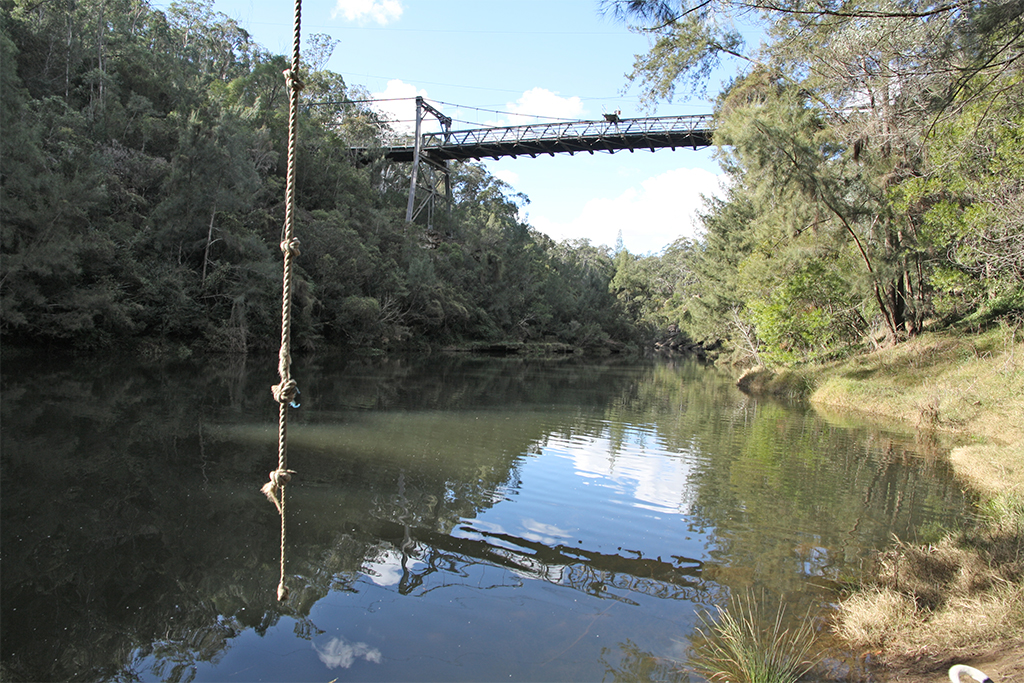
- Maldon Suspension Bridge
- Country: Australia
- State: New South Wales
- Region: Macarthur
- LGA: Wollondilly Shire
- Location: 87 km (54 mi) SW of Sydney; 40 km (25 mi) NE of Mittagong

Government
  - State electorate: Wollondilly
  - Federal division: Hume
- Elevation: 150 m (490 ft)

Population
  - Total: 15 (2016 census)
- Postcode: 2571
Localities around Maldon
Picton	Razorback	Menangle
Picton	Maldon	Douglas Park
Tahmoor	Pheasants Nest	Wilton

Maldon is a locality in the Macarthur Region of New South Wales, Australia, in the Wollondilly Shire. In the 2016 census it had a population of 15.

== History ==
=== Railway ===
A station was established at Maldon, as part of the Great Southern Railway, in 1879. It was originally named Wilton. The station closed in 1976. Maldon is still an active rail location, having turnouts for freight trains bringing limestone to the cement works, and grain to the flour mill.

In 1983, the NSW government commenced construction of an electrified rail link between Maldon and Dombarton (near Wollongong), improving access for coal trains to Port Kembla. The contract for construction of the Avon Tunnel was cancelled in mid-1988: the line was not thought economically viable. An incomplete rail bridge across the Nepean Gorge can be seen just north of the Picton Road bridge.

=== Maldon Suspension Bridge ===
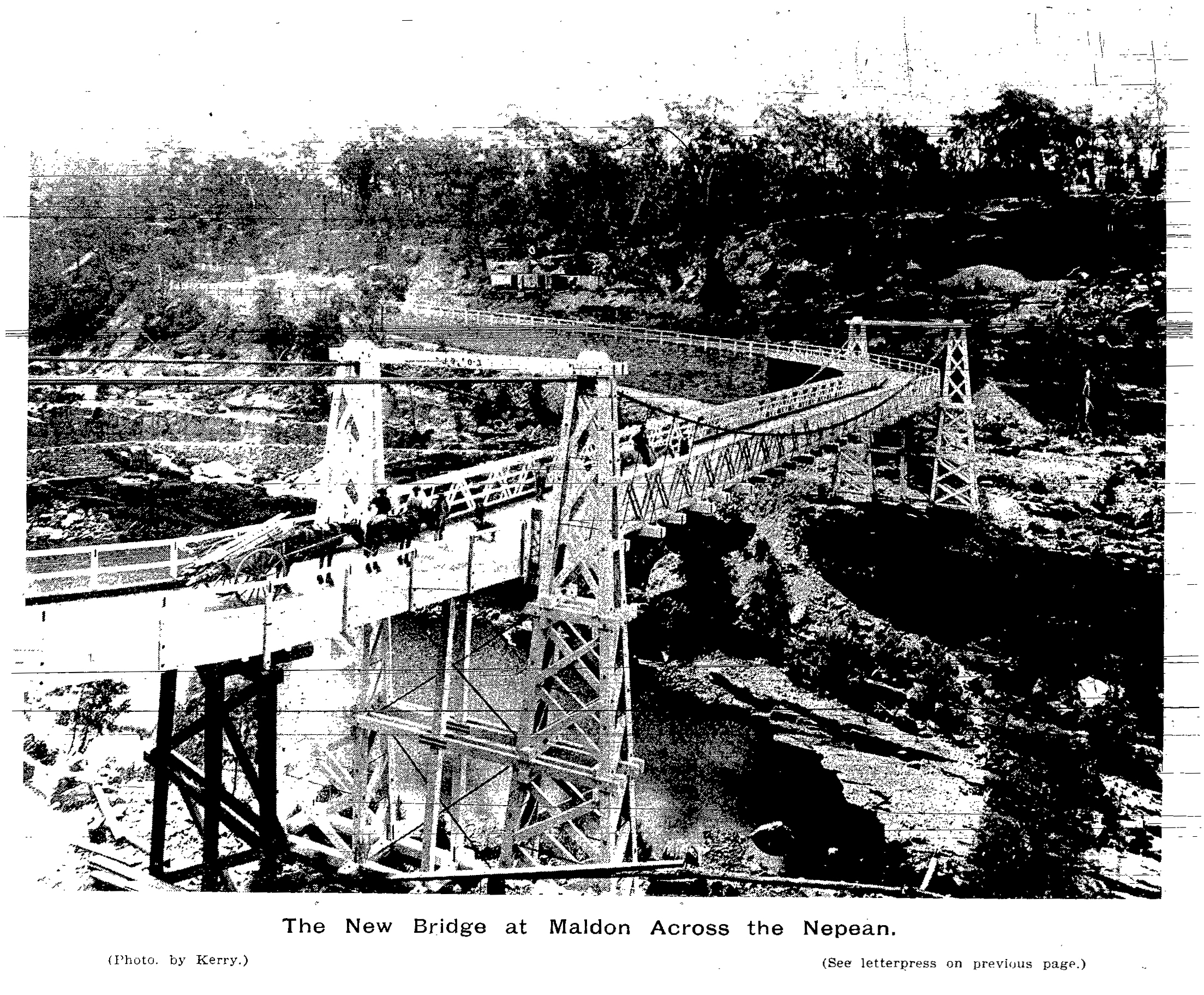
Maldon Bridge 1903

Maldon was also the site of 'Harvey's Crossing', one of two stone causeways over the Upper Nepean River on the Picton - Menangle Road. Stonework supporting the steep approach roads on each side can still be seen. The causeway was replaced by a wooden suspension bridge in 1903, designed by Ernest Macartney de Burgh. By the 1970s, the bridge had become a severe bottleneck, especially with the increasing coal traffic. A deviation of the main road and a concrete beam bridge were constructed further north along the Gorge, and opened in 1980. The Suspension Bridge is now a Heritage item. It is closed to all traffic, including pedestrian.

"The Nepean River, which runs parallel to the Great Southern Railway from Menangle to Picton, is crossed by road at two places only in the whole of the distance - one near Maldon, and the other near Douglas Park Railway Station. Before finally determining upon the position at which the bridge was to be built, due consideration was given to the claims of both these sites: but it was decided that near Maldon presented advantages both from a traffic point of view and also in regard to economy construction. The bridge has accordingly been erected at Harvey's Crossing on the road connecting Wilton with the Great Southern Railway at Maldon Station, and was opened by Mr. E. W. O'Sullivan, Minister for Public Works on March 12 [1903]. Prior to the erection of the bridge the road used to cross the Nepean River at a stone causeway some 80 ft [feet] below the level of the deck of the new structure, but the approaches were steep and difficult, and the crossing was constantly being damaged by floods, causing delays to traffic and heavy expenditure in maintenance.

The main bridge is a stiffened suspension structure of an uncommon type, inasmuch as the main cables, after leaving the towers, are carried upwards to an anchorage in the sandstone cliffs above the bridge, instead of downwards, as is usually the case. The main span is of 226 ft [feet] centres, carried by suspension rods from the cables, of which there are fourteen on either side of the bridge. The cables have socketed end connections secured to steel girders in anchorages cut out of the solid rock and accessible for inspection. The stiffening trusses are of steel, hinged at the towers and also at the centre, to allow for the rise and fall of the cables due to temperature changes. The roadway is of timber planking, 15 ft [feet] wide between kerbs, carried on timber stringers and cross girders. In addition to the main span there are seven timber approach spans, built on a curve to meet the roadway on either side of the river. The approaches include a considerable retaining wall on the Maldon side. The materials required have been supplied under various contracts. The cables were imported, the steel and ironwork in stiffening trusses etc. manufactured by Clyde Engineering Company, and the timber supplied by various firms. The erection of the structure has been carried out by day labour, under Inspector James McCall, of the Public Works Department. The total cost, including contracts mentioned above and road work in approaches, was £8000."

=== Maldon Weir ===
The Maldon Weir (34°12′12.27″S 150°37′47.01″E) lies about 250 metres upstream from the Suspension Bridge. It formerly supplied water to the nearby Stonequarry Lodge Hostel. Maldon Weir is currently (August 2010) the only weir on the Upper Nepean River not targeted for modification, despite having been identified as a major barrier to fish migration. Most other Upper Nepean weirs will be given increased capacity, to improve environmental flows, and improved fishways will be installed, as part of Sydney Catchment Authority's Weirs Project.

== Maldon today ==
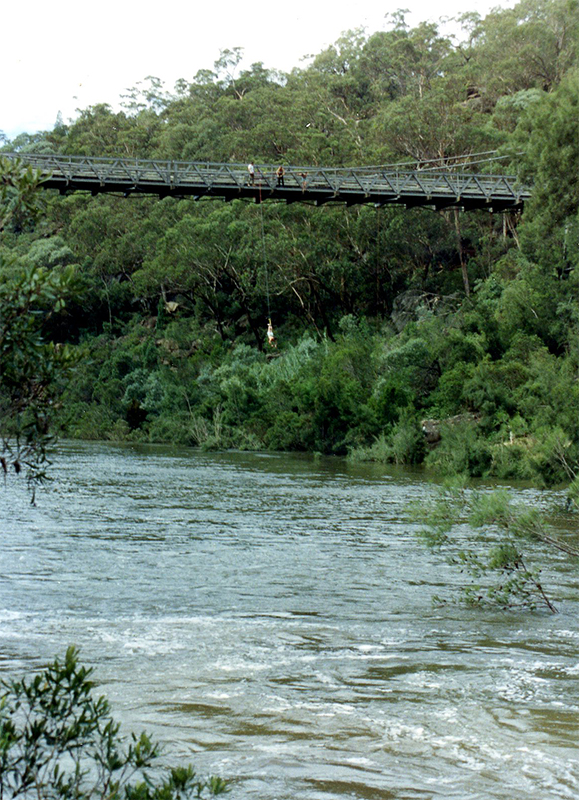
Bridge-jumping 1998. Note high river levels after heavy rains.

=== Industry ===
Maldon has long been home to a cement factory owned and operated by Boral Cement.

A flour mill owned by Allied Mills, commenced operations in 2009. It was the first slipform constructed mill in New South Wales, replacing the company's mill at Summer Hill.

Inghams Enterprises operates a Poultry Hatchery at Maldon.

=== Sport and recreation ===
The Maldon Gorge remains a popular picnicking, bushwalking and swimming spot. The Maldon Suspension Bridge was used for bungee jumping during the 1990s, and in 2000, an attempt was made by a private company to establish the sport of 'bridge jumping' there (a modified form of bungee jumping).

Local opinion largely opposed both these activities, fearing a negative impact on the immediate bushland environment due to increased visitor levels, and deterioration of the bridge itself. The sports were eventually discontinued. The approach roads were closed and barred, and access to the bridge deck was blocked to prevent further damage, particularly from vandalism. The bungee-jumping platform can still be seen on the western side of the bridge. Deteriorating stairs, handrails and other infrastructure installed by the bridge-jumping company remain in the bushland.

The Picton Karting Track is located at Maldon.

== Maldon locality gallery ==
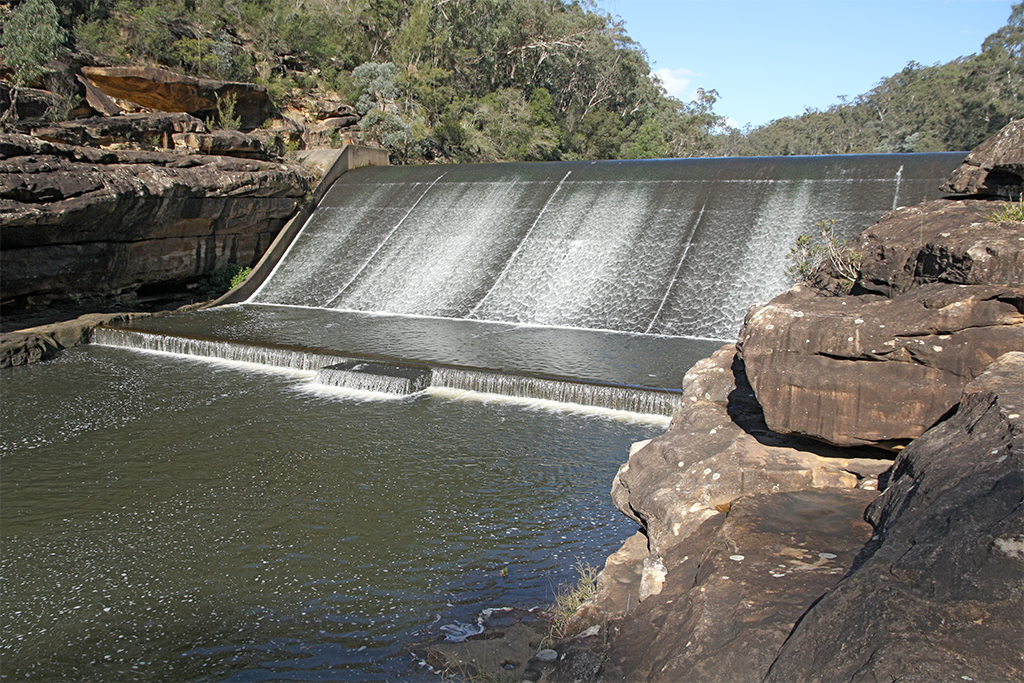
Maldon Weir

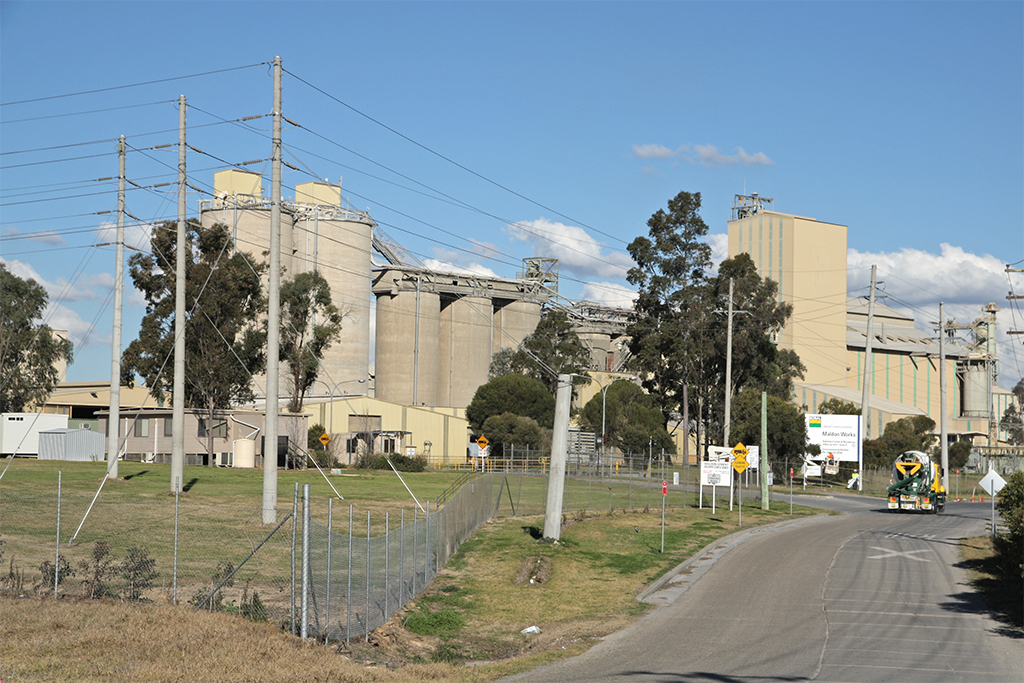
Boral Cement Works

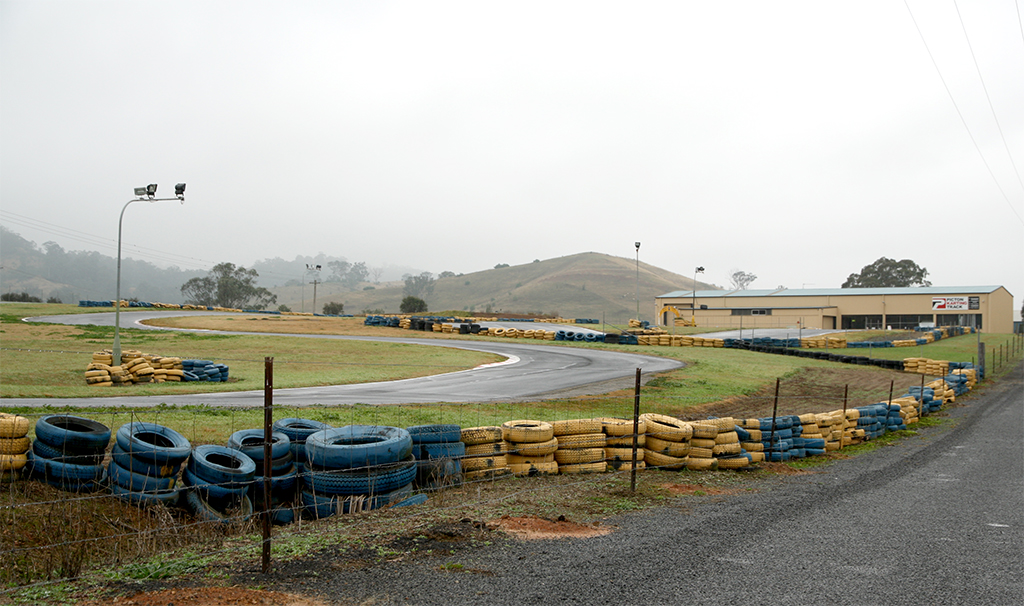
Go kart track

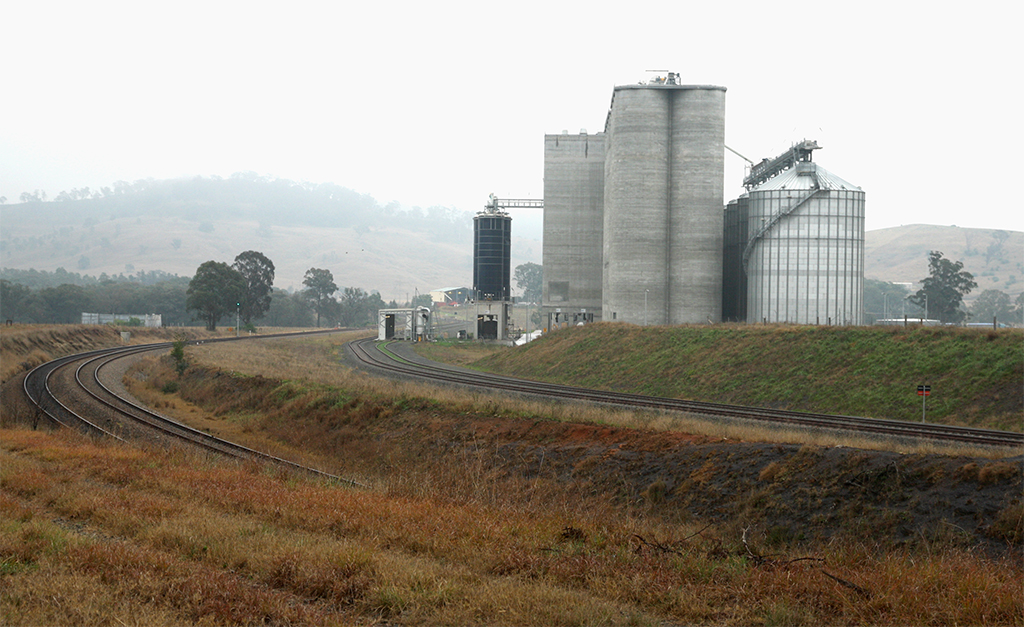
Allied Flour Mill and rail sidings

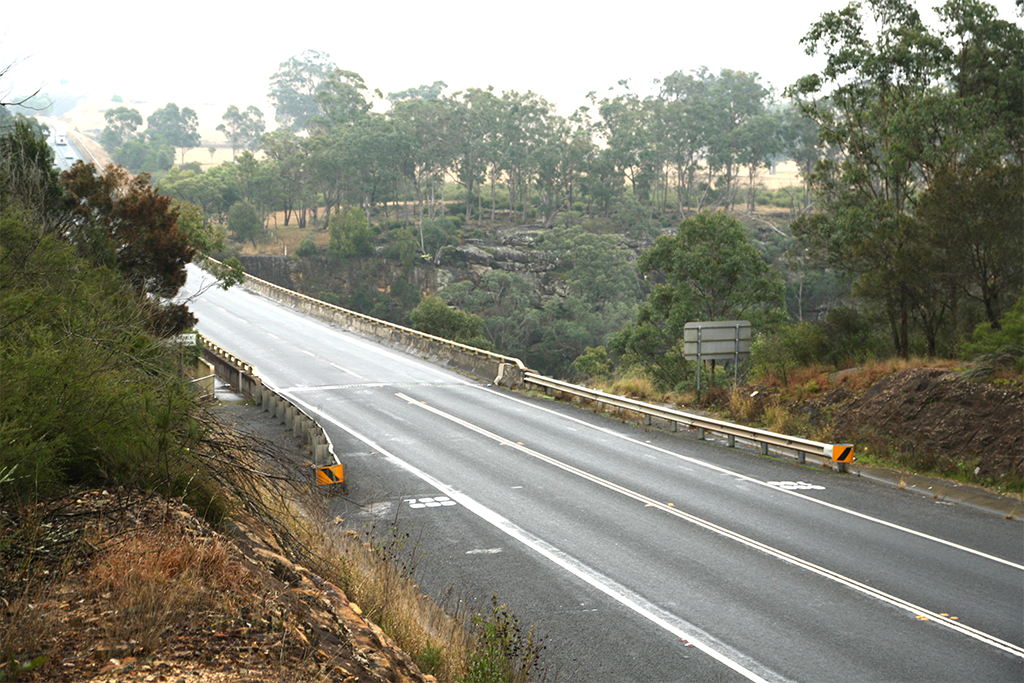
Bridge opened 1980 on Picton Road

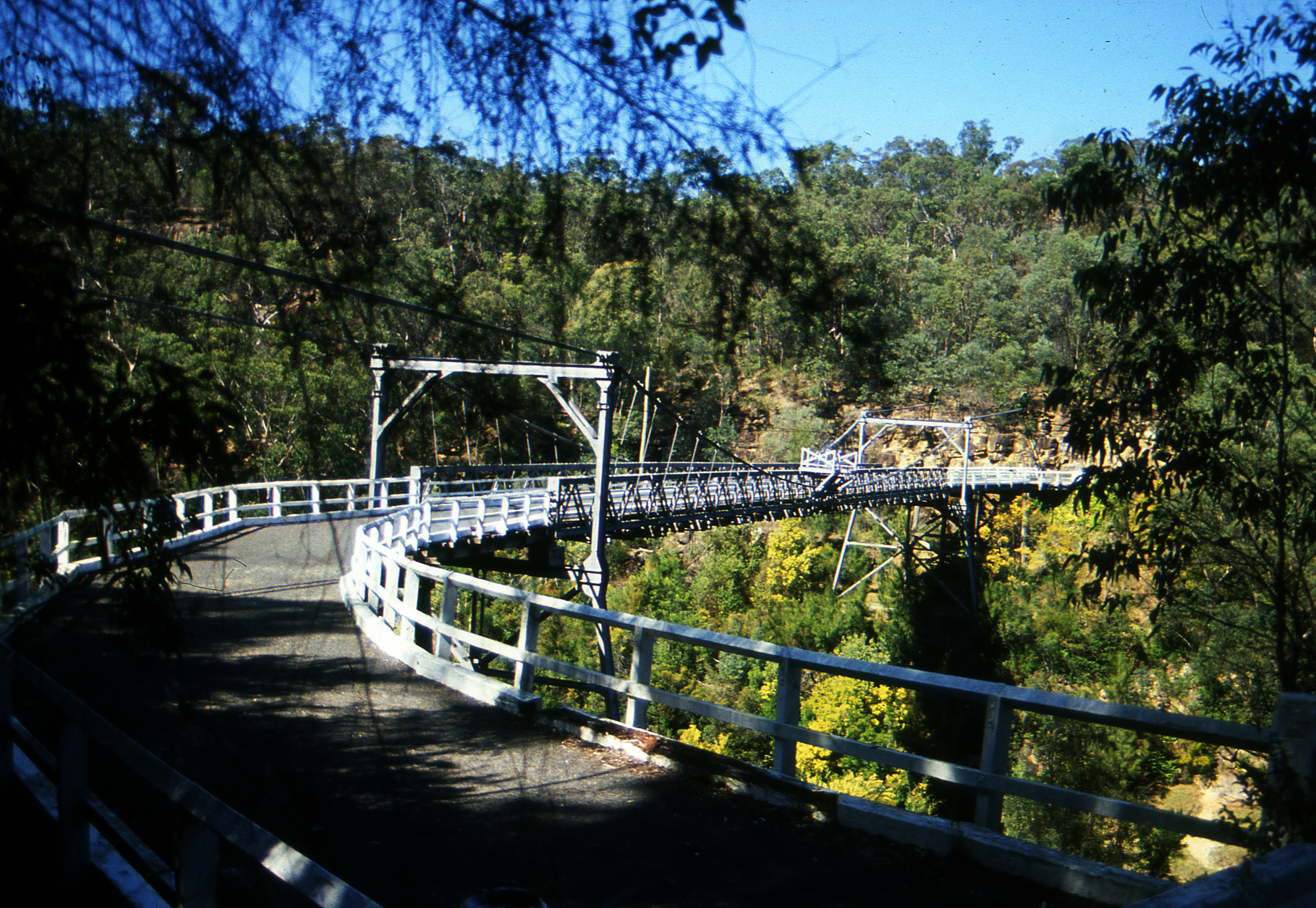
Maldon Bridge circa 1993

== Maldon Suspension Bridge gallery ==
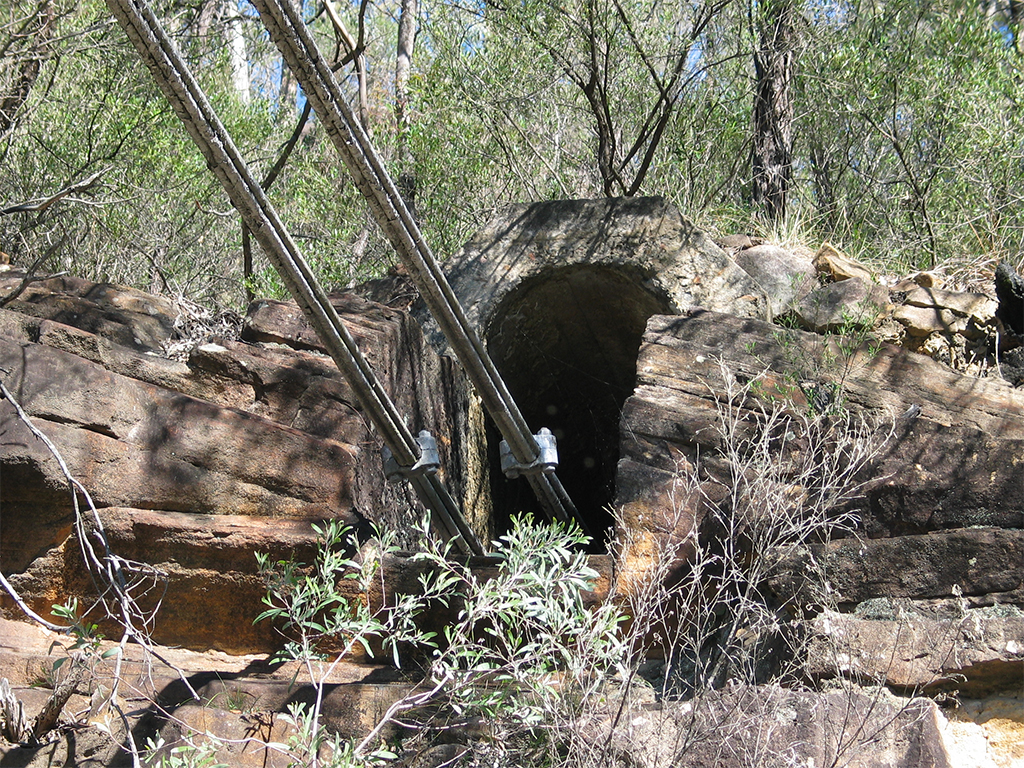
Suspension Bridge Cable Tunnel

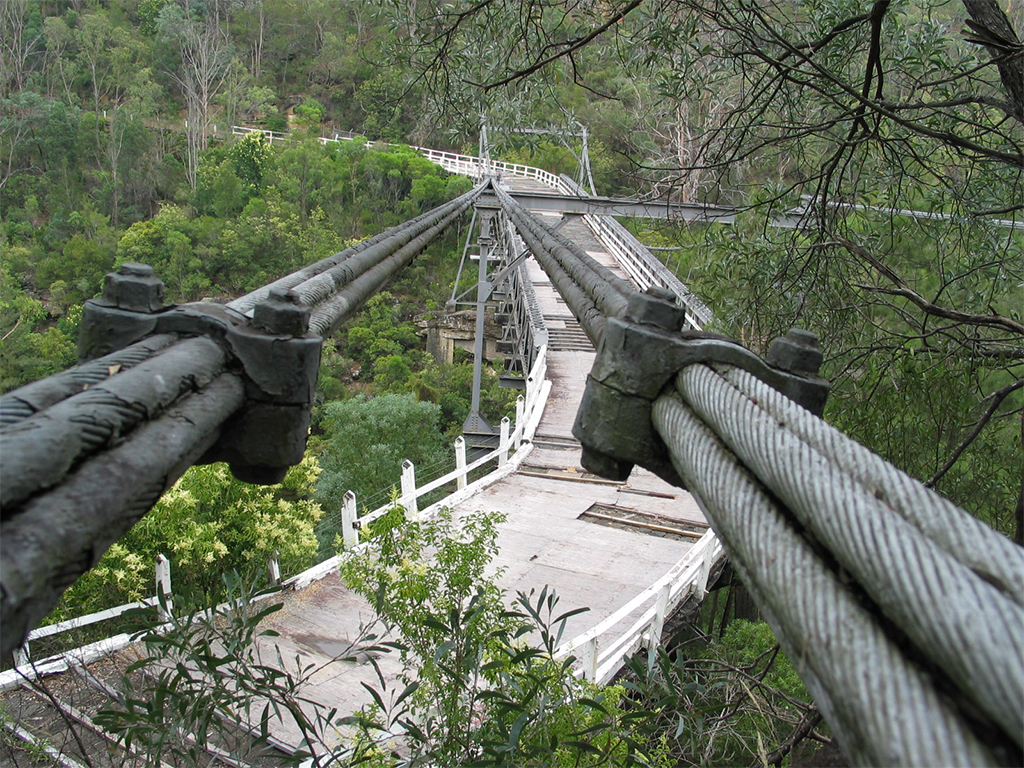
Suspension Bridge deck in 2004

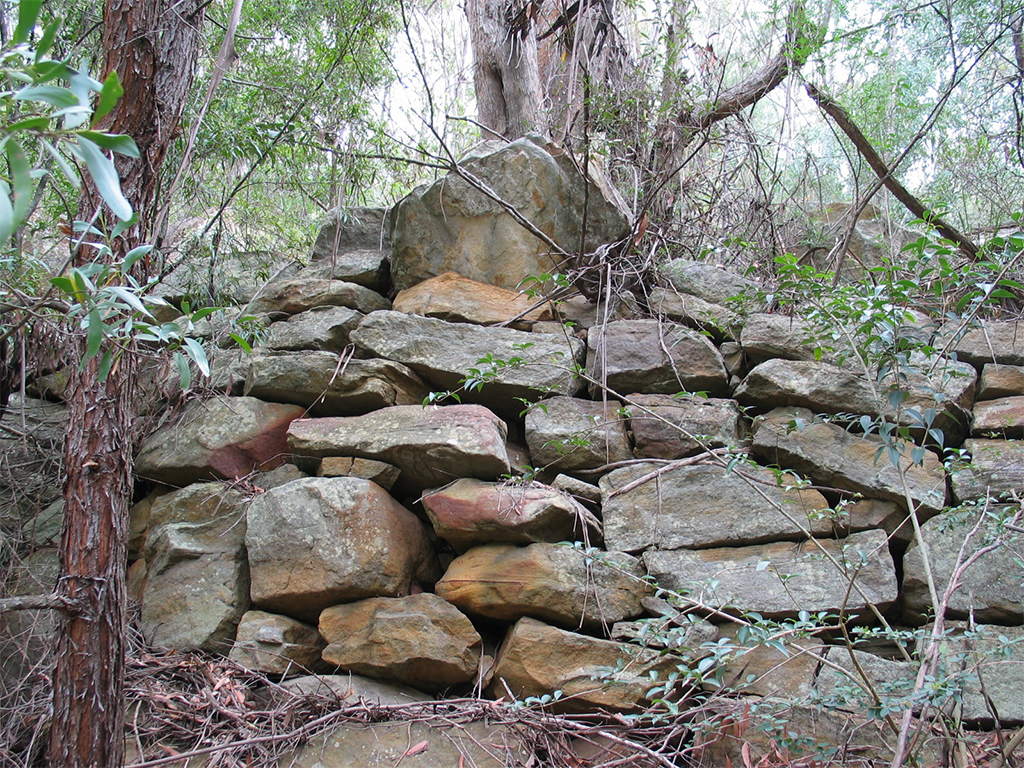
Stonework on southern road to former causeway.

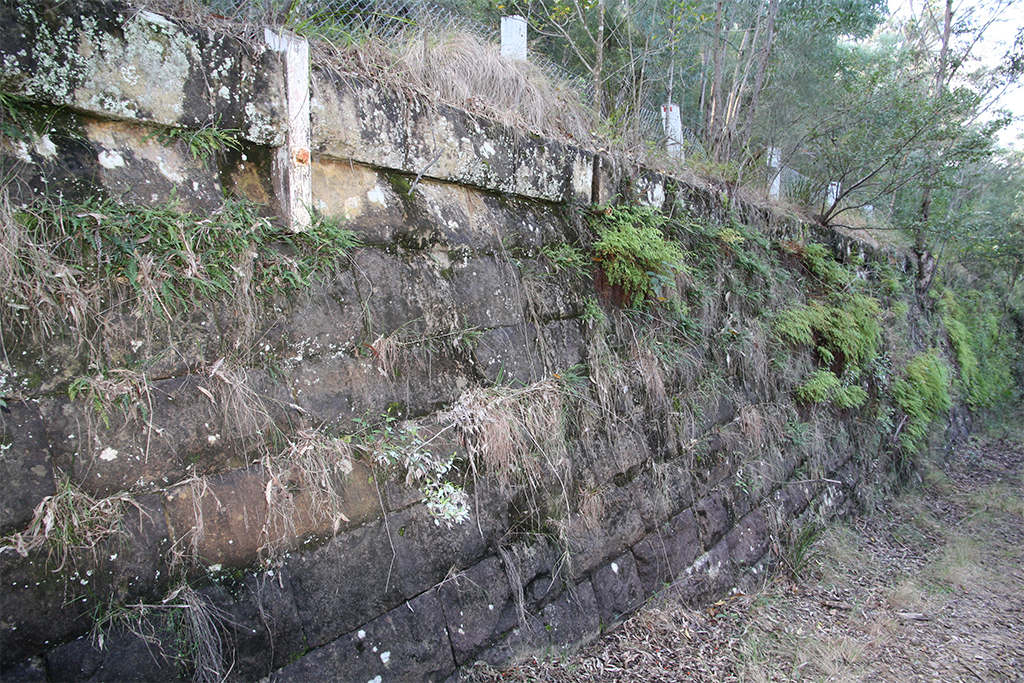
Stonework on northern approach road

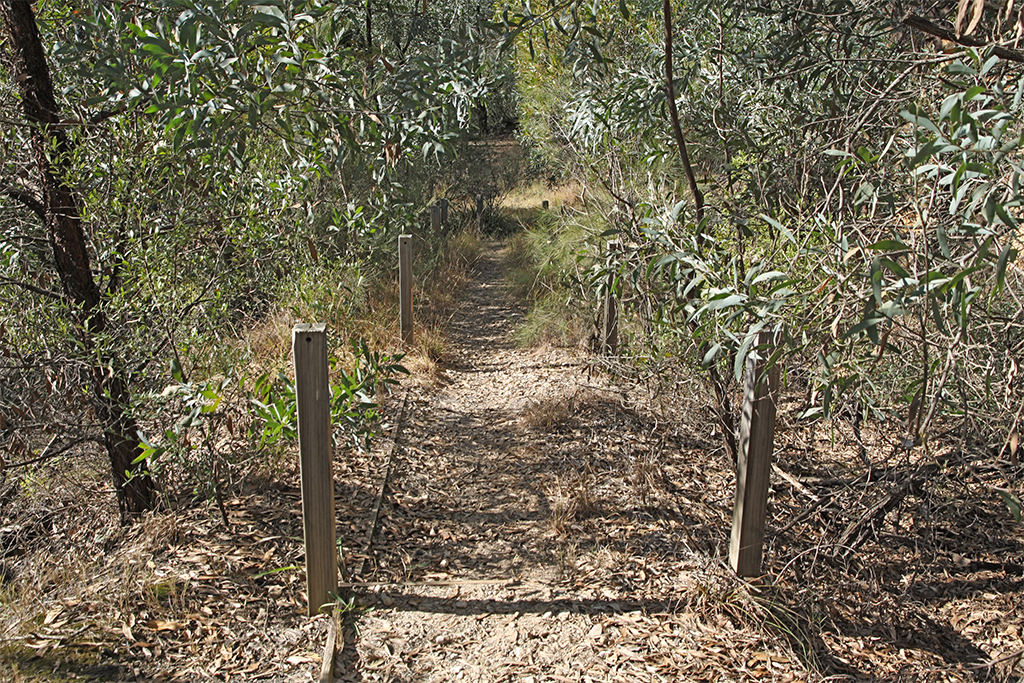
Remains of stairs to Bridge Jumping centre

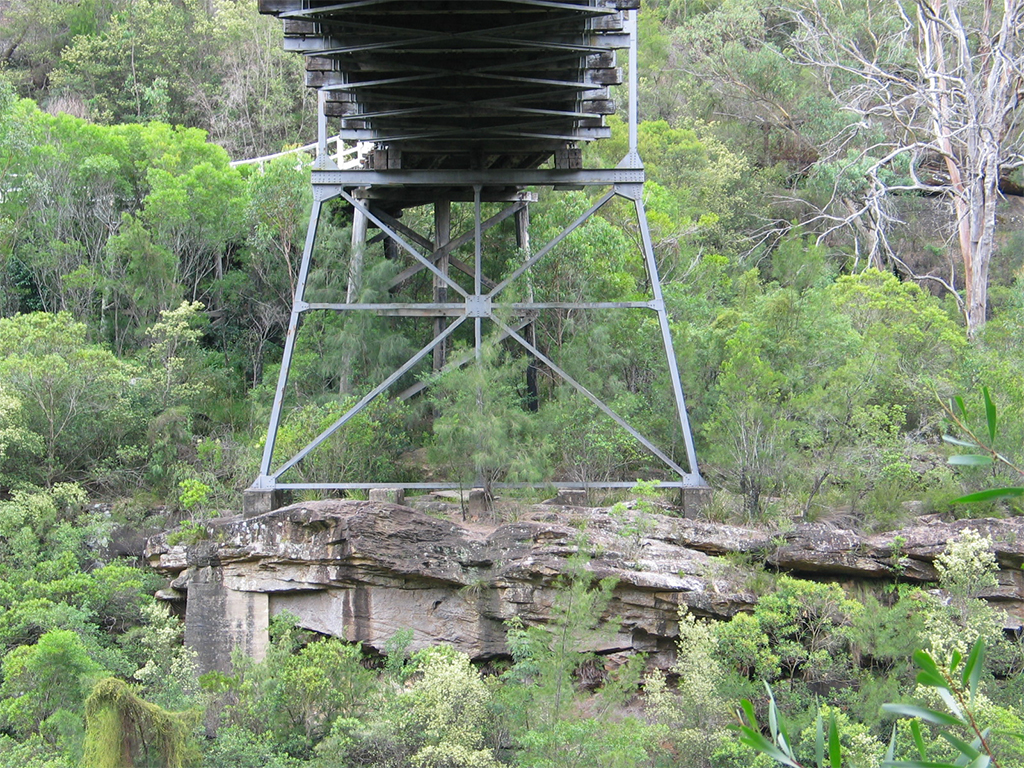
Steel trestle northern end

== Panorama of Maldon Gorge from Maldon Weir ==
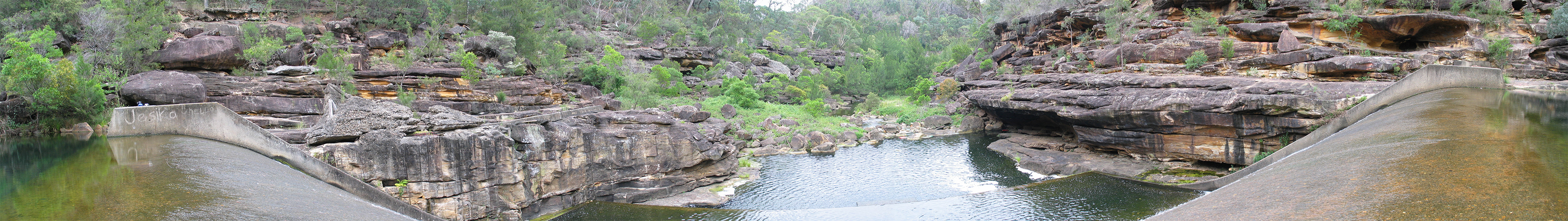
