= Washaway =

Kind of landslide

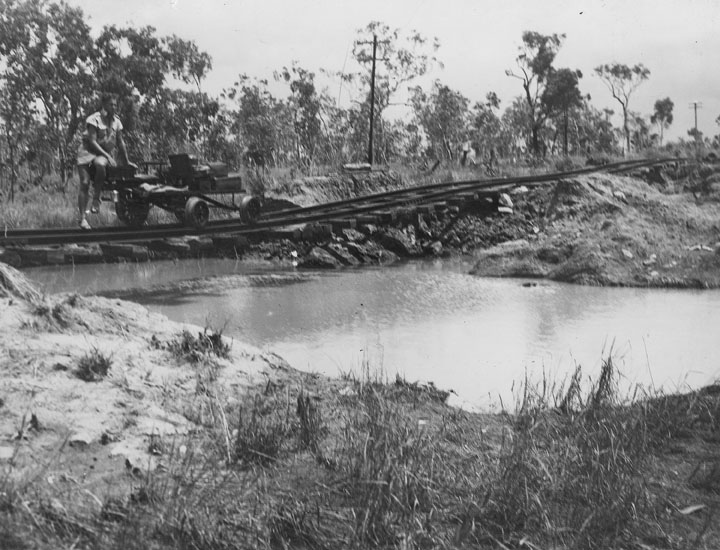
Flood damage to rail track in Queensland, Australia, showing complete washaway leaving rails suspended

A washaway is a particular kind of landslide that can affect construction structures such as cuttings, embankments and bridges. They are thus a hazard to railways and road traffic.

The biggest danger with washaways is that they may be difficult to spot in time to stop short of the point where one falls over the edge and/or into the water where one may drown.

== Repairs ==
An embankment that is washed away can be repaired or restored by replacing the washed away earth, which is necessarily large because embankments have a gentle slope.

A quicker method is to replace the washed out earth with a criss-cross structure of timber steepers called a pigsty which is only slightly wider than the track itself. The pigsty has alternating layers of transverse and longitudinal layers of these sleepers, which contains a lot of air which saves weight. Steel and concrete sleepers are not necessarily suitable for this purpose as they are either not square or fragile.

The sleepers in the pigsty can be reused when the washaway is fully repaired. Rails can substitute for the sleepers. The hollow space inside the pigsty can act as a culvert, allowing water to drain through.

== Warning devices ==
A mechanical railway signal that is normally "green" can be put to "red" if a link in the pulling wire is disengaged by a slump of the earth beneath.

An electrical railway signal that is normally green can be put to red if a contact is opened circuited by a slump of the earth beneath. One side of contact might be attached to the sleepers, while the other side is buried in the ballast beneath. To protect against a false feed keeping the warning signal green, the circuit should be double cut so that false feeds will connect positive to negative and blow a fuse, forcing the warning signal to red. A similar setup might be used to protect bridges likely to be hit by ship collisions, as with the 1993 Big Bayou Canot train wreck.

== Accidents ==
Railway accidents involving bridge washaways include:

- (United States) 27 September 1923 – near Glenrock, Wyoming - a bridge over Coal Creek was washed away and a passenger train derailed, killing 30 of the train's 66 passengers.
- (New Zealand) 24 December 1953 - Tangiwai disaster - lahar caused bridge washaway; train thrown into river; 151 killed.
- 1974 - Crystal Brook, South Australia - train thrown into river after washaway collapses bridge.
- (Kenya) 1993 - 114 perished in a passenger train that plunged into a river after floods washaway a bridge at Ngai Ndethya.
- (India) 29 October 2005 - Veligonda train disaster - 114 killed
- November 2011 - Feroleto-Marcellinara, Italy

=== Cause unclear ===
- (India) Peruman railway accident 1988 - 105 killed

== See also ==
- List of rail accidents
- Washout
