= Giovanni Filippo Crescione =

Italian painter

Giovanni Filippo Crescione or Cressione (Naples, 16th century) was an Italian painter, mainly active as a landscape painter.

== Biography ==
Crescione was a pupil of Marco Cardisco (1486–1542) and a collaborator of Lionardo Castellani. He was a contemporary of Giorgio Vasari (died 1574).
