= Maldon railway station, New South Wales =

Former railway station in New South Wales, Australia

Maldon

General information
- Location: Maldon, New South Wales; Australia
- Coordinates: 34°11′28″S 150°37′55″E
- Operator: Public Transport Commission
- Line: Main South line
- Distance: 82.500 km from Central
- Platforms: 1
- Tracks: 2

History
- Opened: 1 October 1889
- Closed: 12 September 1976
- Former names: Wilton (1889-1890)

Services
Preceding station	Former services	Following station
Picton towards Albury	Main Southern Line	Douglas Park towards Sydney
Location

Maldon railway station was a railway station on the Main South railway line in New South Wales, Australia. The station originally opened in 1889 as Wilton, renamed as Maldon a year later. It closed in 1976. South of the station site lay sidings to a cement works, whilst to the north of the station is the site of the incomplete junction of the unfinished Maldon – Dombarton railway line.
