= Miglierina =

- Comune
- Comune di Miglierina
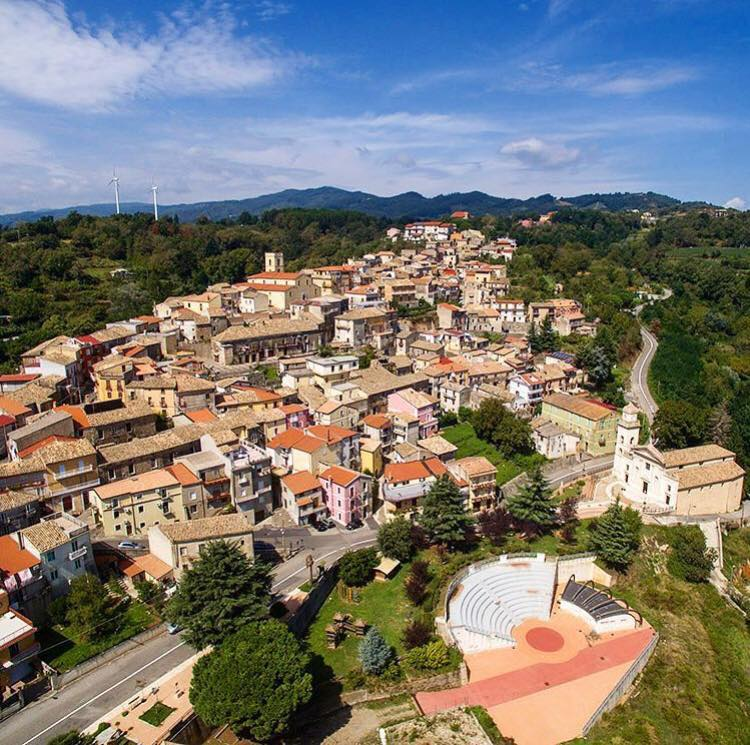

- Location within Italy Location within Calabria
- Coordinates: 38°56′55″N 16°28′20″E
- Country: Italy
- Region: Calabria
- Province: Catanzaro (CZ)

Government
  - Mayor: Pietro Hiram Guzzi (since 2019)

Area
  - Total: 13 km^{2} (5.0 sq mi)
- Elevation: 575 m (1,886 ft)

Population (2024)
  - Total: 705
  - Density: 54/km^{2} (140/sq mi)
- Demonym: Miglierinesi
- Time zone: UTC+1 (CET)
  - Summer (DST): UTC+2 (CEST)
- Postal code: 88040
- Dialing code: 0961
- Patron saint: St. Lucia
- Website: Official website

Miglierina (Calabrian: Migliarìna) is a comune and town in the province of Catanzaro in the Calabria region of Italy. It was historically a hamlet of Tiriolo.
