= Gimigliano =

- Comune
- Comune di Gimigliano
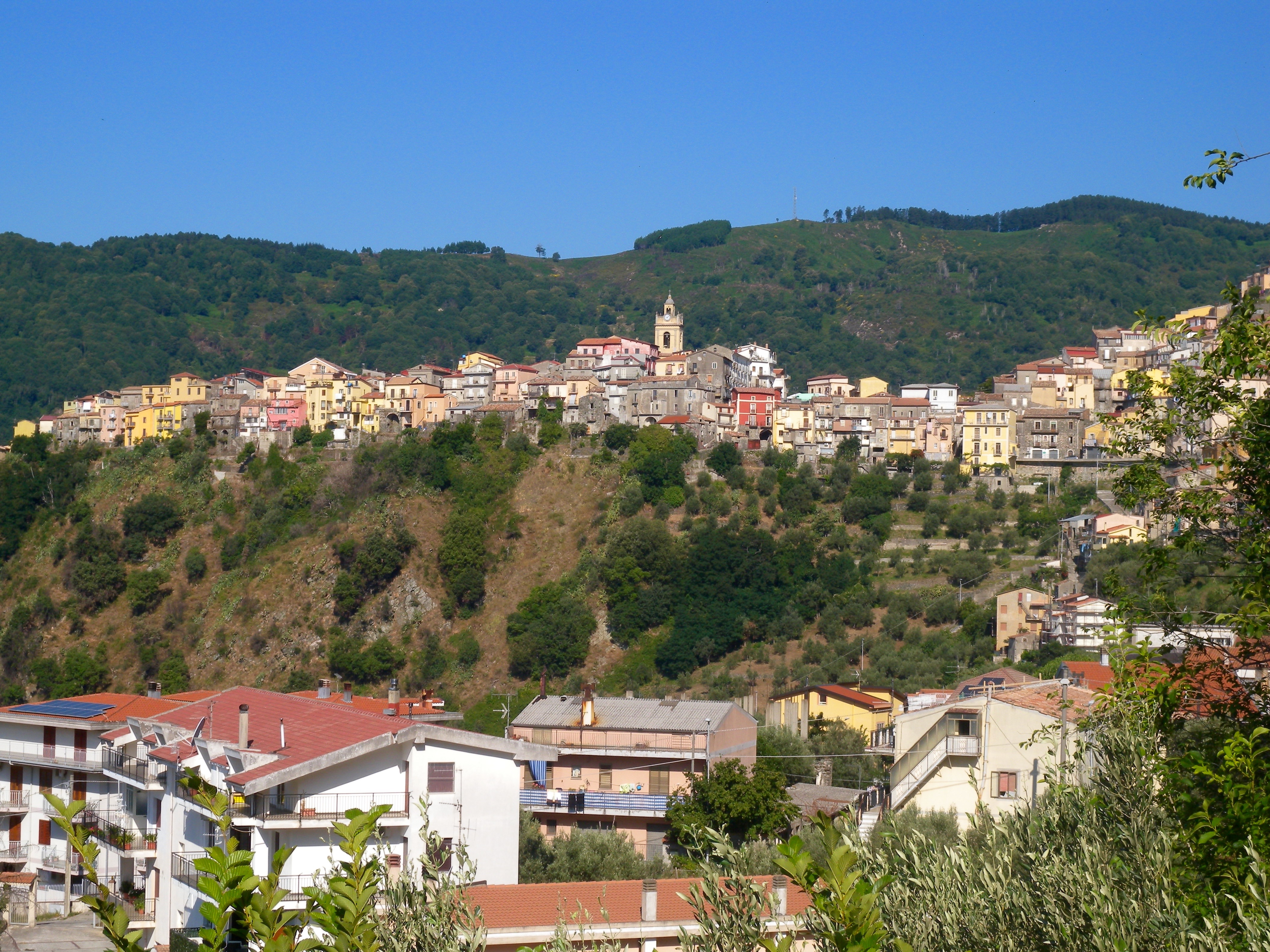

- Location within Italy Location within Calabria
- Coordinates: 38°58′N 16°32′E
- Country: Italy
- Region: Calabria
- Province: Catanzaro (CZ)
- Frazioni: Cavorà, Tre Arie Corbino, Madonna di Porto, Umbri, Canne, Cuturelle

Government
  - Mayor: Massimo Chiarella

Area
  - Total: 33.55 km^{2} (12.95 sq mi)
- Elevation: 600 m (2,000 ft)

Population (31 December 2013)
  - Total: 3,301
  - Density: 98.39/km^{2} (254.8/sq mi)
- Demonym: Gimiglianesi
- Time zone: UTC+1 (CET)
  - Summer (DST): UTC+2 (CEST)
- Postal code: 88045
- Dialing code: 0961
- Patron saint: Saint Joseph
- Saint day: 19 March
- Website: gimigliano.asmenet.it

Gimigliano (Calabrian: Gimigghiànu) is a comune and town in the province of Catanzaro in the Calabria region of southern Italy.
