= Marcellinara =

- Comune
- Comune di Marcellinara
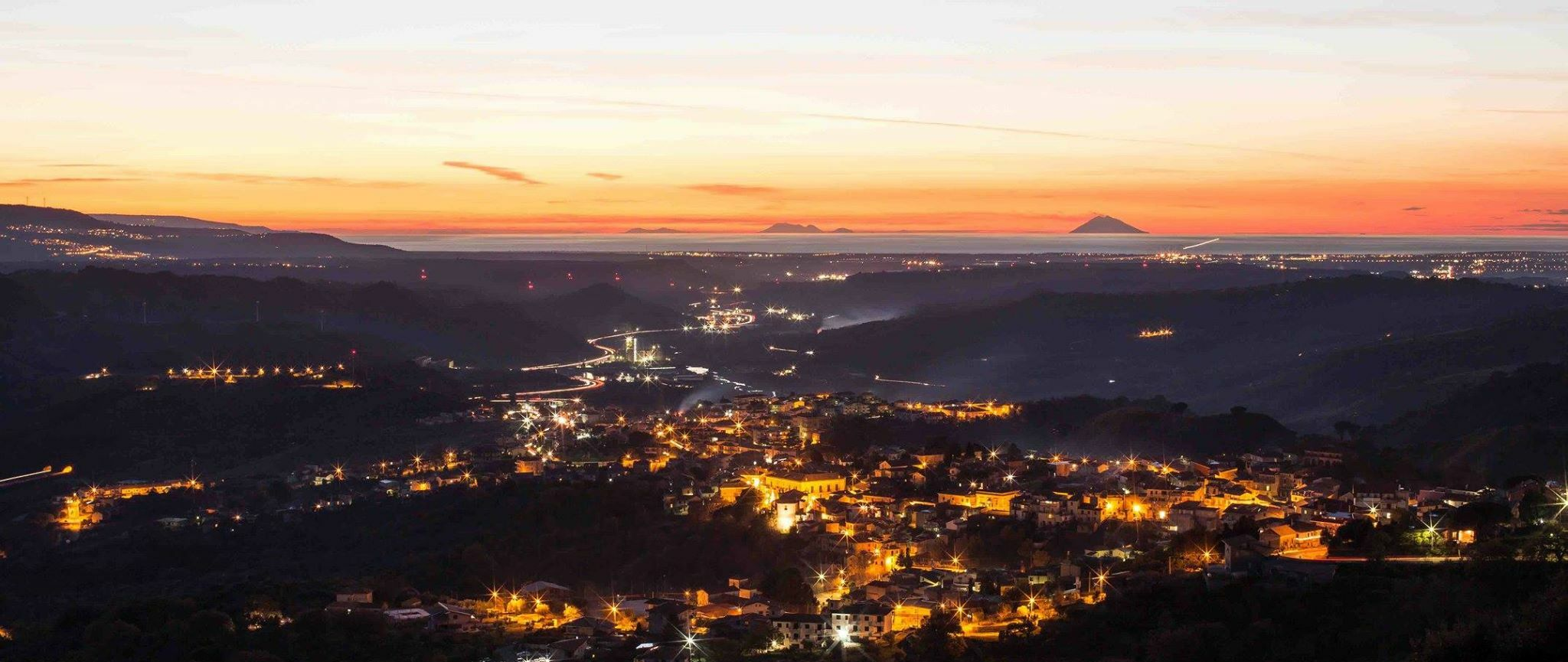

- Location within Italy Location within Calabria
- Coordinates: 38°56′N 16°30′E
- Country: Italy
- Region: Calabria
- Province: Catanzaro (CZ)

Government
  - Mayor: Vittorio Scerbo

Area
  - Total: 20 km^{2} (7.7 sq mi)
- Elevation: 337 m (1,106 ft)

Population (31 December 2015)
  - Total: 2,085
  - Density: 100/km^{2} (270/sq mi)
- Demonym: Marcellinaresi
- Time zone: UTC+1 (CET)
  - Summer (DST): UTC+2 (CEST)
- Postal code: 88044
- Dialing code: 0961
- Patron saint: San Francesco da Paola
- Saint day: 2 April
- Website: Official website

Marcellinara (Calabrian: Marcinàri) is a comune and town in the province of Catanzaro in the Calabria region of southern Italy. It is a small village located in the middle of the narrowest strip (isthmus) of Italy and one of the narrowest of Europe as well, between the Ionian (East) and the Tyhrennian (West) seas; the distance between them is only 40 km.

It is located close to both the regional capital of Catanzaro and the international airport of Lamezia Terme.

== Transport ==
The village is around 20 minutes far away from Lamezia Terme International Airport, from Lamezia Terme Centrale railway station and from the A3 Salerno-Reggio Calabria high-way exit of the same Lamezia Terme.

It is also 15 minutes away from the train station of Catanzaro Lido and 10 minutes from the SS 106 Taranto-Reggio Calabria exit.
