= Luca Matranga =

Arbëresh writer and Catholic priest

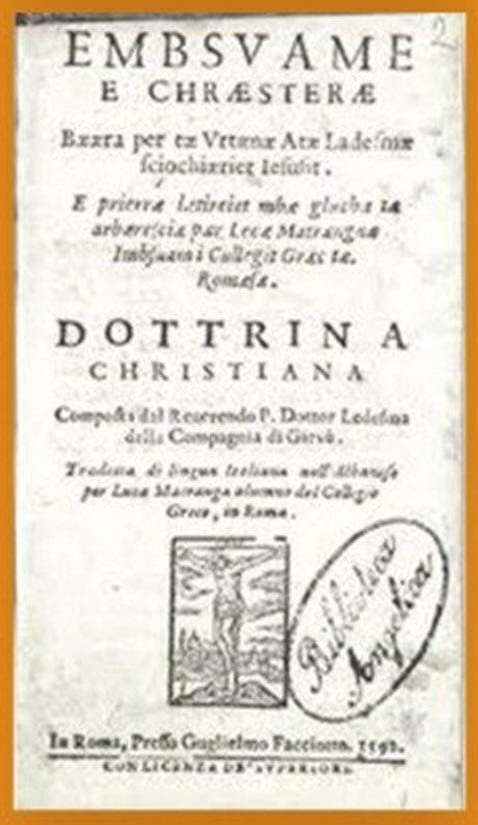
- E Mbësuame e Krështerë / La Dottrina Cristiana Albanese (The Albanian Christian Doctrine), Piana degli Albanesi – Rome 1592.
- Native name: Lekë Matrënga
- Church: Sant'Atanasio, Piana degli Albanesi Cathedral
- Diocese: Eparchy of Piana degli Albanesi

Orders
- Ordination: 1591

Personal details
- Born: 18 May 1569 Piana degli Albanesi
- Died: 6 May 1619 (aged 49)
- Denomination: Italo-Albanian Byzantine Catholic Church
- Occupation: Priest, Translator, Author, Poet
- Education: The College of St. Athanasius

Luca Matranga (Albanian: Lekë Matrënga; 18 January 1569 – 6 May 1619) was an Arbëresh writer and Catholic priest of Byzantine rite in the Albanian community of Sicily. He is regarded as one of the most important authors of Old Albanian literature, as his work contains the oldest written text of Albanian in the diaspora.

== Life ==
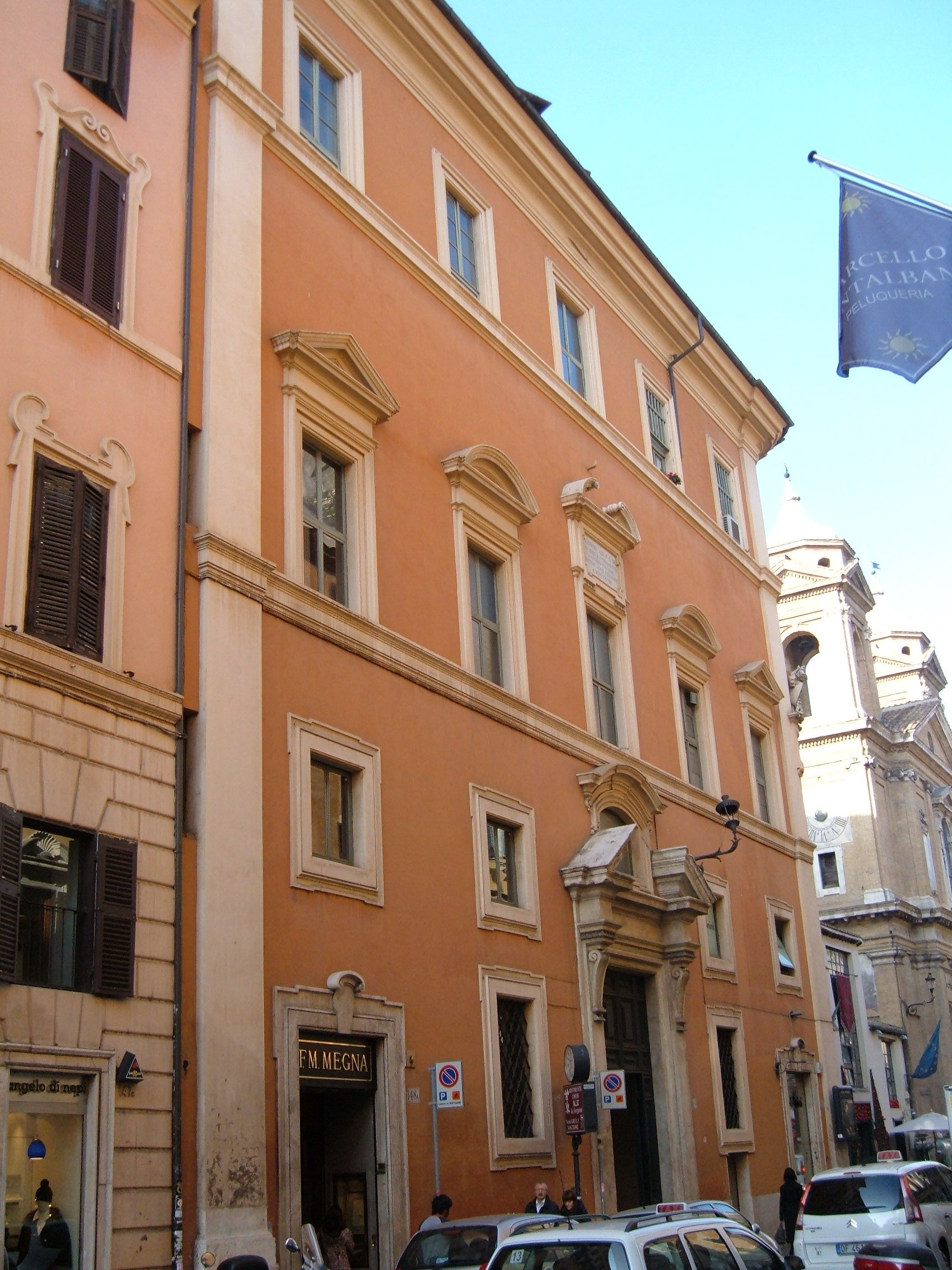
The College of St. Athanasius in Rome (1583), established for the training of the Arbëreshë Byzantine-Catholic clergy, where Matranga was educated.

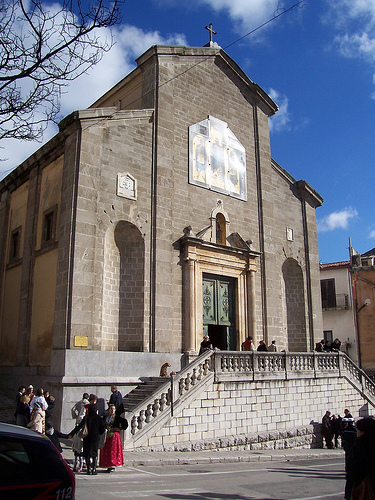
Cathedral of St. Demetrius the Great Martyr in Piana degli Albanesi, Sicily

Matranga was born in Piana degli Albanesi, the largest and most populous Arbëreshë colony in Sicily. He attended the College of St. Athanasius in Rome. There, he was ordained as a priest in 1591 at the Sant'Atanasio church. After his studies in Rome and his ordination as a priest, he returned to his hometown of Piana degli Albanesi in 1601 to become a priest at Cathedral of St. Demetrius the Great Martyr, also known as the Piana degli Albanesi Cathedral. He founded the first school in his hometown to preserve the ethnic and linguistic characteristics of the community.

A writer of noble personality and a priest of the Byzantine rite, he is best known for the first ever creation in the Albanian language, in the Tosk dialect common in southern Albania and among Arbëreshë communities in Italy, of the Christian Doctrine (E Mbësuame e Krështerë) by Spanish Jesuit P. Ledesma. Dedicated to the Archbishop of Monreale, Mons. Ludovico de Torres II, it was published in 1592 with necessary adaptations for the local rite. Matranga used the Albanian speech of Piana degli Albanesi, modifying some phonetic peculiarities to be understood by other Albanian colonies. The probable autograph, where Matranga's version is interspersed with the Italian text of Ledesma's work, is contained in Barb. lat. 3454.

== Main works ==
Matranga was the translator of a catechism book entitled E mbsuame e krështerë (Christian Doctrine) from Latin to medieval Albanian. The book was published in Rome, Italy, in the College of St. Athanasios in 1592, and has 28 pages. The introduction of the book is in Italian. The book covers issues of the Christian doctrine. An eight-line poem of Matranga is also included in the book.

The importance of the book for Albanian literature remains both in the fact that it is the second major book published in Albanian and that the poem is the first form of poetry in Albanian found yet. His book, of which there are two copies, it is absolutely one of the first expressions of philological documented Albanian language in all Albanian literature. This book, E Mbësuame e Krështerë, has particular historical significance, linguistic and literary, being the oldest document in the toskë variant of Albanian literature.

== Studies, transcripts and conferences on Luca Matranga ==
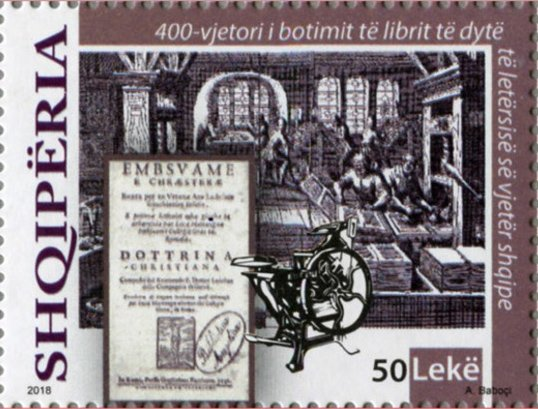
Posta Shqiptare, 2018, commemorative stamp for the 400th anniversary of the publication of E Mbësuame e Krështerë

- Shkrimtari mâ i vjetri i italo-shqyptarvet: D. Lukë Matranga, 1592: copa të zgjedhuna e të komentueve per shkolla të mjesme, Skoder, print of Franciscan, 1931.
- La Dottrina cristiana albanese di Luca Matranga : riproduzione, trascrizione e commento del codice Barberini latino 3454 / Luca Matranga, Vatican City, Biblioteca apostolica vaticana, 1964.
- E mbsuame e Krështerë : Critical Edition of manuscripts and printed (1592) / Luke Matranga, curated by Matteo Mandalà, Caltanissetta-Palermo, S. Sciascia, 2004.

== See also ==
- Arbëreshë people
- Albanian Literature
