= Kristina Gentile Mandala =

Albanian writer (1856–1919)

Kristina Gentile Mandala, dressed in traditional Albanian costume at the Collegio di Maria.

Kristina Gentile Mandala (1856–1919) was an Arbëresh writer from Italy. An early documenter of Arbëreshë fairy tales, she is considered one of the first Albanian women writers.

She was born in 1856 in Piana degli Albanesi, a village in Sicily. Her family was Arbëreshë, an Albanian ethno-linguistic group in Italy. She studied at the Collegio di Maria in Piana degli Albanesi.

Mandala is considered a pioneer among Albanian literary women alongside Dora D'Istrias. She was also among the first writers to compile Arbëreshë fairy tales. In addition, she produced two books of poetry: Pugare (1887) and Fatmeni (1887). She wrote for various periodicals, notably the magazine Fiamuri Arbërit and its successor Arbri i Ri.

Her work was influenced by the Albanian writers Girolamo de Rada and Demetrio Camarda. She was supported in her work by her younger cousin, the poet Giuseppe Schirò, whom she supported in turn in the early days of his literary career.

Mandala wrote in Arbëreshë, though her work was sometimes translated into Italian.
