= Marco La Piana =

Italian linguist

- Born: 1883; Piana Degli Albanesi, Kingdom of Italy
- Died: 1958 (aged 74–75)
- Occupation: Philologist

Marco La Piana (1883–1958) was an Italian scholar of Arbëresh origin. La Piana gave his contribute through his studies on Albanian language and Arbëresh dialects.

== Biography ==
La Piana was born in Piana degli Albanesi (Albanian: Hora e Arbëreshëvet) near Palermo in Sicily. He is the author of a number of studies in Albanian philology, including Il catechismo albanese di Luca Matranga, 1592, da un manoscritto Vaticano (The Albanian Catechism of Lekë Matrënga, 1592, from a Vatican Manuscript), Grottaferrata 1912, Prolegomeni allo studio della linguistica albanese (Introduction to the Study of Albanian Linguistics), Palermo 1939, and Studi linguistici albanesi: i dialetti siculo-albanesi (Albanian Linguistic Studies: The Albanian Dialects of Sicily), Palermo 1949.

== See also ==
- Giuseppe Schirò
- Demetrio Camarda
