= Pirama (Sicily) =

Pirama was an ancient city in Sicily on the road from Panormus (modern Palermo) to Agrigentum (modern Agrigento), mentioned in the Antonine Itinerary (It. Ant. 97.1). Modern scholarship places the site at Sant'Agata in the comune of Piana degli Albanesi, where pottery sherds covering 40,000 m^{2} have been found.
