= Lago di Piana degli Albanesi =

Lake in Sicily, Italy

Lago di Piana degli Albanesi Laghu të Honit
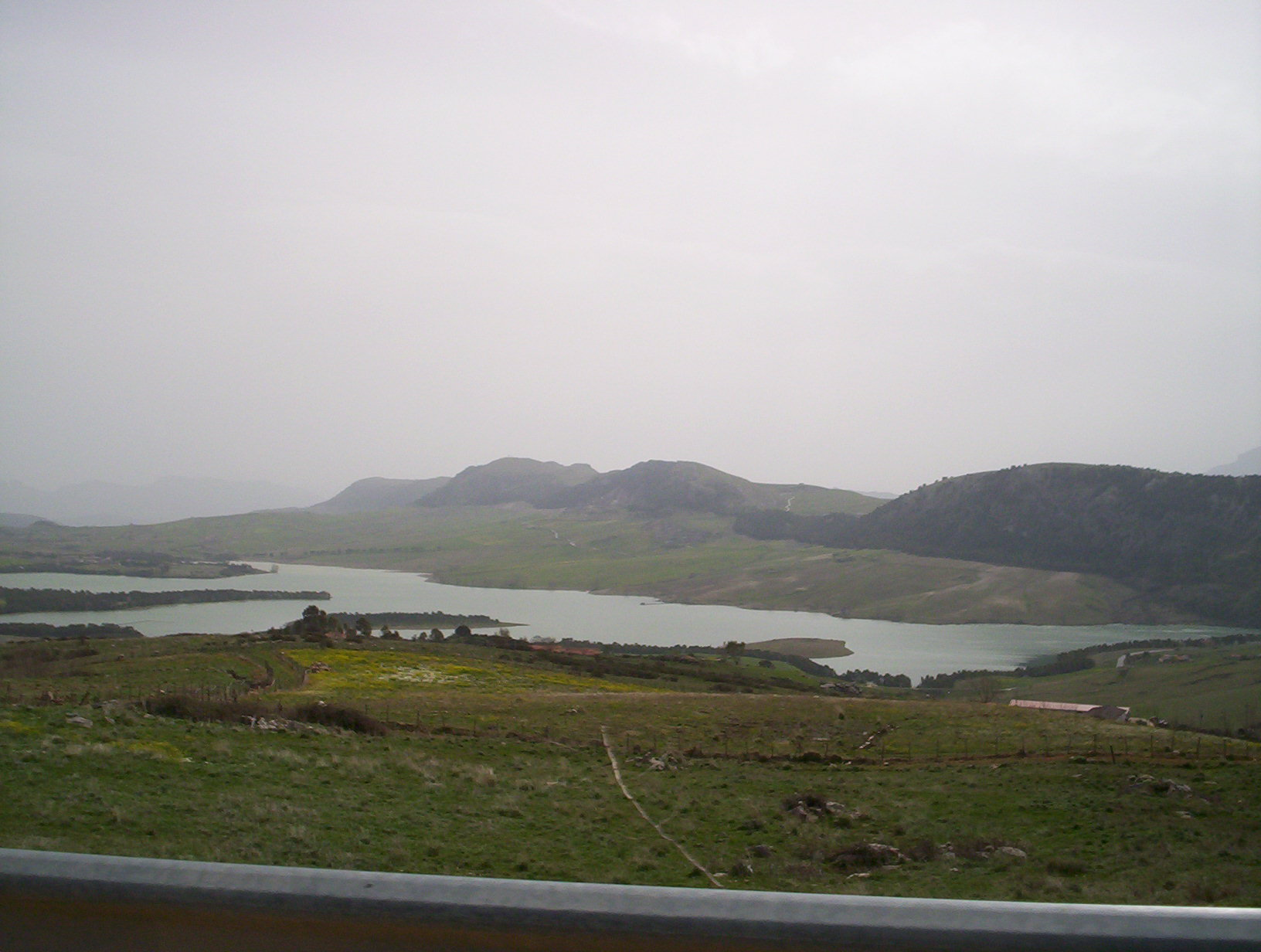

- Location within Sicily
- Location: Province of Palermo, Sicily
- Coordinates: 37°58′23″N 13°18′00″E
- Primary inflows: alcuni torrenti
- Primary outflows: tributary of Belice
- Catchment area: 41 km^{2} (16 sq mi)
- Basin countries: Italy
- Surface area: 3.1 km^{2} (1.2 sq mi)
- Average depth: 10.6 m (35 ft)
- Max. depth: 35.8 m (117 ft)
- Water volume: 32,800,000 m^{3} (1.16×10^{9} cu ft)
- Residence time: 2.1 years
- Surface elevation: 612 m (2,008 ft)

The Lago di Piana degli Albanesi (Arbëreshë Albanian: Laghu të Honit) is the oldest artificial lake in Sicily. It is located in Piana degli Albanesi, in the Province of Palermo, Sicily, Italy. At an elevation of 612 m, its surface area is 3.1 km² and it has an average depth of 10.6 m.

The lake was made to produce electricity and supply water for drinking and irrigation. It was built from 1920 to 1923 by hand. The output water jump 475 m lower until the Casuzze hydro-electrical plant near Palermo. In the 1960s, to supply the increased demand of electricity, a newer plant just near the dam was built, which is still in function.
