= Piana degli Albanesi =

Comune in Palermo, Sicily

Piana degli Albanesi Hora e Arbëreshëvet (Arbëreshë Albanian)
- Comune
- Comune of Piana degli Albanesi; Bashkia e Horës së Arbëreshëvet
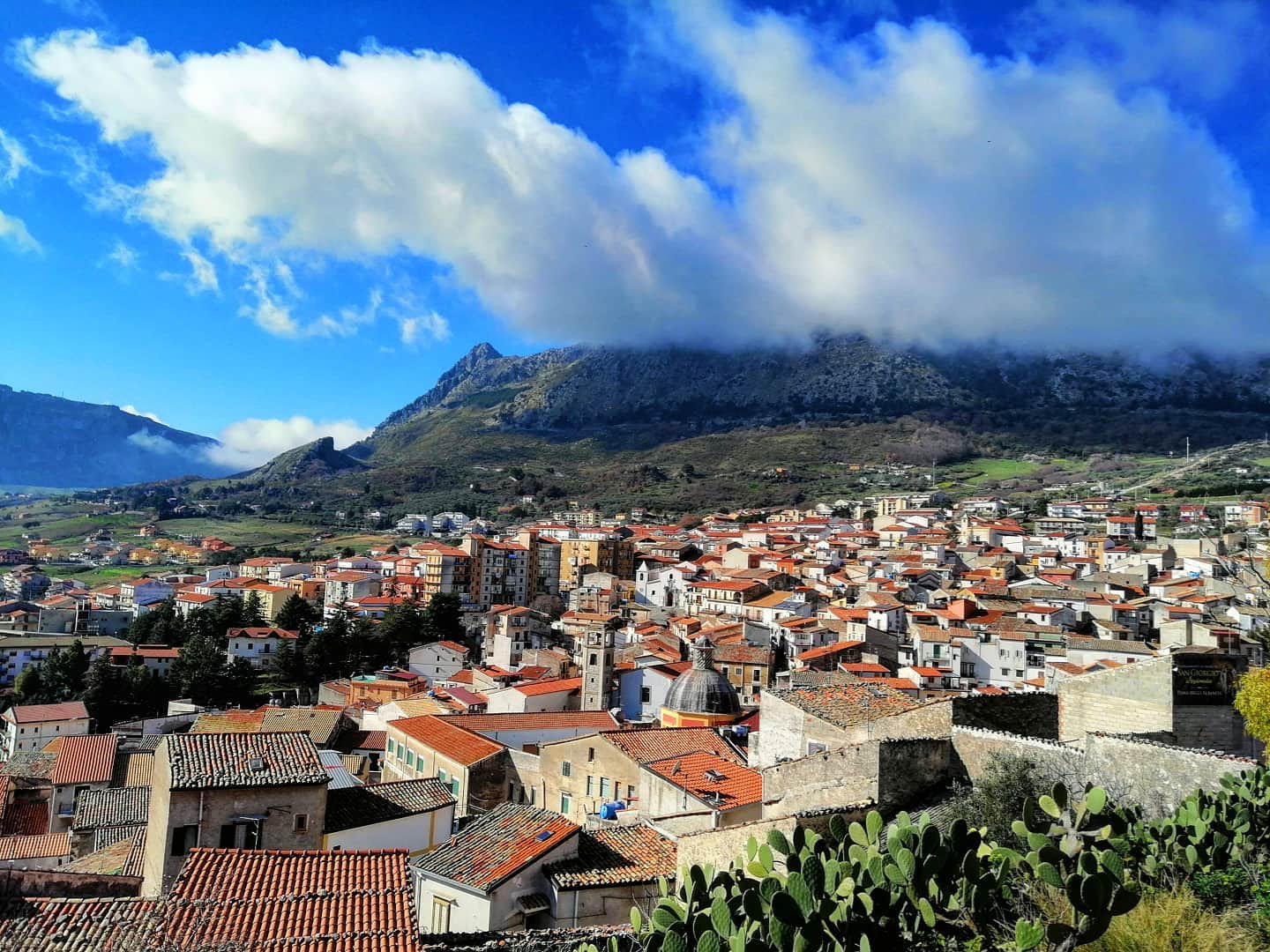
- A view of Piana degli Albanesi

- Flag Coat of arms

- Location within Italy Location within Sicily
- Coordinates: 37°59′42″N 13°17′00″E
- Country: Italy
- Region: Sicily
- Metropolitan city: Palermo (PA)

Government
  - Mayor: Rosario Petta (since June 11, 2017)

Area
  - Total: 64.92 km^{2} (25.07 sq mi)
- Elevation: 740 m (2,430 ft)

Population (March 31, 2023)
  - Total: 5.521
  - Density: 0.08504/km^{2} (0.2203/sq mi)
- Demonym: pianesi/arbëreshë
- Time zone: UTC+1 (CET)
  - Summer (DST): UTC+2 (CEST)
- Postal code: 90037
- Dialing code: 091 857
- Patron saint: M. St. Hodegetria, St. Demetrius, St. George
- Saint day: 2 September, 26 October, 23 April
- Website: Official website

Piana degli Albanesi (Arbëreshë Albanian: Hora e Arbëreshëvet or Hora, Sheshi) is a town and comune in Sicily, Italy. The town is situated on a mountainous plateau and encircled by high mountains, on the eastern side of the imposing Mount Pizzuta, the city, which is mirrored on a large lake. It is located around 24 kilometres (15 mi) from Palermo and is administered as part of the Metropolitan City of Palermo. In 2018, the comune had a population of 6,128.

The town is the most important centre of the Arbëresh community of Sicily, as well as the largest and most populous settlement of Arbëreshe (Italo-Albanian or Albanians of Italy) and it is the episcopal see of the Eparchy of Piana degli Albanesi, constituency of the Italo-Albanian Church whose jurisdiction covers all Albanians of Sicily who practice the Byzantine rite.

The community, founded five centuries ago, has maintained many ethnic elements of Albanian culture such as language, religious rituals, traditional costumes, music and folklore. Piana degli Albanesi has contributed greatly to the advancement of Albanian culture and literature with a large group of intellectuals. It is considered the place of origin of Arbëreshe literature, the birthplace of the first work of the Albanian diaspora (1592), and initiator – in the early 16th century – of the first European school in which Albanian was taught. The founders of the Albanian Language and Literature departments of the universities of Naples and Palermo come from the town, and it is the headquarters of the Italo-Albanian Seminary, which was founded in Palermo in 1734 and moved to the town in 1945. Its traditional music and Byzantine songs are part of the Intangible Heritage Registry of Sicily recognized by UNESCO. The municipal government uses bilingual documents and road signs in Albanian and Italian under existing Italian legislation on protecting ethnic and linguistic minorities.

The Arbëreshe are the descendants of Albanian families, including nobles and relatives of Skanderbeg, that settled in Southern Italy during the Ottoman Turkish conquest of the Balkans. It had a significant role in the revolutionary uprisings for the unification of Italy, for the Albanian National Awakening in the Albanian movement for secession from Ottoman rule, and for regional movements of the Fasci Siciliani dei Lavoratori; furthermore, it is also infamous for the Portella della Ginestra massacre (1947). Between late 1944 and early 1945, Piana degli Albanesi became an independent people's republic, which lasted fifty days.

The main economic activities are the primary sector, agriculture, pastoralism, crafts, and tourism. Its intangible heritage was nominated for the European Heritage Label in 2023.

== Toponymy ==
=== Origin of the name and various appellations ===
Piana degli Albanesi has been variously called in history. In the licentia populandi granted on January 13, 1487, to the Albanian exiles, Piana degli Albanesi is called Casale Planicili Archiepiscopatus Montisregalis or Piana dell'Arcivescovo, but since its construction the town was officially known in Latin Nobilis Planae Albanensium Civitas. This Latin denomination changed into Nobilis Planae Graecorum Albanensium Civitas, with the insertion of Graecorum which indicated the Byzantine Rite practice of the Albanian population (as opposed to the Latin liturgical rites of Latin Christianity). It was referred to as Chiana Albanese in the 18th century, and the Latin original name that included the Albanian ethnic labelling remained until 1810. Due to the Byzantine Rite Catholics and the ancient Greek language used in the liturgical functions, the neighboring Sicilian population gradually referred to it with the Italian name of Piana dei Greci, which remained in the cadastral and habitual use from 1810 until 1941, when the original name Piana degli Albanesi was officially restored.

It was also known and called by the populations of the nearby villages Casale di lu Mercu territorii Montisregalis, Graecorum Oppidum, Badia (transl. Abbey, which indicates the strong religious and monastic communities and in a figurative sense it symbolizes abundance and well-being, because the local church had always been the reference point for the Albanians), La Chiana or Piana delli Greci. Its inhabitants and the Albanians of the other colonies of Sicily, instead, identified it as Sheshi (square, center in Albanian), Kazallot (for a kind of synecdoche: Kazallot, local toponym, equivalent to Hora). After decades of discussion by local Italo-Albanian religious-intellectuals, due to the fact that the Albanian origin was not highlighted in it, following a royal decree and the desire to change the more exact denomination, on 30 August 1941 the Italian name 'Piana dei Greci' was changed to the historically and ethnographically correct Piana degli Albanesi. A few months later, by decree of the Sacred Dicastery for the Eastern Churches of October 25, 1941, even the name of Planen Graecorum was changed ecclesiastically to Planen Albanensium.

The inhabitants call the town in their Albanian dialect Hora e Arbëreshëvet, literally translatable into the "City of the Albanians". For this reason it is usually said simply from the Arbëreshë people Hora, an Albanian word meaning 'homeland' or 'capital', deriving probably from the Greek homophone Chòra, χώρα, a typical word of Tosk and Arvanite Albanians of Greece, and that has the meaning city in Albanian and stands for the literal Albanian qytet, indicating that it is the main one among the Albanian of Sicily communities. Some elders also say Hora e t'Arbëreshëvet, the difference being the addition of të, a plural clitic marker, with the elision of -ë with A- in Arbëreshëvet. Some inhabitants also figuratively say they are Bar i Sheshit (Sheshi grass; born in Sheshi, the center) and call themselves singular arbëresh-i/e, plural arbëreshët.

== Administration ==
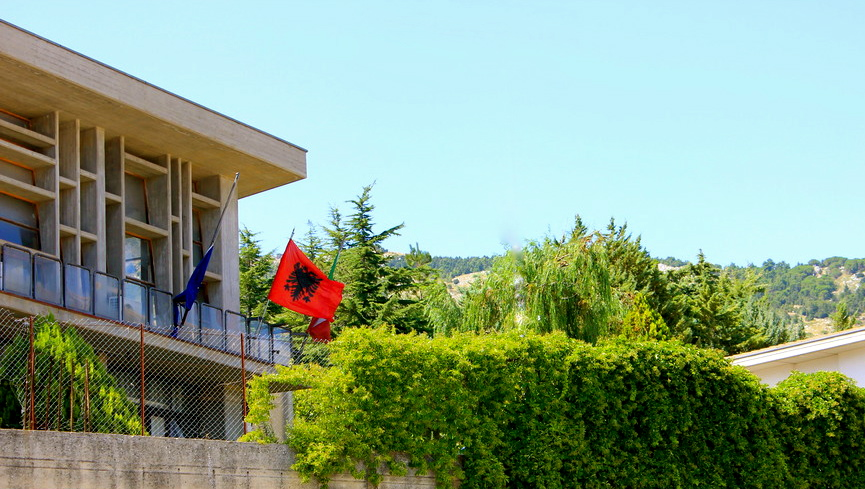
Municipality of Piana degli Albanesi (Bashkia)

=== Twinning ===
The municipality of Piana degli Albanesi is committed to establishing, in accordance with international protocols, relations of cultural exchange with the institutions of the Republic of Albania and Kosovo in the former Yugoslavia and the other Albanian communities present in Europe and internationally.

Piana degli Albanesi is twinned with: Tirana (Albania), since 1954.

=== Other administrative information ===
The Municipality, in collaboration with the Italian-Albanian communities, proposes initiatives to the State, the Region and the Province for the protection of ethnic-linguistic minorities sanctioned by the Constitution, by national and regional laws in force.

The municipality of Piana degli Albanesi is part of the following supra-municipal organizations:

- Unione dei Comuni Albanesi di Sicilia BESA – Lidhja and Bashkivet Arbëreshe të Siçilisë BESA, municipality leader;
- Alto Belice Corleonese Territorial Pact, municipality leader;
- Albanian Ethno-Linguistic Minority Area (Arbëreshë);
- Authentic Italian Villages;
- Unione Comuni Le 4 Terre;
- Agricultural Region n. 6 – Inland hills.

== History ==
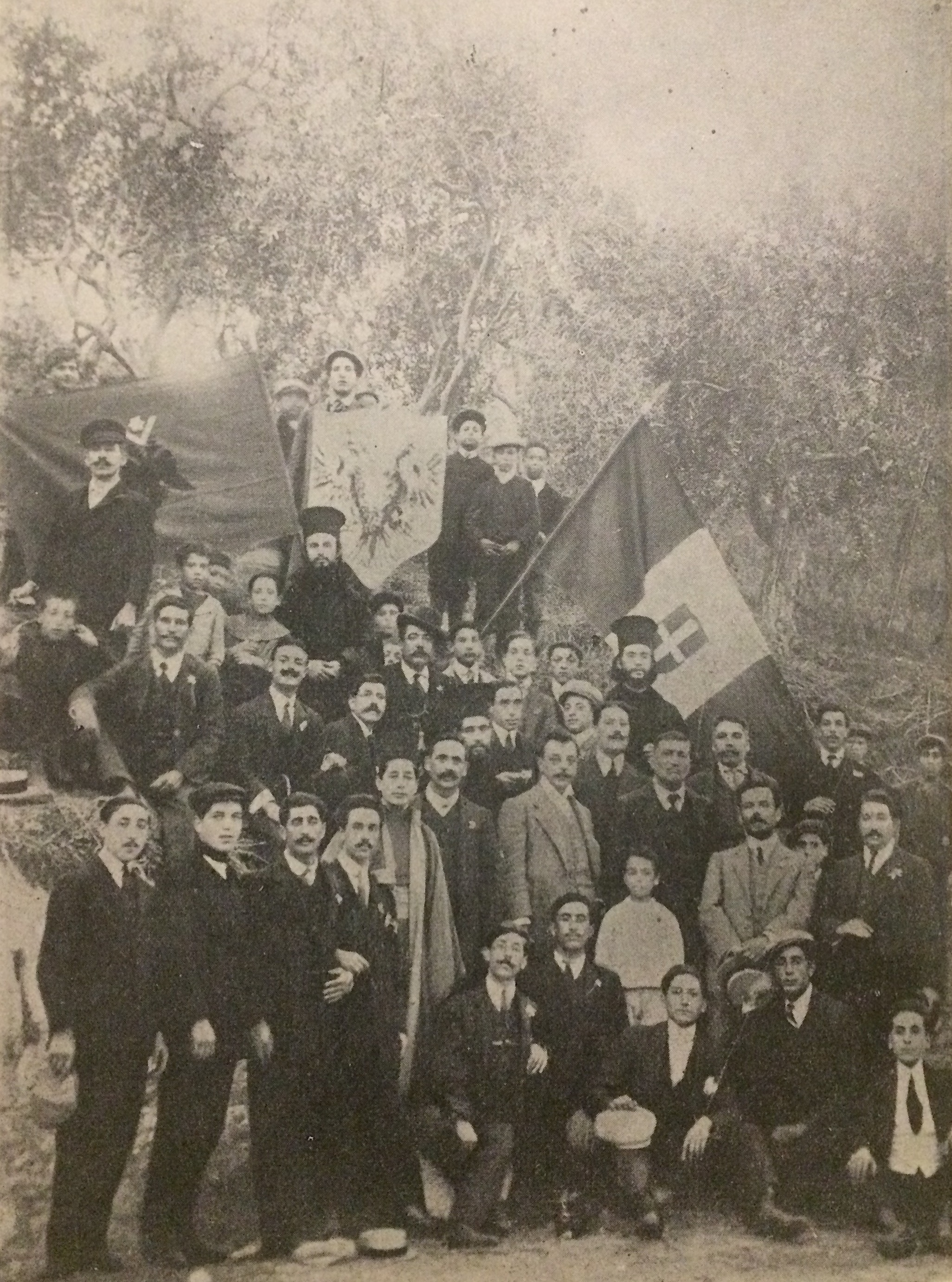
10 September 1911 - "Pro Albania" demonstration (In the center, the Poet Giuseppe Schirò; behind him Papàs Gaetano Petrotta

Piana degli Albanesi was founded in the late 15th century by a large group of Albanian refugees coming from the Balkans during the conquest of the latter by the Ottoman Empire. The exodus began after the death of Skanderbeg, who successfully fought Ottoman armies for more than two decades.

The village foundation was officially sanctioned on August 30, 1488, based on an official request sent in 1486–1487 to Cardinal Juan de Borja, archbishop of the Archdiocese of Monreale, demanding the right to remain in the lands of Mercu and Aydingli, located in the mountains in the province of Palermo.

In 1482–85, after several attacks from the Ottomans, the Christian Albanians were forced to the Adriatic coast where they hired ships from Republic of Venice, escaped by sailing and managed to reach the island of Sicily. They apparently were housed in temporary camps somewhere near Palermo until about 1486 or 1487, when they were granted land known initially as the "Plain of the Archbishop", inland areas of Sicily in the mountains above the city of Palermo. Signed the "capitulation" in Albanian and Italian, which were also recognized with followed by the Brief of Pope Sixtus IV, the official concession of land was granted to the settlers in 1488, followed by the construction of what became the largest Albanian center of the island and primarily, religious buildings.

King John II of Spain and Sicily allowed the original refugees to occupy the present place and to preserve their Orthodox Christian rite. These Albanian refugees were at the time referred to by the surrounding population as "Greeks" on account of their Orthodox faith and the settlement became known as Piana dei Greci. For example, in 1673, the local priest Domenico Mamola in a note written in Greek refers to the settlement as Piana dei Greci. In 1941 during Mussolini's invasion of Greece, the name was changed to Piana degli Albanesi so as to gain the locals support for the fascist regime's imperialist intentions toward Albania. The name Piana degli Albanesi or Plain of the Albanians is a literal translation of the local Arbëreshë name: Hora e Arbëreshëvet.

During the 19th century, the Arbëreshë of Piana degli Albanesi played a significant role for the Italian national unity, and participated in the stronger phases of the movement of Fasci Siciliani. The inhabitants of Piana degli Albanesi were known to have a reputation for rebelliousness, but were not organized politically until the arrival of the Fascio in April 1893.

In 1947, the regional Mafia hired the bandit Salvatore Giuliano to shoot down the annual May Day demonstration of the Pianesi, which took place in a remote mountain pass. The bandit and his gang indeed attacked them there, killing fourteen people in what came to be known as the Portella della Ginestra massacre.

=== Symbols ===
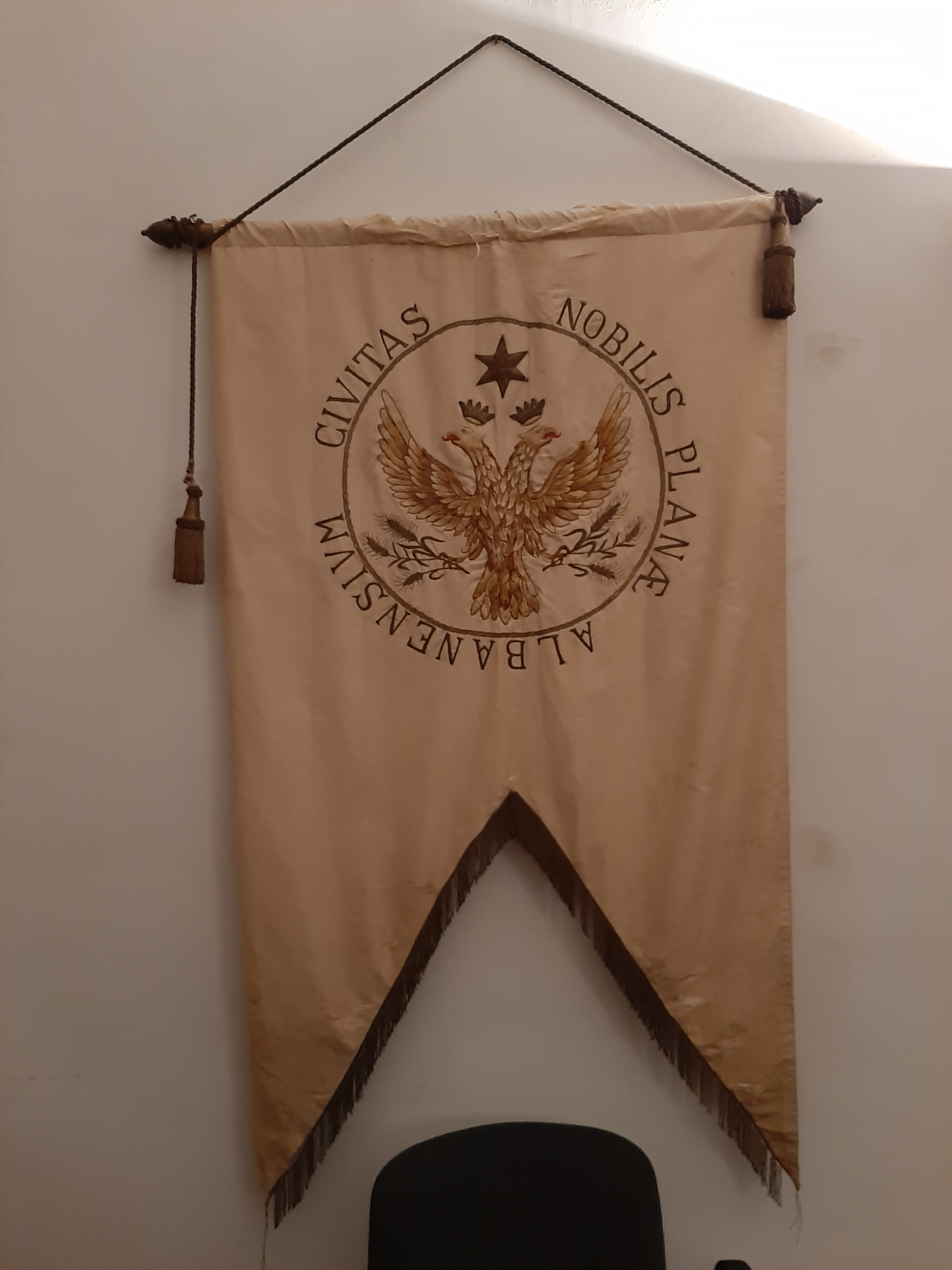
Gonfalone

Variant of the emblem in the former Town Hall

Sticker with municipal emblem

The coat of arms of the municipality of Piana degli Albanesi is thus described by the municipal statute:

[...] Ricamato con fili di seta di colore giallo in varie tonalità, raffigura un'aquila bicipite ad ali spiegate con le teste coronate e sormontate da una stella a sei punte e con tre spighe di grano in entrambi gli artigli. (Embroidered with yellow silk threads in various shades, it depicts a two-headed eagle with spread wings with crowned heads and surmounted by a six-pointed star and with three ears of wheat in both claws.)

The gonfalon of the municipality of Piana degli Albanesi is a rectangular drape with a blue background or red with a round in the center adorned with gold embroidery reproducing the Latin inscription Nobilis Planæ Albanensium Civitas and bearing the emblem. The banner is governed by the statutory provisions of the municipality.

Originally the coat of arms consisted of two ears joined by a knot ribbon with an eight-pointed star in the upper part and with the acronym S.P.Q.A. (Senatus Populus Que Albanensis), or N.P.A.C. (Nobilis Planæ Albanensium Civitas). This coat of arms, which symbolizes the agricultural work of the Albanians, can be seen in local stone in the oldest fountains, such as that of the "Fusha and Pontit" (1765), as well as on the side door of the Church of St. George, the ancient Matrix. Later the Albanian double eagle was always used, with the ears between the claws and the inscription N.P.A.C. In the former Town Hall in Piazza Vitt. Emanuele, now the seat of the Municipal Library "G. Schirò", has a stone coat of arms with the figure of Gjergj Kastrioti Skënderbeu in the center. According to the Statute of the municipality of Piana degli Albanesi, the municipality has its own anthem in Albanian.

== Geography ==
=== Location ===
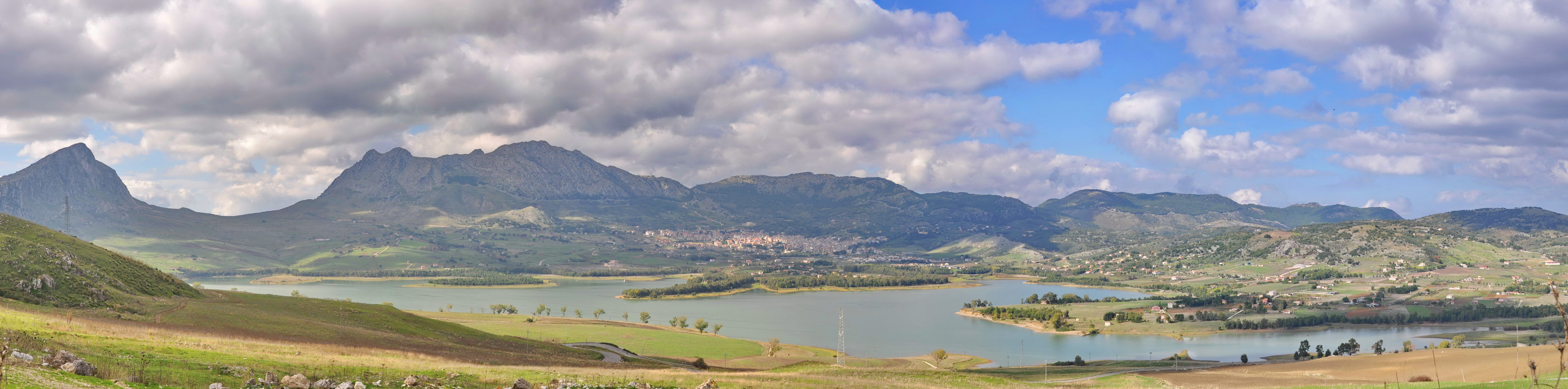
Panoramic view of Piana degli Albanesi

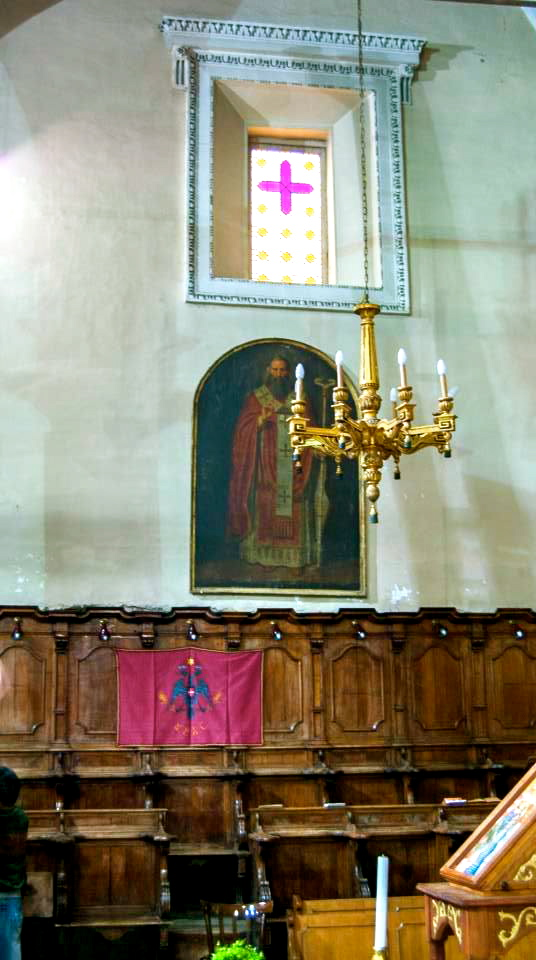
Albanian flag in the cathedral during Holy Week

Piana degli Albanesi is 740 metres (2,430 ft) above sea level in a mountainous valley, located in the hinterland of Palermo. The municipal territory, bordered mostly by natural borders and extended in a south-east direction, has an extension of approximately 64.92 km^{2} and is inserted in the "Serre della Pizzuta oriented natural reserve" and in the "Piana degli Albanesi lake".

It is a mountain resort, whose natural environment and typical mild mediterranean climate create a peaceful and serene oasis. Its natural frame consists of a lake, the mountains and the typical rural quarters.

It is surrounded by four mountains (Pizzuta, Kumeta, Maganoce, Xeravulli), natural sites (Neviere, Cave Garrone, Honi), and the nature reserve Serre della Pizzuta. There are a number of recreational activities available in the area, such as hiking, cycling, horse riding, canoeing, and paragliding.

The territory is crossed by several streams. To the south-east, immersed in the greenness, there is the artificial lake formed in 1923 by damming the Belice Destro river (Lumi Honi), barred in the 1920s to allow for the construction of the Lake of Piana degli Albanesi, since 1999 a natural oasis protected and safeguarded by the World Wildlife Foundation.

=== Topography ===
The original inhabited area initially developed on the rocky Mount Pizzuta (mali Picuta), although, a cause of the rigid temperature, the Albanian exiles moved a little further downstream, in the area of the plain below, on the slopes of the Sheshi mound.

Due to its ethnic, cultural, religious, historical and environmental peculiarities it is part of the varied Sicilian landscape as a unique unrepeatable.

=== Climate ===
Piana degli Albanesi is located in a plateau surrounded by high mountains and is subject to a particular microclimate. Summers are on average warm and sunny, but more windy than in the rest of the island thanks to the mountain breezes. Winters are generally cold but quite variable depending on the year, with rigid snow periods. Unlike the surrounding areas, humidity is high and rainfall is more abundant.

== Demography ==
Historiographical research has not yet succeeded in specifying the number of Albanian refugees reaching the end of the fifteenth century. The building of the farmhouse was therefore relatively rapid, so much so that this first group was joined, between 1532 and 1534, by other Albanian refugees from Corone and Modone. The demographic and economic growth was constant, due also to the constant arrival of new nuclei of Albanian exiles who settled in the town.

The 1624 epidemic that struck Sicily and the continuing famines raged over demographic development. One of the most critical moments came towards the end of the seventeenth century, when a large group of arbëreshë decided to move with their families to the nearby fiefdom of Santa Cristina, owned by the Archbishopric of Palermo, to build a new farmhouse. The displacement involved more than a hundred Albanians, whose names are indicated in the chapters approved in 1691.

From the eighteenth century to the unification of Italy, a positive demographic increase is evident, up to the peak of the population in the first half of the 20th century, although affected by the emigration phenomenon towards the Americas (United States, Canada, Brazil, Cile, Uruguay and Argentina), European states (Germany) or north Italy. Since the second half of the 20th century the population has remained fairly stable.

=== Ethnic groups ===
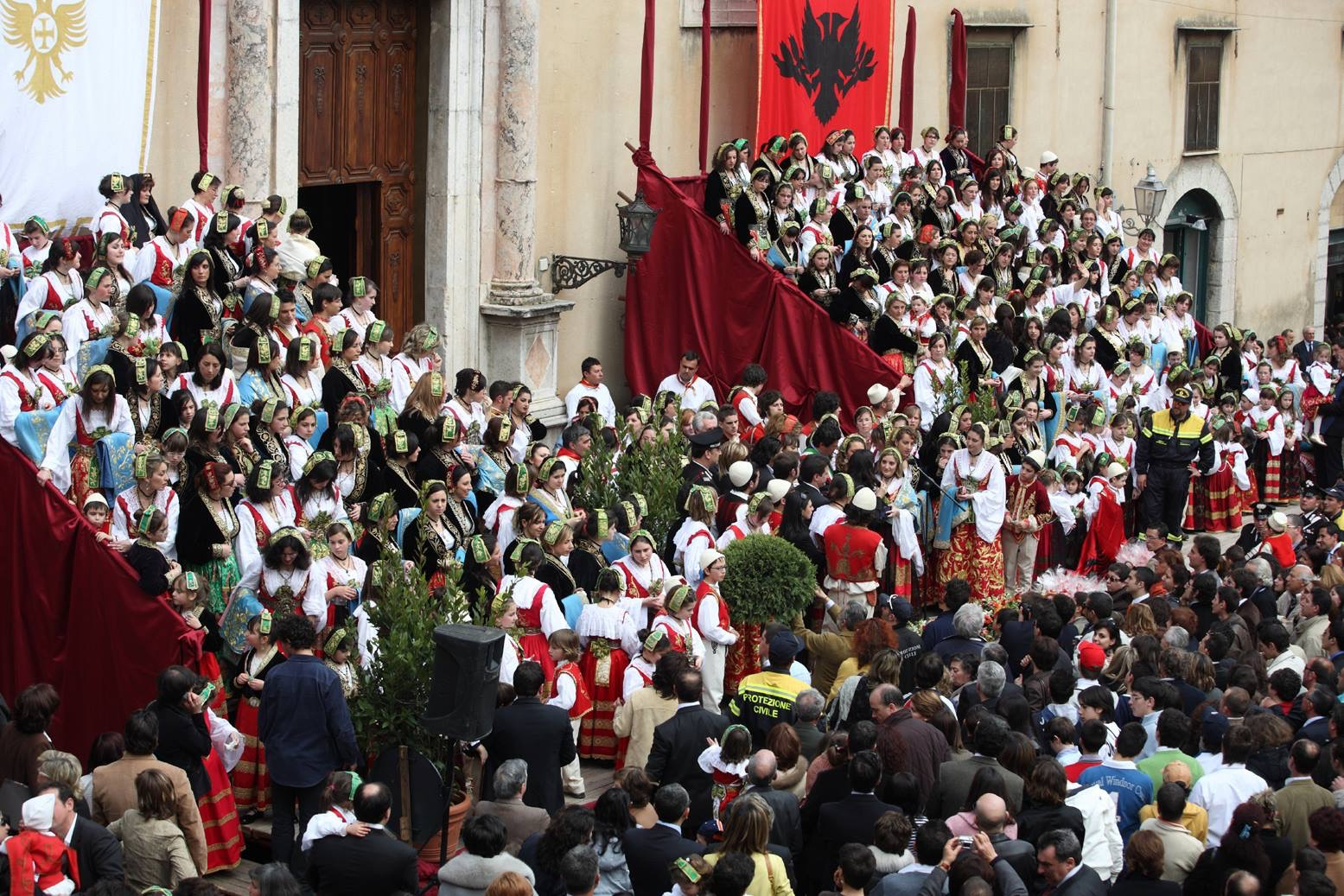
Albanian Easter, national costumes

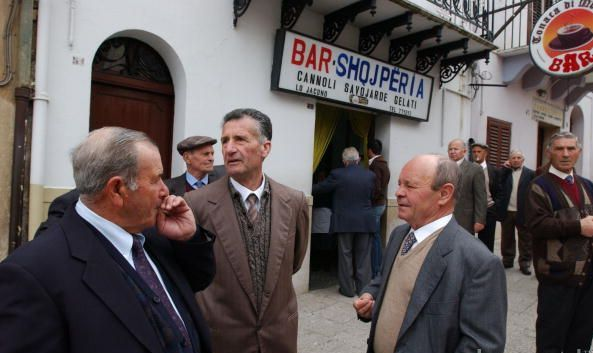
A historic "Bar Shqjpëria"

The ethnic composition of Piana degli Albanesi, whose population is and still feels Albanian, is significantly different from that of the surrounding Sicilian environment. The community is configured as a historically consolidated system with an independent profile in the territory. The different origins, with the strong historical, cultural and value connotations, constitute specific points of the community, on the other hand perfectly integrated.

The Arbëreshe identity, tempered in a foreign land (te dheu i huaj), seals its strong indigenous character. The cornerstones of the community are: the Albanian language, the Byzantine rite, traditional customs and customs, history. The social component was the endogenous force of Piana degli Albanesi: the intelligentsia Arbëreshe, the priests in the first place and exponents of political and cultural life, through institutions and the work of many illustrious men, worked with zeal to defend the peculiarities identity. The maintenance of the Albanian status, as in every identity reality, is confronted daily with the socio-cultural transformism and if once ignoring each other between Albanians and Sicilians was the way to preserve each one's own specificities, the current territorial dynamics not they allow it to the extent that the world-system is expressed through relations from the local to the supra-local.

The community maintains traditional rituals, customs, and its local language. Local religious and cultural institutions also participate in preserving these cultural traditions.

A flourishing Albanian community of Albania of very recent immigration, post-fall of the communist regime of 1990, coexists and is well integrated in the social of Piana degli Albanesi, with the creation of a community of arbëreshë which gathers within it a rooted core of shqiptarë. There is no lack of marriages between Italo-Albanians and Albanians from the Balkans.

Between 1997 and 2002 the municipality and the Eparchy of Piana degli Albanesi welcomed and helped the Albanians from Kosovo affected by the war.

== Cityscape ==
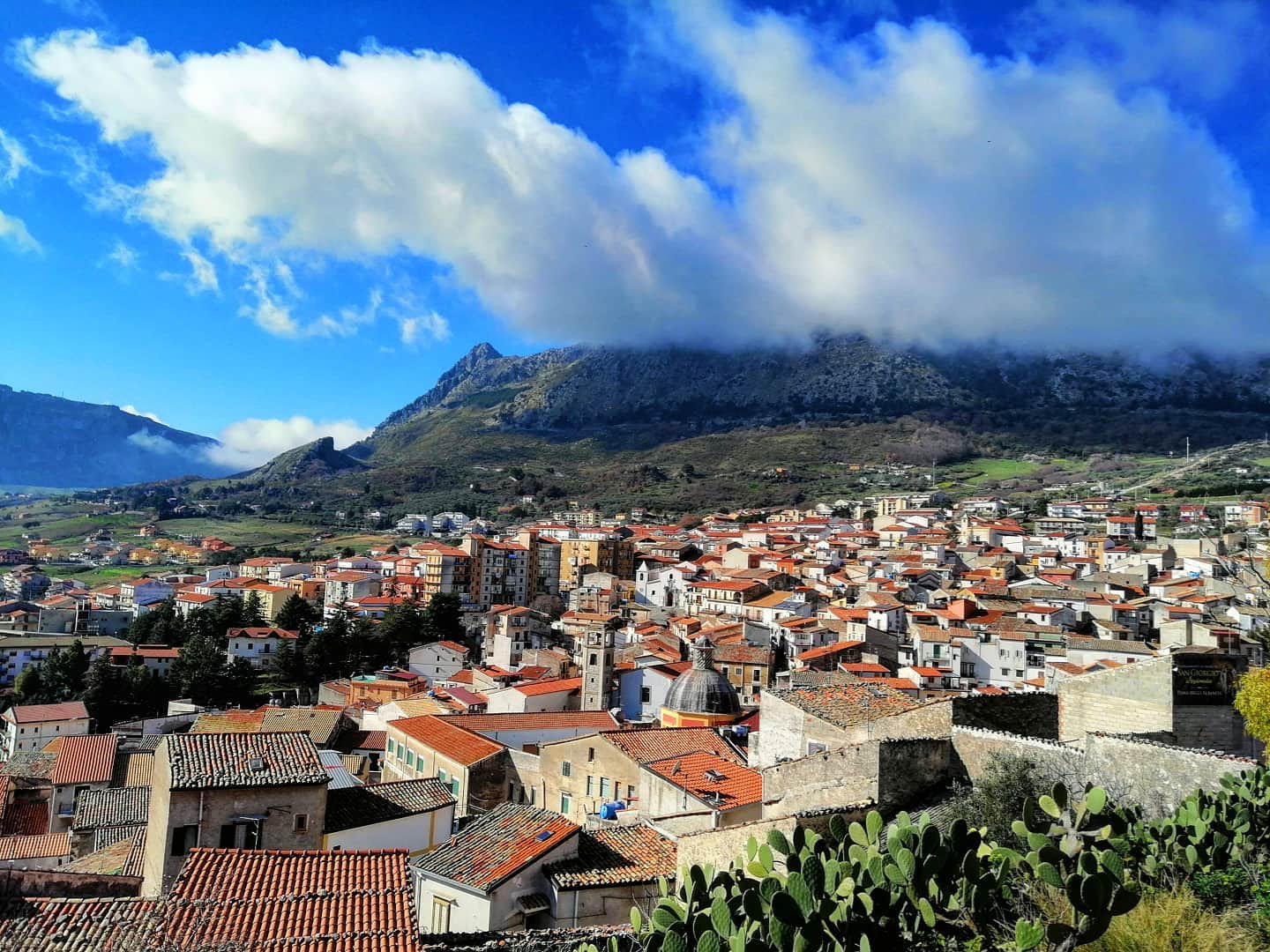
Overview from the hill Sheshi

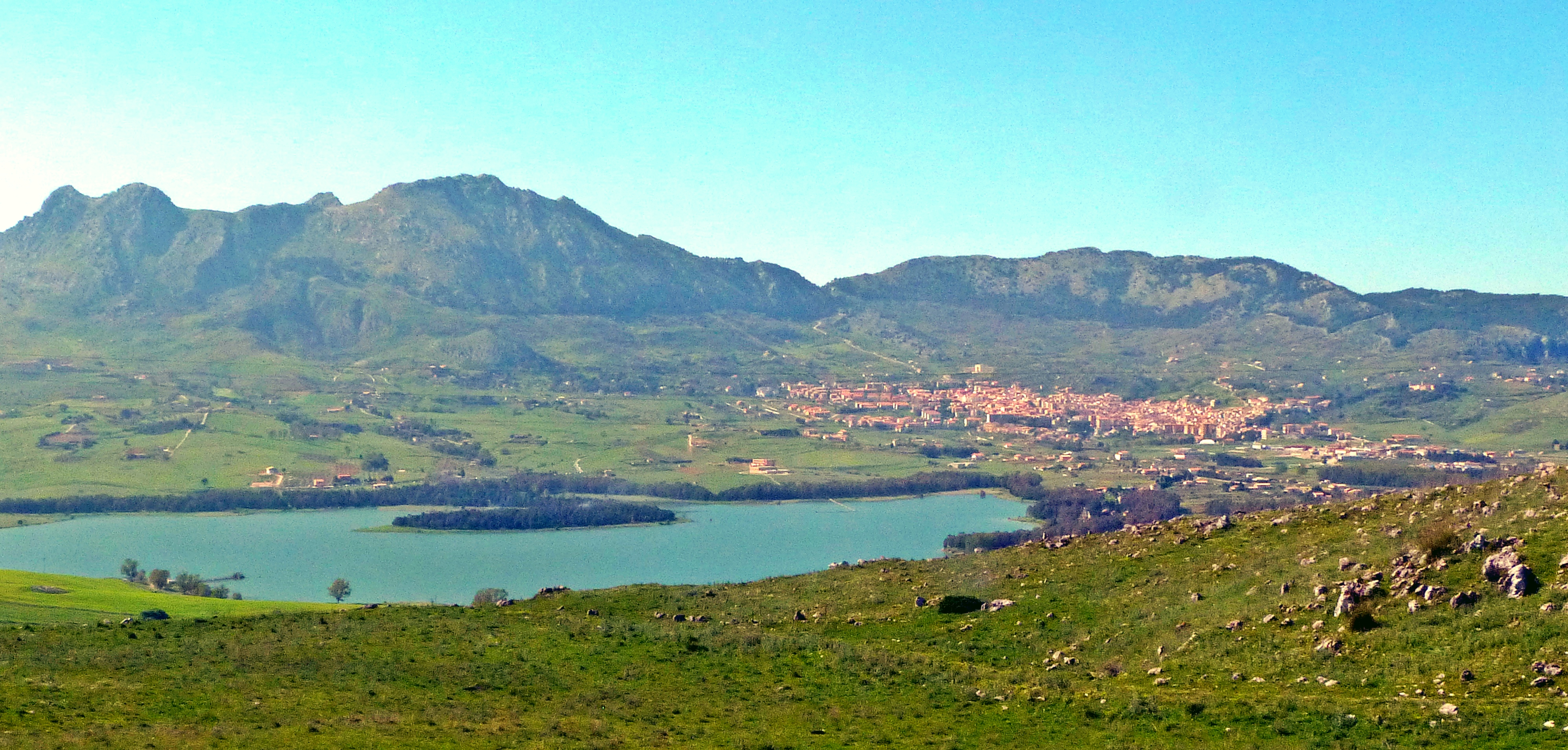
Landscape of Piana degli Albanesi

The historic center of the town has a late-medieval style, reflecting the social status and economic conditions of the time when the settlement was built. The city streets are

narrow and consist of steps (shkallët) and neighbourhoods (gjitonia), the roads are generally narrow and provide a meeting place in front of the houses, with the exception of the main road (dhromi i madhë) which is wide and straight and divides the town into different sections. There is also a Piazza Grande (Qaca e Madhe) which is the centre of community relationships.

The churches of the town are among the most important architectural structures, the testimony of these two styles, the baroque linked to the Byzantine Empire and Italian. Of particular interest are the works of the architect and painter Pietro Novelli, very active in the Albanian community.

=== Religious architecture ===
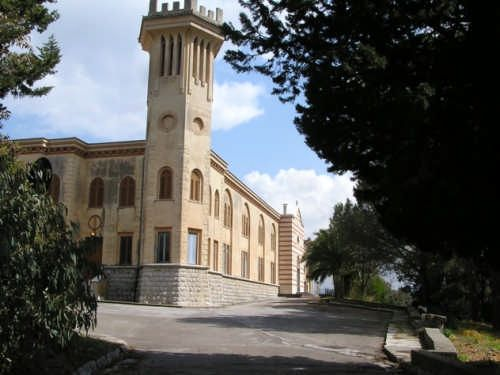
Monastery of Basilian monks (Sklica)

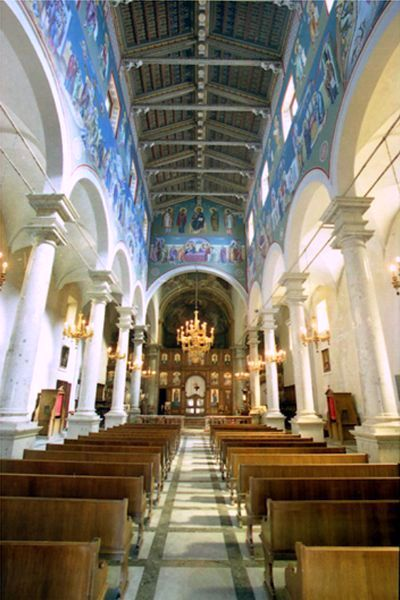
Piana degli Albanesi Cathedral

The most notable churches in Piana degli Albanesi are:

- The Cathedral of Shën Mitri Dëshmor i Math (St. Demetrius Megalomartyr), which serves as the principal church of the Eparchy of Piana degli Albanesi, the church dates to 1498/1590. The cathedral is a building dating from the late fifteenth-century, that preserves some significant frescoes by Pietro Novelli. The most ancient work is the icon of the God Mother with the Christ (1500). The presence of two cultures (Byzantine-baroque) is so evident in the place.
- Church of Shën Mëria e Dhitrjës (St. Mary Odigitria), located in the village main square, was built in 1644 in the style of Pietro Novelli. The church, the only architectural work by Novelli, has the nave divided from the two aisles by four pillars to support the octagonal dome with a small lantern. It preserves a Virgin Odigitria icon that is said to have been brought here by the refugees during their voyage from Albania.
- Church of Shën Gjergji Dëshmor i Math' (St. George), built in 1492, is the most ancient in the town. It preserves some remarkable frescoes.
- Church of Shën Kolli (St. Nicholas), an important church which houses precious icons from the seventeenth century.
- Church of Shën Viti (Saint Vito), dating back to 1514, with an imposing portal, which is Latin Catholic.
- Church of Shën Gjoni i Math (Saint John), from the 16th century, has preserved the altar to the east, typical of Byzantine architecture.

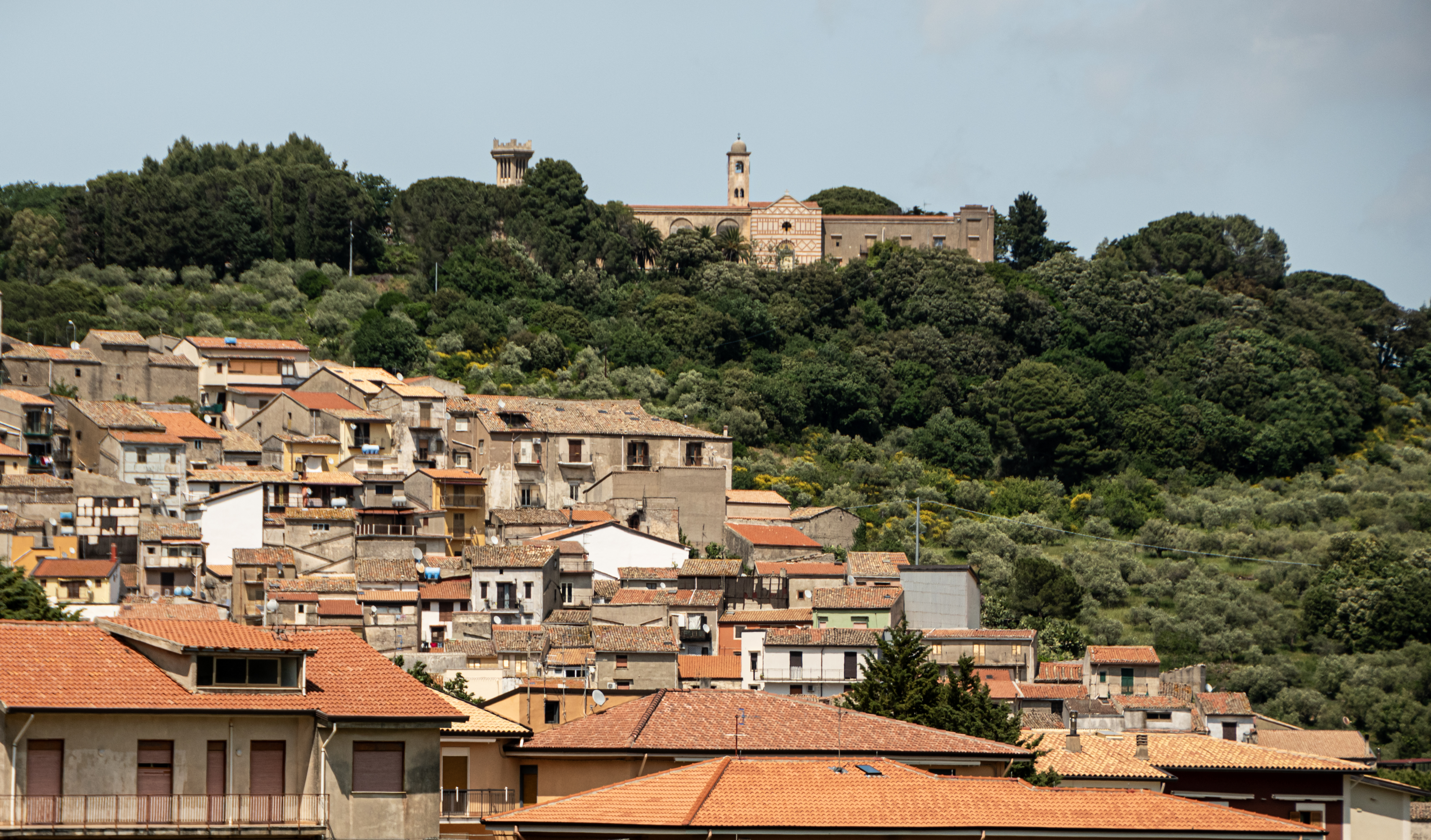
Monastery of Basilian monks (Sklica), with Piana degli Albanesi in the foreground

The Monastery of the Basilian Fathers (Sclizza or in Albanian Sklica) of the Byzantine Rite is in a panoramic spot over the town, you can admire some mosaic works by Spiridione Marino (Dhoni), a local Italo-Albanian artist. From here, it is also worth having a look at the valley below.

=== Archaeology ===
Within the confines of Piana degli Albanesi, in Contrada Sant'Agata (Shënt Arhta in Albanian), the remains of an early Christian necropolis of late Roman age, called Pirama, were brought to light in 1988. Evidence of ancient and modern cultural richness of the area, currently subject to archaeological research center.

== Religion ==
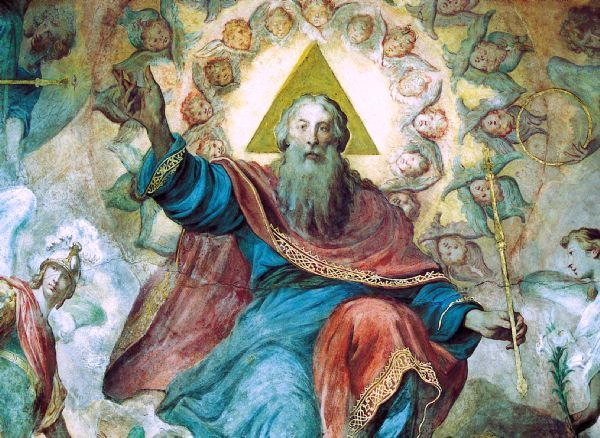
Pietro Novelli, 17th century, Cathedral, fresco depicting God the Father participating in the resurrection of Christ.

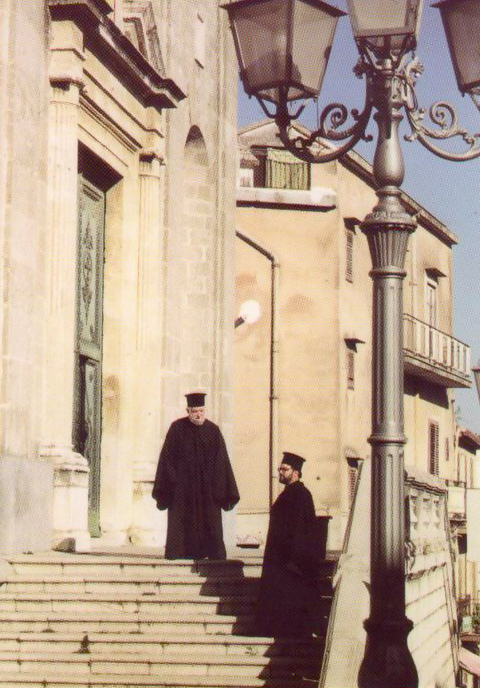
Italo-Albanian priests of the Byzantine rite

The Comune is the Episcopal see of the Italo-Albanian Catholic Church Eparchy of Piana degli Albanesi for the Arbëreshë of Sicily.

=== Easter ===
The town preserves unique Easter traditions, held every year according to a typical itinerary: first of all is the Divine Liturgy, where the Gospel is read in seven languages, including Arabic. After the religious ceremony, there is a procession through the main street, all the women and several men dress in traditional Arbëresh costume, the procession leads to the square after the blessing the red eggs are distributed as a sign of Christ's resurrection.

== Culture ==
=== Traditional costume ===
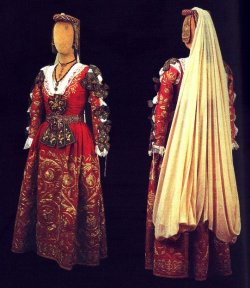
(Ncilona) Traditional Arbëresh costume worn during the Catholic-Byzantine wedding

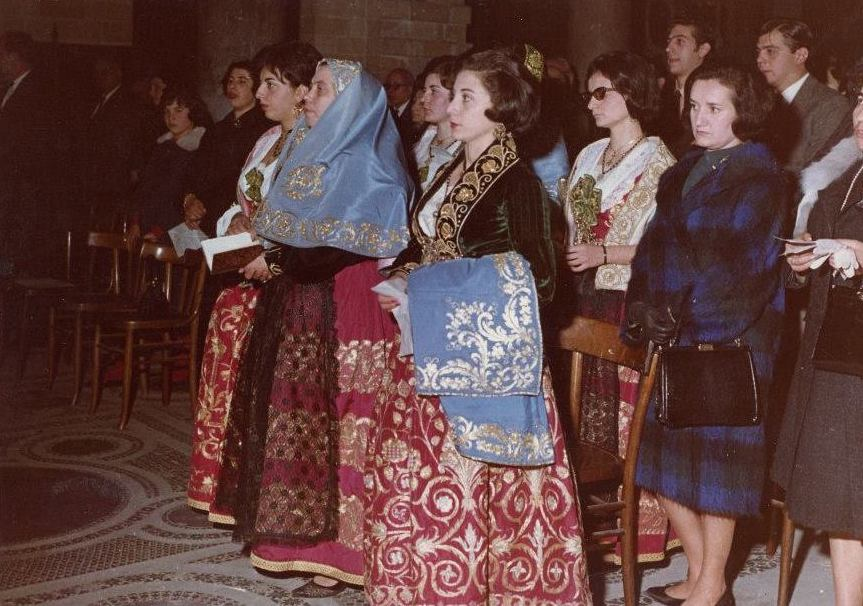
Women in traditional Albanian costume singing liturgical songs, Italo-Albanian parish of Palermo

Historical population
Year	Pop.	±%
1488	2,699	—
1589	3,699	+37.1%
1652	3,864	+4.5%
1714	4,605	+19.2%
1861	7,334	+59.3%
1881	9,033	+23.2%
1921	10,162	+12.5%
1951	7,239	−28.8%
2001	6,227	−14.0%
2011	6,010	−3.5%
2017	6,429	+7.0%
Source: ISTAT, 2017

The traditional female costume of Piana degli Albanesi, along with language and the Byzantine rite, is one of the most obvious signs of Arbëreshe cultural identity, and is a unique expression of local self-consciousness, which manifests itself in the desire to retain identity and traditions. From the historical point of view Piana degli Albanesi is one of the most notable Arbëresh communities in Arbëria and Sicily. There are several artistic works on the clothes of Albanians of Piana degli Albanesi, including very valuable Vuillier prints of the eighteenth century, and paintings by Ettore De Maria Bergler, partly preserved at the Art Gallery of the monumental complex of Sant'Anna in Palermo and other private prints, postcards and watercolors by unknown authors. Both the former, together with numerous additional representations portray and demonstrate the incomparability of the costume of Piana degli Albanesi.

The clothes, linked to the various moments of women's lives, from everyday life to marriage, punctuated the rhythms of social tradition of the past. Handed down from mother to daughter, and zealously preserved, they are no longer clothes, but costumes. The progressive loss of this link began in the 1940s, when after the war in Europe there was a need for more practical clothing.

The opulent and elegant clothes have preserved intact their special character, and are worn on special occasions such as baptisms, Epiphany, Easter and especially marriage, continuing to be carefully preserved by the women of Piana degli Albanesi. It costs thousands of euros to make and repair these costumes, and the majority of women use them on these occasions. An epitome of beauty is the bridal costume, which makes it particularly valuable and the religious event of the Byzantine rite. The quality of production is due to the great craftsmanship of the Arbëresh embroiderers in gold and silk wheelwork, velvet and gold (in leads, and lenticciole canatiglie). Embroidery is done using a pillow, a frame or a needle alone.

The traditional female costume of Piana degli Albanesi has been admired through time and consensus. In the competition held in Venice in 1928, in which costume groups from every region of Italy took part, the group from Piana degli Albanesi was awarded first prize, a recognition of their traditional dress as the most sumptuous, rich in design, fabrics and colors out of all the regional competitors.

=== Language ===
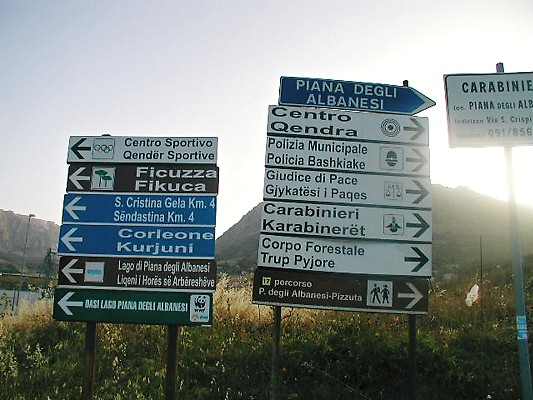
Bilingual signs in Piana degli Albanesi

The most obvious traces of the strong ethnic identity of Piana degli Albanesi is the Albanian language (Arbërisht). It is spoken by all, and can be seen in street names, road signs, and shop signs in the village. The Arbëreshë community has preserved its identity as much as possible. The language shares the widespread language variations seen in southern Albania, mixed at times with Greek phonetics. The language is recognized by the local government and primary schools as a minority ethno-linguistic language. Arbërisht remains the dominant language in the region. Piana degli Albanesi is officially bilingual; the official town documents are written in both Albanian and Italian. The citizens are bilingual, able to use both the Albanian and Italian languages.

Albanian is used in radio stations (ex. Radio Hora or Radio Jona), and especially in books and periodicals (ex. Mondo Albanese, Kartularet e Biblos, Albanica, Fluturimi i aikullës, Lajmtari Arbëreshvet or Mirë ditë).

=== Music ===
The music and chants of Piana degli Albanesi are deeply tied to religious tradition. The repertoire of sacred songs in Ancient Greek (or Koinè, lingua franca of the Eastern churches) and Albanian (common language of the community), used throughout the liturgical year of complex and detailed, is very wide. The weekly liturgies, festivals and other officiating are always adorned with a ceaseless flow of melody. The poetic and musical forms are dell'innografia Byzantine liturgical repertory of the museum system is modal theory and follows the Byzantine dell'oktòichos. In addition to these compositions, the prevailing source of educated, there are other evidences of a profane nature, strongly influenced, moreover, of the musical traditions of indigenous origin, it has a large number of popular songs, heritage still very much alive and thriving.

The transmission of the songs is, even today, almost entirely through oral tradition. For their documentary value are significant, however, also mentioned the many testimonies pentagram on the manuscript, written, since the beginning of up to 900 times closer to us, priests and monks with the aim of safeguarding the integrity of sacred tradition. The hymns of the Byzantine tradition are performed in celebrations and concerts in the "Corale di San Demetrio" and "Coro dei Papàs di Piana degli Albanesi", while the popular songs from the folk group "Dhëndurët e Arbërit". Among the many heritage, the songs are the most known are:

- Kostantini i vogëlith (Little Costantine)
- Christos Anesti
- Lazëri (Lazarus)
- Epi si chieri
- Simeon Krema
- Vajtimet (Lamentations)
- U të dua mirë (I wish for you to be good)
- O zonjë e Parrajsit (O lady of Heaven)
- Te parkales
- Një lule u deja t'isha (I wished i could be a flower)
- Kopile moj kopile (Girl you girl)
- Muaji i mait (Month of May)
- Ju lule të këtij sheshi (You flowers of this field)
- Trëndafili i shkëmbit (Rose of the rock)
- Malli çë kam për tij (The longing i have for you)
- Përçë ti rron
- Perëndesh e bukuris (Goddess of beauty)
- Kur të pash të parën herë (When i saw you for the first time)
- Për mëmëdhenë (For the motherland)
- Shkova ka dera jote (I went at your doorstep)

Although the most emblematic songs and perhaps the oldest remain:

- O mburonjë e Shqipëris (The shield of Albania)
- O e bukura More (Beautiful Morea) The most famous song dating circa 700 years ago.

=== Cuisine ===
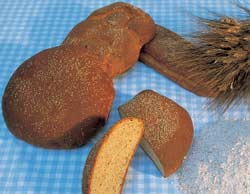
Traditional bread of Piana degli Albanesi

The local gastronomy offers dishes and desserts typical of the Sicilian-Albanian tradition, in which one can note the presence of elements deriving from the Balkans and the Mediterranean.

Albanian cuisine is very simple but tasty due to the aromas used in the dishes [110]. Local food is rich in values and flavors, with its rituals and its symbolic codes, it constitutes an element of socio-cultural identification. The manufacturing process to obtain these products is almost a ritual, which from ancient times has been handed down from father to son to the present day [111]. A complete overview of typical products, especially desserts (ëmbëlsirat), is for Easter, when all the Albanian traditions rediscover their splendid form. Piana degli Albanesi is famous for bread (bukë), olive oil (vajtë ulliri), ricotta (gjizë), cheese (udhosë) and cannoli (Kanojët) filled with candied ricotta.

Among the various typical gastronomic products we can mention: Strangujët (Gnocchi), Likënkë (Salsiccia), Grosha or Groshët, Milanisë, Grurët (Cuccìa), Vetë të kuqe (Easter red eggs), Panaret (Easter Breads), Loshkat e petullat, Dorëzët, Të plotë (Buccellati),

== Notable people ==
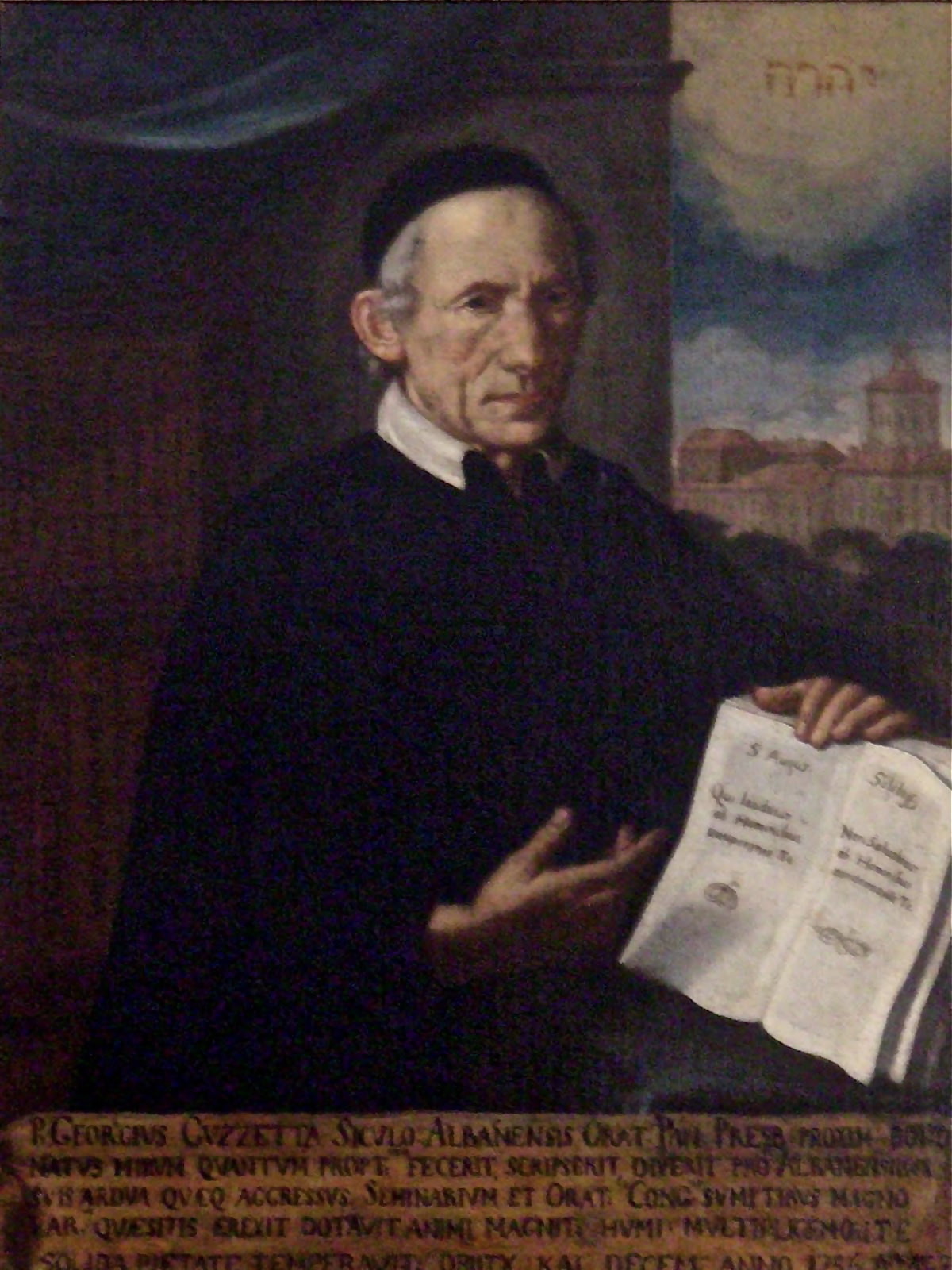
Giorgio Guzzetta (1682 – 1756)

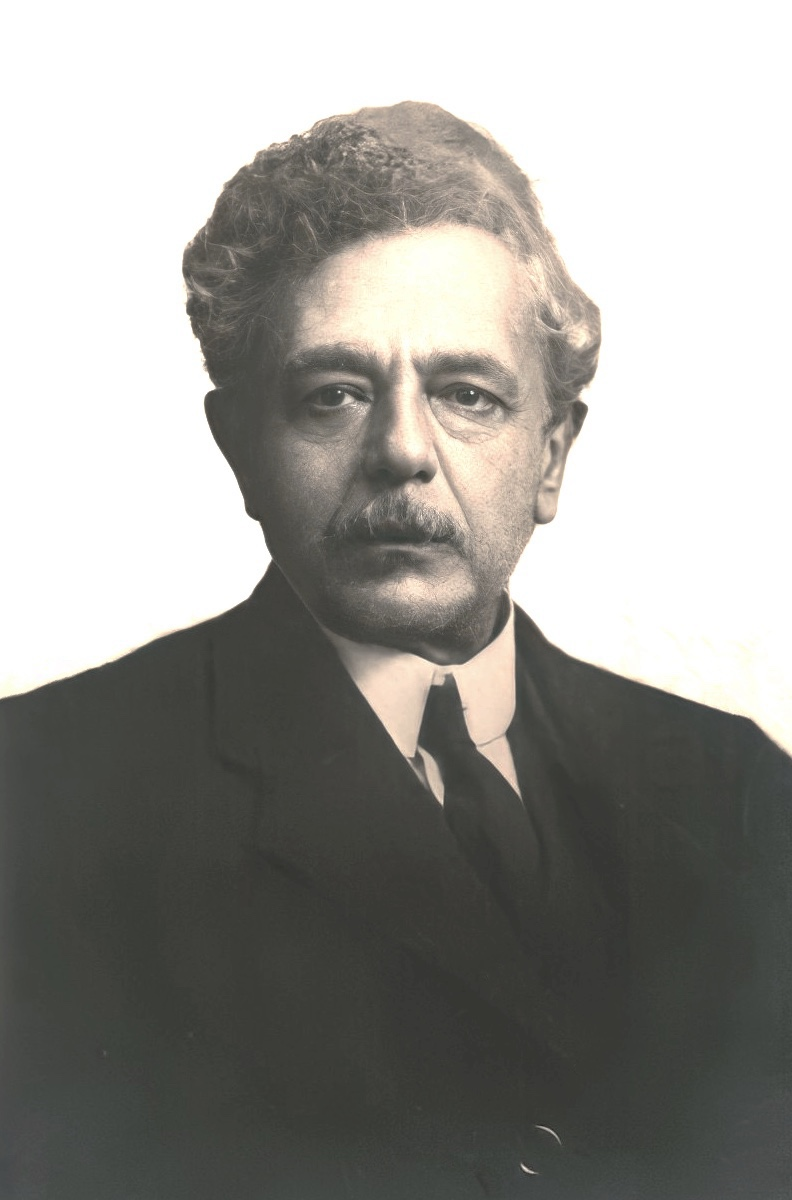
Giuseppe Schirò (1865 – 1925)

- Luca Matranga (1567–1619) priest of the Italo-Albanian Greek Catholic Church and writer who gave the official start Albanian literature in diaspora.
- Giorgio Guzzetta (1682–1756), Apostle of the Albanians in Sicily, founder of the "Italo-Albanian Seminary" and Catholic priest of Byzantine rite for the sanctity of life and apostolic works memorable.
- Giuseppe Schirò, (1690–1769) priest, writer and archbishop of Durazzo (Albanian) of the 18th century.
- Demetrio Camarda (1821–1882), priest of Byzantine rite, Albanian-language scholar, historian and philologist.
- Nicola Barbato (1856–1923), doctor and politician among the founders of the movement of the Fasci Siciliani Workers.
- Giuseppe Schirò (1865–1927), poet, historian, linguist, publicist and Albanian patriot, most representative of the Albanian literary and cultural traditions of Sicily.
- Kristina Gentile Mandala (1856-1919), writer, documenter, one of the first Albanian women writers.
- Joseph Ardizzone (1884-1931), the first boss of Los Angeles crime family.
- Francesco Cuccia (1876-1957), Sicilian Mafia boss and longtime mayor of Piana.
- Marco La Piana (1883–1958), scholar.
- Ercole Lupinacci (1933–2016), bishop of the Eparchy of Piana degli Albanesi and Lungro of the Italo-Albanian Church.
- Sotir Ferrara (1937–2017), bishop of the Eparchy of Piana degli Albanesi of the Italo-Albanian Church.
- Giuseppe Schirò Di Maggio (1944–), poet, journalist, essayist, playwright and writer, among the most influential and prolific exponents of contemporary Arbëreshë literature.

=== Honorary citizens ===
- Ismail Kadare (1936—2024), Albanian writer, poet and essayist.

== Economy ==
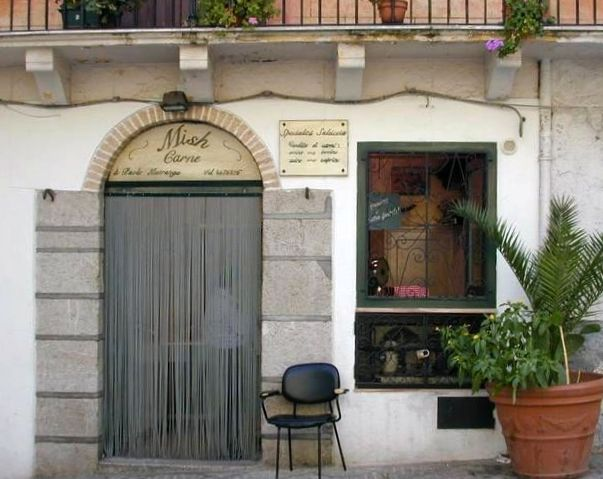
Shop with bilingual sign (Mish / Carne)

=== Agriculture ===
One of the main local resources is made from tourism, but because of the vast areas devoted to agriculture and its climate, its economy is based primarily on the production of dairy products, cereals, olive oil, wine and fruit, and by herds of sheep, cattle and goats. The office and industrial sector is thriving, the country is precisely known for the presence of accommodation such as guesthouses and restaurants that specialize in preparing dishes of those particular goods

=== Artistic and sacred crafts ===
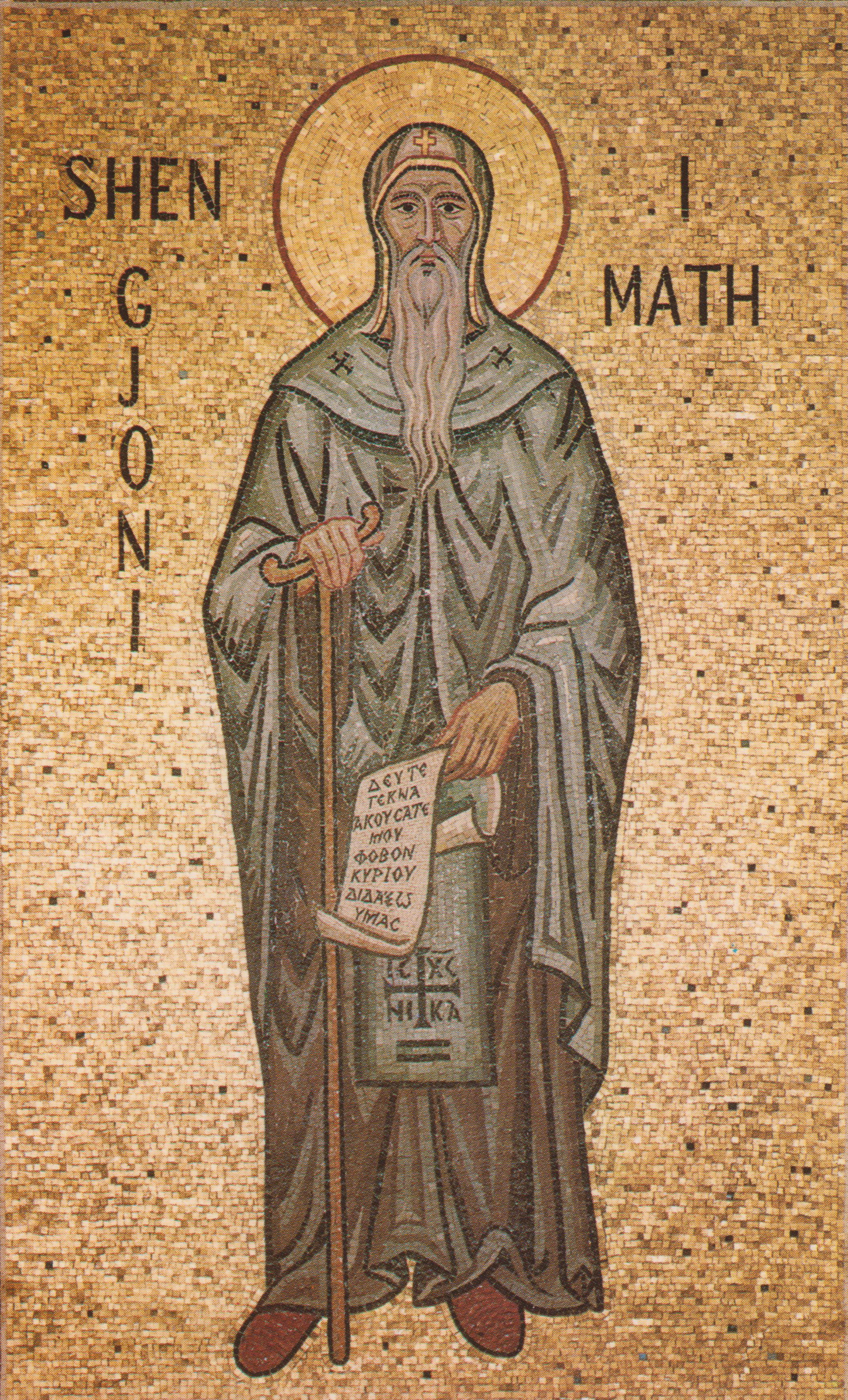
Mosaic of Saint John the Great, written in Albanian

A prestigious tradition also belongs to art and craft, including Byzantine style icons created according to the traditional canons. Modern painters of icons (religious pictures on wood) draw inspiration from Byzantine art and spirituality. Even after some centuries, they keep the tradition going in the community of Piana degli Albanesi, and are interpreters of techniques, stylist characters and use of materials, according to every detail established for centuries about this kind of art: the position of the figures, the symbolic gesture, the choice of the colours.

Embroidered with women's costumes Arbëreshë in almost continuous production for over five centuries. Other local artists are skilled goldsmiths, especially for production of costume accessories, mosaicists and craftsmen who work with local marble.

== Urban mobility ==
Interurban transport in Piana degli Albanesi is carried out with scheduled bus services managed by the Prestia e Comandè company.

== Gallery ==
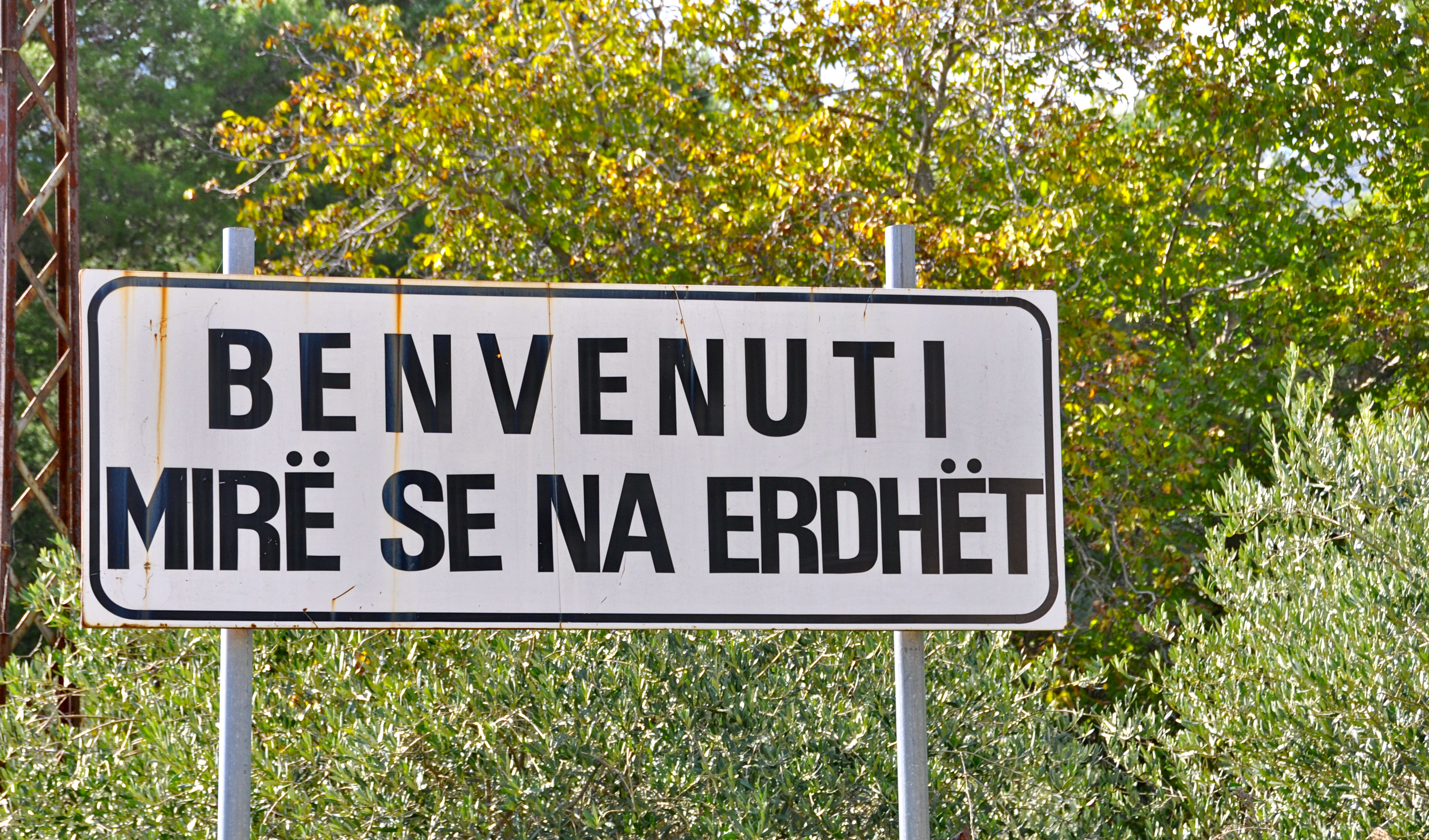
Bilingual signs in Italian and Albanian

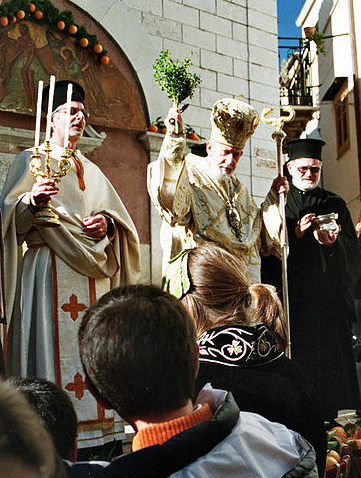
Italo-Albanian Epiphany of the Byzantine rite

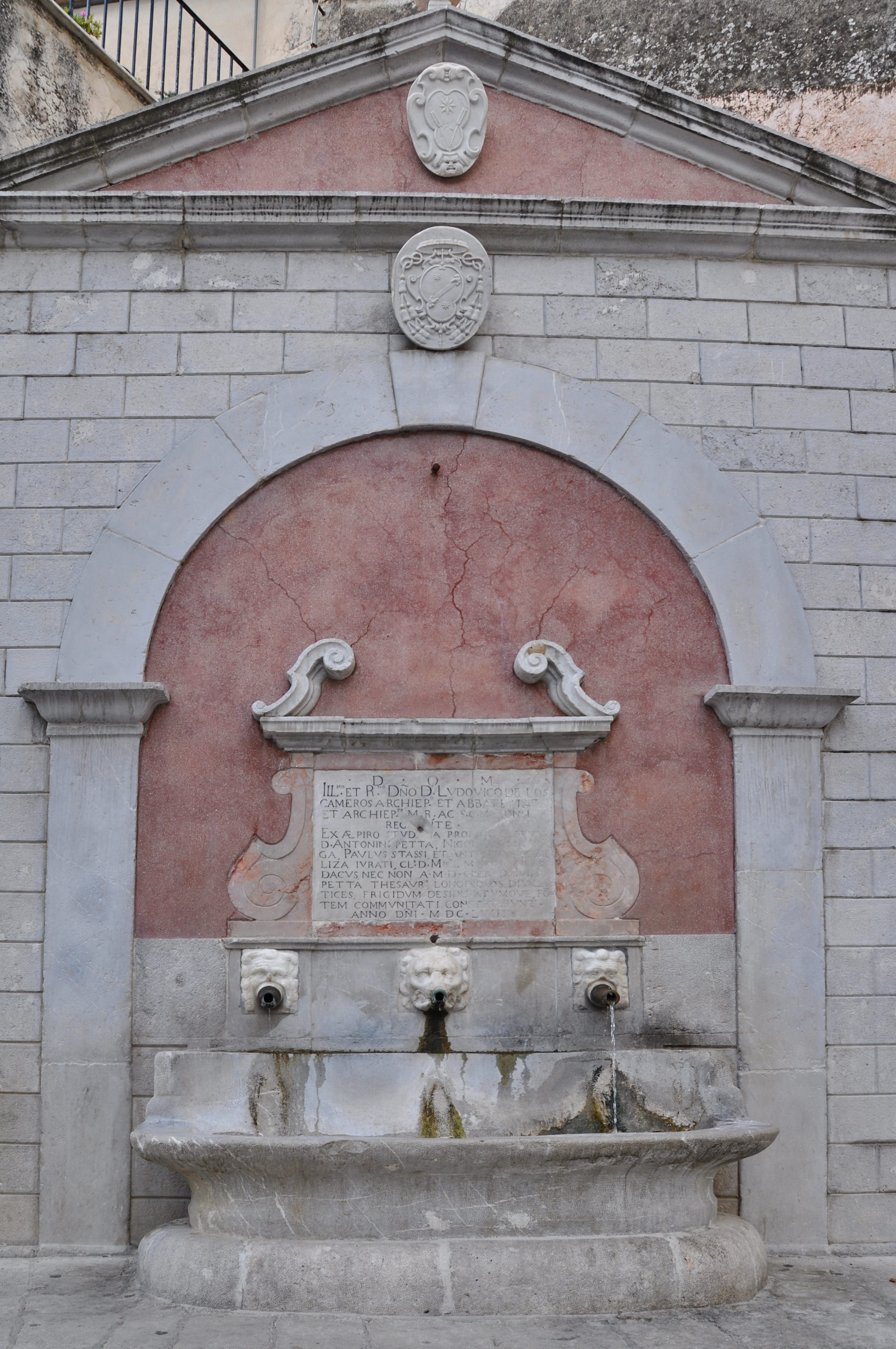
Ancient baroque fountain Tre Kanojvet in the shape of temple (1608)

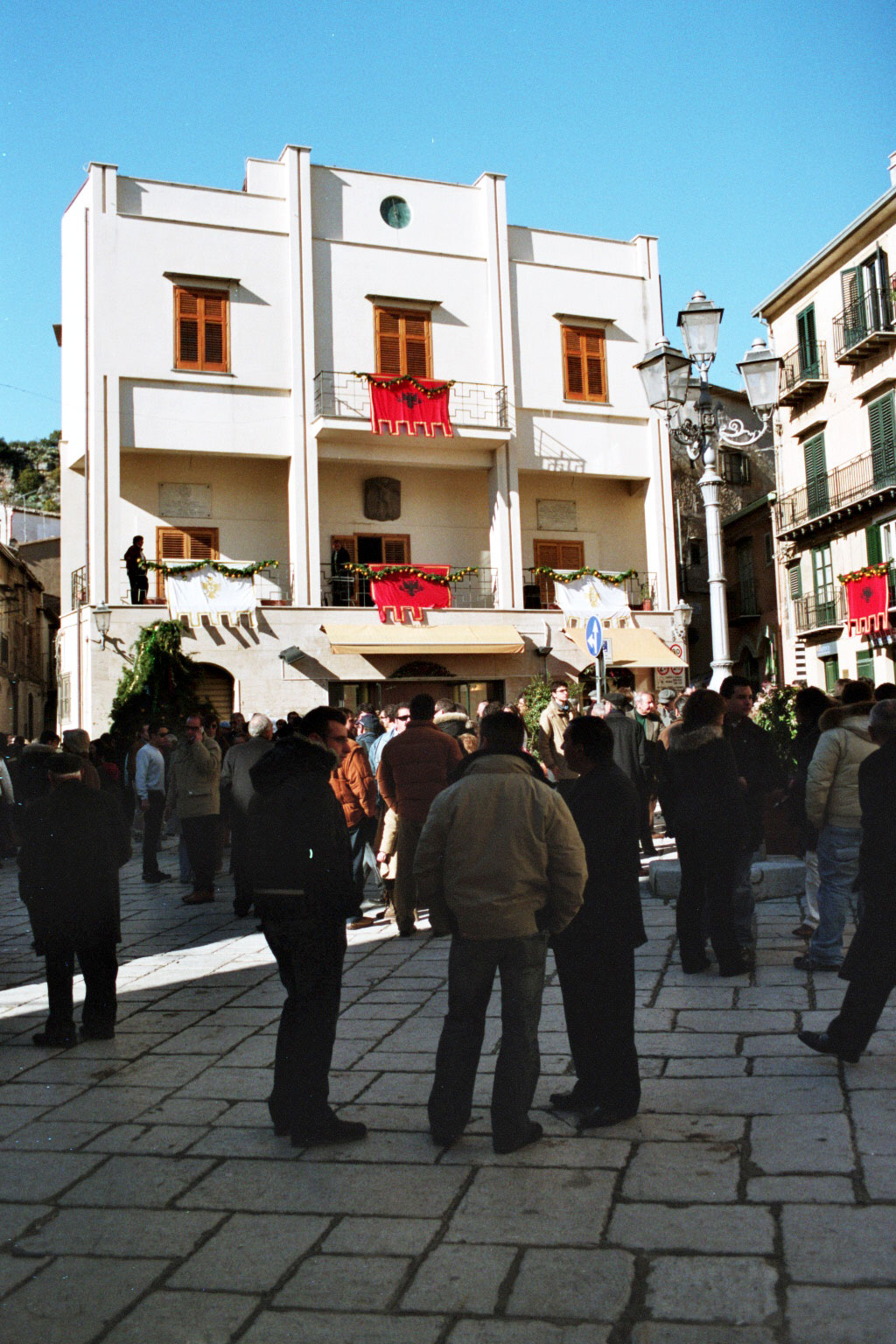
The ancient main square

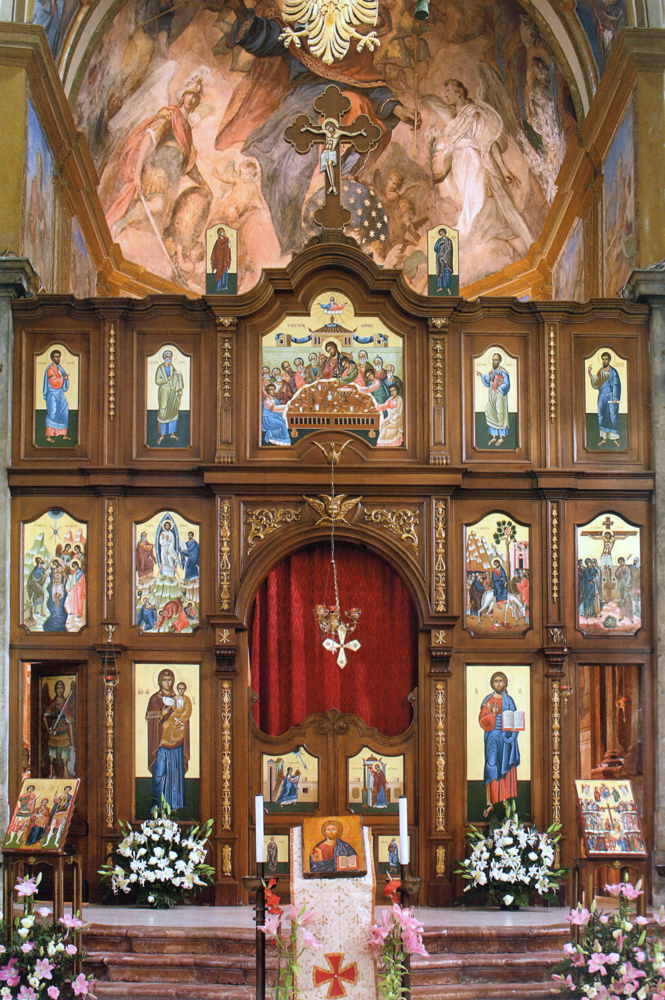
Iconostasi of the Cathedral

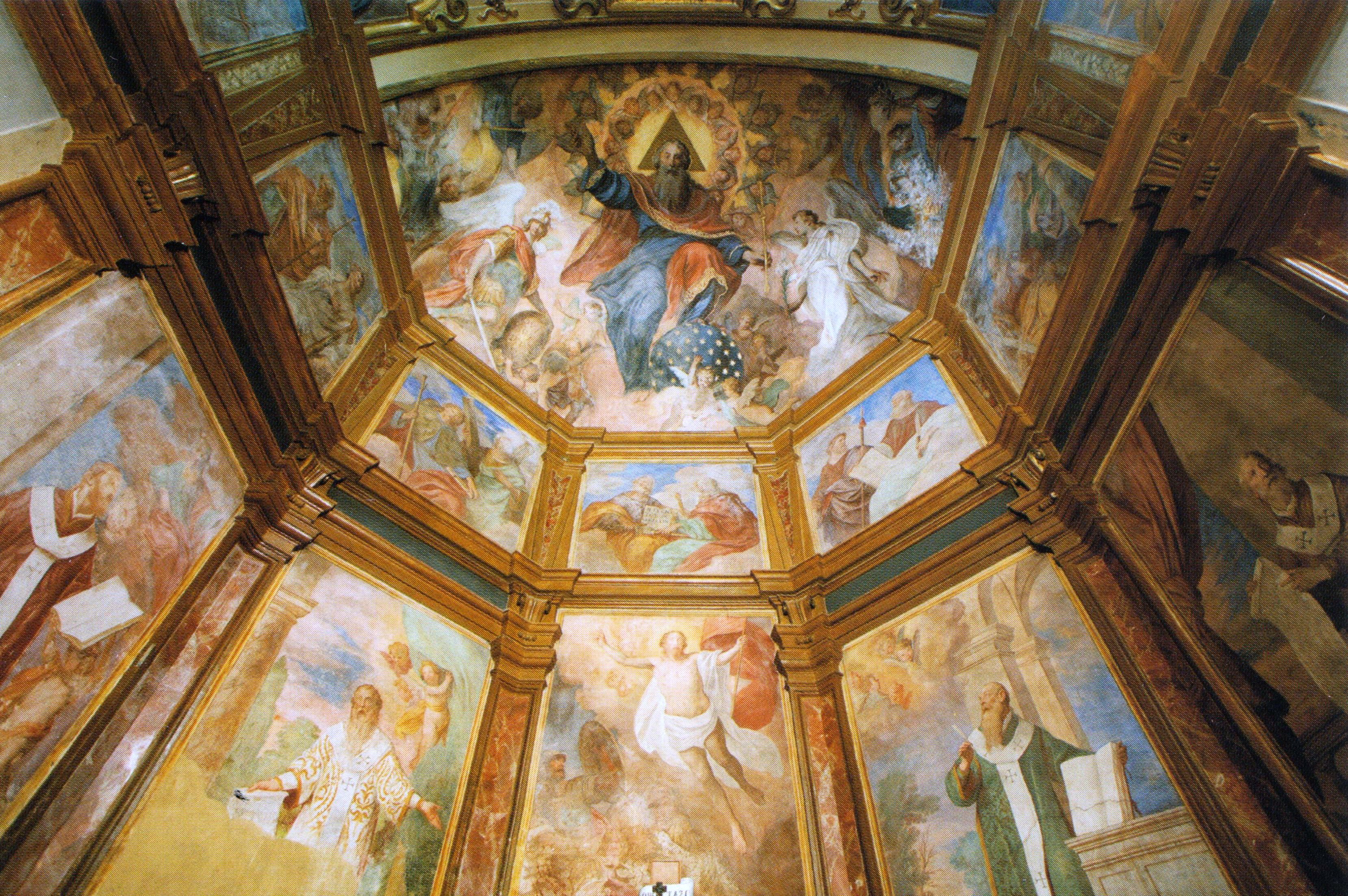
Pietro Novelli (17th century), the frescoes of the Cathedral

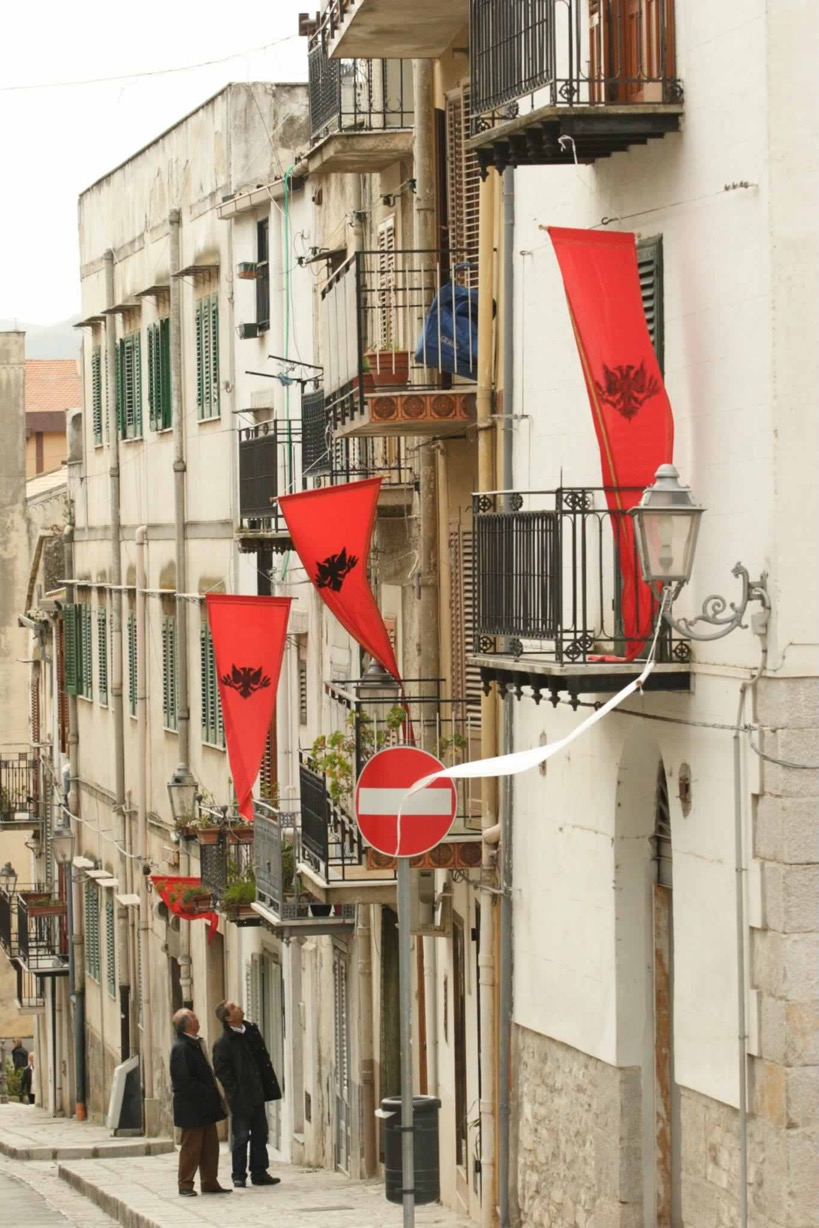
During Easter

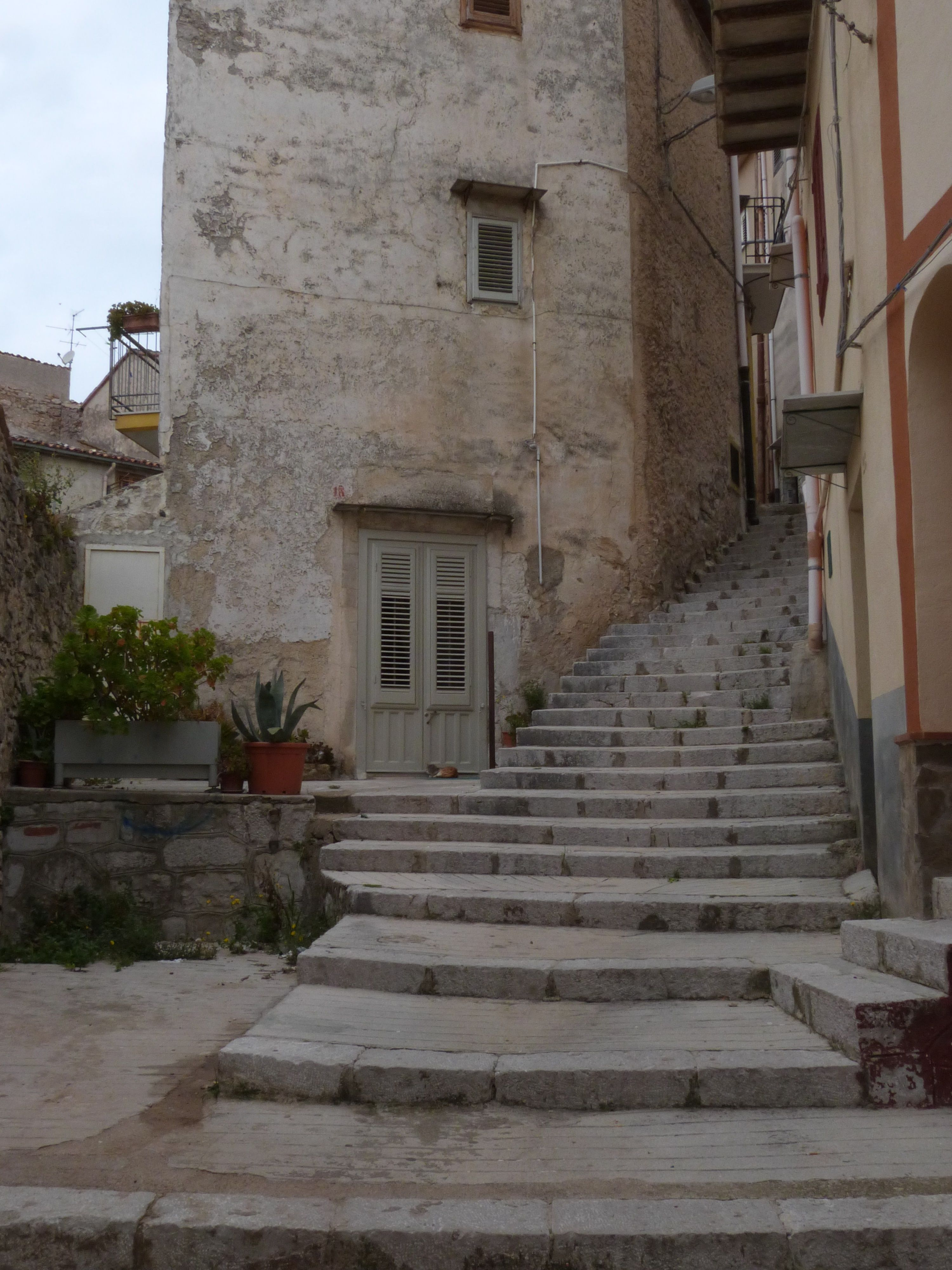
A typical street of the old town

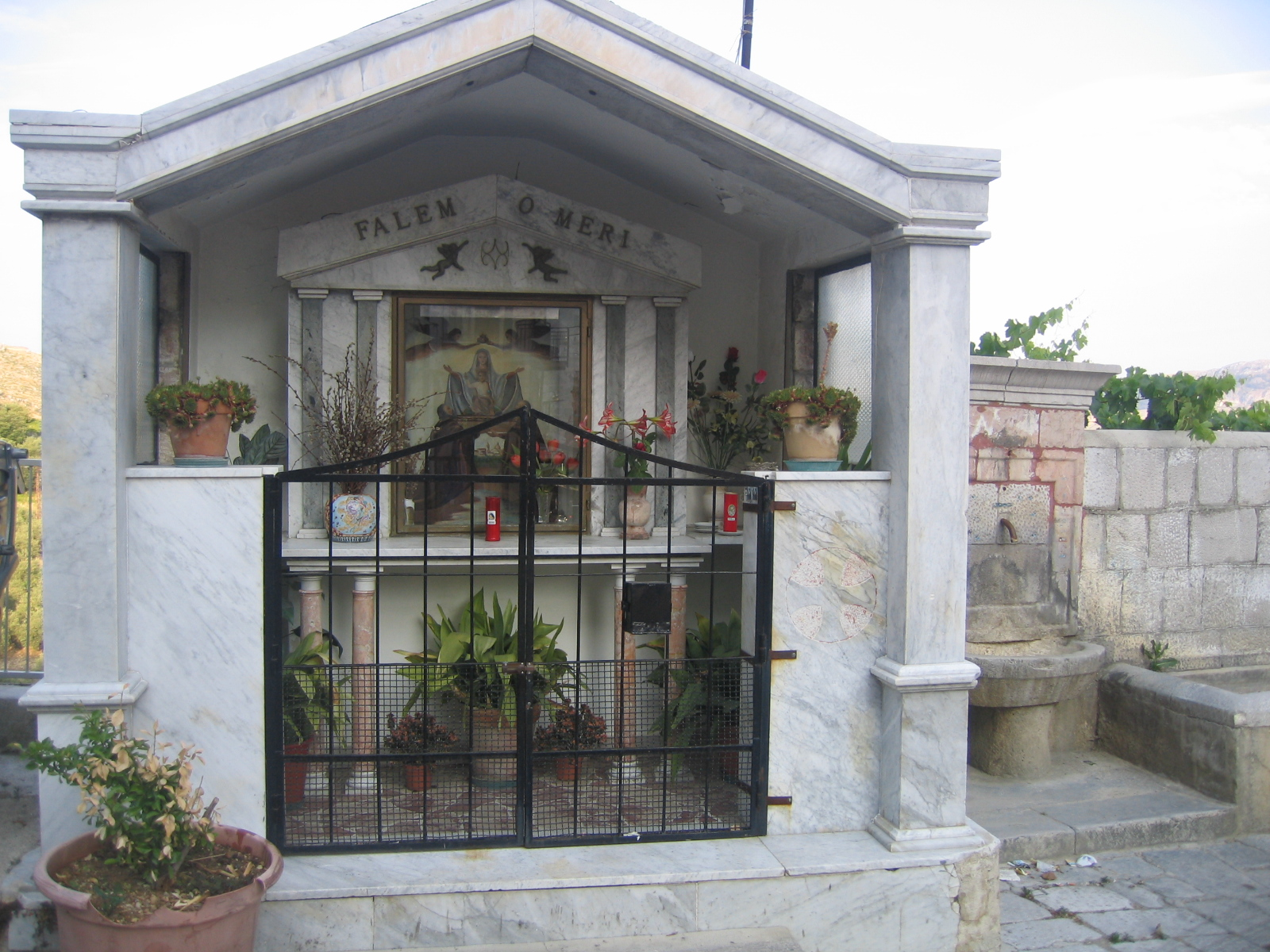
Roadside shrine showing the words "Falem O Mëri" meaning "Hail Mary" in Albanian

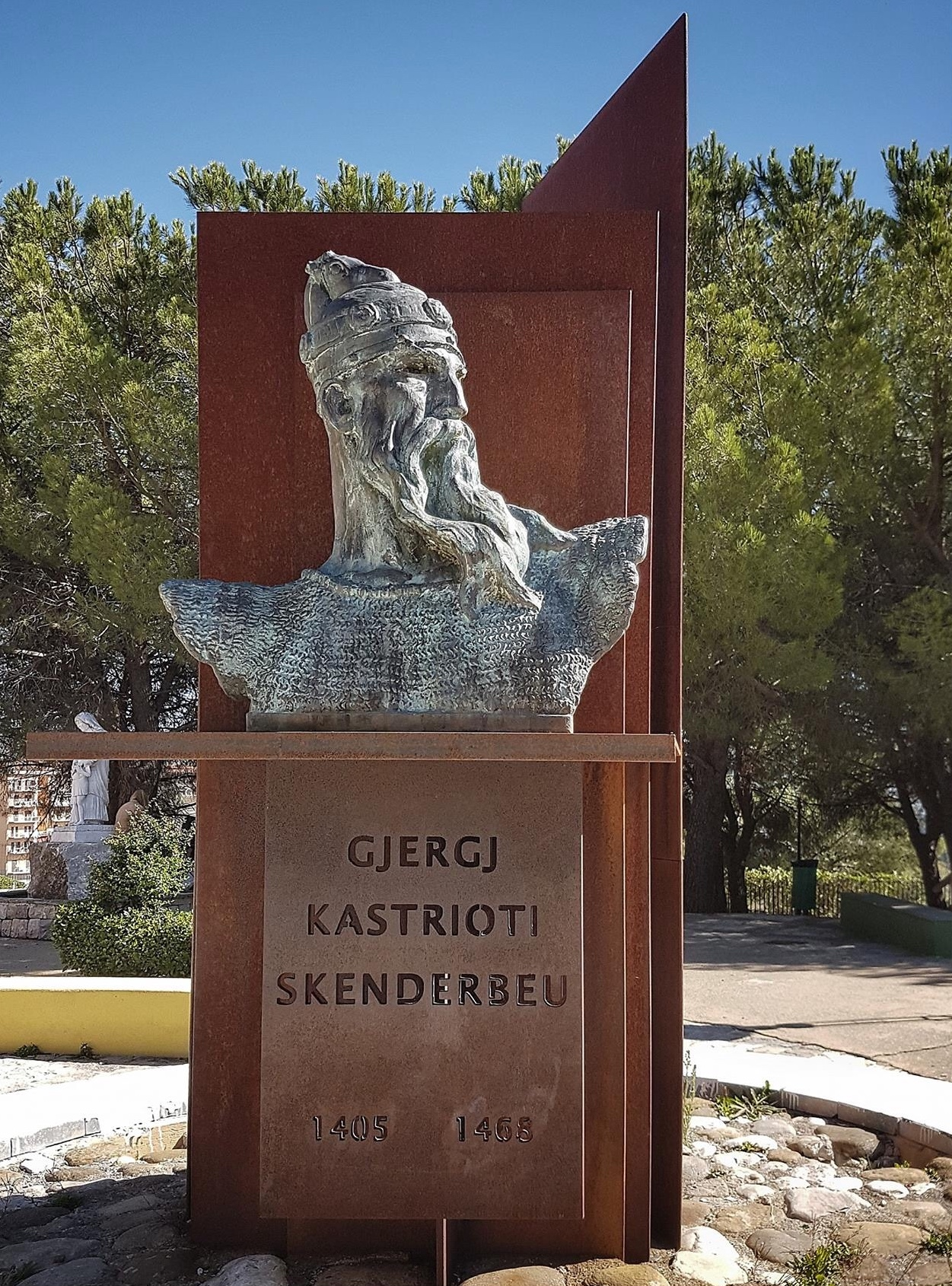
Odhise Paskali (1968), Bust of the Albanian Hero Skanderbeg, Garden Comune

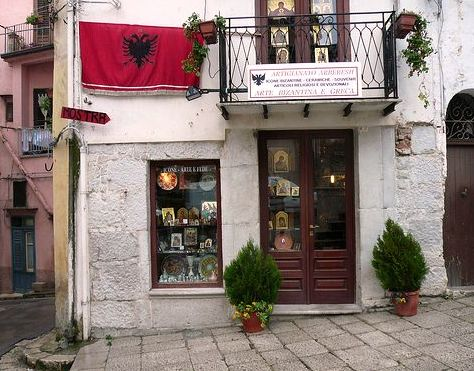
A traditional Albanian craft store

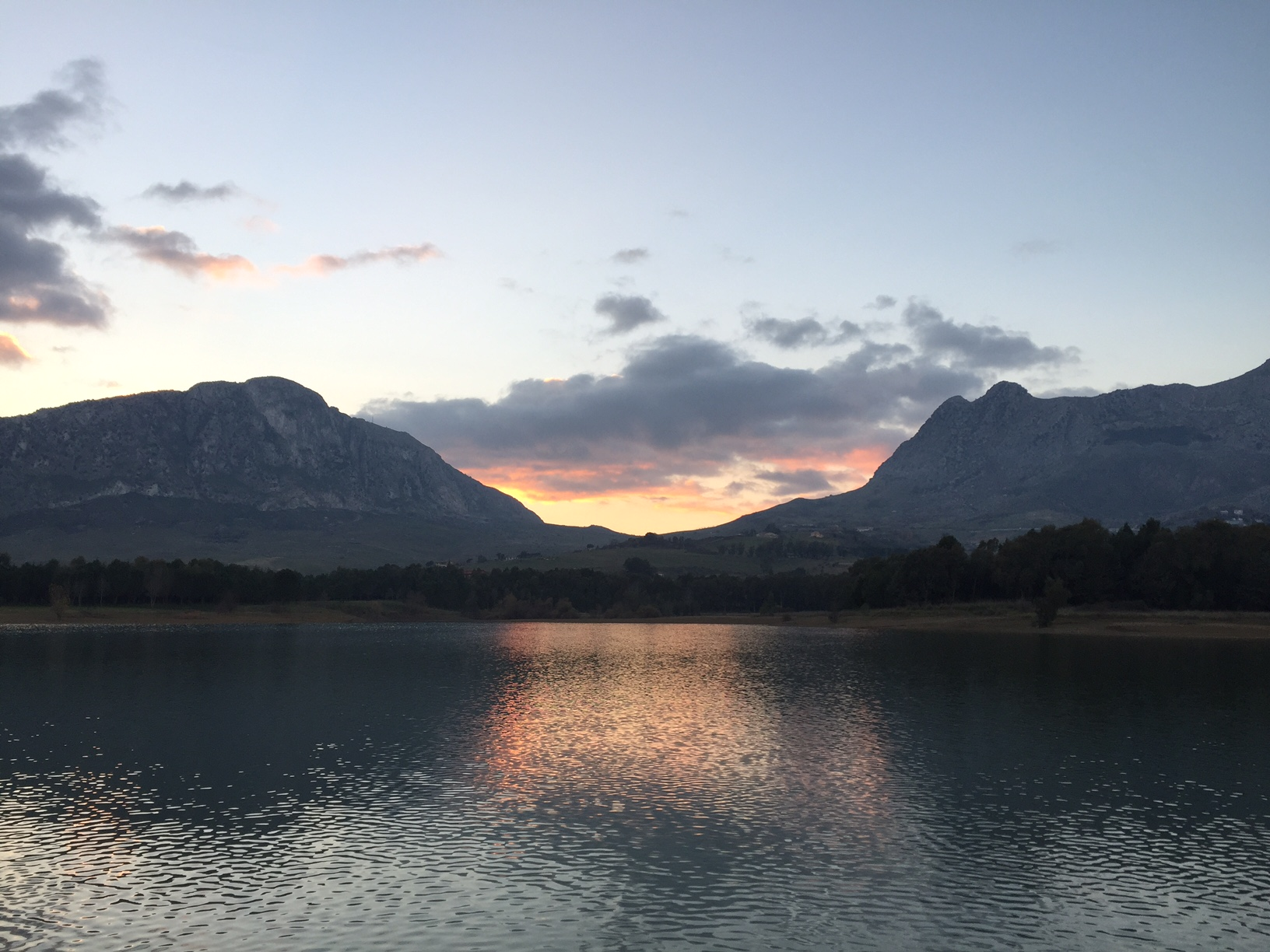
Lago di Piana degli Albanesi

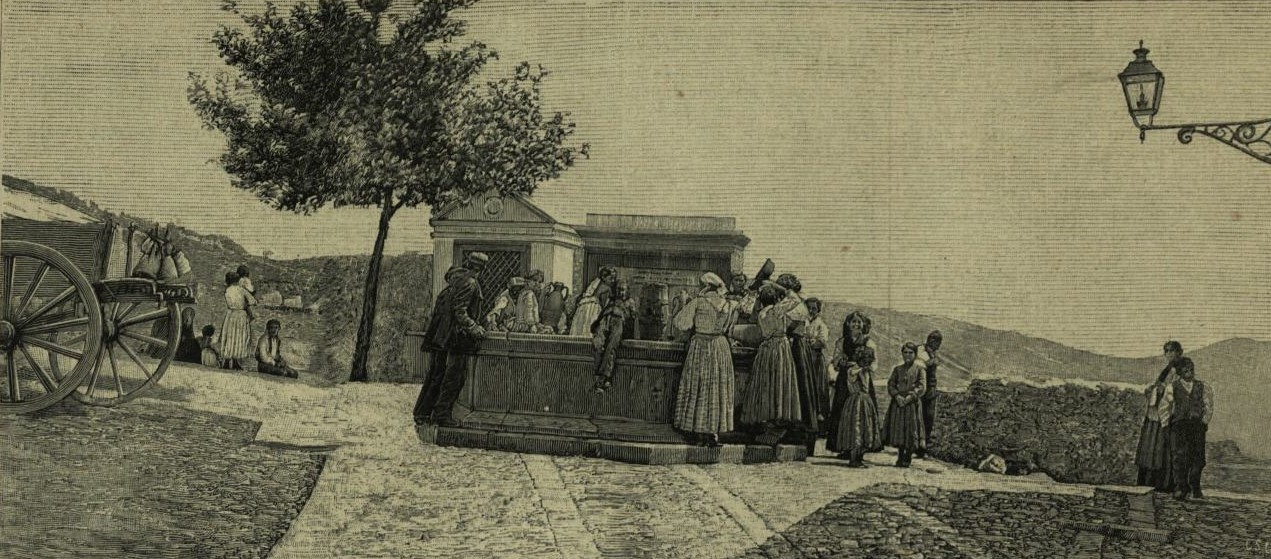
Arbëreshë with traditional clothes at the fountains of Me një gojë and Kryqa in 1894

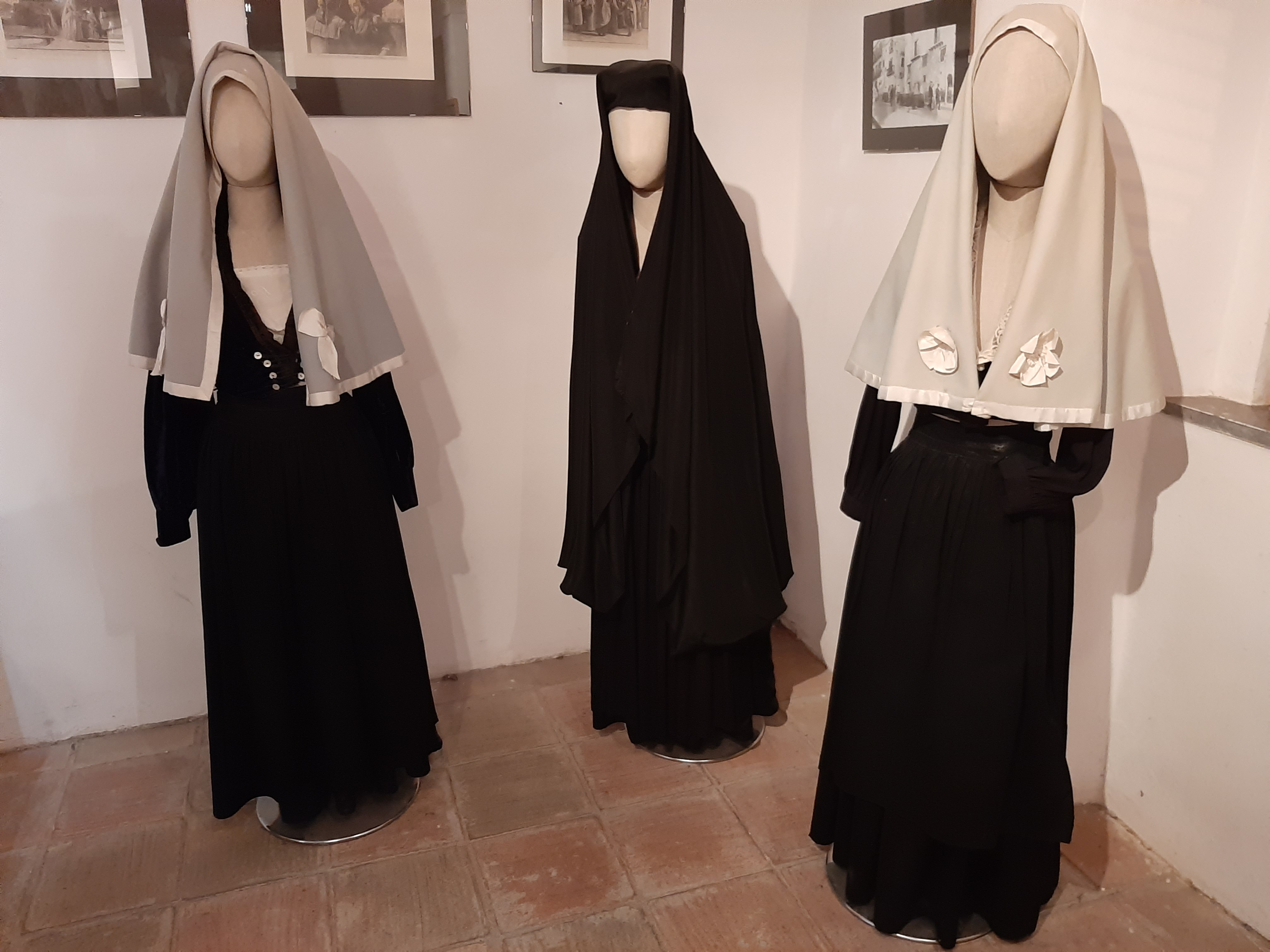
Clothes used by Arbëreshë women to lament their dead (Albanian: vajtim)

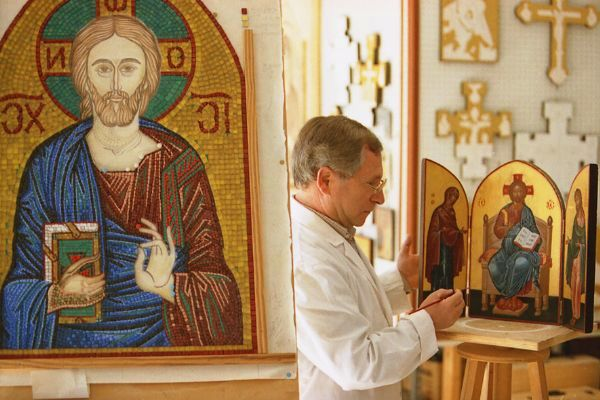
Arbëreshë icon painter

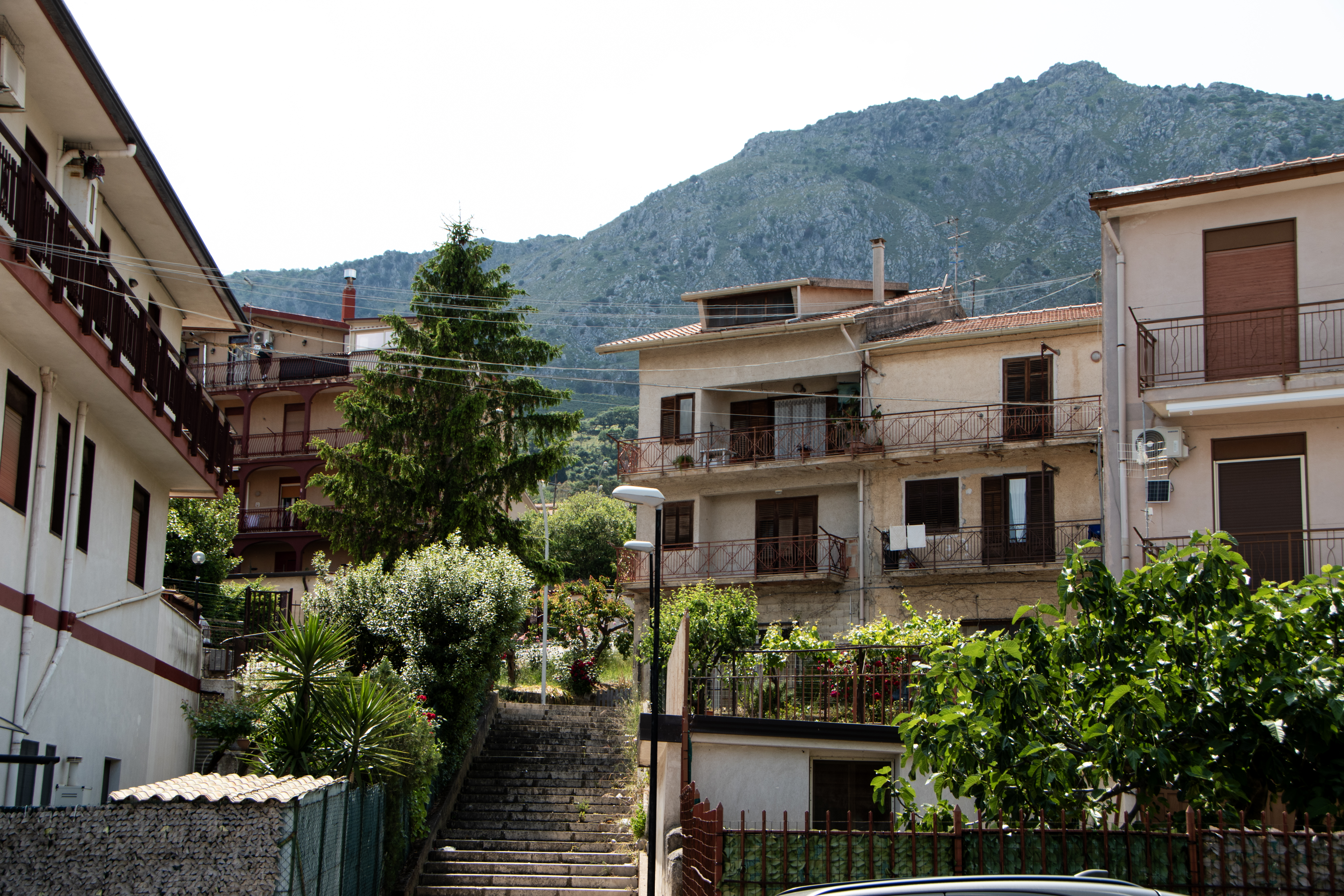
Buildings of Piana degli Albanesi with Mount Pizzuta in the background

== See also ==
- Arbëreshë people
- Byzantine Rite
- Eparchy of Piana degli Albanesi
- Lago di Piana degli Albanesi
- Portella della Ginestra massacre

== Notes ==
- Scientific article on the state language Arbëresh of Piana degli Albanesi
