= Giuseppe Schirò Di Maggio =

Arbëreshë poet and dramatist

- Zef Skiro di Maggio
- Born: 11 January 1944 (age 82); Piana degli Albanesi, Sicily, Italy
- Occupations: Writer, journalist, poet, dramatist
- Writing career
- Language: Italian, Albanian

Giuseppe Schirò Di Maggio (Arbëreshë Albanian: Zef Skiro Di Maxho; born 11 January 1944) is an Arbëreshë poet and dramatist.

== Biography ==
He was born in Piana degli Albanesi in Sicily, Italy.

He studied at the Università di Palermo. Schirò Di Maggio is currently the editor-in-chief of the magazine Albanian World (Italian: Mondo Albanese or Albanian: Bota Shqiptare), and the children's school text books Udhëtimi and Udha e Mbarë.

== Works ==
=== Poems ===
- Nëpër udhat e Parrajsit Shqipëtarë dhe t'Arbëreshë (Travelling though Albanian and Arberesh paradises) – Piana degli Albanesi, 1974.
- Lufta e mivet me brethqit (Battle of Frogs and Mice) – Piana degli Albanesi, 1975.
- Fatosat (The daring ones) – Settimo Torinese, 1977/79.

=== Poetry ===
- Sunata (Sonata), collection of poetry written 1965/'75 – Settimo Torinese.
- Më para se të ngriset (Before dusk) – Settimo Torinese, 1977.
- APKLPS, fotofjalë (APL:PS, photowords) – Settimo Torinese, 1980.
- Kopica e ndryshku (The moth and the rust) – Palermo, 1981.
- Gjuha e bukës – ed. Ali Podrimja, Rilindja, 1981 – Pristina.
- Përtej maleve prapa kodrës (Across the mountains behind the hill), ed. Nasho Jorgaqi – Shtepia Botuese "Naim Frashëri", Tirana, 1985.
- 'Vjeç të tua 500 (500 years of you) – Mondo Albanese, 1988.
- Laerti, i jati (Laert, the father) – Mondo Albanese, Piana degli Albanesi, 1989.
- Metaforë (Metaphor) – Mondo Albanese, 1990.
- Kosova Lule (Kosovo Flower) – Mondo Albanese, 1991.
- Anije me vela e me motor (Sailboat with motor) – Mondo Albanese, 1992.
- Ne pas se pencher au dehors (Do not lean out) – Mondo Albanese, 1994.
- Poezi ghushtotre e tjera (August poetry and others) – Mondo Albanese, 1995.
- Kopshti im me dritare (My garden with windows) – Mondo Albanese, 1996.
- Dhembje e ngrirë (Frozen pain), ed. Anton Nikë Berisha – Palermo, 1998.
- Gieometri dhe ikje (Geometry and escapes) – Mondo Albanese, 1998.
- Sontete (Sonnets) – Mondo Albanese, 1999.
- Poezi dashurie në kohë vdekjeje (Love poetry at a time of death) – Kosova Martire Secondo Trimestre, 1999.
- Atje kam (There I have), bilingual verses, ed. Salvatore Sciascia, Caltanissetta, 2004.
- Ishuj (Islands) – Piana degli Albanesi, 2007.
- Trimdita (Braveday) – Piana degli Albanesi, 2009.

=== Theatrical plays ===
- Dashuri magjkië (Magical love) – Mondo Albanese, 1982.
- Pethku (The legacy) – M. Albanese, 1982.
- Paja (Dowry) – M. Albanese, 1983.
- Mushti 1860 (The must 1860) – M. Albanese, 1984.
- Shumë vizita (Many visits) – M. Albanese, 1986.
- Oremira (Talisman) – M. Albanese, 1988.
- Për tokën fisnike të Horës (From the noble land of Piana) – M. Albanese, 1989.
- Investime në jug (Investments in the south) – M. Albanese, 1990.
- Mëso artën (Learn the art) – M. Albanese, 1992.
- Gjinde si tjera (People like others) – M. Albanese, 1992.
- Kërkuesit (The searchers) – M. Albanese, 1994.
- Lule të shumta ka gjinestra (Genista has many flowers) – Quaderni di Biblos, Comune di Piana degli Albanesi, 1997.
- Ujët e Rruzahajnit (Water of Ruzahajn) – M. Albanese, 1999.
- Flutura çë do fluturonjë (The butterfly that wants to fly), Piana degli Albanesi, 2005.
- Gjëndje e përkohshme (Temporary situation), Piana degli Albanesi, 2006.
