= Piana degli Albanesi Cathedral =

- Cathedral of Saint Demetrius the Great Martyr
- Cattedrale di Piana degli Albanesi
- Kryeklisha e Shën Mitrit të Madhit Dëshmor
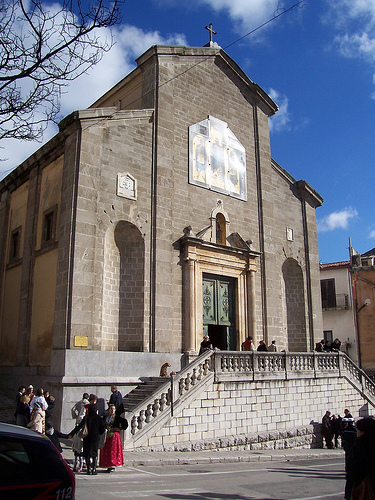
- Piana degli Albanesi Cathedral
- 37°59′47.076″N 13°17′1.68″E
- Location: Piana degli Albanesi
- Country: Italy
- Denomination: Catholic Church
- Sui iuris church: Italo-Albanian Catholic Church
- Tradition: Byzantine Rite

History
- Dedication: Demetrius of Thessalonica
- Consecrated: 1589

Architecture
- Years built: 1491
- Completed: 1644

Administration
- Province: Palermo

Piana degli Albanesi Cathedral, in full the Cathedral of Saint Demetrius the Great Martyr (Arbëreshë Albanian: Kryeklisha e Shën Mitrit të Madhit Dëshmor, or Klisha e Madhe (The Grand Church); Italian: Cattedrale di Piana degli Albanesi, Cattedrale di San Demetrio Megalomartire) is a cathedral in Piana degli Albanesi, Palermo, Italy. It is the seat of the Eparchy of Piana degli Albanesi, part of the Byzantine Rite Italo-Albanian Catholic Church.
