= Demetrio Camarda =

Arbëreshë linguist

- Dhimitër Kamarda
- Camarda on a 2023 stamp of Albania
- Born: 22 October 1821; Piana degli Albanesi, Palermo, Sicily
- Died: 13 March 1882 (aged 60); Livorno, Italy

Demetrio Camarda (Arbërisht: Dhimitër Kamarda; 22 October 1821, in Piana degli Albanesi – 13 March 1882, in Livorno) was an Arbëreshë linguist, patriot of the Arbëreshë, and publisher of Albanian folklore, with scientific knowledge also in the field of Indo-European linguistics.

Camarda, along with Girolamo De Rada were the main two initiators of the Italo-Albanian (Arbëreshë) cultural movement in Italy during the second half of the 19th century. He was the follower of the literary work already performed by Jeronim De Rada. His main work, Test of Comparative Grammar on Albanian Language is the first scientific work of comparative historic study on the topic. He made an important contribution with the publication of The Albanian general alphabet in 1869.

== Biography ==
Demetrio Camarda was born on 23 October 1821, in Piana degli Albanesi. He trained at the Italian-Albanian Seminary in Palermo, where he taught for a few years.

Forced to leave Piana degli Albanesi and Sicily because of the Army of the Two Sicilies police's strong suspicions about his feelings as a patriot and conspirator, he moved in exile to Livorno with the assignment of administering the local church of the Santissima Annunziata of the Byzantine Rite.

His Tuscan studies led to the publication of the monumental work entitled Saggio di grammatologia sulla lingua albanese (1864), in which he addressed, in an absolutely innovative way, the most pressing issues related to the diachronic study of Albanian. To write in Arbëresh he used the Greek alphabet for a time, as there was still no universally recognized standard for Albanian.

Two years later he completed his impressive scholarly endeavor by publishing the volume Appendix to the Essay on Comparative Grammatology, in which he collected, again for exclusively scientific purposes, conspicuous folkloric and literary material from all Albanian-speaking geographical areas of Italy, Greece and, of course, Albania. In the foreword to the Appendix, Camarda outlined a number of hypotheses about the formation of the Albanian folk poetic heritage that remain substantially current and valid enough to meet with the approval of contemporary scholars.

Among his other cultural activities, no lesser are his political-literary endeavors, which led him to forge fraternal friendships with leading exponents of the Albanian Rilindja (Rebirth) movement, both Italian and foreign, with whom he actively collaborated so that Albania, too, would achieve its longed-for national freedom and independence. Worthy of mention are both his essay the General Epirotic Alphabet (1869), in which he launched the idea of a common alphabet, and the volume A Dora d'Istria. The Albanians (1870), a collection of poems by various arbëreshë and shqiptarë authors dedicated to the famous Albanian patriot Elena Gjika.

Of considerable interest for the study of the history of Albanian grammatology remains the still unpublished manuscript of the Grammar of the Albanian Language.

He died an exile in 1882, aged 61. A middle school in Piana degli Albanesi is named after him.
