= List of Arbëresh settlements =

This is a list of Arbëresh towns and villages organized by their region of Italy.

== Abruzzo ==
- Villa Badessa (part of the comune of Rosciano)

== Molise ==
- Këmarini
- Munxhifuni
- Portkanuni
- Ruri

== Campania ==
- Katundi

== Puglia ==
- Kazallveqi
- Qefti
- Shën Marcani

== Basilicata ==
- Barilli
- Zhura
- Mashqiti
- Shën Kostandini Arbëreshë
- Shën Pali Arbëreshë

== Calabria ==
- Andalli
- Garafa
- Marçëdhuza
- Vena
- Firmoza
- Kantinela (in Corigliano Calabro)
- Qana
- Kastërnexhi
- Kajverici
- Çifti
- Purçìll
- Fallkunara
- Farneta
- Ferma
- Frasnita
- Mungrasana
- Ungra
- Maqi (in San Demetrio Corone)
- Allimarri (in San Benedetto Ullano)
- Pllatëni
- Shën Vasili
- Shën Benedhiti
- Picilia
- Strihàri
- Shën Mitri
- Mbuzati
- Shën Sofia
- Spixana
- Vakarici
- Karfici
- Puhëriu
- Shën Kolli

== Sicily ==
- Kuntisa
- Hora e Arbëreshëvet
- Sëndastina
