= Francesco Antonio Santori =

Albanian writer

- Born: September 16, 1819; Santa Caterina Albanese, Province of Cosenza, Calabria, Kingdom of the Two Sicilies
- Died: September 7, 1894 (aged 75); San Giacomo di Cerzeto, Cerzeto, Italy
- Occupations: writer, poet, playwright, priest
- Writing career
- Notable work: Emira
- Movement: Albanian National Awakening

Francesco Antonio Santori (Arbërisht: Françesk Anton Santori or Ndon Santori; September 16, 1819 – September 7, 1894) was an Arbëresh writer, poet and playwright. His play Emira is considered to be the first original Albanian drama ever written. The main character is a young and innocent girl who becomes a victim. Albanian literature of that time does not present many female characters like Emira.

== Life ==
Santori was born on September 16, 1819, in Santa Caterina Albanese, an Arbëreshë town in the province of Cosenza, modern southern Italy. In 1835, at the age of sixteen, he decided to become a priest and started his training for the priesthood. In 1843 he entered the Franciscan monastery of the Reformed Order in San Marco Argentano. In 1858 he unsuccessfully tried to found a monastery in Lattarico, and in 1860 he abandoned monastic life.

He continued living in Santa Caterina Albanese, where he worked as a teacher and a vendor of a spinning jenny he had constructed. In 1885, he was assigned as priest in San Giacomo di Cerzeto, a village of Cerzeto where he worked until his death on September 7, 1894.

== Work ==
During his life, Santori wrote poetry, novels, plays and short stories. He also adapted 112 of Aesop's Fables and wrote an Albanian grammar book. Santori wrote and finished his first poetry, titled Canzoniere Albanese (English: Albanian Songbook) in the 1830s and published it in 1846. Canzoniere Albanese is a long lyric poem dedicated to love and nature. The poem was influenced by Girolamo de Rada's Song of Milosao. In 1848, he composed a hymn in Albanian titled Valle haresë madhe (English: Dance of great joy), published on February 23, 1848, in De Rada's journal L'Albanese d'Italia (English: The Albanian of Italy).

In 1848, his bilingual political poem Il prigionero politico (English: The political prisoner) written in Albanian and Italian, was published in Naples. The poem recounts the changes in the life of a persecuted family during the revolutions of 1848 in the Italian states. During his years in the monastery of the Reformed Order in Cerzeto, he wrote two religious works. The first work is a religious verse titled Rozhaari i S. Myriis Virgkiyry (English: Rosary of Virgin Mary, written in Albanian and published in 1849 in Cosenza. The second one is a 230-page collection of prayers, religious texts and translations of religious songs titled Kryshten i shyityruory (English: The Sanctified Christian) published in 1855 in Naples. The Sanctified Christian contains parts of Cuneus Prophetarum published in 1685 and written by Pjetër Bogdani, one of the most important writers of early Albanian literature. Santori included excerpts of Cuneus Prophetarum in his book to symbolize the continuity of Albanian religious literature.

Santori wrote many plays, including melodramatic comedies and tragedies, some of which remain incomplete. His plays include Jeroboam, a tragedy of biblical content and Alessio Dukagino a melodrama written between 1855 and 1860, recounting the life of Lekë Dukagjini, an Albanian prince who fought against the Ottoman Empire. His best-known play, Emira, titled after the name of its central figure, is considered to be the first original Albanian drama ever written. The drama recounts the adventures of Emira, Kalina, Albenci, and Mirjani during a social revolt in Calabria, and the life in the Arbëreshë communities. Some parts of the play were published originally in the journal Fjamuri Arbërit (English: The Albanian Flag) and later in Jeronim de Rada's Albanian Anthology. In modern years, 1,845 lines of satirical verse written by Santori have been found.

Most of Santori's novels and short stories were published after his death in 1894. His novels include Sofia Kominiate, an unfinished novel written in two versions. The first version contains 282 pages and is written in Albanian, while the second version, written in Italian, contains 714 pages. No copies have survived of his novel Bija e mallkuar (English: The Cursed Daughter) written in Albanian. He also wrote the novel Il soldato albanese (English: The Albanian soldier) in Italian. Santori wrote many short stories known by the names of their central figures. His short stories written in Albanian include: Brisandi Lletixja e Ulladheni, Emilja, Fëmija Pushtjerote, Filaredo, Gnidhja e Kusari, Kolluqi e Sorofina, Miloshini, Neomenia, Panaini e Dellja, Rosarja, and Virgjinia.

== Influences and style ==
Santori's works are written in an archaic form of Tosk Albanian and are generally more accessible to the audience despite his orthographic style. In his works he uses his own spelling system without any phonetic accuracy. Common themes in Santori's works include rural life, the period of the League of Lezhë of Albanian history and the customs of Arbëreshë communities. His political poems contain moralistic motifs describing the central ideas and feelings of the characters of each poem. In several of his poems like Dance of great joy Santori describes folkloric elements of Albanian culture like folk songs and dances.

== See also ==
- Arbëreshë
- Albanian literature
- Albanian National Awakening
- Girolamo de Rada
