= Albanians in Italy =

Ethnic group in Italy

Shqiptarët në Itali Albanesi in Italia

Total population
- 441,027 - 800,000 (2019) (first figure does not include Italian Arbëreshë or Kosovar citizens)

Regions with significant populations
- Emilia-Romagna; Lombardy; Tuscany

Languages
- Albanian (Arbëreshë); Italian

Religion
- Christianity; Islam; Irreligion

Related ethnic groups
- Albanians; Albanian diaspora

The Albanians in Italy (Italian: Albanesi in Italia; Albanian: Shqiptarët në Itali) refers to the Albanian migrants in Italy and their descendants. They mostly trace their origins to Albania, Greece and since recently to a lesser extent to Kosovo, North Macedonia and other Albanian-speaking territories in the Balkan Peninsula. As of 2019, there were 441,027 Albanian citizens living in Italy, one of the largest Albanian immigrant population in any country as well as the second largest immigrant group within Italy. They are adherents of different religions and are Catholics, Orthodox, Protestants, Sunnis and Bektashis as well as various forms of Irreligion. Between 2008 and 2020 more than 250,000 Albanians acquired Italian citizenship.

The Albanians in Italy may include among others a long established Arbëreshë population in Apulia, Basilicata, Calabria, Sicily and across Southern Italy as well as Albanians to have migrated to Italy from any territory with an Albanian population in the Balkans and any person originally from the Republic of Albania. Together with Albanians in Italy were the Aromanians/Vlachs who were considered "brothers" by Albanians.

There is an Albanian community in southern Italy, known as Arbëreshë, who had settled in the country starting with the 15th and the 16th century and later, displacement expansion of the Ottoman Empire. Some managed to escape and were offered refuge from the repression by the Kingdom of Naples and Kingdom of Sicily (both under Aragonese rule), where the Arbëreshë were given their own villages and protected. The Arbëreshë were estimated as numbering at a quarter million in the year 1976.

== History ==
=== Medieval period ===
The Italian Peninsula across the Adriatic Sea has attracted the Albanian people in the Balkan Peninsula for more than half a millennium often due to the immediate proximity which was also seen as the primary gateway to Western Europe. The medieval ancestors of the Arbëreshë people were the first Albanian people to migrate to Italy historically as mercenaries in the services for the kingdoms of the Neapolitans, Sicilians and Venetians.

During the 14th and 16th centuries AD, groups of Albanians started to settle in the Italian Peninsula. Their migration stemmed from severe political and social oppression and persecution of Greeks after the death of Scanderbeg and later following the Ottoman conquest of the Balkans. Most of these medieval Albanian migrants were descended from Tosk Albanian settlers from Epirus which originally was an Albanian inhabited territory based on linguistic and genetic evidence.

Skanderbeg's Italian expedition played a major role in the increase of the Albanian population of Italy. In 1459 he revived 15 Illyrian and Messapic villages in Apulia. The Illyrians, whose language, researchers suggest, bore striking resemblances to Albanian, had several settlements in Apulia dating back to the 4rth century BC.

=== Modern period ===
As a consequence after the collapse of communism in Albania in 1990, Italy had been the main migration target for the Albanian people leaving their country. This exodus was fueled mainly by social and economic instability, a looming fear of civil war and lack of confidence in the democratization process of Albania.

Watching Italian television, which was banned during the communist era, also increased the tendency for people with university degrees to emigrate to Italy.

Around 3 weeks after the overturning of the regime, in March 1991, approximately 25,700 Albanians crossed the Strait of Otranto into Italy. Subsequently, in August 1991, another 20,000 migrants arrived in Bari Harbour aboard the Vlora. The Italian government classified such Albanians as “illegal economic migrants” and started repatriating them after a period of detention in special camps in Southern Italy. Albanian attempts to immigrate by sea caused the Italian government to deploy a considerable number of Italian soldiers along the coast of Puglia - directly facing Albania.

Italy had been a symbol of the West for many Albanians during the communist period, because of its geographic proximity. Additionally, Albania's past status as an Italian colony might have fueled immigration efforts into Italy specifically. There is also a linguistic connection similar to what attracts Romanians to Italy, as the Albanian language, although not itself Romance, has a large amount of vocabulary of Romance origin like English or Maltese. Italy reacted to this migration pressure by introducing the "Martelli" law, stipulating that any immigrant who could prove that he or she had come into the country before the end of 1989 be granted a two-year residency permit.

The perception of Albanian immigrants by Italian citizens in the period was overwhelmingly negative. Italian media in the 1990s played a large part in devaluing and inferiorizing the Albanian immigrants. A quantitative analysis of the frequency of words occurring in news articles within the early 1990s revealed that articles mentioning Albanians were positively correlated with the occurrence of words conveying negative sentiment. Therefore, articles mentioning Albanians were more likely to have news about organized crime and other activities with an illicit connotation. There were also instances where newspapers propagated misinformation: such as linking the cholera outbursts in Bari with the inflow of refugees from Albania.

From March 1997 following the outbreak of the Albanian unrest, Italy instituted a strict patrol of the Adriatic in an attempt to curb Albanian immigration. As a result, many Albanian immigrants in Italy do not have a legal status. Out of an estimated 150,000 Albanian immigrants in Italy in 1998, only some 82,000 were registered with authorities. In total there are 800,000 Albanians in Italy. Italy also took efforts to alleviate the plight of Albanians in Albania. As a response to the Albanian political and refugee crisis in April 1997, in association with the United Nations, Italy led Operation Alba, a military-humanitarian mission involving 6000 Italian personnel. It was undertaken in order to deliver aid to the Albanian people.

The Italian Government has housed significant numbers of Albanians from Kosovo in the Arbëresh settlements, most notably in Piana degli Albanesi in Sicily.

== Demographics ==
=== Population ===
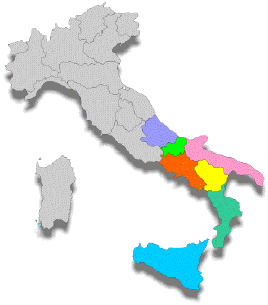
The regions of Italy with notable Arbëreshë concentration.

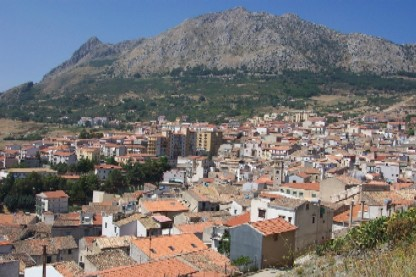
Piana degli Albanesi is one of the Arbëresh settlements in Sicily.

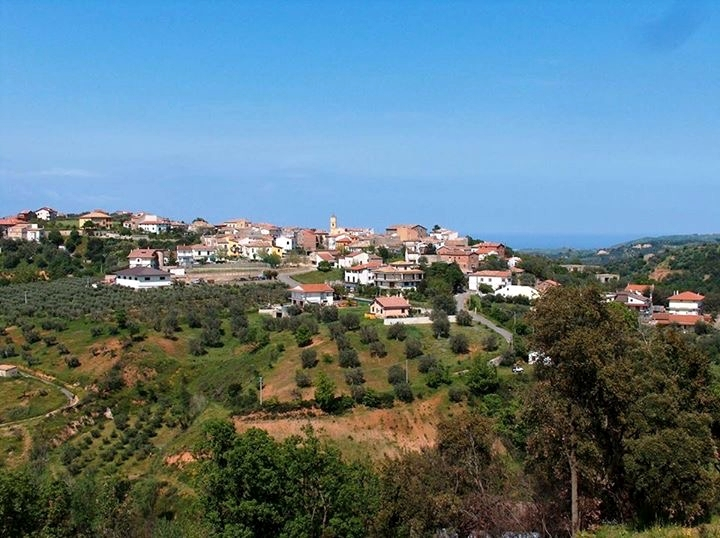
Santa Sofia d'Epiro in Calabria.

The regions with the most significant concentration of the modern Albanian population are Emilia-Romagna, Friuli-Venezia Giulia, Lombardy, Tuscany, Piedmont and Veneto predominantly in the northeastern, northwestern and central region of Italy. The least number are to be found in Aosta Valley, Basilicata, Molise and Sardinia. Though in contrast, the medieval Albanian population is geographically distributed in Basilicata, Calabria and Sicily mostly in southern region of Italy.

The Albanian population of Italy, only the Albanians with Albanian nationality, has noted a steady increase in the recent years especially during the fall of communism in the 1990s and the beginnings of the 21st century. It has doubled between 2003 and 2009 from 216,582 to 441,396 constituting a total increase of 103,8%. During the period between from 2014 to 2018, the population decreased by approximately 11% from 482,627 to 440 465.

This decrease can be explained by noting that between 2008 and 2020 more than 250,000 Albanians acquired Italian citizenship; thus, now they are counted as Italians and not as Albanians on Italian statistics .

The distribution of Albanians (foreigners only) in Italy as of 2019:

Region	(Albania) Albanian nationals	(Kosovo) Kosovan nationals
Aosta Valley	735	5
Abruzzo	11,830	1,612
Apulia	22,733	185
Basilicata	1,956	13
Calabria	2,940	62
Campania	7,064	136
Emilia-Romagna	57,969	2,470
Friuli-Venezia Giulia	9,588	3,519
Lazio	24,454	1,827
Liguria	21,866	393
Lombardy	92,332	8,400
Marche	15,863	917
Molise	807	173
Piedmont	40,919	622
Sardinia	682	37
Sicily	9,062	79
Toscana	62,066	5,608
Trentino-Alto Adige/Südtirol	11,310	3,273
Umbria	13,093	644
Veneto	33,758	10,533
Italy	441,027	40,508

=== Religion ===
The Albanian people and so the Albanian people of Italy traditionally adhere to different religious faiths and beliefs. They are traditionally both Christians and Muslims, Catholics and Orthodox, Bektashis and Sunnis but also to a lesser extent Evangelists, Protestants, Jews or non-religious, perhaps constituting the most religiously diverse people of Europe.

One religious group unique to Albanians in Italy is the Italo-Albanian Catholic Church, created for the Arbëreshë people

In the years 2011 and 2012 the ISTAT made a survey regarding the religious affiliation among the immigrants in Italy, the religion of the Albanian people in Italy were as follows:

- Muslims: 41.5%
- Christians: 38.7%
- Non religious. 17.8%
- Other religions: 1.7%

== Notable people ==
Selected people:

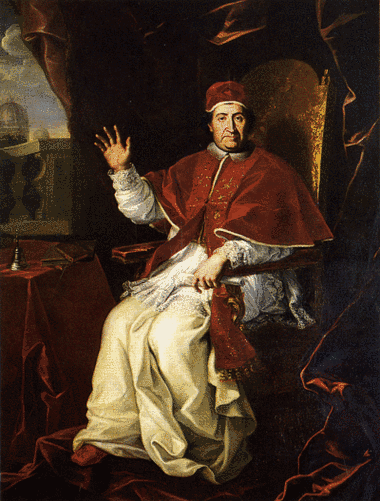
Pope Clement XI

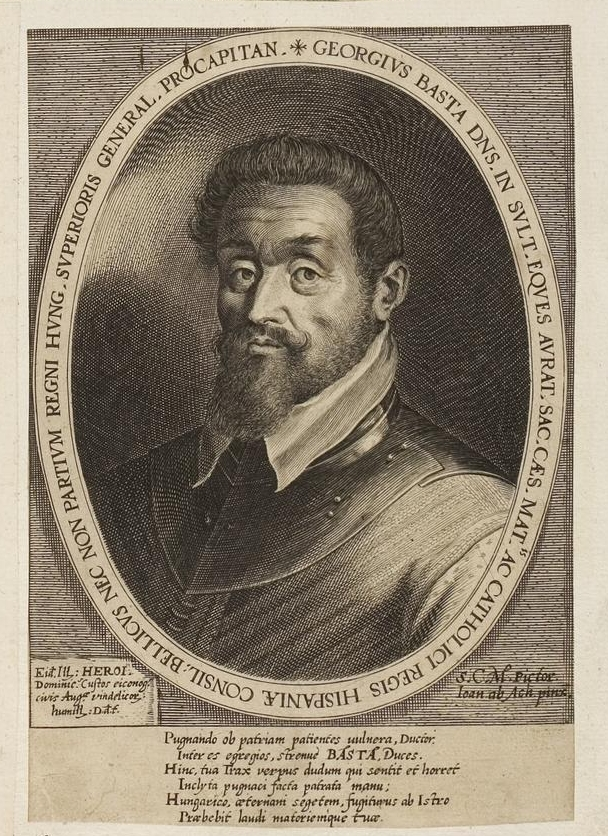
Giorgio Basta

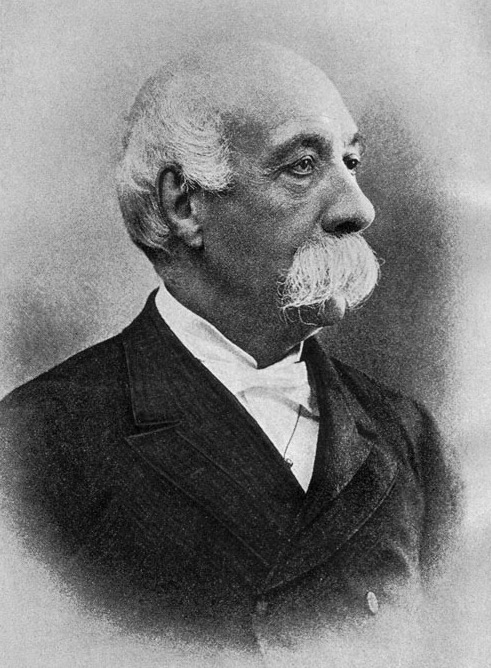
Francesco Crispi

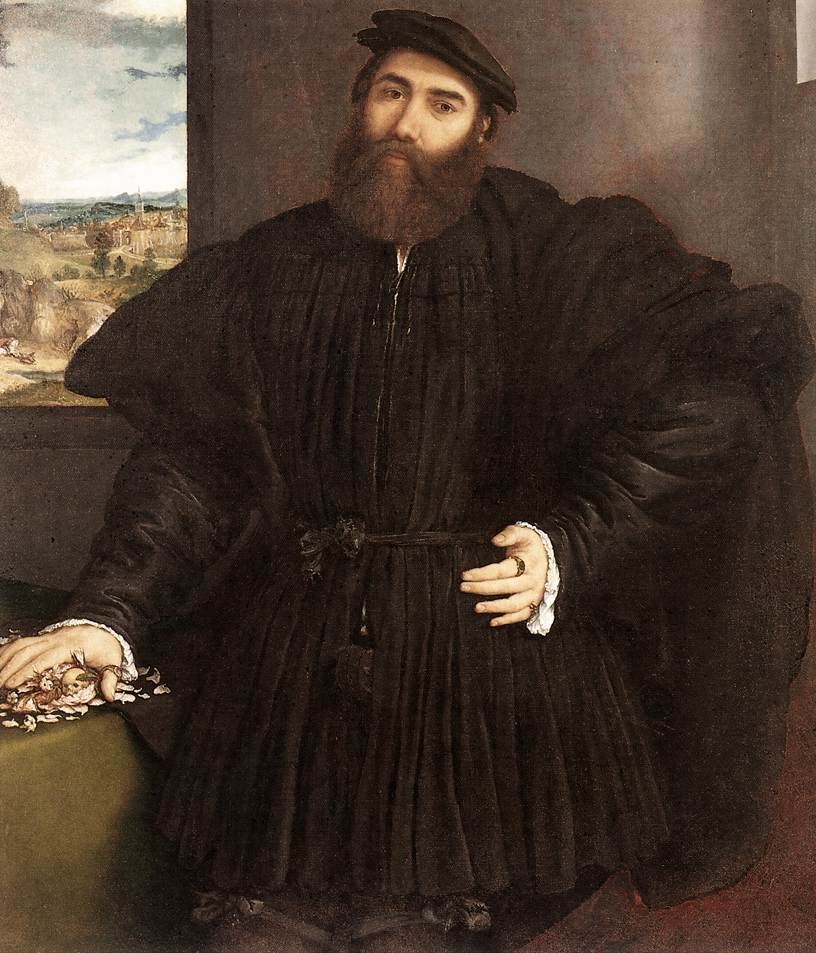
Mercurio Bua

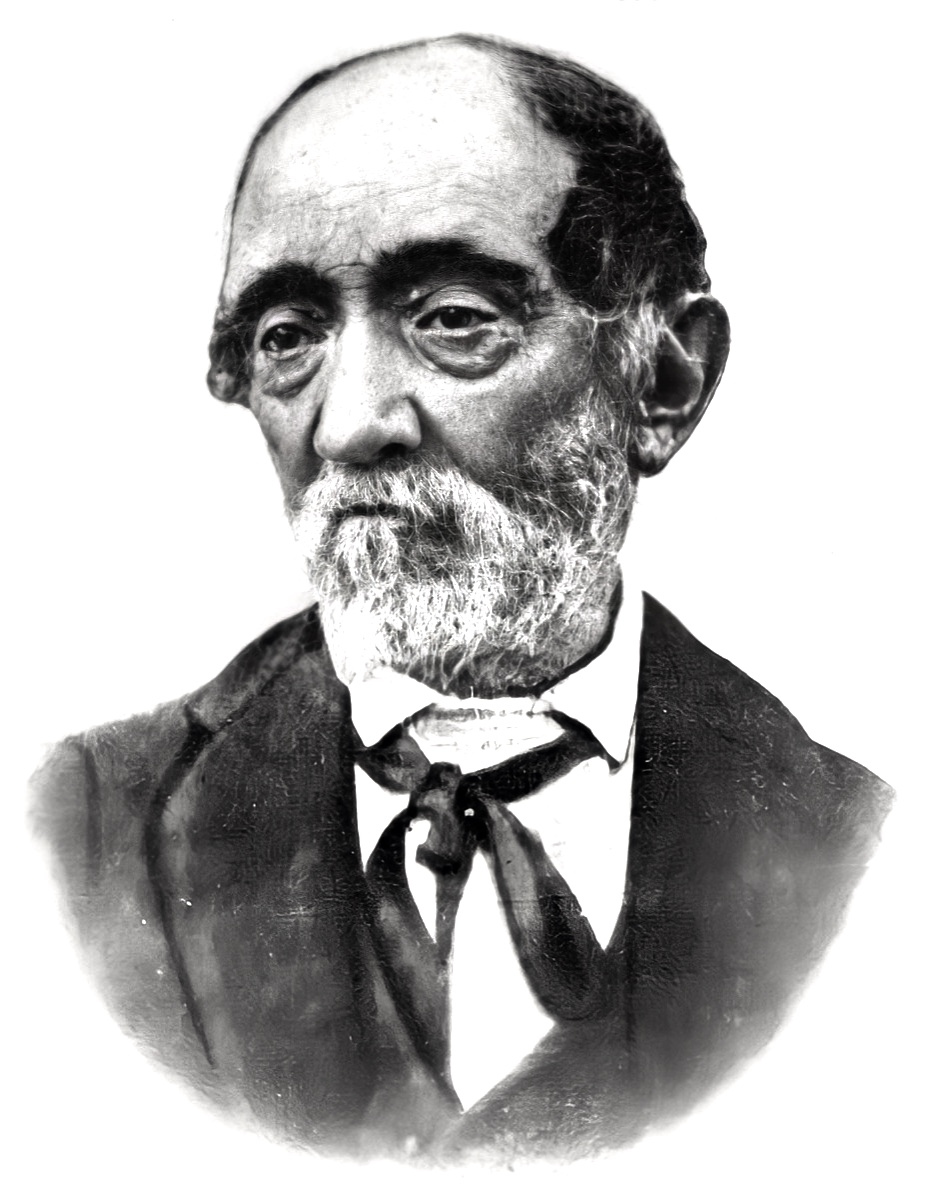
Girolamo de Rada

== See also ==
- Albania–Italy relations
- Immigration to Italy
- Albanian diaspora
- Arbëreshë people and settlements
- Arbëreshë cuisine
