= Karmel Kandreva =

Arbëresh writer and poet

Karmel Kandreva (Italian: Carmelo Candreva; 1931–1982) was an Arbëresh writer and poet.

He was born in Cerzeto (Qanë) in Calabria, Italy. Among his published works is a study Didactic test in a bilingual Arberesh environment, about the right of the Arberesh people to cultivate their own language and to have it taught at schools.

He also published several poetical volumes.

== Bibliography ==
- Didactic test in a bilingual Italo-Albanian environment (1979)
- Spirit of Arbër is alive (1976)
- Spirit of Arbërs is alive: Albanian-Arberesh narrates II (1977)
- Spirit of Arbër is alive: ancient branch suffers III (1979)
