= Casalvecchio =

Casalvecchio is the name of two places in Italy:

- Casalvecchio di Puglia in the province of Foggia (Apulia)
- Casalvecchio Siculo in the province of Messina (Sicily)
