= San Martino di Finita =

- Comune
- Comune di San Martino di Finita
- Coat of arms

- Location within Italy Location within Calabria
- Coordinates: 39°29′N 16°6′E
- Country: Italy
- Region: Calabria
- Province: Cosenza (CS)
- Frazioni: Santa Maria Le Grotte

Government
  - Mayor: Paolo Calabrese

Area
  - Total: 23.9 km^{2} (9.2 sq mi)
- Elevation: 550 m (1,800 ft)

Population (31 July 2018)
  - Total: 1,027
  - Density: 43.0/km^{2} (111/sq mi)
- Demonym: Sammartinesi
- Time zone: UTC+1 (CET)
  - Summer (DST): UTC+2 (CEST)
- Postal code: 87010
- Dialing code: 0984
- Patron saint: St. Martin of Tours
- Saint day: 11 November
- Website: Official website

San Martino di Finita (Arbëreshë Albanian: Shën Mërtiri) is a town and comune in the province of Cosenza in the Calabria region of southern Italy.

It is one of the Arbëreshë settlements of Calabria.
