= Arbëreshë people =

Ethnolinguistic group in Italy

Arbëreshë
Albanians of Italy · Italo-Albanians
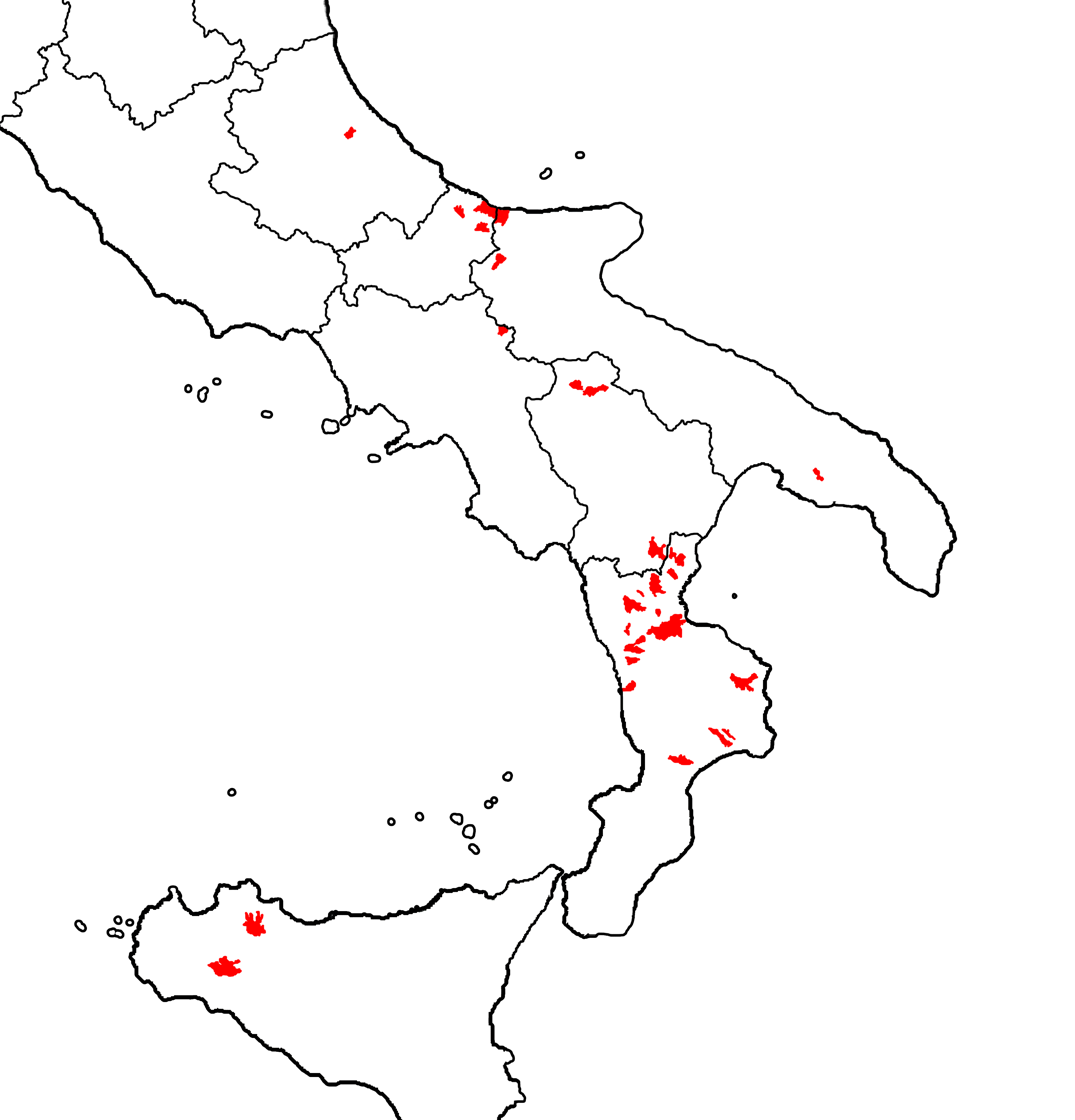
- The Albanian settlements of Italy (numbered list)

Regions with significant populations
- Italy (Abruzzo, Apulia, Basilicata, Calabria, Campania, Molise, Sicily): 100,000–260,000 (Note: Projected ethnic population.)

Languages
- Arbëresh Albanian; Italian

Religion
- Christianity; Eastern Catholicism (Italo-Albanian Church) (minority: Latin Catholicism, Greek Orthodoxy)

Related ethnic groups
- Albanians; Arbanasi; Arvanites

The Arbëreshë (pronounced [aɾbəˈɾɛʃ]; Albanian: Arbëreshët e Italisë; Italian: Albanesi d'Italia), also known as Albanians of Italy or Italo-Albanians, are an Albanian ethnolinguistic group minority historically settled in Southern and Insular Italy (in the regions of Abruzzo, Apulia, Basilicata, Campania, and Molise, but mostly concentrated in the regions of Calabria and Sicily).

They are the descendants of Albanian refugees settled in the Kingdom of Naples and Sicily who fled from Albania, Epirus, and later some from the numerous Albanian communities of Attica and Morea, between the 14th and the 18th centuries following the death of Gjergj Kastrioti Skanderbeg and the gradual conquest of the Balkans by the Ottoman Turks. Their culture is determined by the main features that are found in language, religious rite, traditional costume, art and food, still zealously preserved, with the awareness of belonging to a specific ethnic group.

Over the centuries, the Arbëreshë have managed to maintain and develop their identities, thanks to their cultural value exercised mainly by the religious communities of the Byzantine Rite. Nowadays, most of the fifty Arbëreshë communities are adherents to the Italo-Albanian Church, an Eastern Catholic Church. They belong to two eparchies, the Lungro, for the Arbëreshë of Continental Italy, the Piana degli Albanesi, for the Arbëreshë of Sicily, and the Monastery of Grottaferrata of Lazio, whose Basilian monks come largely from the Albanian settlements of Italy. The church is the most important organization for maintaining the characteristic religious, ethnic, linguistic and traditional identity of the Arbëreshë community.

The Arbëreshë speak Arbërisht, an old variant of the Albanian language which derives from the Tosk Albanian spoken in central-southern Albania and Epirus. In Italy the Albanian Arbëresh language is protected by law number 482/99, concerning the protection of the historic linguistic minorities.

The Arbëreshë are scattered also in other parts of Italy. They are in great numbers in North and South America, especially in the US, Brazil, Chile, Argentina, Mexico, Venezuela, and Uruguay, and in the various parts of central-northern Europe. It is estimated that there are about 100,000 Italo-Albanians (400,000 if including those outside of Italy); they constitute one of the oldest and largest minorities in Italy. When speaking about their "nation", Arbëresh use the term Arbëria, a loose geographical term for the scattered villages in southern Italy which use Arbëresh language.

In the light of historical events, the secular continuity of the Albanian presence in Italy is exceptional. In 2017, an official application for inclusion of the Arbëresh people has been submitted to the UNESCO as a living human and social intangible cultural heritage of humanity by the Government of Albania.

== Distribution ==
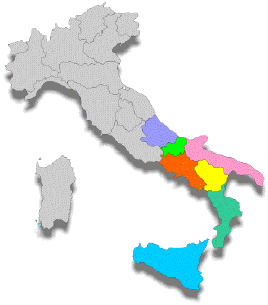
The regions of Italy where there is an Albanian minority

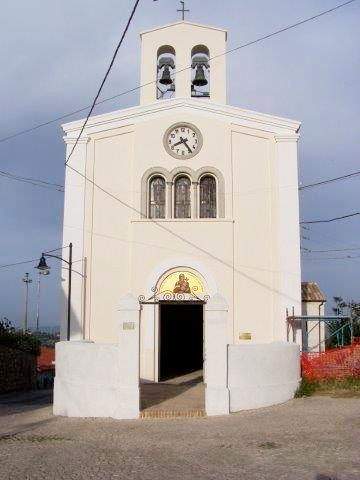
Villa Badessa (Badhesa) in Abruzzo

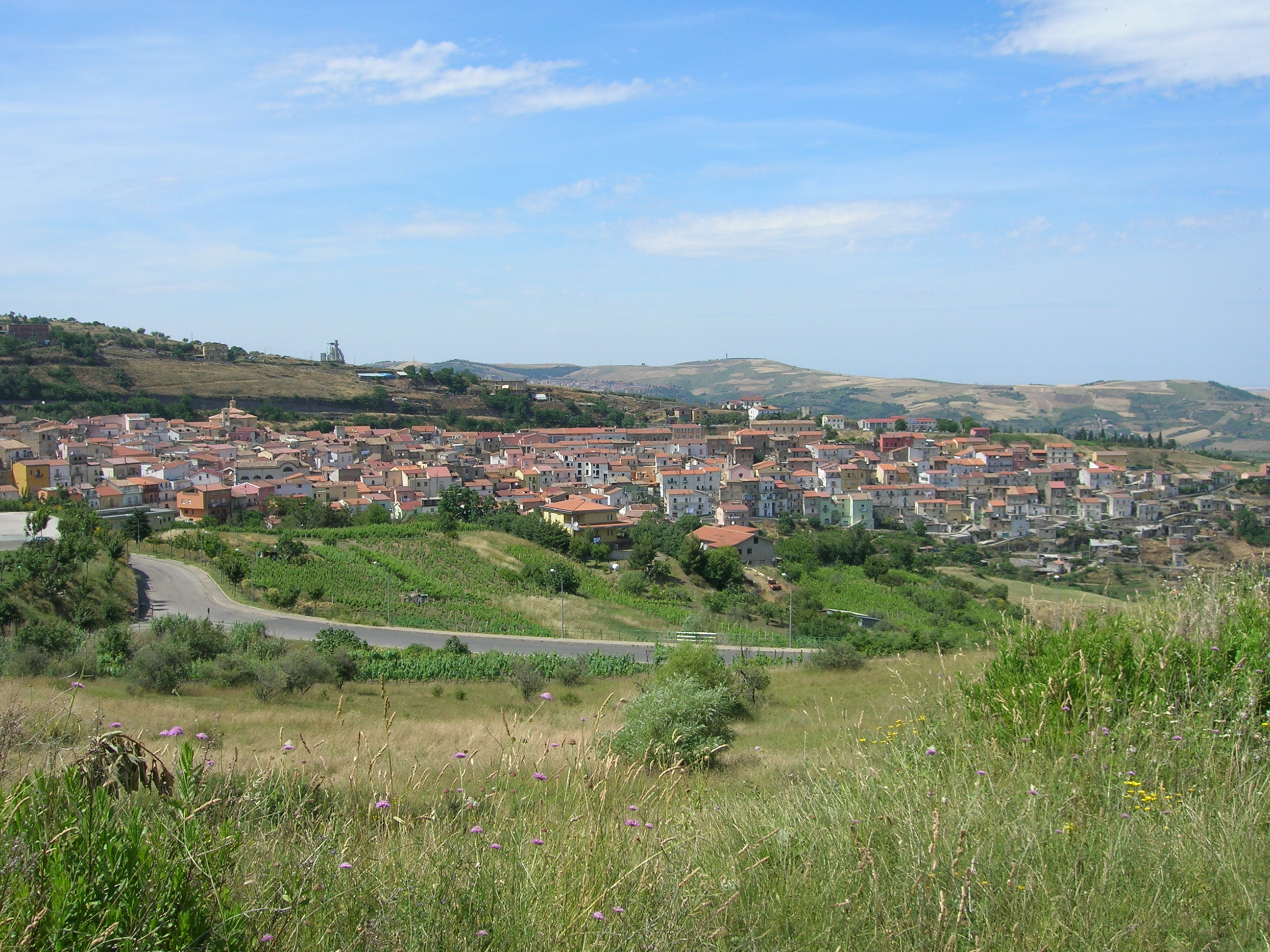
Barile (Barilli) in Basilicata

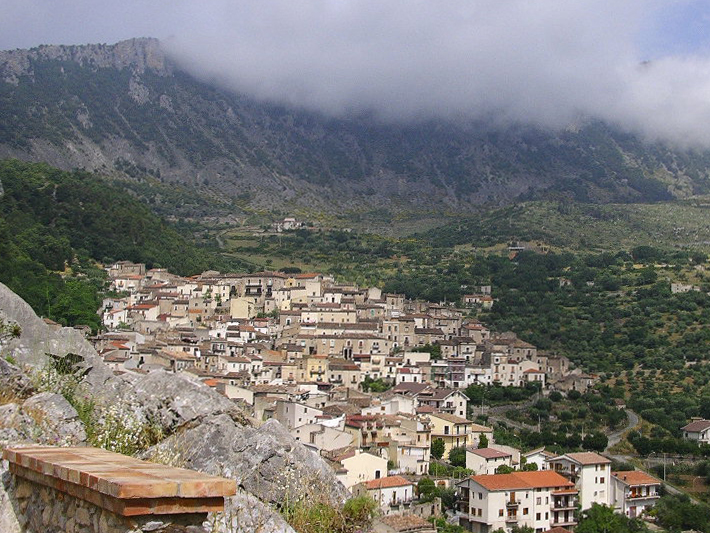
Civita (Çifti) in Calabria

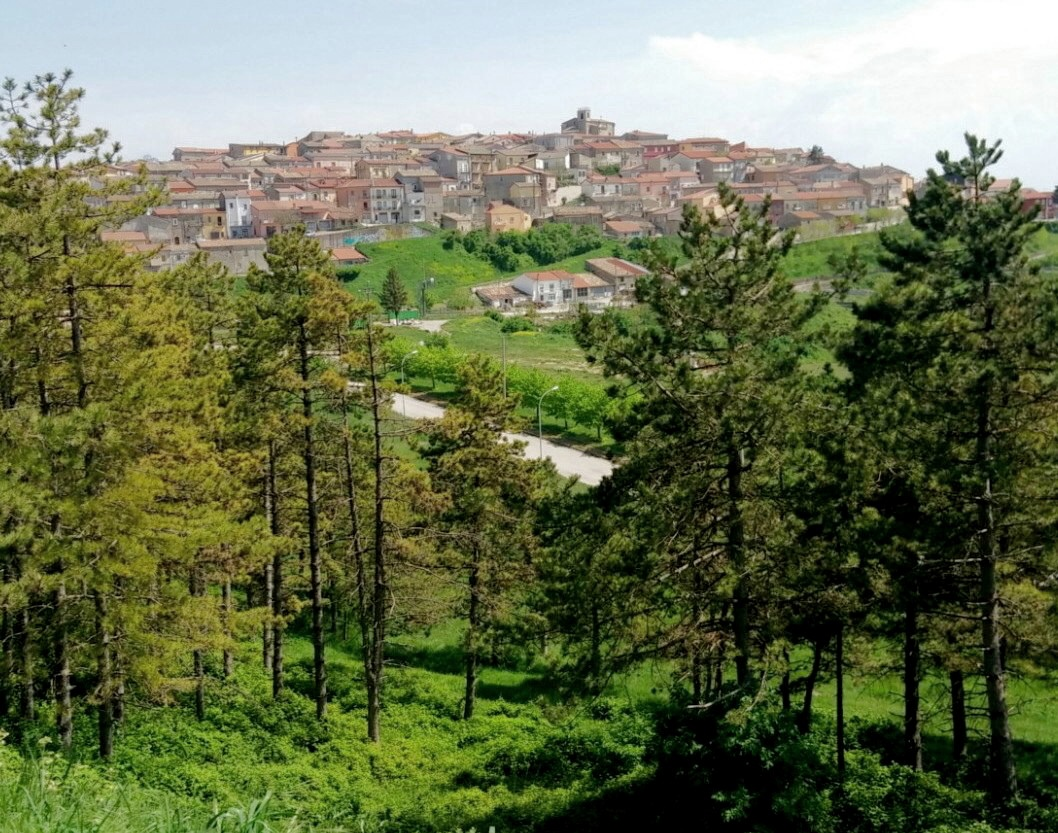
Greci (Katundi) in Campania

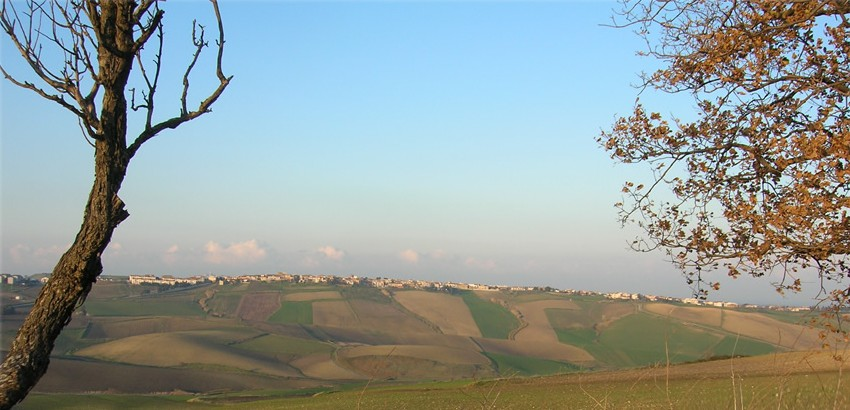
Ururi (Ruri) in Molise

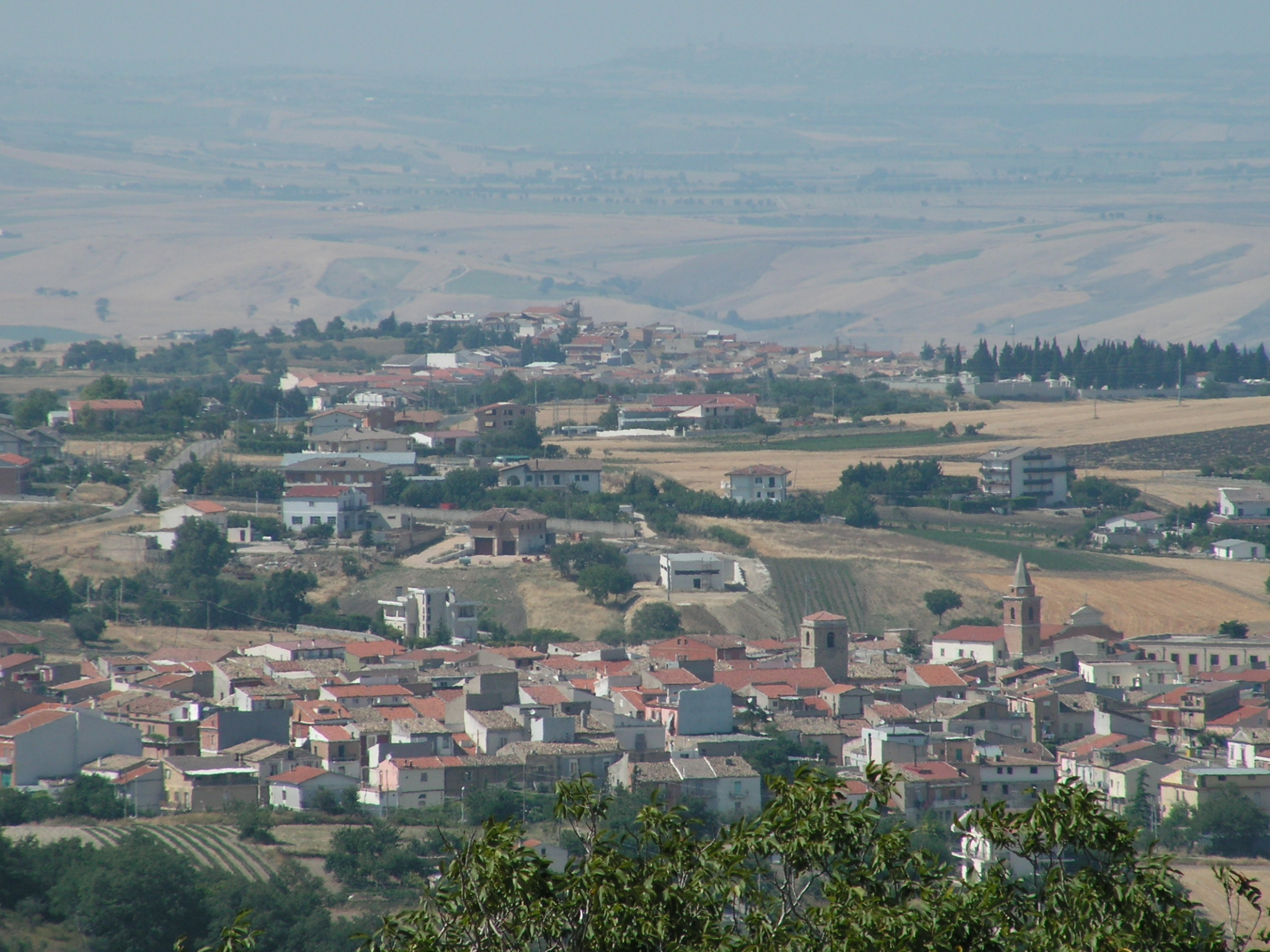
Casalvecchio (or Kazallveqi), in Apulia

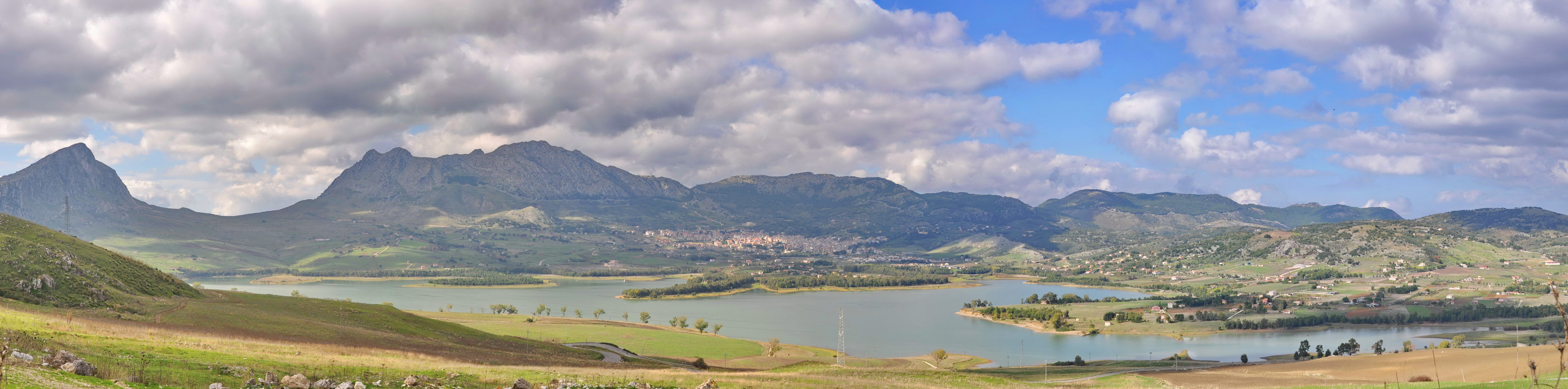
Piana degli Albanesi (Hora e Arbëreshëvet) in Sicily

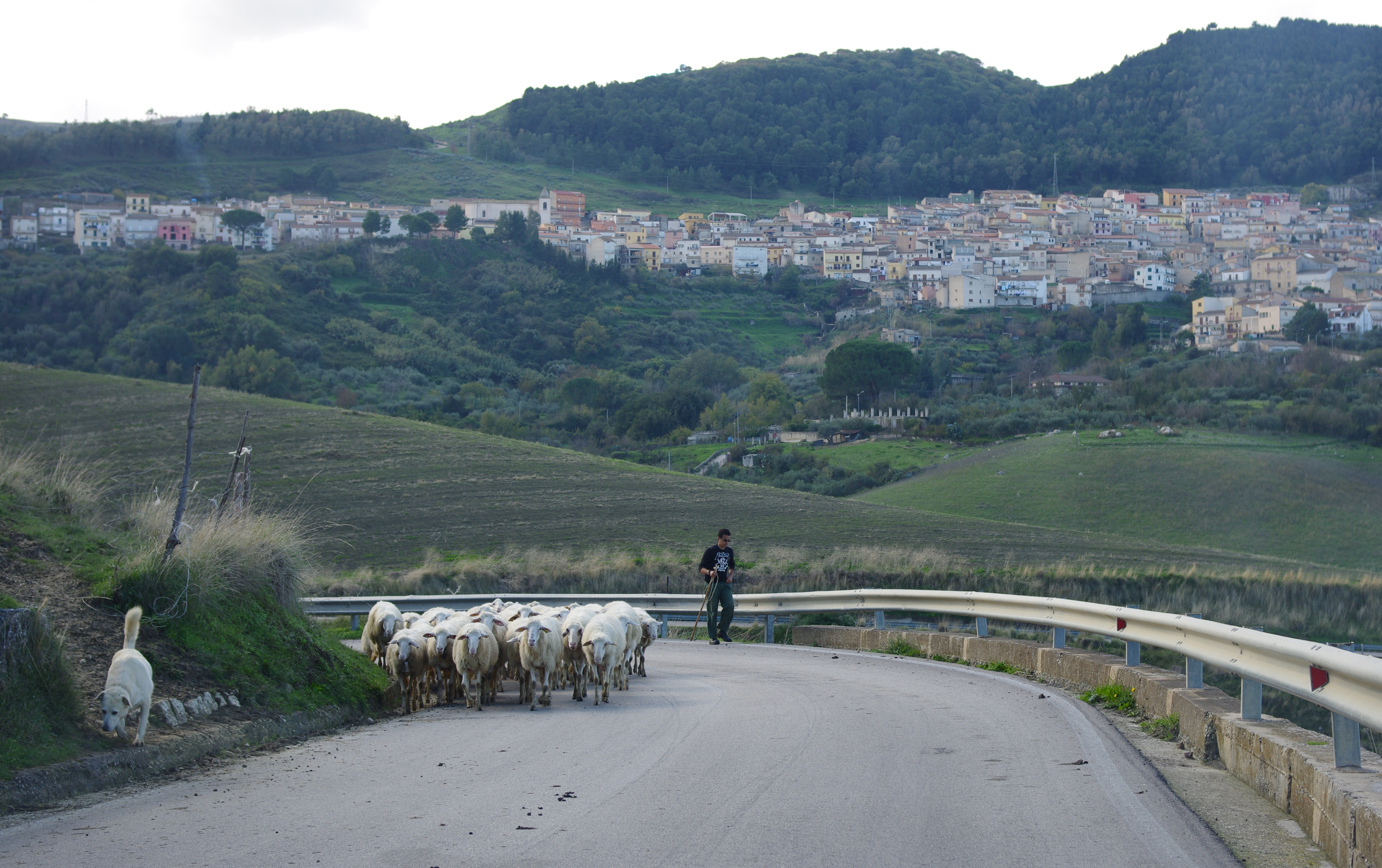
Contessa Entellina (Kuntisa) in Sicily

The Arbëresh villages maintain two or three names, an Italian one as well as one or two native Arbëresh names by which villagers know the place. The Arbëreshë communities are divided into numerous ethnic islands corresponding to different areas of southern Italy. However, some places have already lost their original characteristics and the language, and others have totally disappeared. Today, Italy has 50 communities of Arbëreshë origin and culture, 41 municipalities and 9 villages, spread across seven regions of southern Italy, forming a population of about 100,000. Some cultural islands survive in the metropolitan areas of Milan, Chieri, Turin, Rome, Naples, Bari, Cosenza, Crotone and Palermo. In the rest of the world, following the migrations of the twentieth century to countries such as Canada, Chile, Brazil, Argentina, Uruguay and the United States, there are strong communities that keep Arbëreshë traditions alive.

The full list of the Arbëresh Communities in Italy is:

- Abruzzo
  - Province of Pescara
    - Villa Badessa (frazione of Rosciano): Badhesa
- Molise
  - Province of Campobasso
    - Campomarino: Këmarini
    - Montecilfone: Munxhufuni
    - Portocannone: Portkanuni
    - Ururi: Rùri
- Campania
  - Province of Avellino
    - Greci: Katundi
- Apulia
  - Province of Foggia
    - Casalvecchio di Puglia: Kazallveqi
    - Chieuti: Qefti
  - Provincia di Taranto
    - San Marzano di San Giuseppe: Shën Marcani
- Basilicata
  - Province of Potenza
    - Barile: Barilli
    - Ginestra: Zhura
    - Maschito: Mashqiti
    - Rionero in Vulture: A-Rionero
    - San Costantino Albanese: Shën Kostandini Arbëresh
    - San Paolo Albanese: Shën Pali Arbëresh
- Calabria
  - Province of Catanzaro
    - Andali: Andalli
    - Caraffa di Catanzaro: Garafa
    - Marcedusa: Marçëdhuza
    - Vena di Maida (frazione of Maida): Vina
    - Zagarise: Zagari
  - Province of Cosenza
    - Acquaformosa: Firmoza
    - Cantinella (frazione of Corigliano-Rossano): Kantinela
    - Cerzeto (in the commune of Cerzeto): Qana
    - Castroregio: Kastërnexhi
    - Cavallerizzo (frazione of Cerzeto): Kajverici
    - Civita: Çifti
    - Eianina (frazione of Frascineto): Purçìll
    - Falconara Albanese: Fullkunara
    - Farneta (frazione of Castroregio): Farneta
    - Firmo: Ferma
    - Frascineto: Frasnita
    - Lungro: Ungra
    - Macchia Albanese (frazione of San Demetrio Corone): Maqi
    - Malito
    - Marri (frazione of San Benedetto Ulolano): Allimarri
    - Mongrassano: Mungrasana
    - Plataci: Pllatëni
    - San Basile: Shën Vasili
    - San Benedetto Ullano: Shën Benedhiti
    - Santa Caterina Albanese: Picilia
    - San Cosmo Albanese: Strihàri
    - San Demetrio Corone: Shën Mitri
    - San Giorgio Albanese: Mbuzati
    - San Giacomo di Cerzeto (frazione of Cerzeto): Shën Japku
    - San Martino di Finita: Shën Mërtiri
    - Santa Sofia d'Epiro: Shën Sofia
    - Spezzano Albanese: Spixana
    - Vaccarizzo Albanese: Vakarici
  - Province of Crotone
    - Carfizzi: Karfici
    - Pallagorio: Puhëriu
    - San Nicola dell'Alto Shën Kolli
- Sicily
  - Province of Catania
    - Biancavilla: Callìcari
  - Province of Palermo
    - Contessa Entellina: Kuntisa
    - Piana degli Albanesi: Hora e Arbëreshëvet
    - Santa Cristina Gela: Sëndahstina

=== Community of Albanian origin ===
More than thirty ancient Albanian centers have lost, in different historical periods and for various reasons, the use of the Albanian language and are thus characterized by a lack of historical and cultural heritage of the Arbëresh: for Emilia-Romagna they are Pievetta and Bosco Tosca, hamlets of Castel San Giovanni (PC); for Lazio it is Pianiano (VT), a hamlet of Cellere; for Molise it is Santa Croce di Magliano (CB); for Campania in the province of Caserta it is Alife; for Apulia they are Casalnuovo Monterotaro, Castelluccio dei Sauri, San Paolo di Civitate (FG), Monteparano, San Giorgio Ionico, San Crispieri, Faggiano, Roccaforzata, Monteiasi, Carosino, Montemesola (TA); for Basilicata they are Brindisi Montagna, Rionero in Vulture (PZ); for Calabria are Cervicati (Çervikat), Mongrassano (Mungrasana), Rota Greca (Rrota), San Lorenzo del Vallo (Sullarënxa '), Sartano, Serra d'Aiello (Serrë, CS), Amato, Arietta (Arjèta), fraction of Petronà, Gizzeria (Jacaria) and the hamlets Mortilla (Mortilë) and Gizzeria Lido (Zalli i Jacarisë), Zagarise, Zangarona (Xingarona), fraction of Lamezia Terme, (CZ); for Sicily they are Mezzojuso (Munxifsi), Palazzo Adriano (Pallaci, PA), Sant'Angelo Muxaro (Shënt'Ëngjëlli, AG), Biancavilla (Callìcari), Bronte (Brontë), San Michele di Ganzaria(Shën Mikelli, CT).

The communities of Mezzojuso and Palazzo Adriano, in the province of Palermo, are to be considered a particular case, since, despite having lost the Albanian language and the customs of origin, they have kept the Greek-Byzantine rite, a peculiar pillar (together with language and customs) of the Albanian identity of the diaspora. In this case the identity is preserved in the religious aspect and in the historical memory. The communities of Cervicati, Mongrassano and Rota Greca, in the province of Cosenza, preserve the memory of the original cultural heritage.

The Albanian migrations, since the beginning of the long diaspora, led to the formation of medium-small Arbëreshe communities well integrated in numerous existing cities of central-northern Italy (in particular, Venice) and in the Crown of Aragon (Naples, Bari, Altamura, Barletta, Andria, Trani, Foggia, Bovino, San Severo, Lecce, Brindisi, Potenza, Matera, Melfi, Caltagirone and Piazza Armerina), in most cases reality – again for different reasons – assimilated by the surrounding culture.

=== Cultural islands, migrations and the modern Albanian diaspora ===
Relevant cultural islands survive in the large metropolitan areas of Milan, Turin, Rome, Naples, Bari, Cosenza, Crotone and Palermo. In the rest of the world, following the migrations of the twentieth century in countries such as Canada, the United States, Argentina, Brazil, Chile and Uruguay there are strong communities that keep the Arbëreshë language and traditions alive.

Since 1990, with the fall of the post-Bolshevik communist regime in Albania, significant communities of shqiptarë (Albanians of Albania) have entered and integrated into the social fabric of the Italian-Albanian towns. With the struggle for the independence of Kosovo (2008) a very recent group of Albanians, victims of the ethnic cleansing of the Yugoslav regime, has also integrated itself into the various Albanian communities of Italy.

== History ==
=== Ethnonym ===
In the Middle Ages, the native Albanians in the area of Albania called their country Arbëri or Arbëni and referred to themselves as Arbëreshë or Arbëneshë. In the sixteenth century, the toponym Shqipëria and the demonym Shqiptarë gradually replaced Arbëria and Arbëresh respectively. Nowadays, only the Albanians in Italy, whose ancestors immigrated from the Middle Ages, are called Arbëresh and the language Arbërisht. The term Arbëreshë and its variants are also used as endonyms by the Arbanasi in Croatia, Arvanites in Greece, and Arnavut in Turkey.

=== Early modern migrations ===
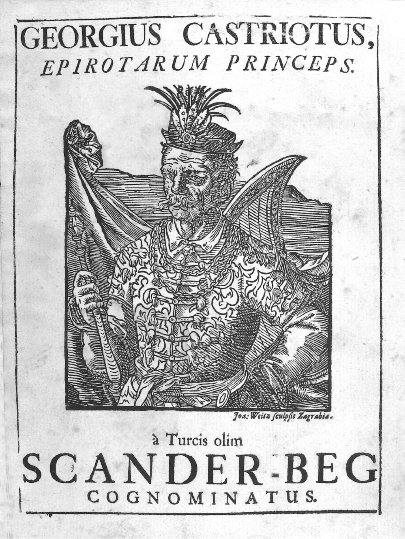
Skanderbeg led 2,500 Albanian soldiers into the Kingdom of Naples in 1461

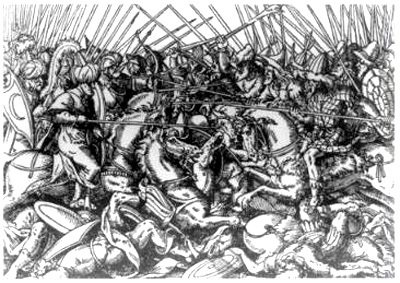
The Battle of Torvioll in 1444 was the first confrontation between Skanderbeg's Albanians and the Ottoman Turks

The invasion of the Balkans by the Ottoman Turks in the 15th century forced many Arbëreshë to emigrate from Albania and Epirus, Attica, Thebes, Peloponnese then called Morea and other Islands to southern Italy. There were several waves of migrations. In 1448, the King of Naples Alfonso V of Aragon appealed to Skanderbeg to help suppress a revolt at Naples. Skanderbeg sent a force under the leadership of Demetrio Reres, and his two sons. Following a request by the Albanian soldiers, King Alfonso granted them land and they were settled in twelve villages in the mountainous area called Catanzaro in 1448. A year later the sons of Demetrio, George and Basil along with other Albanians were settled in four villages in Sicily.

In 1461, the son of Alfonso, king Ferdinand I of Naples again requested the help of Skanderbeg. This time, the legendary leader himself came to Italy with his troops led by one of his generals (according to Barletti, Goico Stresa Balsha), to end a French-supported insurrection. Skanderbeg was appointed as the leader of the combined Neapolitan-Albanian army and, after winning two decisive battles, the Albanian soldiers effectively defended Naples. This time they were rewarded with land east of Taranto in Apulia, populating 15 other villages.

After the death of Skanderbeg in 1468, the organized Albanian resistance against the Ottomans came to an end. Like much of the Balkans, Albania became subject to the invading Turks. Many of its people under the rule of Luca Baffa and Marco Becci fled to the neighboring countries and settled in a few villages in Calabria. From the time of Skanderbeg's death until 1480 there were constant migrations of Albanians to the Italian coast. Throughout the 16th century, these migrations continued and other Albanian villages were formed on Italian soil. The new immigrants often took up work as mercenaries hired by Italian armies.

According to some albanologists, this historiographic tradition was created ad hoc, as they believe that the resistance of Skanderbeg against the Turks was not the major factor that produced the Albanian migration to Italy. Indeed, scholars argue that Albanians have migrated from the western Balkans to Italy through several waves since the Middle Ages, even before Skanderbeg's period.

Another wave of emigration, between 1500 and 1534, relates to Arbëreshë from central Greece. Employed as mercenaries by Venice, they had to evacuate the colonies of the Peloponnese with the assistance of the troops of Charles V, as the Turks had invaded that region. Charles V established these troops in southern Italy to reinforce defenses against the threat of Turkish invasion. Established in isolated villages (which enabled them to maintain their culture until the 20th century), Arbëreshë were, traditionally, soldiers for the Kingdom of Naples and the Republic of Venice, from the Wars of Religion to the Napoleonic invasion.

=== Later migrations ===
The wave of migration from southern Italy to the Americas in 1900–1910 and 1920–1940 depopulated approximately half of the Arbëreshë villages, and subjected the population to the risk of cultural disappearance, despite the beginning of a cultural and artistic revival in the 19th century.

Since the end of communism in Albania in 1990, there has been a wave of immigration into Arbëreshë villages by Albanians.

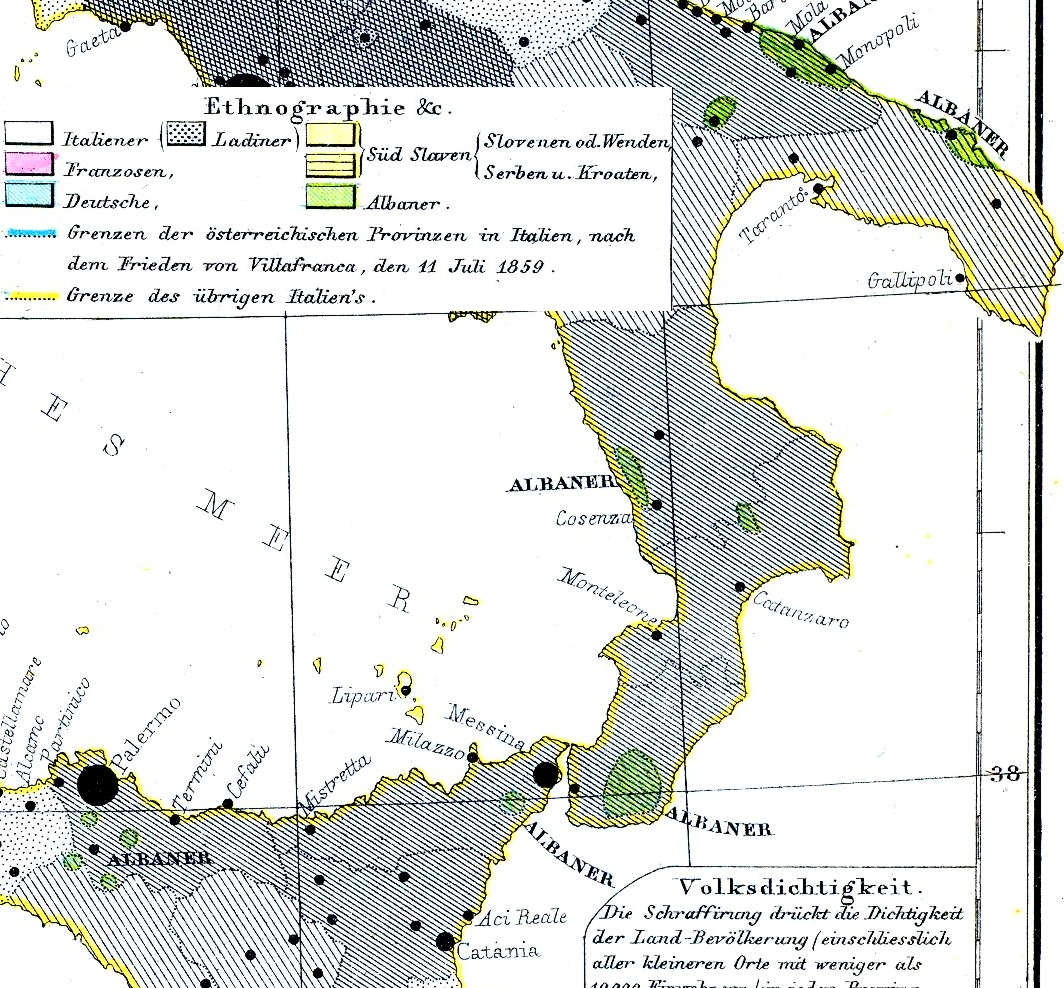
Ethnographic map: 1859 depicting the Albanian population in green

Albanian ethno-linguistic territories

== Language ==
Arbërisht language classification

Arbëresh derives from the Tosk dialect spoken in southern Albania, and is spoken in Southern Italy in the regions of Calabria, Molise, Apulia, Basilicata, Campania, Abruzzi, and Sicily. All dialects of Arbëresh are closely related to each other.

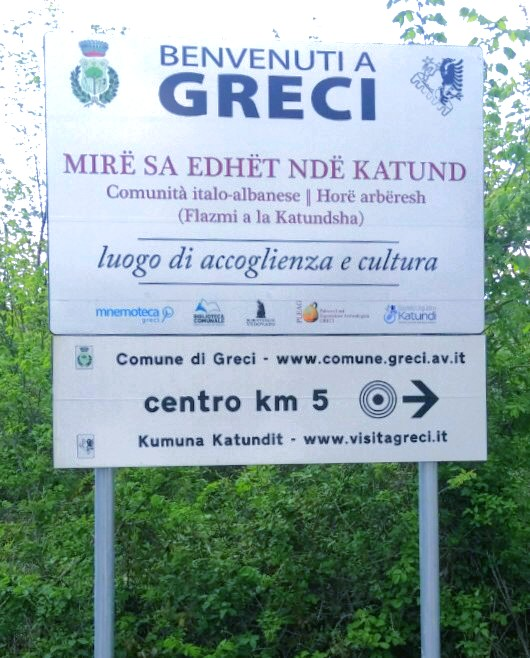
A multingual billboard near Greci, Campania

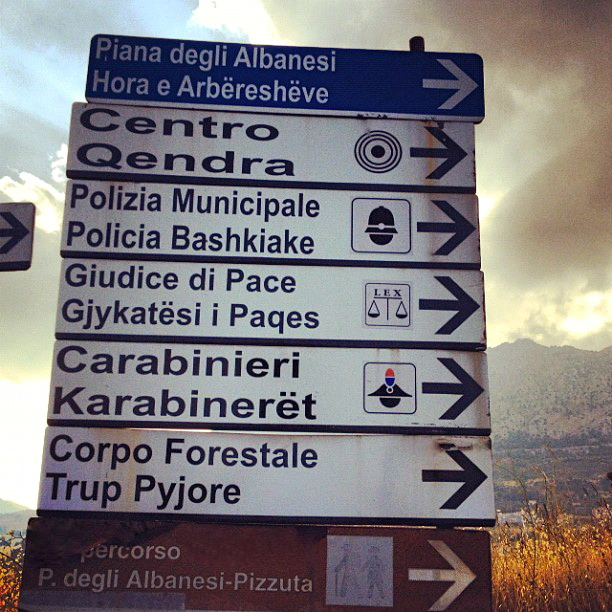
Bilingual road signs (in Italian and Albanian) in Piana degli Albanesi, Sicily

The Arbëresh language retains many archaisms of medieval Albanian from pre-Ottoman Albania in the 15th century. It also retains some Greek language elements, including vocabulary and pronunciation. It has also preserved some conservative features that were lost in mainstream Albanian Tosk. For example, it has preserved certain syllable-initial consonant clusters which have been simplified in Standard Albanian (cf. Arbërisht gluhë /ˈɡluxə/ ('language/tongue'), vs. Standard Albanian gjuhë /ˈɟuhə/). It sounds more archaic than Standard Albanian, but is close enough that it is written using the same Albanian alphabet as Standard Albanian. A Shqiptar (Albanian) listening to or reading Arbërisht is similar to a modern English speaker listening to or reading Shakespearean English. The Arbëresh language is of particular interest to students of the modern Albanian language as it represents the sounds, grammar, and vocabulary of pre-Ottoman Albania.

Arbërisht was commonly called Albanese ("Albanian" in Italian) in Italy until the 1990s. Until recently, Arbërisht speakers had only very imprecise notions about how related or unrelated their language was to Albanian. Until the 1980s Arbërisht was exclusively a spoken language, except for its written form used in the Italo-Albanian Church, and Arbëreshë people had no practical affiliation with the Standard Albanian language used in Albania, as they did not use this form in writing or in media. When a large number of immigrants from Albania began to enter Italy in the 1990s, they came into contact with local Arbëreshë communities.

Since the 1980s, some efforts have been organized to preserve the cultural and linguistic heritage of the language. Arbërisht has been under a slow decline in recent decades, but is currently experiencing a revival in many villages in Italy. Figures such as Giuseppe Schirò Di Maggio have done much work on school books and other language learning tools in the language, producing two books Udha e Mbarë and Udhëtimi, both used in schools in the village of Piana degli Albanesi.

Linguists focusing on the language include (Albanian) Eda Derhemi, (diaspora born) Martin Di Maggio as well as (Piana degli Albanesi native) Vito Matranga.

There is no official political, administrative or cultural structure which represents the Arbëresh community. Arbërësh is not one of the group of minority languages that enjoy the special protection of the State under Article 6 of the Italian Constitution. At the regional level, however, Arbërisht is accorded some degree of official recognition in the autonomy statutes of Calabria, Basilicata and Molise.

- In the case of Calabria, the region is to provide for recognition of the historical culture and artistic heritage of the populations of Arbëresh origin and to promote the teaching of the two languages in the places where they are spoken.
- Article 5 of the autonomy statute of Basilicata lays down that the regional authorities "shall promote renewed appreciation of the originality of the linguistic and cultural heritage of the local communities".
- Finally, the autonomy statute of the Molise region stipulates that the region "shall be the guardian of the linguistic and historical heritage and of the popular traditions of the ethnic communities existing in its territory and, by agreement with the interested municipalities, shall promote renewed appreciation of them".

In certain communes the local authorities support cultural and linguistic activities promoted by the Arbëresh communities and have agreed to the erection of bilingual road signs. There are associations that try to protect the culture, particularly in the province of Cosenza. The Arbëresh language is used in some private radios and publications. The fundamental laws of the areas of Molise, Basilicata and Calabria make reference to the Arbëresh language and culture. Nevertheless, the increase in training in the use of the written language has given some hope for the continuity of this culture.

=== Literature ===
==== Early Arbëreshë literature ====
The first work of Italo-Albanian literature was that of Sicilian archpriest Luca Matranga (1567–1619). The book was titled E mbsuama e krështerë (Christian Doctrine) and it was a simple religious translation in Arbëresh language, aiming at bringing Christianity closer to his people is Southern Italy. While during the 17th century there were no Arbëresh writers, in the 18th century there was Giulio Variboba (1724–1788, Jul Variboba), regarded by many Albanians as the first genuine poet in all of Albanian literature. Variboba is considered unique in Albanian literature for his poetic sensitivities and the variety of rhythmic expression. Another known artistic figure of that time was Nicola Chetta (1740–1803) known in Albanian as Nikollë Keta. As a poet he wrote verses both in Albanian and Greek language and he has also composed the first Albanian sonnet in 1777. Being a poet, lexicographer, linguist, historian, theologian and rector of Greek seminary, his variety and universality of work distinguish him from other writers of the period. The most prominent figure among Arbëresh writers and the foremost figure of the Albanian nationalist movement in 19th-century Italy was that of Girolamo de Rada (Jeronim De Rada).

== Religion ==
=== The Italo-Albanian Church ===
The Italo-Albanian Catholic Church, particular church sui iuris, includes three ecclesiastical jurisdictions: the Eparchy of Lungro degli Italo-Albanesi for the Albanians of Southern Italy based in Lungro (CS); the Eparchy of Piana degli Albanesi for Albanians of Insular Italy based in Piana degli Albanesi (PA); the Territorial Abbacy of Santa Maria of Grottaferrata, with Basilian monks (O.S.B.I.) come from the Italo-Albanian communities, located in the only abbey and abbey church in Grottaferrata (RM).

The Italo-Albanian Catholic Church being a Byzantine enclave in the Latin West, is secularly inclined to ecumenism between the Catholic Church and the Eastern Orthodox Church. It was the only abode of eastern Christianity from the end of the Middle Ages until the twentieth century in Italy.

There are institutions and religious congregations of the Byzantine rite in the territory of the Italo-Albanian Church: the Basilian Order of Grottaferrata, the Collegine Sisters of Sacra Famiglia, Piccole operaie dei Sacri Cuori and the congregation of the Basilian Sisters Daughters of Saint Macrina.

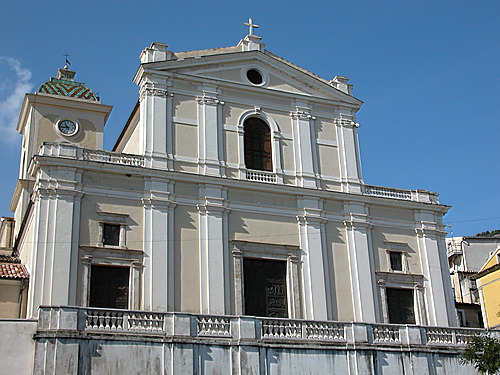
The Cathedral of Lungro of the Italo-Albanians of Southern Italy

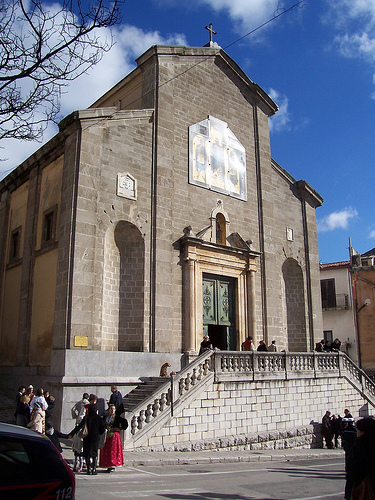
The Cathedral of Piana degli Albanesi of the Italo-Albanians of Sicily, Italy

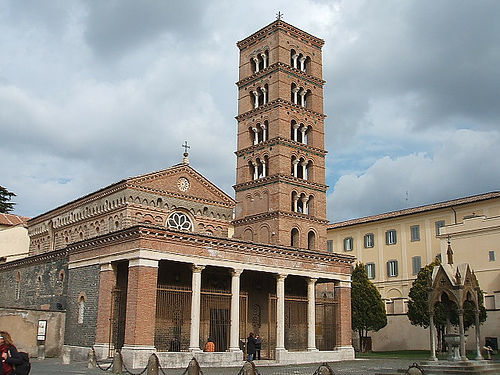
The Territorial Abbacy of Santa Maria of Grottaferrata with Basilian monks from the Italo-Albanian communities

== Culture ==
=== Traditions and folklore ===
Among the Arbëreshë the memory of Skanderbeg and his exploits was maintained and survived through songs, in the form of a Skanderbeg cycle.

Arbëreshë people have preserved their Albanian traditional dances (vallje), including the Albanian sword dance.

=== Gjitonía ===
"Gjitonia" is a form of neighbourhood typical of Arbëresh communities and widespread throughout the Arbëresh people. It comes from the Greek γειτονιά (geitonía). The Gjitonía functions as a microsystem around which the life of the horë (village) revolves; the Gjitonía is a smaller-scale version of the layout of the village often consisting of a small square towards which the alleys are oriented, surrounded by buildings that have openings towards a larger square (shesh) on diagonal angles. The name is usually taken from the families that live there. The social aspect of the Gjitonía is an ancient and historical structure where values of hospitality and solidarity between the families of the neighbourhood coexisted and where there was no difference of social class. Mainly for the Italian-Albanian communities, it is a world where relationships were so strong that they created real family relationships so much so that the Arbëreshe phrase Gjitoni gjirì ("neighbourhood relatives") is typical.

=== Cuisine ===
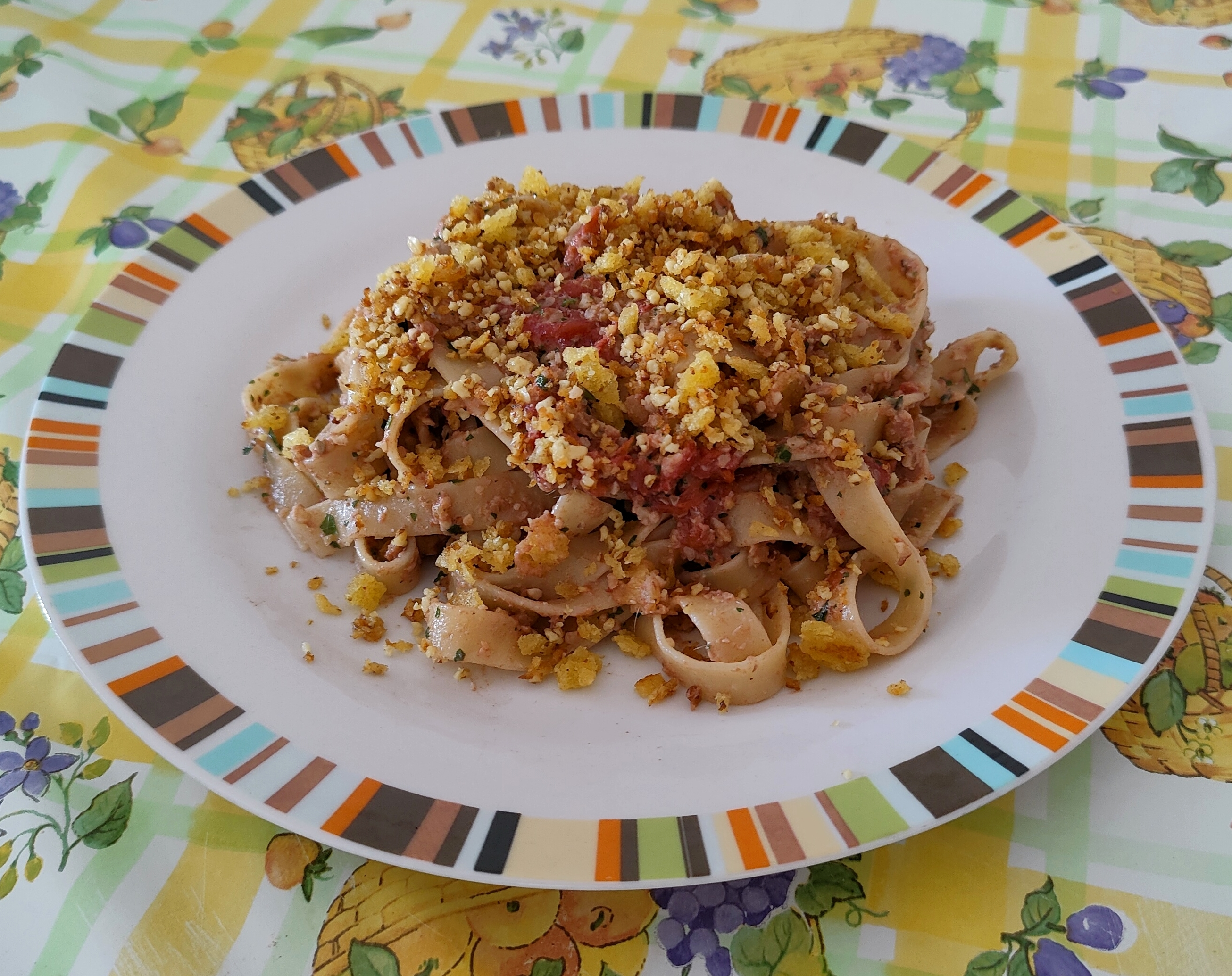
Tumacë me tulë, Arbëreshë dish from Barile (Potenza, Basilicata)

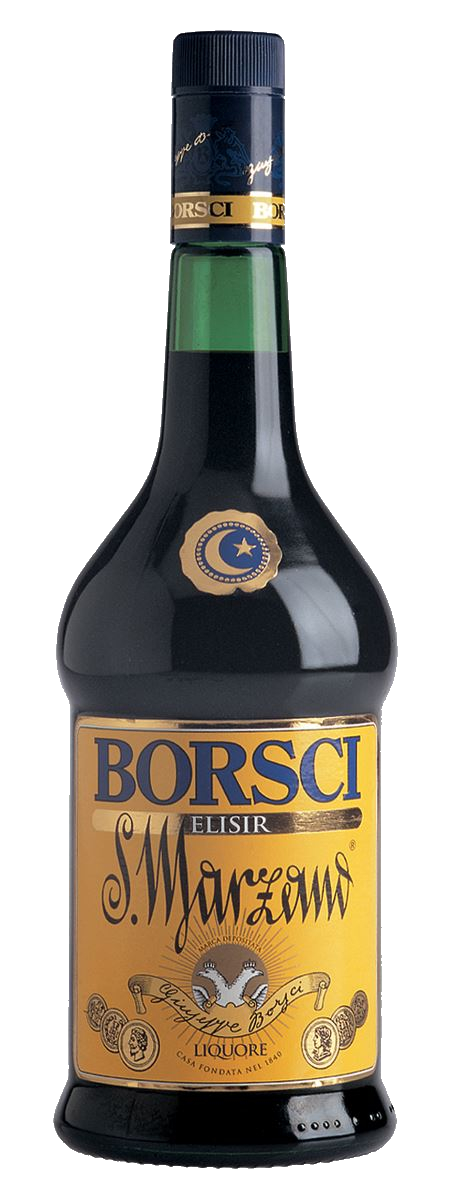
The liquor "Elisir Borsci" from San Marzano di San Giuseppe, (Taranto, Apulia)

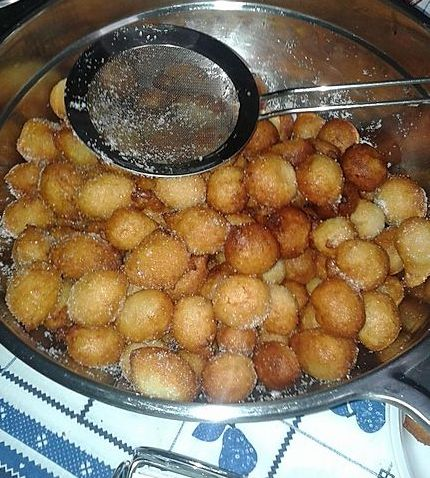
Petullat, typical Italo-Albanian sweets, of fried and sweetened yeast dough

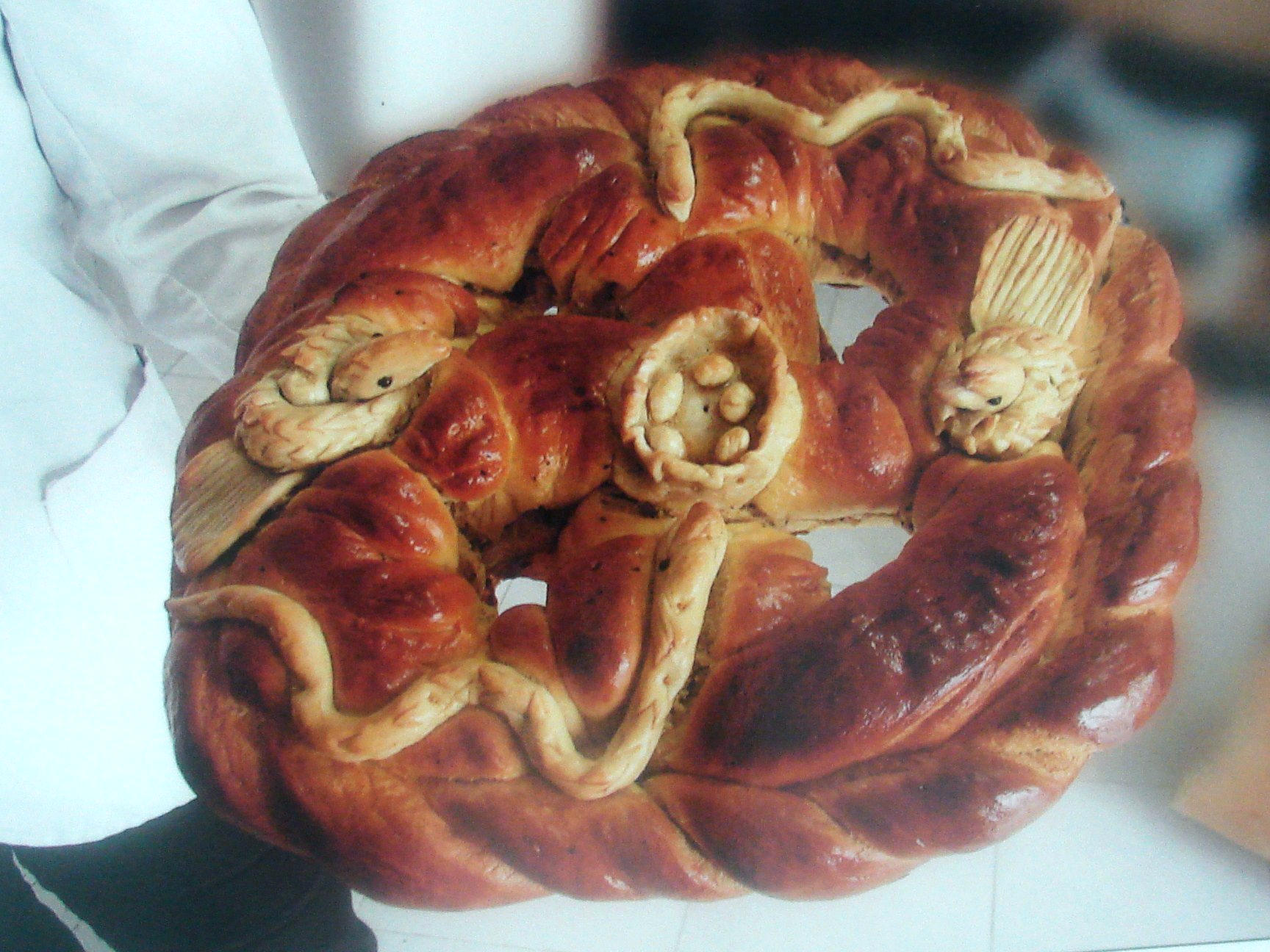
The wedding cake Kulaçi from San Costantino Albanese, (Potenza, Basilicata)

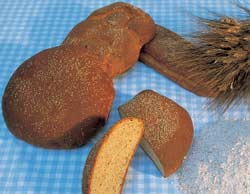
The famous bread ( buka ) typical of Piana degli Albanesi (Palermo, Sicily)

The Arbëreshë cuisine is composed of the cuisines of Albania and Italy. The style of cooking and the food associated with it have evolved over many centuries from their Albanian origins to a mixed cuisine of Sicilian, Calabrian, and Lucanian influences.

These traditional dishes are Piana degli Albanesi (Palermo, Sicily):

- Strangujët – A form of Gnocchi called Strangujtë made with flour by hand, flavoured with tomato sauce (lënk) and basil. Traditionally this dish was consumed by families seated around a floor level table of wood (zbrilla) on 14 September, the Festa e Kryqit Shejt (Exaltation of the Cross).
- Grurët – Boiled wheat dish flavored with olive oil, known as cuccìa in the Sicilian language. The tradition is to eat it on Festa e Sënda Lluçisë. Variations are the use of sweetened milk or ricotta with flakes of chocolate, orange peel and almonds.
- Kanojët – Cannoli, the universally famous Pianotto sweet pastry. Its culinary secret is waffle (shkorça) of flour, wine, lard and salt and filled with sweetened ricotta, and lastly sprinkled with sieved chocolate.
- Bukë – Arbëresh bread (bukë) is prepared with local hard grain flour and manufactured to a round and mostly leavened shape with natural methods. It is cooked in antique firewood furnaces (Tandoor). It is eaten warm flavored with olive oil (vaj i ullirit) and dusted with cheese or with fresh ricotta.
- Panaret – Arbëresh Easter bread shaped either into a circle or into two large braids and sprinkled with sesame seeds. It is adorned with red Easter eggs. The Easter eggs are dyed deep red to represent the blood of Christ, the eggs also represent new life and springtime. It is traditionally eaten during the Resurrection Meal. After 40 days of fasting, as per the Byzantine Catholic tradition, the Easter feast has to begin slowly, with a light meal after the midnight liturgy on Saturday night. The fast is generally broken with panaret.
- Loshkat and Petullat – Sweetened spherical or crushed shaped fried leavened dough. Eaten on the eve of E Mart e Madh Carnival.
- Të plotit – A sweet cake in various shaped with fig marmalade filling, one of the oldest Arbëresh dishes.
- Milanisë – Traditionally eaten on the Saint Joseph's Day (Festa e Shën Zefit) and Good Friday, is a pasta dish made with a sauce (lënk) of wild fennel paste, sardines and pine nuts.
- Udhose and Gjizë – Homemade cheese and ricotta normally dried outdoors.
- Likëngë – Pork sausages flavored with salt, pepper and seed of Fennel (farë mbrai).
- Llapsana – Forest Brussels sprout (llapsana) fried with garlic and oil.
- Dorëzët – Very thin home-made semolina spaghetti, cooked in milk and eaten on Ascension Day.
- Groshët – Soup made of fava beans, chickpeas and haricot beans.
- Verdhët – During Easter a kind of pie is prepared with eggs, lamb, ricotta, sheep cheese and (previously boiled) leaf stalks of golden thistle; in some villages, the young aerial parts of wild fennel are used instead.

== Physical appearance ==
A study from 1918 included 59 Arbëreshë men from Cosenza, Calabria, the result showed that fair hair was present in 27% of them. The same study also showed that the frequencies of light eyes and white skin, were 47% and 67% respectively. The Arbëreshë, from this survey, are found to be overall less pigmented than the Calabrians. They are also taller (m. 1.64) and less dolichocephalic (cephalic index 80.6).

== Genetics ==
Multiple studies based on paternal lineages revealed the Arbereshë to be clearly an outlier population in the Italian genetic background, with a strong genetic affinity with southern Balkans populations and with only a minimal admixture from nearby Greek and Italian populations. The haplogroups most strongly associated with Arbereshë people are R1a-Z282, I-M423, R1b-M269, I-M26, E-V13, I-M223 and E-M123, all found in the Balkans since the Bronze Age and Medieval Age.

A full genome study found that the Arbereshë appears as slightly differentiated from Southern Italians, by clustering with the other Southern Balkan populations such as Albanians of Albania and Kosovo.

== Gallery ==
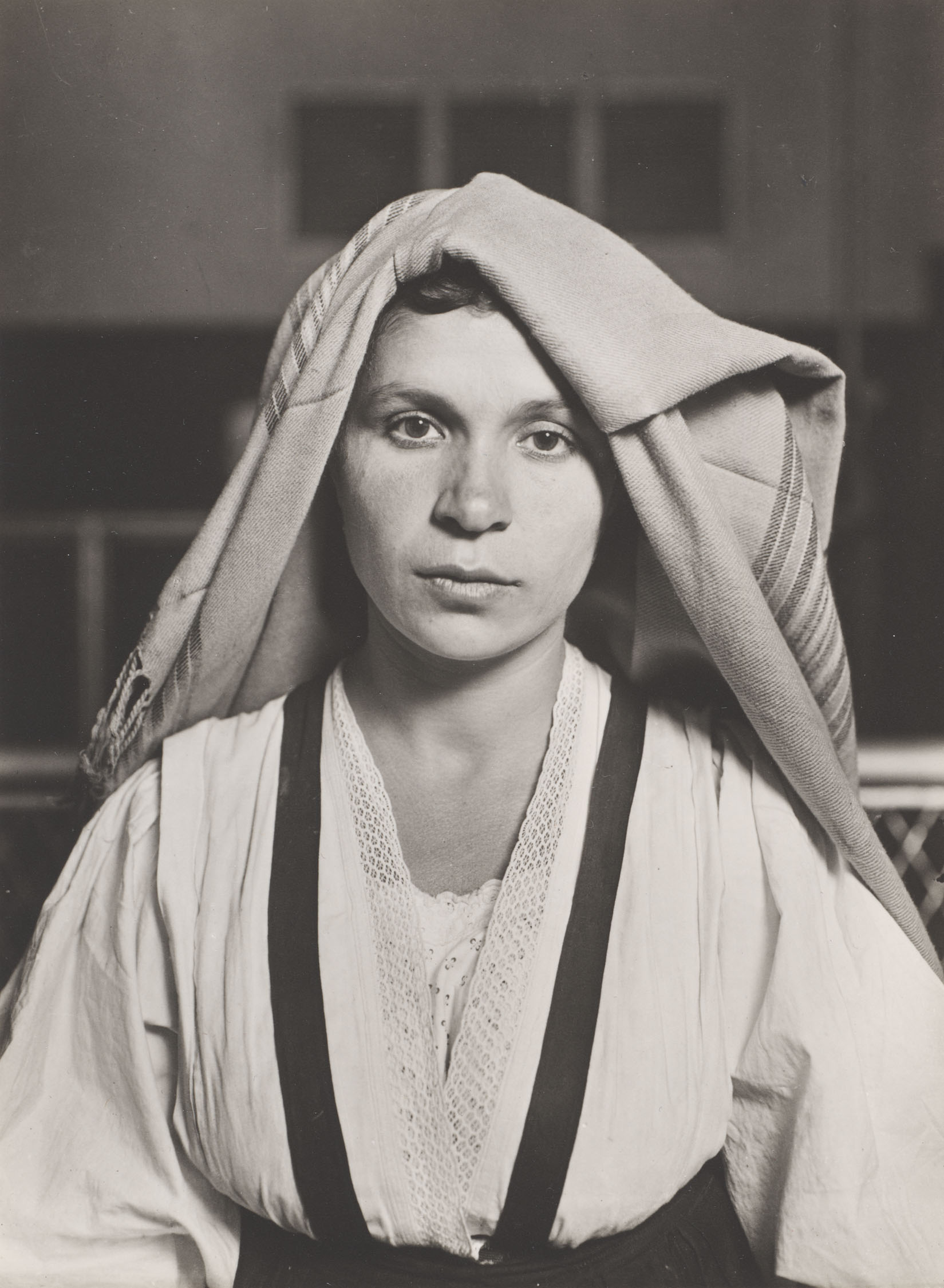
Italo-Albanian woman on Ellis Island, New York, 1905

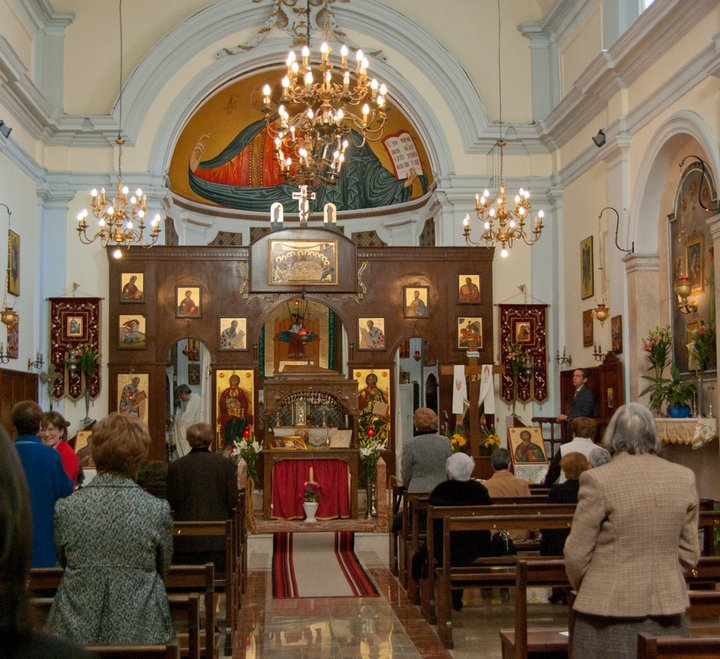
Iconostasis in a church in Piana degli Albanesi, Sicily

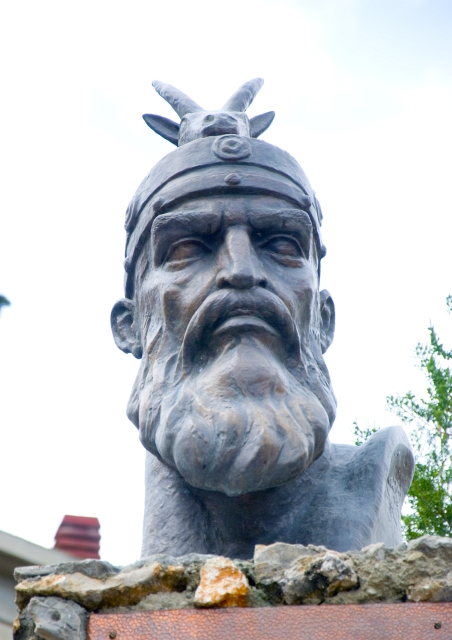
Statue of Albanian hero Gjergji Kastrioti in Civita, Calabria

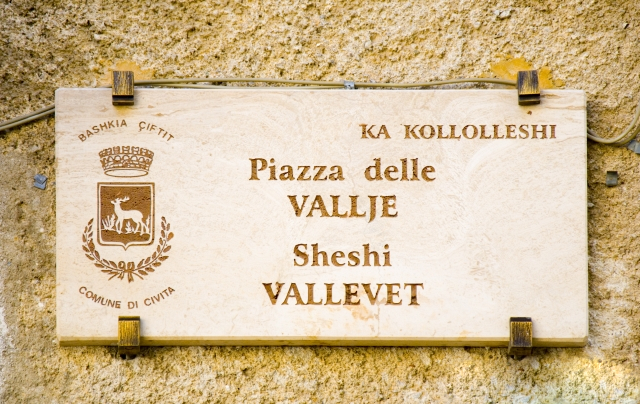
A bilingual for a piazza in Civita

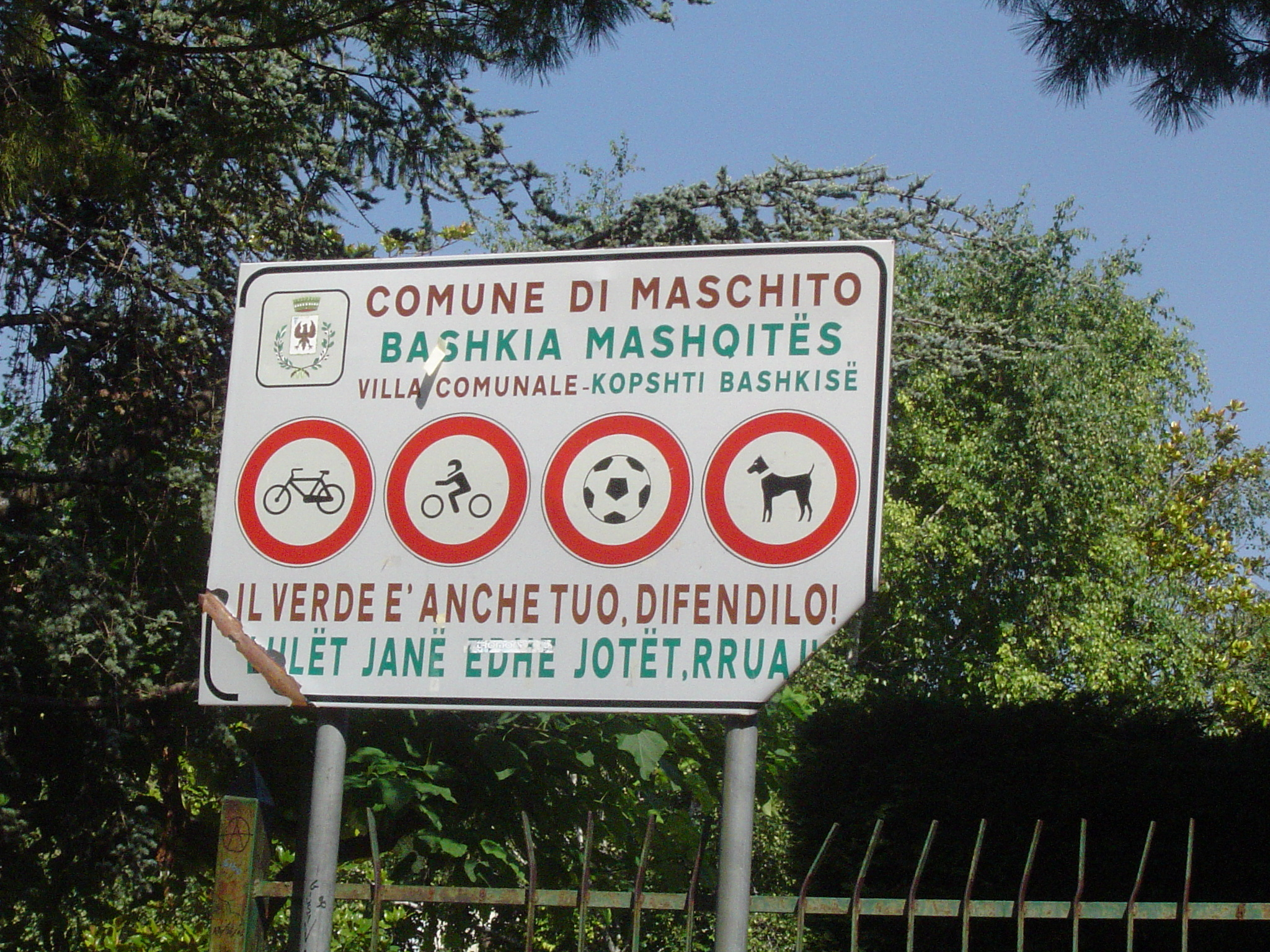
Bilingual sign in Albanian and Italian in Maschito, Basilicata

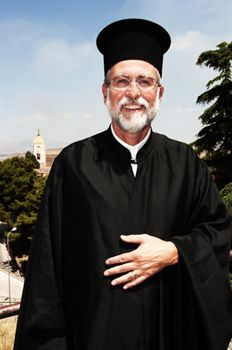
Priest of the Italo-Albanian Catholic Church in Contessa Entellina, Sicily

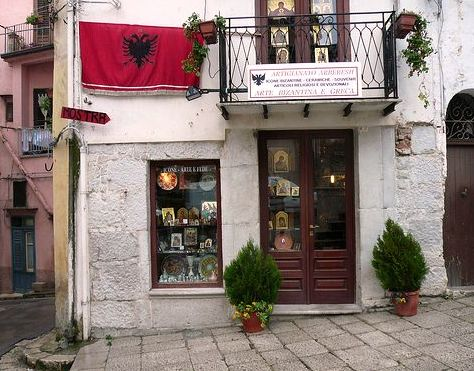
Arbëresh craft-workshop in Piana degli Albanesi

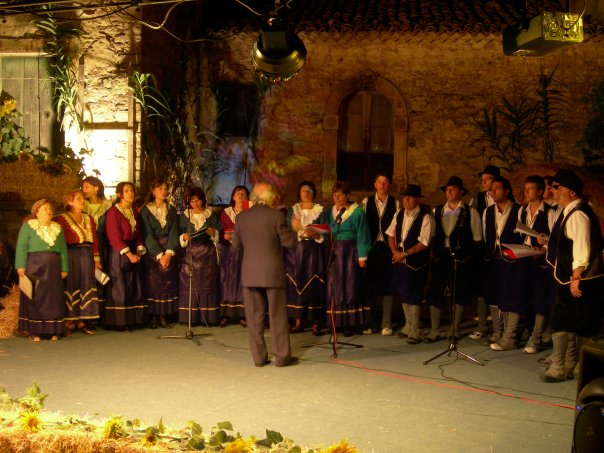
Arbëreshë folk group of Katundi, in Campania

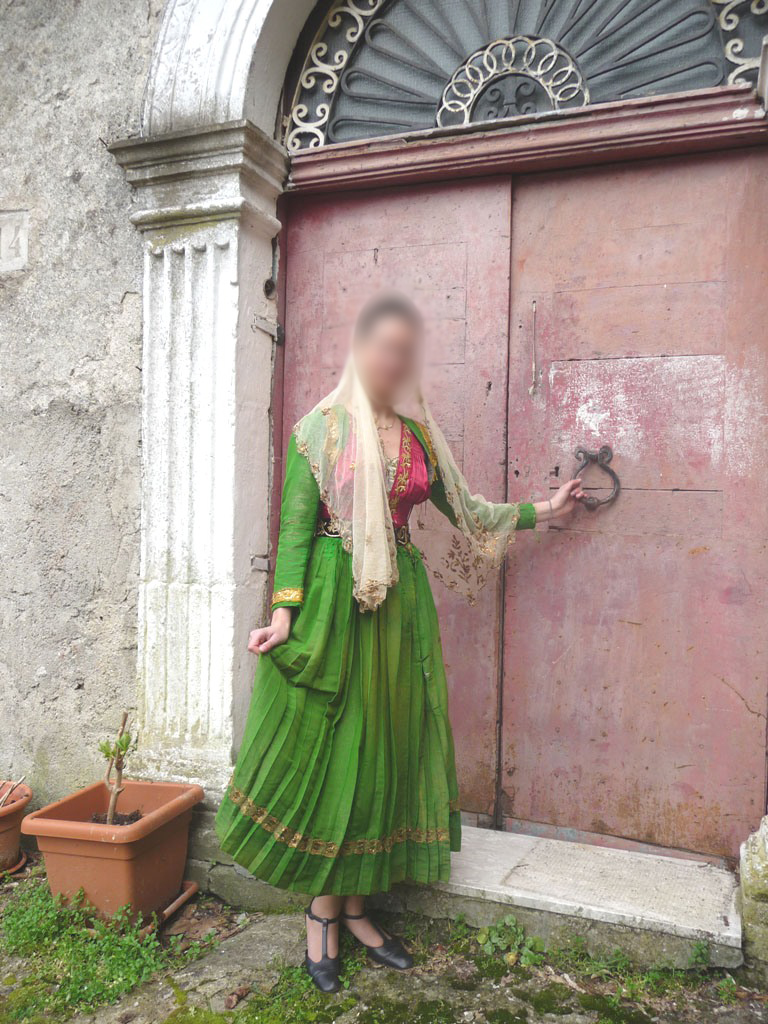
Traditional Arbëreshë costume of San Martino di Finita in Calabria

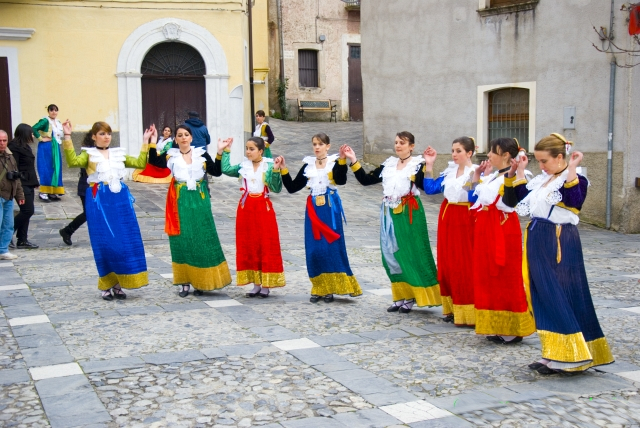
Arbëreshë dance, Civita

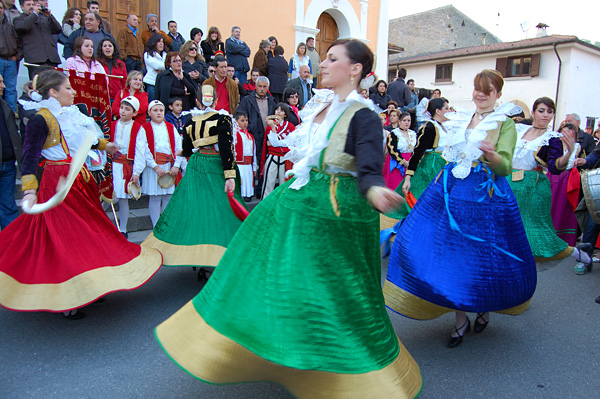
Typical Arbëreshë female costumes of San Basile in Calabria

== See also ==
- Albanians in Italy
- Arvanites
- Culture of Albania
- Illyro-Roman
- Languages of Italy
- Stradioti
