= Santa Caterina Albanese =

- Comune
- Comune di Santa Caterina Albanese
- Location within Italy Location within Calabria
- Coordinates: 39°35′N 16°4′E
- Country: Italy
- Region: Calabria
- Province: Cosenza (CS)

Government
  - Mayor: Roberto Lavalle

Area
  - Total: 17.34 km^{2} (6.70 sq mi)
- Elevation: 472 m (1,549 ft)

Population (2018-01-01)
  - Total: 1,156
  - Density: 66.67/km^{2} (172.7/sq mi)
- Time zone: UTC+1 (CET)
  - Summer (DST): UTC+2 (CEST)
- Postal code: 87010
- Dialing code: 0984
- Website: Official website

Santa Caterina Albanese (Arbëreshë Albanian: Picilia) is an Arbëreshë village and comune in the province of Cosenza in the Calabria region of southern Italy.

The town is bordered by Fagnano Castello, Malvito, Roggiano Gravina and San Marco Argentano.

== People ==
- Anton Santori, writer, playwright and poet of the Albanian National Awakening.
