= Castroregio =

- Comune
- Comune di Castroregio
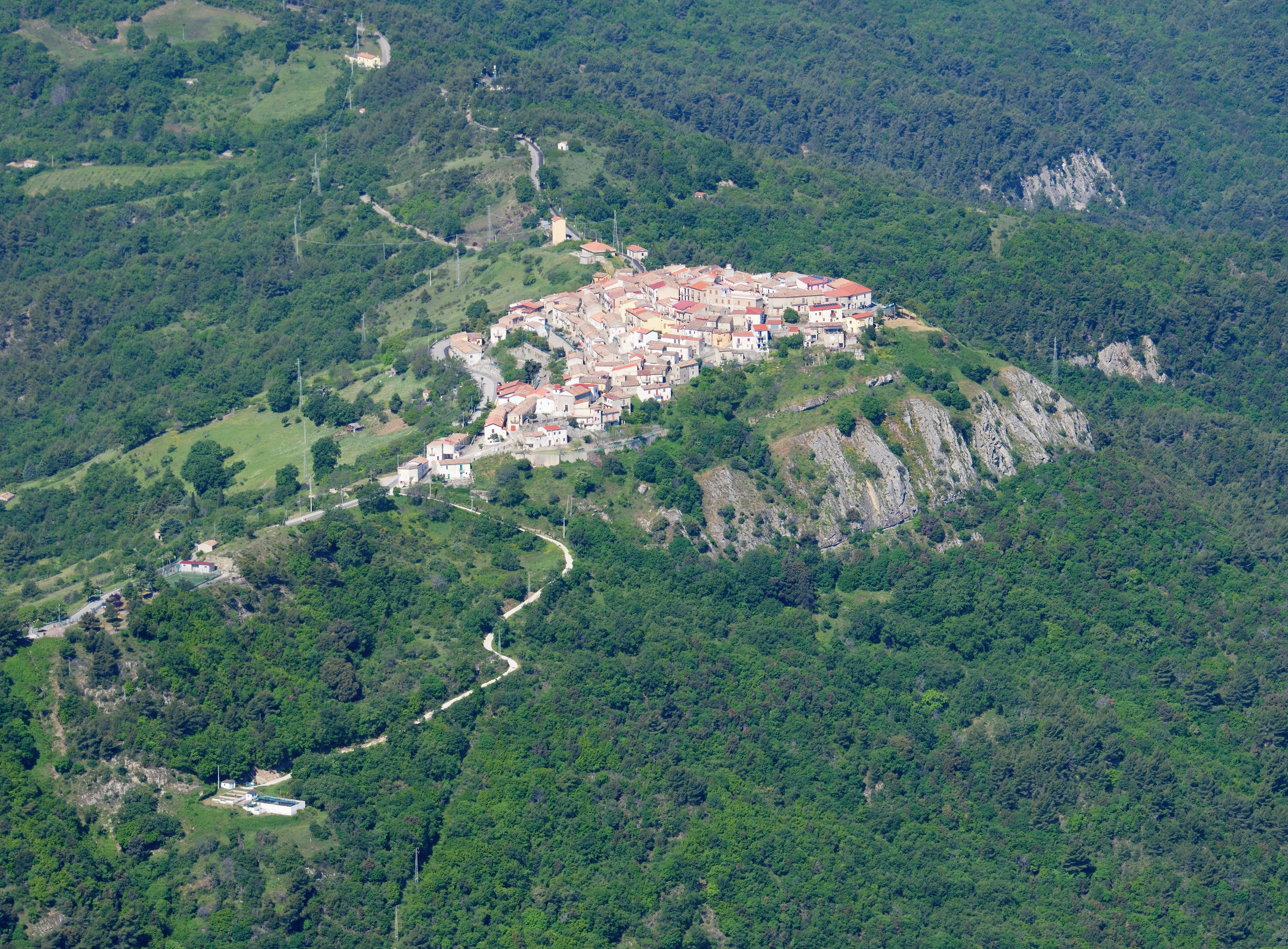

- Location within Italy Location within Calabria
- Coordinates: 39°59′N 16°29′E
- Country: Italy
- Region: Calabria
- Province: Cosenza (CS)

Government
  - Mayor: Alessandro Adduci

Area
  - Total: 42.06 km^{2} (16.24 sq mi)
- Elevation: 819 m (2,687 ft)

Population (31 October 2018)
  - Total: 272
  - Density: 6.47/km^{2} (16.7/sq mi)
- Demonym: Castroregesi
- Time zone: UTC+1 (CET)
  - Summer (DST): UTC+2 (CEST)
- Postal code: 87070
- Dialing code: 0981
- Patron saint: Santa Maria ad Nives
- Saint day: 18 August
- Website: Official website

Castroregio (Arbëreshë Albanian: Kastërnexhi; Calabrian: Castrurìgiu) is an Arbëreshë town and comune in the province of Cosenza in the Calabria region of southern Italy.
