= Marcedusa =

Marcedusa Marçëdhuza
- Comune
- Comune di Marcedusa
- Location within Italy Location within Calabria
- Coordinates: 39°1′35″N 16°50′10″E
- Country: Italy
- Region: Calabria
- Province: Catanzaro (CZ)

Area
  - Total: 15 km^{2} (5.8 sq mi)
- Elevation: 288 m (945 ft)

Population (31 December 2013)
  - Total: 448
  - Density: 30/km^{2} (77/sq mi)
- Time zone: UTC+1 (CET)
  - Summer (DST): UTC+2 (CEST)
- Postal code: 88050
- Dialing code: 0961

Marcedusa (Arbëreshë Albanian: Marçëdhuza) is an Arbëreshë comune and town in the province of Catanzaro in the Calabria region of Italy.
