= Andali =

Andali Andalli
- Comune
- Comune di Andali
- Location within Italy Location within Calabria
- Coordinates: 39°1′N 16°46′E
- Country: Italy
- Region: Calabria
- Province: Catanzaro (CZ)

Government
  - Mayor: Pietro Antonio Peta

Area
  - Total: 17 km^{2} (6.6 sq mi)
- Elevation: 650 m (2,130 ft)

Population (Dec. 2013)
  - Total: 782
  - Density: 46/km^{2} (120/sq mi)
- Time zone: UTC+1 (CET)
  - Summer (DST): UTC+2 (CEST)
- Postal code: 88050
- Dialing code: 0961
- Website: Official website

Andali (Arbëreshë Albanian: Andalli) is an Arbëreshë comune and town is the province of Catanzaro in the Calabria region of southern Italy.
