= Barile =

Barile Barilli (Arbëreshë Albanian)
- Comune
- Comune di Barile
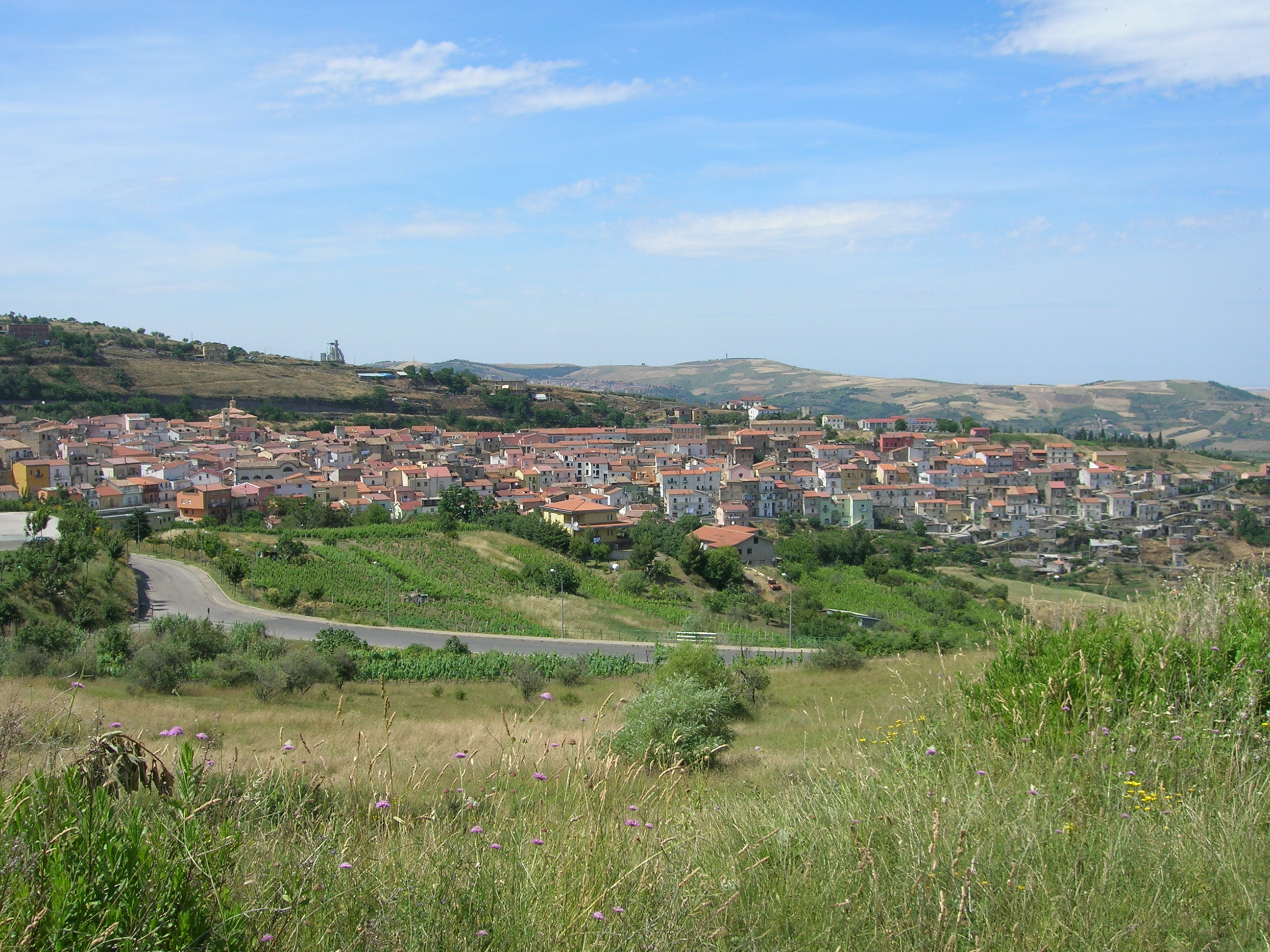
- View of Barile

- Location within Italy Location within Basilicata
- Coordinates: 40°57′N 15°40′E
- Country: Italy
- Region: Basilicata
- Province: Potenza (PZ)
- Frazioni: Cerrocigliano

Government
  - Mayor: Antonio Murano

Area
  - Total: 24.13 km^{2} (9.32 sq mi)
- Elevation: 620 m (2,030 ft)

Population (January 1, 2025)
  - Total: 2,524
  - Density: 104.6/km^{2} (270.9/sq mi)
- Demonyms: Barilesi (Barliotë in Arbëreshë)
- Time zone: UTC+1 (CET)
  - Summer (DST): UTC+2 (CEST)
- Postal code: 85022
- Dialing code: 0972
- ISTAT code: 076011
- Website: Official website

Barile (Arbëreshë Albanian: Barilli; Lucano: Barìle) is a comune (municipality) in the province of Potenza, in the Italian region of Basilicata. It is bounded by the comuni, of Ginestra, Rapolla, Rionero in Vulture, Ripacandida, and Venosa. The town is an ancient Arbëreshë settlement, and the population still maintains strong links with that culture. The noun, barile, means 'barrel' in Italian.

The people of Barile speak Italian and Arbëreshë, a dialect of Albanian. The locals managed to preserve Albanian language and culture over the centuries, as the village was founded by groups of Greek and Albanian immigrants. The first flow of immigrants is considered to have settled in the area in 1447.

== Main sights ==
- Church of Madonna di Costantinopoli: it was probably built in the middle of the 17th century. According to tradition, Our Lady appeared in a dream to a farmer, and she pointed to a place where, if he would dig, he would find her image painted on the tuff. The building has a wall fresco of the Madonna in the Byzantine style of the 14th century.
- Mother Church, also dedicated to the protector of the city. It houses a 15th-century Byzantine painting, representing the Madonna of Constantinople, and a 17th-century canvas, depicting the Virgin Mary pierced by seven stilettos.
- Church of St. Athanasius and St. Rocco, probably built in 1640 under the supervision of Raffaele Daniele, the oldest of the Brotherhood. The earthquakes of 1931 and 1980 further damaged the structure, which has been restored several times. Inside the church are four paintings of the 1640 Neapolitan school. A canvas of the Neapolitan school, depicting the Madonna del Carmine, painted at the end of the 18th century is preserved in the church of the Carmelite convent of Santa Maria del Carmine.
- Church of Nicholas, with a 1464 canvas of the Annunciation, and another painting by Girolamo Bresciano of the 17th century.
- In the town square is La Fontana dello Steccato (English: "The Fountain of the Fence"), built in 1713 and depicting three figures with apotropaic heads that, according to the etymology, should keep far from the fountain any magic and malignant influences. At the top is visible a coat of arms, where there is carved the Madonna of Constantinople with the Christ Child.
- Seshë (which means "square" in the ancient Arbëreshë language) are caves dug in the rock by the first Albanian immigrants, nowadays used to store Aglianico wine. The cellars of the Seshë are visible in the film The Gospel according to Matthew (1964) by Pier Paolo Pasolini. In August, these cellars host the cultural event "Cellar Wine & Art", in which various forms of art such as music, painting, cinema, and sculpture meet with Aglianico and diverse gastronomic products typical of the area.
