= Plataci =

Plataci Bashkia e Pllatënit
- Comune
- Comune di Plataci
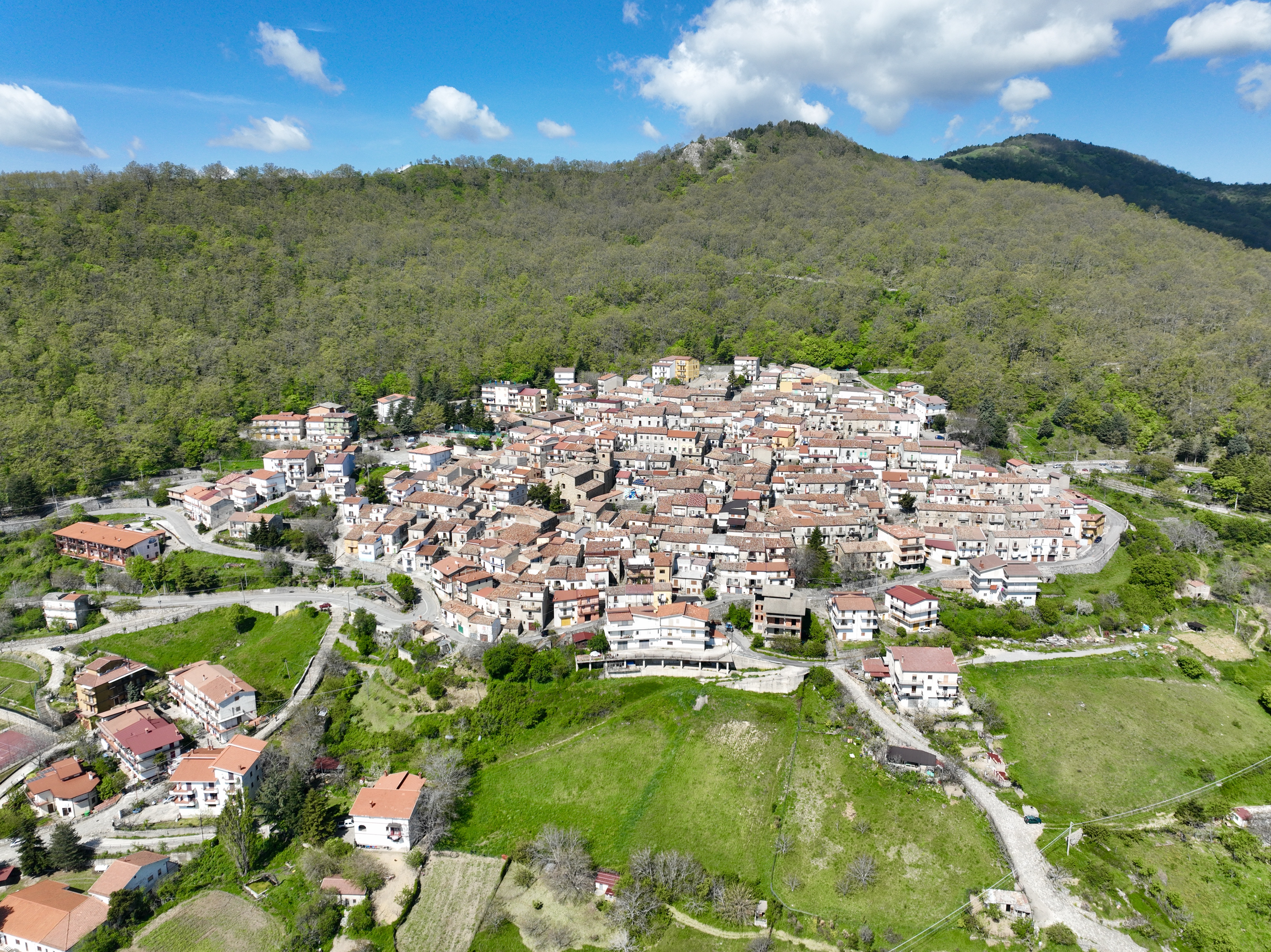
- Aerial view of Plataci

- Location within Italy Location within Calabria
- Coordinates: 39°54′N 16°26′E
- Country: Italy
- Region: Calabria
- Province: Cosenza (CS)

Government
  - Mayor: Francesco Tursi

Area
  - Total: 49.41 km^{2} (19.08 sq mi)
- Elevation: 930 m (3,050 ft)

Population (2008)
  - Total: 876
  - Density: 17.7/km^{2} (45.9/sq mi)
- Demonym: Platacesi
- Time zone: UTC+1 (CET)
  - Summer (DST): UTC+2 (CEST)
- Postal code: 87070
- Dialing code: 0981
- ISTAT code: 078100
- Patron saint: St. John the Baptist
- Saint day: Last Sunday in September
- Website: Official website

Plataci (Arbëreshë Albanian: Pllatëni; Calabrian: Pràtaci) is an Arbëreshë town and comune in the province of Cosenza in the Calabria region of southern Italy.
