= Cerzeto =

Cerzeto Qanë (Arbëreshë Albanian)
- Comune
- Comune di Cerzeto
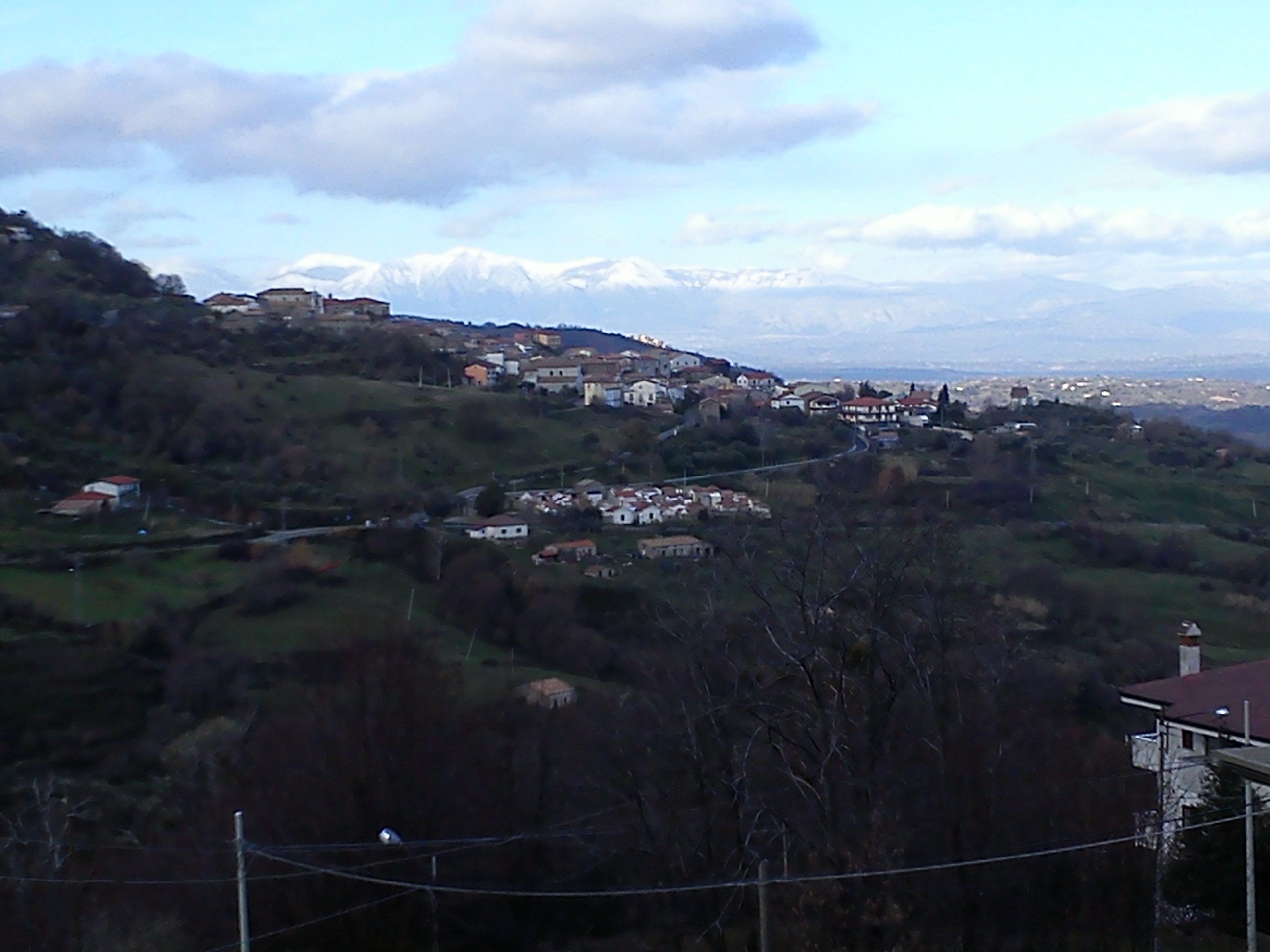

- Coat of arms

- Location within Italy Location within Calabria
- Coordinates: 39°31′N 16°7′E
- Country: Italy
- Region: Calabria
- Province: Cosenza (CS)
- Frazioni: Cavallerizzo, San Giacomo

Government
  - Mayor: Giuseppe Rizzo

Area
  - Total: 21 km^{2} (8.1 sq mi)
- Elevation: 450 m (1,480 ft)

Population (30 November 2018)
  - Total: 1,320
  - Density: 63/km^{2} (160/sq mi)
- Demonym: Cerzeti or Cerzetani
- Time zone: UTC+1 (CET)
  - Summer (DST): UTC+2 (CEST)
- Postal code: 87040
- Dialing code: 0984
- Patron saint: St. Nicholas of Bari
- Saint day: 29 June
- Website: Official website

Cerzeto (Arbëreshë Albanian: Qanë) is an Arbëreshë town and comune in the province of Cosenza in the Calabria region of southern Italy.

== People ==
- Karmel Kandreva, writer and poet
