= San Basile =

- Comune
- Comune di San Basile
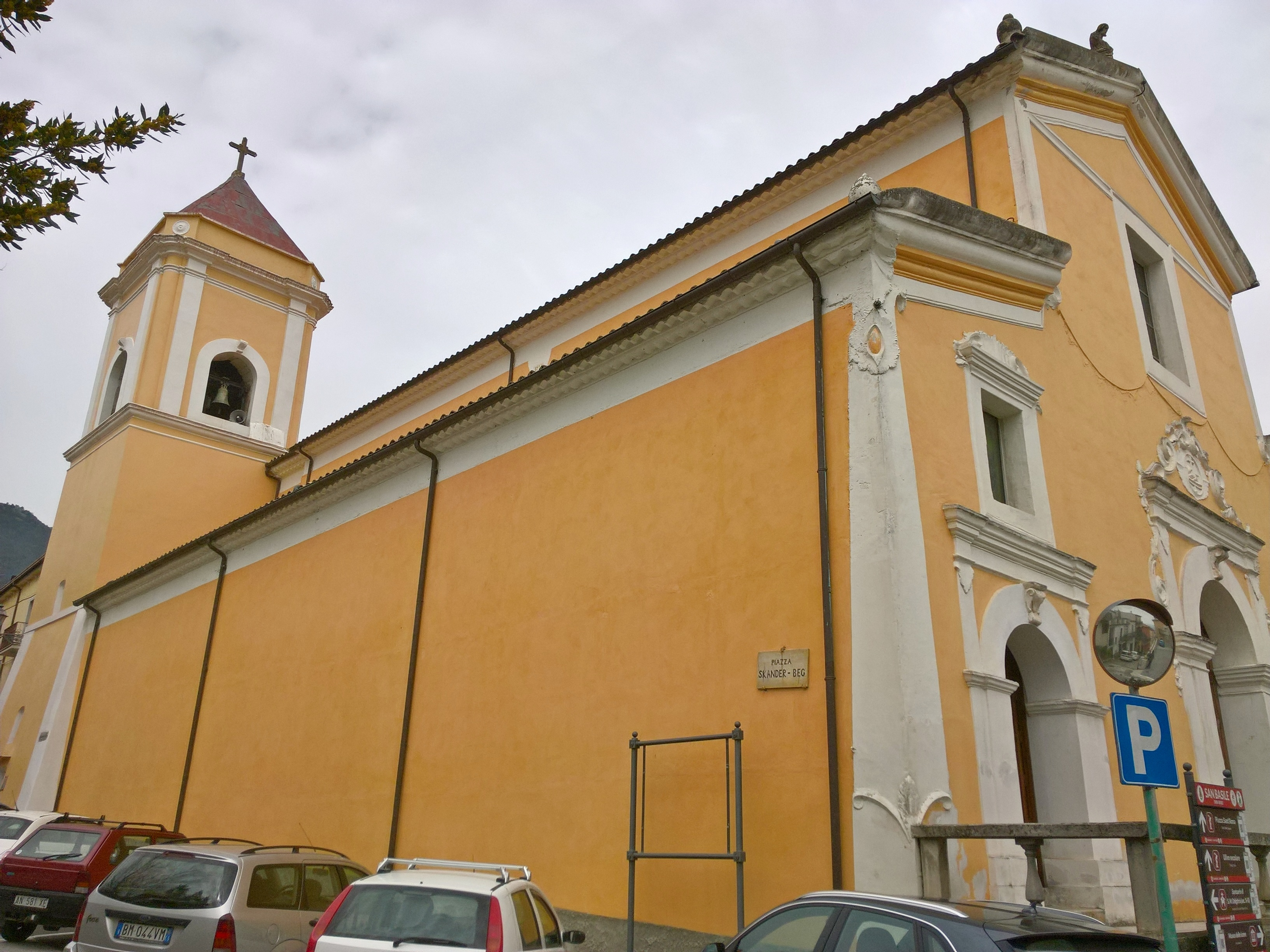
- Church of St. John the Baptist.

- Location within Italy Location within Calabria
- Coordinates: 39°49′N 16°10′E
- Country: Italy
- Region: Calabria
- Province: Cosenza (CS)

Government
  - Mayor: Vincenzo Tamburi

Area
  - Total: 18.67 km^{2} (7.21 sq mi)
- Elevation: 540 m (1,770 ft)

Population (2018-01-01)
  - Total: 1,283
  - Density: 68.72/km^{2} (178.0/sq mi)
- Demonym: Sambasilesi (Arbëreshë: Shënvasilotë)
- Time zone: UTC+1 (CET)
  - Summer (DST): UTC+2 (CEST)
- Postal code: 87010
- Dialing code: 0981
- Patron saint: John the Baptist, e Santa Maria Odigitria
- Saint day: 25 May, martedì dopo la pentecoste
- Website: Official website

San Basile (Arbëreshë Albanian: Shën Vasili) is a town and comune in the province of Cosenza in the Calabria region of southern Italy.

Both Italian and Arbëresh are spoken in the town.
