= Casalvecchio di Puglia =

Casalvecchio di Puglia Kazallveqi
- Comune
- Comune di Casalvecchio di Puglia
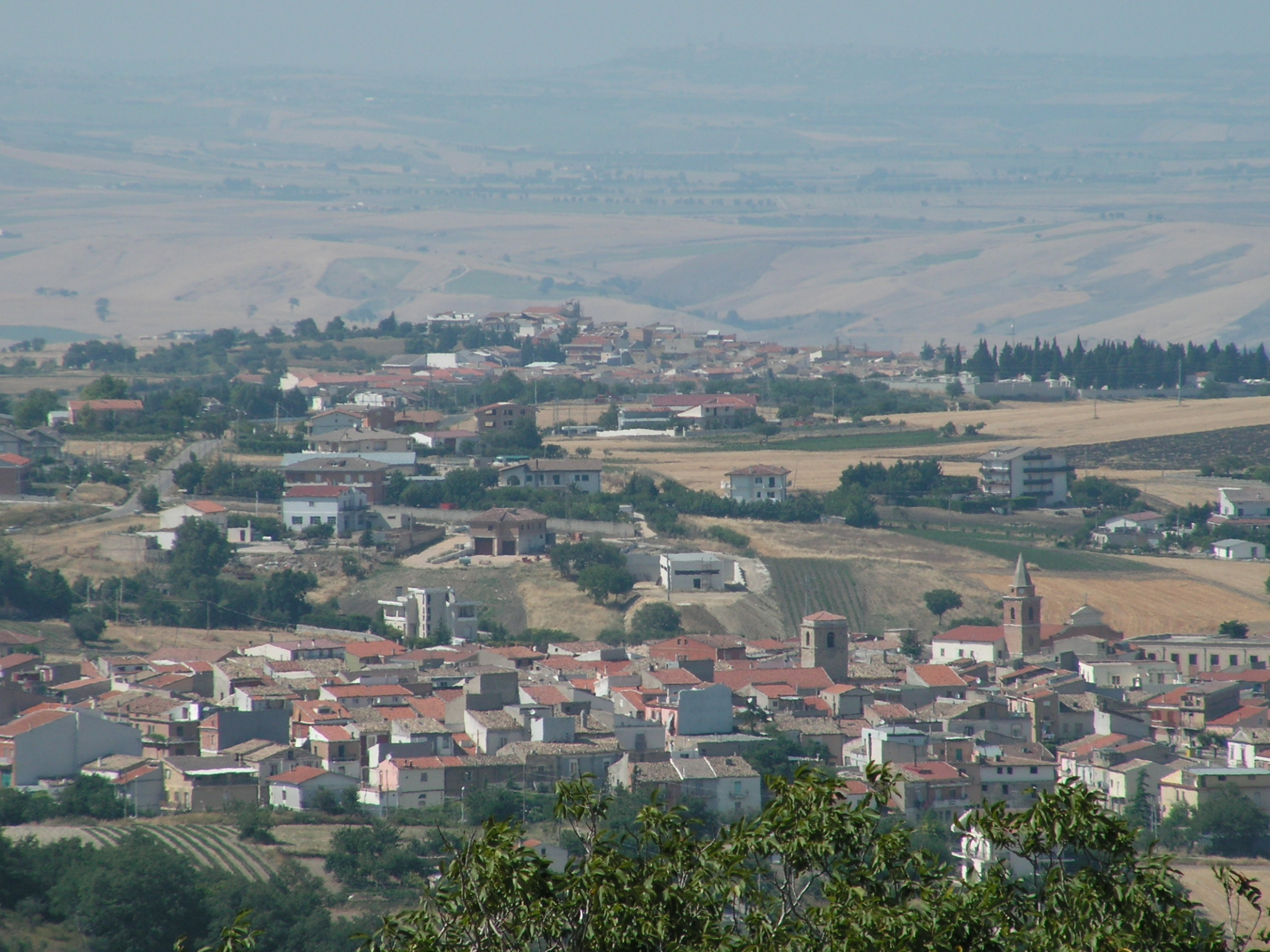
- View from Castelnuovo della Daunia

- Location within Italy Location within Apulia
- Coordinates: 41°36′N 15°7′E
- Country: Italy
- Region: Apulia
- Province: Foggia (FG)

Government
  - Mayor: Noè Andreano

Area
  - Total: 31.93 km^{2} (12.33 sq mi)
- Elevation: 465 m (1,526 ft)

Population (28 February 2017)
  - Total: 1,863
  - Density: 58.35/km^{2} (151.1/sq mi)
- Demonym: Casalvecchiesi or Kazallveqotra
- Time zone: UTC+1 (CET)
  - Summer (DST): UTC+2 (CEST)
- Postal code: 71030
- Dialing code: 0881
- Website: Official website

Casalvecchio (Arbëreshë Albanian: Kazallveqi) is an Arbëreshë comune and village in the Province of Foggia, Apulia, southern Italy. Mostly originating from a 15th-century migration of Albanians, the residents have subsisted by family farming. Of those native to the area for generations, many have continued to use Arbëresh, even those of the post–World War II generation. Arbëresh is the official language together with Italian

== History ==
In 1461 near Monte Gargano, in the southeastern Apennine Mountains, a group of 5000 immigrants from Albania fled the enculturation of the Ottoman Turks and Islam. They were sent by the Albanian leader Skanderbeg. This part of Apulia was granted to the incomers by the king of Naples.
