= Mongrassano =

- Comune
- Comune di Mongrassano
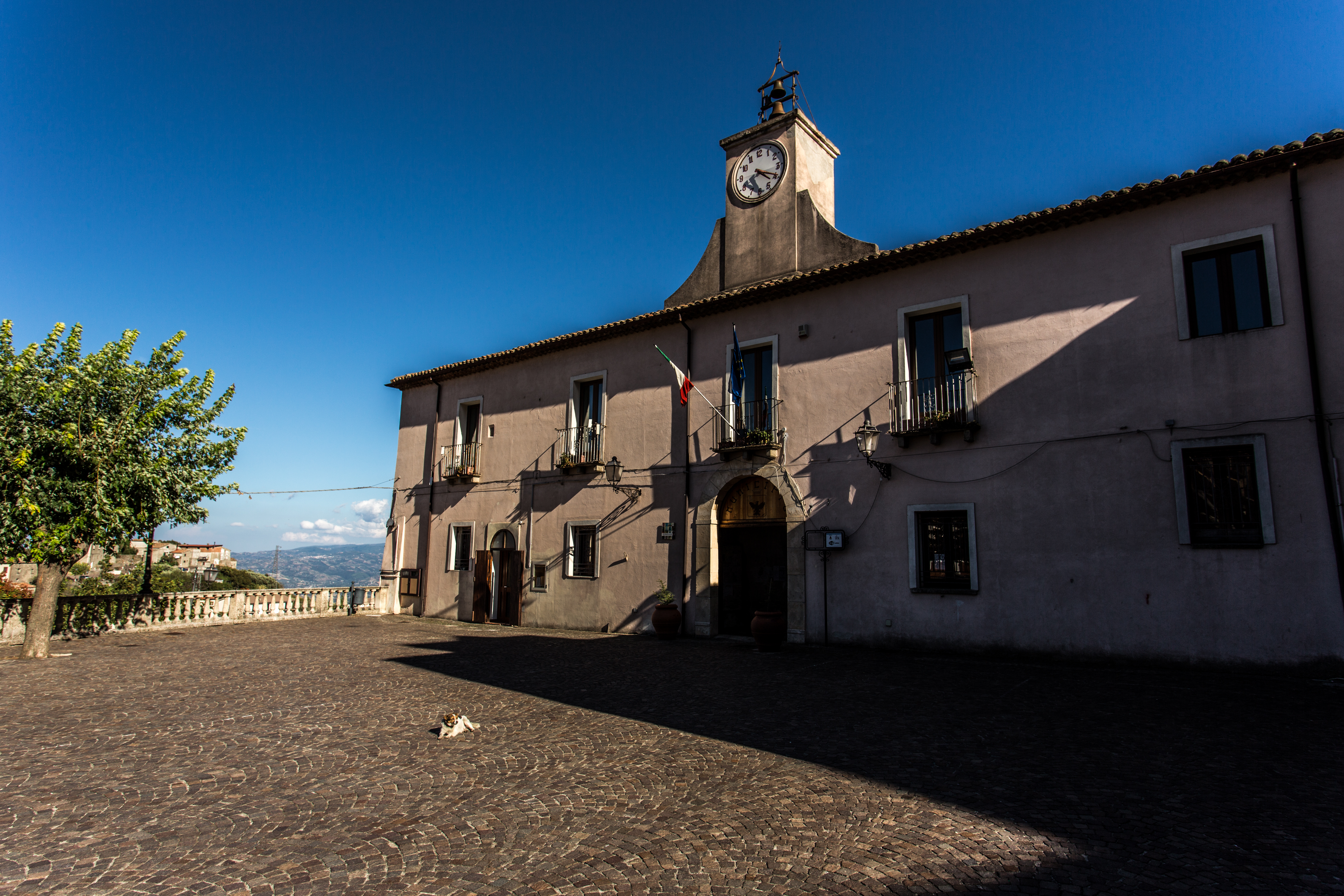

- Coat of arms

- Location within Italy Location within Calabria
- Coordinates: 39°32′N 16°7′E
- Country: Italy
- Region: Calabria
- Province: Cosenza (CS)

Government
  - Mayor: Ferruccio Mariani

Area
  - Total: 35.16 km^{2} (13.58 sq mi)
- Elevation: 540 m (1,770 ft)

Population (31 October 2017)
  - Total: 1,562
  - Density: 44.43/km^{2} (115.1/sq mi)
- Demonym: Mongrassanesi
- Time zone: UTC+1 (CET)
  - Summer (DST): UTC+2 (CEST)
- Postal code: 87040
- Dialing code: 0984
- Patron saint: St. Lucy of Syracuse
- Saint day: Third Sunday in August
- Website: Official website

Mongrassano (Arbëreshë Albanian: Mungrasana) is a town and comune in the province of Cosenza in the Calabria region of southern Italy, located 42 kilometers northwest of Cosenza.The town is part of the Comunità Montana Media Valle Crate, a regional association of municipalities.

== History ==
The town's history dates back to at least the 12th century, when it was known by various names such as Mons Crasanus, Moncressano, Mocrasani, Montegrassano, or Magrosani. Originally, Mongrassano consisted of two hamlets: Serra di Leo and Mongrassano. The town's urban structure is typical of many settlements of Albanian origin in the region, characterized by circular streets, known as gijtonia.

Mongrassano saw an influx of Albanian political refugees either in 1459 or early in the 16th century, which significantly influenced its culture and development. On 20 July 1459, the Prince of Bisignano transferred the civil jurisdiction of the city to the Bishop of San Marco. Over the years, the town changed hands, with the Gaetani family acquiring the territory in 1642, and later selling it to the Marquesses of Fuscaldo in 1688, who retained ownership until the end of the feudal system in 1806.

In 1807, Mongrassano became state-owned, and in 1811 it was joined with Serra di Leo. By 1816, it was elevated to the status of a comune, with Serra di Leo as its frazione (a subdivision or hamlet).

== Language and dialect ==
Officially the inhabitants speak Italian. Traditionally, the dialect is of Albanian origin (Arbëresh), but is spoken by an increasingly restricted number of inhabitants.

== Festivals ==
The patron saint of Mongrassano is Saint Catherine of Siena, but the most important festival in the town is Saint Lucy that occurs during the month of August.
