= List of municipalities of the Province of Crotone =

The following is a list of the 27 municipalities (comuni) of the Province of Crotone in the region of Calabria in Italy.

== List ==
Municipality	Population (2026)	Area (km²)	Density
Belvedere di Spinello	1,878	30.31	62.0
Caccuri	1,497	61.38	24.4
Carfizzi	534	20.73	25.8
Casabona	2,163	67.67	32.0
Castelsilano	902	40.06	22.5
Cerenzia	983	21.97	44.7
Cirò	2,321	71.05	32.7
Cirò Marina	14,233	41.68	341.5
Cotronei	5,068	79.20	64.0
Crotone	58,136	182.00	319.4
Crucoli	2,752	50.43	54.6
Cutro	9,165	133.69	68.6
Isola di Capo Rizzuto	18,985	126.65	149.9
Melissa	3,297	51.63	63.9
Mesoraca	5,701	94.79	60.1
Pallagorio	882	44.48	19.8
Petilia Policastro	8,430	98.35	85.7
Rocca di Neto	5,286	44.93	117.6
Roccabernarda	3,045	64.89	46.9
San Mauro Marchesato	1,868	41.91	44.6
San Nicola dell'Alto	645	7.85	82.2
Santa Severina	1,829	52.31	35.0
Savelli	1,005	48.92	20.5
Scandale	2,856	54.26	52.6
Strongoli	6,113	85.56	71.4
Umbriatico	685	73.36	9.3
Verzino	1,506	45.63	33.0

== See also ==
- List of municipalities of Calabria
- List of municipalities of Italy
