= Savelli (surname) =

Savelli is an Italian surname that may refer to:

- Alessandro Savelli (1905–1930), Italian football player
- Antonello Savelli (c. 1450–1498), Italian condottiero, member of the Savelli family
- Fabrizio Savelli (1607–1659), Italian military leader, member of the Savelli family
- Federico Savelli (died 1649), Italian military commander, member of the Savelli family
- Giacomo Savelli (cardinal) (1523–1587), Italian Roman Catholic cardinal and bishop, member of the Savelli family
- Giovanni Battista Savelli (1422–1498), Italian cardinal, member of the Savelli family
- Guy Savelli, American martial artist
- Jean-Marc Savelli (born 1955), French pianist
- Luca Savelli (1190–1266), Roman senator
- Pandolfo Savelli (died 1306), member of the Savelli family
- Pope Honorius III (Cencio Savelli, 1150–1227), Pope and member of the Savelli family
- Pope Honorius IV (Giacomo Savelli, c.1210–1287), Pope and member of the Savelli family
- Silvio Savelli (died 1515), Italian condottiero, member of the Savelli family

== See also ==
- Savelli family
- Savelli (disambiguation)
