= Santa Severina =

Santa Severina Santa Siverina
- Comune
- Comune di Santa Severina
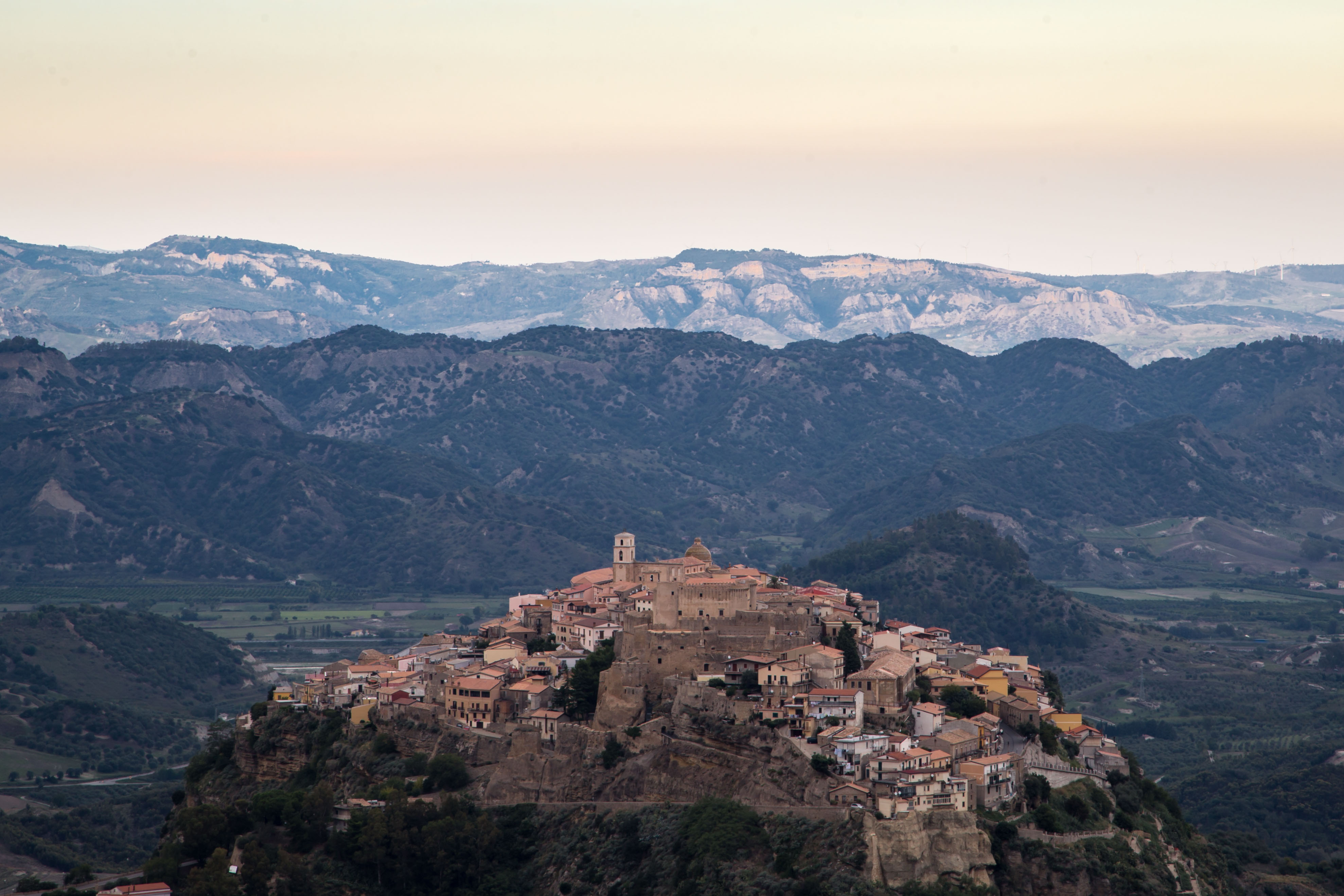

- Location within Italy Location within Calabria
- Coordinates: 39°9′N 16°55′E
- Country: Italy
- Region: Calabria
- Province: Crotone (KR)
- Frazioni: Altilia

Area
  - Total: 51 km^{2} (20 sq mi)
- Elevation: 350 m (1,150 ft)

Population (2018-01-01)
  - Total: 2,326
  - Density: 46/km^{2} (120/sq mi)
- Demonym: Santaseverinesi
- Time zone: UTC+1 (CET)
  - Summer (DST): UTC+2 (CEST)
- Postal code: 88832
- Dialing code: 0962
- Patron saint: Santa Anastasìa
- Saint day: 29 October
- Website: Official website

Santa Severina (Sicilian: Santa Siverina) is a town and comune in the province of Crotone, in the Calabria region of southern Italy. It is the Borgo più bello d'Italia ("The most beautiful village of Italy").

== Name ==
The name derives from ancient Siberine (῾Αγία Σεβερίνη, Σεβεριάνη). There is no saint named Severina in the Greek or Roman calendar of saints.

== History ==
It is the birthplace of Pope Zachary and also of Henry Aristippus, who was a religious scholar and writer at the court of the Norman Kingdom of Sicily.

== Ecclesiastical History ==
The bishopric -established around 400 AD- and -since around 100 AD- Metropolitan Archdiocese of Santa Severina (v.) was suppressed on 30 September 1986, its title and territory being merged into the Metropolitan Roman Catholic Archdiocese of Crotone–Santa Severina.

== Geography ==
The town is bordered by Belvedere di Spinello, Caccuri, Castelsilano, Rocca di Neto, Roccabernarda, San Mauro Marchesato and Scandale.

== Culture ==
There is a cultural festival which is held each year in August in Santa Severina, focusing on traditional Italian music.

== Twin towns ==
- Mangalia, Romania
