= Savelli =

Savelli may refer to:

- Savelli family
- Savelli (surname)
- Savelli, Calabria, a comune and town in southern Italy
- PalaSavelli, an indoor sporting arena in Porto San Giorgio, Italy
