= Casabona =

- Comune
- Comune di Casabona
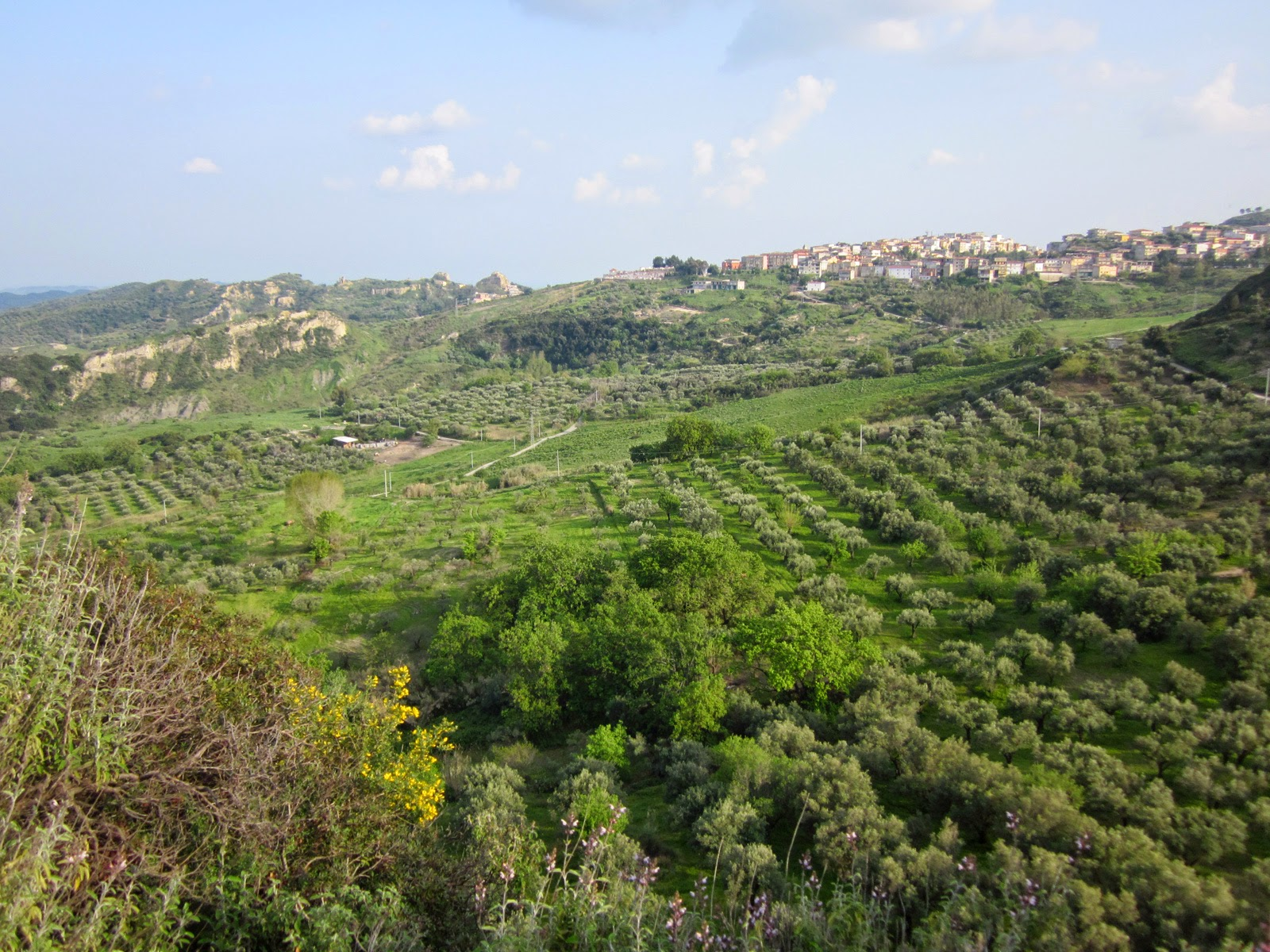

- Location within Italy Location within Calabria
- Coordinates: 39°15′N 16°57′E
- Country: Italy
- Region: Calabria
- Province: Crotone (KR)
- Frazioni: Zinga

Government
  - Mayor: Francesco Seminario

Area
  - Total: 68 km^{2} (26 sq mi)
- Elevation: 304 m (997 ft)

Population (December 31, 2004)
  - Total: 3,998
  - Density: 59/km^{2} (150/sq mi)
- Demonym: Casabonesi
- Time zone: UTC+1 (CET)
  - Summer (DST): UTC+2 (CEST)
- Postal code: 88822
- Dialing code: 0962
- Patron saint: San Nicola
- Saint day: December 6
- Website: Official website

Casabona (Calabrian: Casivonu) is a comune and town with a population of about 4,000 people in the province of Crotone, in Calabria, southern Italy.

== History ==
Legends surrounding Casabona, or what would later become Casabona, date to antiquity. According to Strabo, the mythical king Philoctetes established several cities in Italy, including Petilia, Old Crimissa and a settlement called Chone. This Chone, part of Magna Graecia, is thought to have been ancient Casabona.

An early reference to the town dates to 1198, when Pope Innocent III penned a letter to a certain Nicodemus in order to confirm the existence of certain assets in the "territory of Casabona". By 1300, Casabona was the last town in the fiefs of the Abenante family; in 1472, it was passed to Diego di Cavaniglia, count of Montella. After the Kingdom of Naples was invaded by Charles VIII of France, the town was sold to the House of Barcelona.

Casabona was destroyed at least once by a major earthquake, though it's not certain when this occurred. According to some, the town was destroyed by an earthquake in 1638, according to others, by a quake in 1783. In any event, the earthquake destroyed nearly everything in the town, save for the Convent of San Bernardino, around which some of the population gathered to rebuild.

=== Zinga ===
According to a memoir left by the archpriests and curates who administered Casabona's church from 1908 to 1913, it was believed Frederick II, Duke of Swabia had founded Zinga, originally called Cinga, with the parish being established in 1343. However, there are no records from this era that mention Cinga, a 1276 cedula mentions Cerenzia, Caccuri, and Casabona, but not Cinga. It is more likely that Cinga's foundation dates to the War of the Sicilian Vespers, around the time the Almogavars laid siege to Umbriatico and the surrounding lands of Santa Marina, San Nicola dell'Alto and Maratea.

Cinga first appears in the historical record on a 1325 document referring to the payment of tithes from "Dopnus Ioh.es de Cinga" to the Holy See, in the diocese of Umbriatico. A second document, also from the beginning of the fourteenth century, reported in the manuscripts of Camillus de Lellis, concerns a dispute over the borders of Cerenzia, and names the lord of the "Motta di Cinga", Giovanni Rocca. Cinga is not mentioned again until the mid-fifteenth century, during the time of Alfonso V of Aragon's descent into Calabria to tame the rebellion of the Marquis of Crotone, Antonio Centelles. On 11 December 1444, while besieging the city of Crotone, the king granted immunity to Uriello Malatacca de Casabuono, baron of the castrum of Cinga, for 25 years due to the poverty of the land. Uriello's predecessor, Elisabetta Malatacca, had been the feudal lord of Cinga.

In 1506, Ferdinand II of Aragon granted rights to the city of Crotone, leading to the rise of three concurrent barons of Zinga, Giovanni Antonio Pipino, Nardo Lucifero, and Bartolomeo Tibaldo. Having sided with the Kingdom of France during the War of the League of Cognac, Pipino was accused of treason and stripped of his fief. However, after only 8 years, the Pipinos reclaimed their estate in 1536. In 1558, Propsero Lucifero, first born of Marcantonio Lucifero, married Faustina Prospero, thus transferring the fief to him. In the second half of the sixteenth century, the fiefdom, despite an increase in the population, was almost depopulated. Despite retaining the title of castrum, Zinga became little more than a small village. As the local church had no income, the priesthood of Casabona cared for the citizenry, leading to even more leaving Zinga. Not even priests would live in the town. In 1618, the baron Oratio Lucifero sold Zinga to Giacomo d'Aquino for 20,600 ducats. In the same year, Iacobo Malfitano assumed baronship over the frazione. A series of earthquakes in 1638 complicated matters further. Having belonged to the Diocese of Umbriatico since the town's formation, archbishop Antonio Ricciulli laid the responsibility of overseeing the town on Iacobo's successor Francesco, as the barony had refused to assign dowry. At this point in time, Zinga is said to have no more than 70 inhabitants. Francesco's son Giacomo succeeded him and eventually sold Zinga again in 1647, this time to Epaminonda Ferrari. The Malfitano's leadership did not prove auspicious for Zinga, as the population continued to decline, to the point that only a single bishop resided in the church. An incredibly destructive earthquake struck Calabria in 1659 which destroyed Zinga. The town was rebuilt on a nearby hill and repopulated, as evidenced by a bishop's document in May 1662 which says as much. The new town had less than 200 inhabitants, and despite still belonging to the parish had not yet erected a church. In 1688, Epaminonda's grandson Giovan Battista Rota assumed the baronry, however he died childless a year later and the fiefdom was forfeited per law, that is until Giovan's aunt, wife to the baron of Cereznia contested the forfeiture and had the claim returned to the Rota family. In reality, the barons of Cerenzia held true power over the locale. By 1700, Zinga had a population of 300. The town remained under the Rota family for most of the eighteenth century until they produced a baroness which married into the Savelli nobility, thus transferring the baronry to their name. The third Savelli baron, Tommaso Giannuzzi Savelli, sold Zinga to Nicola Barberio for 72000 ducats in 1802. Separate churches began to spring up in Zinga, some better maintained than others.

In 1811, Zinga officially became a frazione of Casabona.
