= Scandale =

Scandale Greek: Scandáli
- Comune
- Comune di Scandale
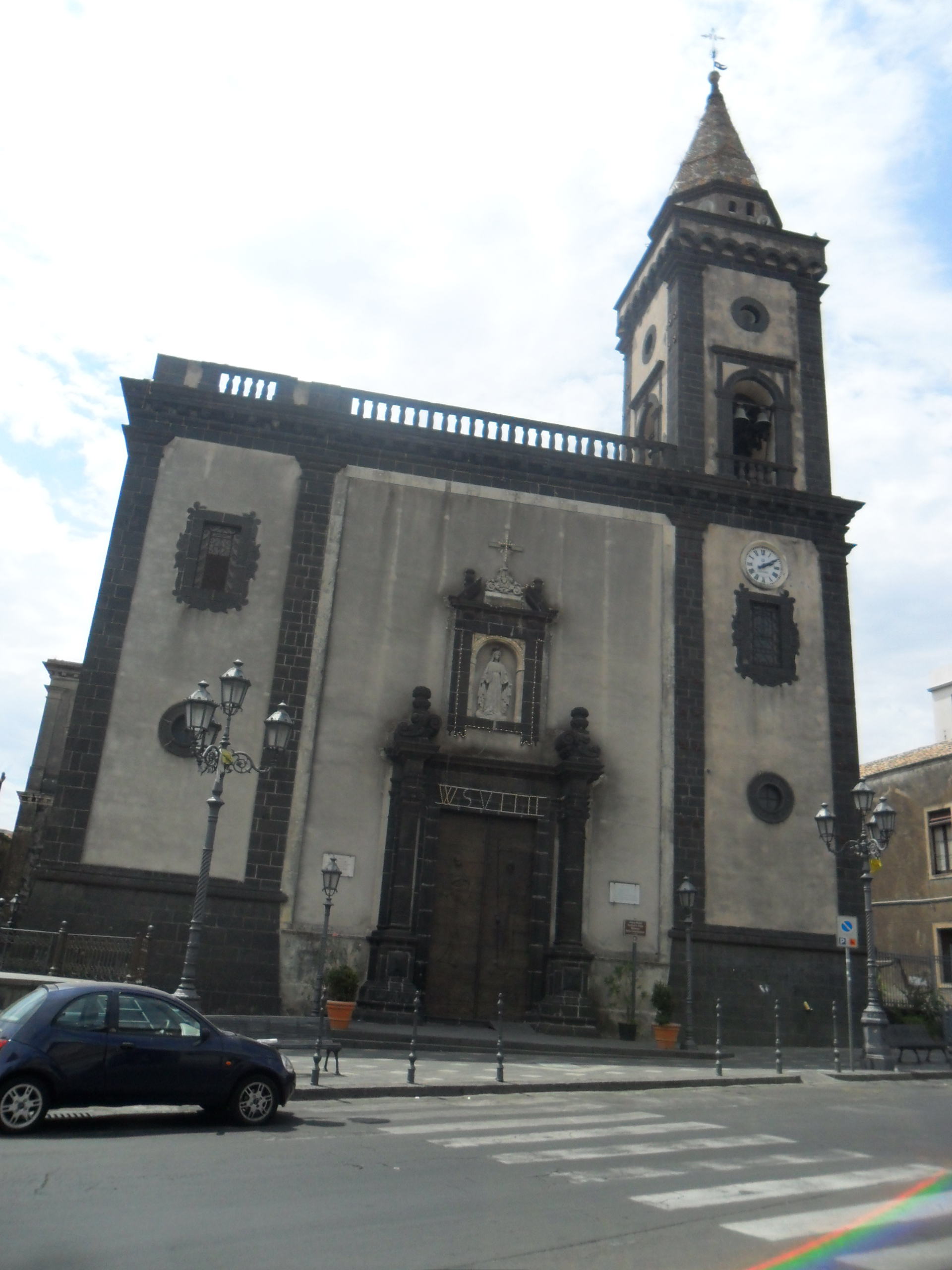

- Location within Italy Location within Calabria
- Coordinates: 39°7′20″N 16°57′30″E
- Country: Italy
- Region: Calabria
- Province: Crotone (KR)
- Frazioni: Corazzo

Government
  - Mayor: Antonio Barberio

Area
  - Total: 54.26 km^{2} (20.95 sq mi)
- Elevation: 350 m (1,150 ft)

Population (2018-01-01)
  - Total: 3,177
  - Density: 58.55/km^{2} (151.6/sq mi)
- Demonym: Scandalesi
- Time zone: UTC+1 (CET)
  - Summer (DST): UTC+2 (CEST)
- Postal code: 88831
- Dialing code: 0962
- Patron saint: Saint Nicholas of Myra
- Saint day: 6 December
- Website: Official website

Scandale is a town and comune in the province of Crotone, in the Calabria region of southern Italy.

== Geography ==
The town is bordered by Crotone, Cutro, Rocca di Neto, San Mauro Marchesato and Santa Severina.
