= Giovanni Battista Savelli =

Italian Roman Catholic cardinal

Giovanni Battista Savelli (1422 - 18 September 1498, Castel Gandolfo) was an Italian Roman Catholic cardinal. He was born into the aristocratic Savelli family, which had produced two popes: Honorius III (1216–1227) and Honorius IV (1285–1287) and numerous cardinals carrying this surname: Bertrando, Silvio, Giacomo, Giulio, Fabrizio, Paolo and Domenico Savelli.

== Early life and education ==
He was born in Rome. There is no data about his education. As a young man, he was appointed protonotary apostolic. He was named governor of Bologna during 1468 - 1470.

== Cardinalate ==
Savelli was created cardinal in pectore by Pope Paul II in May or June 1471; the nomination was kept secret because of the opposition of Cardinal Latino Orsini, and was thus not admitted to the Papal conclave, 1471. He was created cardinal deacon by Pope Sixtus IV in the consistory of 15 May 1480 and received the deaconry of Santi Vito e Modesto, Rome. He was appointed legate to Genoa to help negotiate a reconciliation between the feuding Fregoso and the Adorno families, and to supervise the arming of the papal fleet against the Ottoman Empire.

He developed a dispute with the Orsini Pope Sixtus IV, which led to being accused of treasonous correspondence with Alfonso of Naples, and imprisoned for 18 months in Castel Sant'Angelo together with Cardinal Giovanni Colonna. On 15 November 1483 he was liberated. He was granted the deaconry of San Nicola in Carcere on 17 March 1484. He participated in the Papal conclave, 1484. Pope Innocent VIII named him legate in Bologna in 1484. He took part in the conclave of 1492. Administrator of the see of Mallorca (27 March 1493 - 31 August 1492. Named Archpriest of the patriarchal Liberian Basilica from September 1492 until his death, on 18 September 1498, in his family's domain of Castel Gandolfo.

His body was transferred to Rome and buried in the church Santa Maria in Aracoeli. His tomb is attributed to the studio of the sculptor Andrea Bregno.
