= Pallagorio =

Pallagorio Greek: Palaiochorío
- Comune
- Comune di Pallagorio
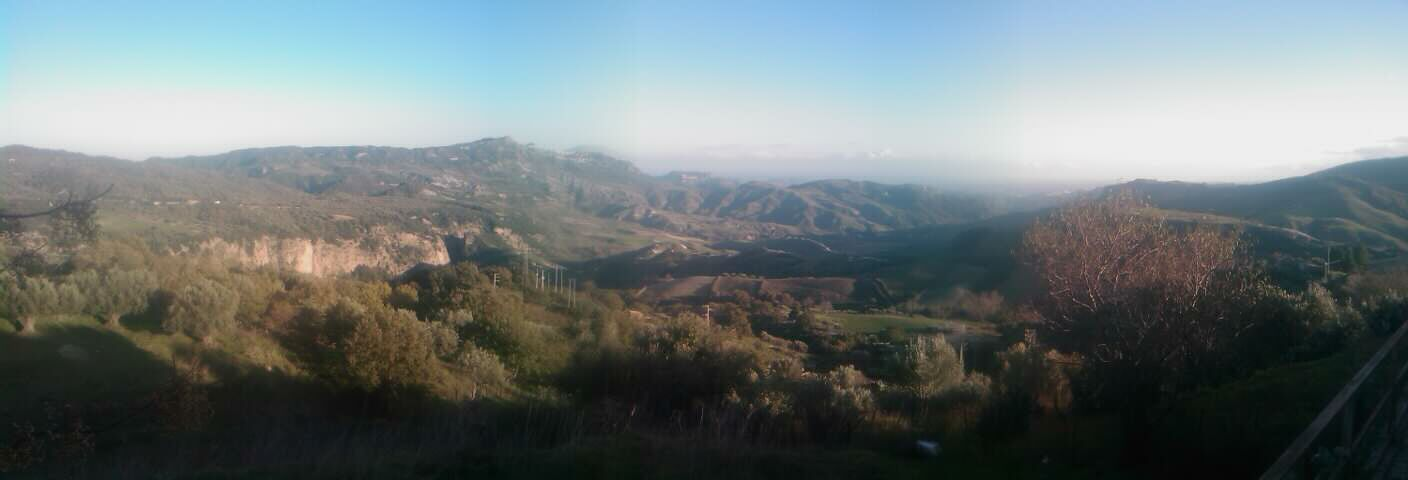

- Coat of arms

- Location within Italy Location within Calabria
- Coordinates: 39°18′N 16°54′E
- Country: Italy
- Region: Calabria
- Province: Crotone (KR)
- Frazioni: Trepido

Government
  - Mayor: Umberto Lorecchio

Area
  - Total: 41 km^{2} (16 sq mi)
- Elevation: 1 m (3.3 ft)

Population (31 December 2017)
  - Total: 1,164
  - Density: 28/km^{2} (74/sq mi)
- Demonym: Pallagoresi
- Time zone: UTC+1 (CET)
  - Summer (DST): UTC+2 (CEST)
- Postal code: 88818
- Dialing code: 0962
- Patron saint: Saint John the Baptist
- Website: Official website

Pallagorio (Albanian: Puhëriu, Calabrese: Paragùriu) is a comune and town in the province of Crotone, in Calabria, Italy.

== History ==
The village and the surrounding area have been inhabited since the Neolithic; there are numerous caves scattered in the territory, including the so-called "Cave of St. Maurice" of palaeontological interest.

In the second millennium BC, the area was settled by the Oenotrian-Italic population of the Chone, who left traces of their presence both in toponyms and with devotional objects found throughout the area. Archaeological remains from the early 1st millennium are found all over the area surrounding the town. It is speculated that the area was the seat of Chone, the city Italic-Hellenic founded in Mycenaean age by Greek hero Philoctetes, mentioned by historical sources (Strabo, Apollodorus, Lycophron). Archaeological finds include Italic-Hellenic walls, amphorae, tombs and the remains of an ancient necropolis with votive statues related to the Orphic cult.

Between the 7th and 5th century BC, Greek colonists arrived here, as testified by numerous remains and again by toponyms of Greek origin. In Roman times, Latin colonists settled in the area overlooking the village, along the river valley Vitravo, starting an intense colonisation of the land.

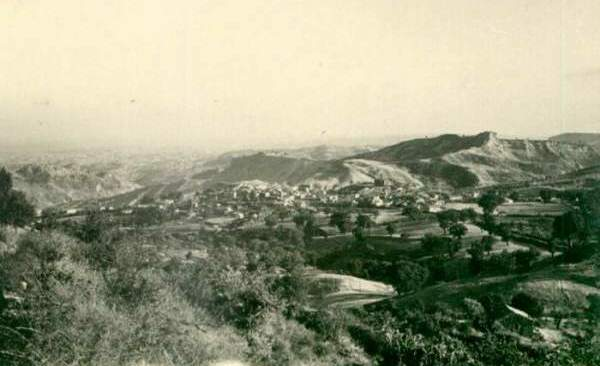
Pallagorio during the 1930s

In the Middle Ages, the village, concentrated in the districts of "Valle" and "Cucinaro", took the name of "San Giovanni in Palagorio". It had a few hundred inhabitants, mostly farmers, depending from the feudal lords of Umbriatico.

Around the mid-15th century, Albanian-Greek mercenaries from Epirus and Peloponnese under the guidance of Demetrio Reres settled the area after having fought in the war between the Angevins and Aragonese.

Since the end of the 17th century, the village was the subject of an intense and continuous migration of people attracted by the fertility of the land, and the mild climate. The village was a fief of the Spinelli finally until the end of the century, then it went to Rovegno, who held it to the end of the 18th century.

After the events of the Napoleonic Wars, it became an independent town in 1834. Next, it followed the fate of the Kingdom of Two Sicilies.

Until the mid-17th century, the village preserved the use of Byzantine Rite in addition to the Roman Rite.

The village still retains the Arbëreshë language, in addition to the Calabrian dialect.

== Etymology ==
Hypothesis on the origins of the name are various. One is that the current village is located near the ruins of a pre-existing fortress-town, whence the Greek name Palaios Chorion ("old settlement"). Others derive it from the Albanian name (Puheriu), from Puhe e ri ("New Puhe") referring to a possible settlement in Albania with the same name. The last one is still derived from the Arbereshe dialect: Pucciur e riut (Kissed from the wind), referring to the geographical position.

== Main sights ==
- Mother church, or church of St. John the Baptist (16th century)
- Church of Our Lady of Mount Carmel (early 20th century)
- Church of Saint Philomena, finished in 1859
- Church of Saint Anthony, located in Gradea neighborhood, residue of an old monastery
- Chapel of Saint Christopher
- Altar of the Madonna of the Stairs, in Grisuni
- Ancient Portal of the Piazza Rattazzi (Rattazi Square)

== Culture ==
Events in the village include:

- Feast of Our Lady of Mount Carmel (second Sunday of May)
- St. Lucy's Day
- Christmas, for which a special desserts are prepared: culumolli, a doughnut style pastry fried in oil; xhurxhullea, a type of Turrón made with sesame seeds and almonds worked with honey and covered in colored sugar ornaments; bukunotet, a kind of dumpling filled up with marmalade or ricotta cheese and covered with powder sugar; and krustullit, a type of big egg, milk, and flour gnocchis dipped in honey and must.

== Economy ==
Pallagorio relies on the production of oil, wine, cereals, citruses, and the intense breeding of cattle.

== People ==
- Anselmo Lorecchio (1843 - 1924), Italian lawyer, politician, poet, and writer, activist of Albanian National Awakening
- Ofelia Giudicissi Curci (1934 - 1981), poet, painter, and archeologist
