= Ofelia Giudicissi Curci =

Italian poet and archeologist (1934–1981)

Ofelia Giudicissi Curci (11 May 1934 – 13 September 1981) was an Italian poet, painter and archeologist. She was an advocate of the Albanian linguistic dialect Arbëresh, although her poetry was written in Italian. Momenti di un profilo meridionale, a collection of her poems, was published posthumously by her husband and son in 1996. Curci also worked in archeology, studying the region around Pallagorio.

== Life ==
Ofelia Giudicissi Curci was an Arbëresh from Pallagorio, a settlement near Crotone, in Calabria, southern Italy. She was born on 11 May 1934. Her father Carmine Giudicissi was a schoolteacher, and she was the seventh of ten children. Curci married Antonio Curci in 1959 and the couple had two sons.

Curci published her first poetry in a volume called Pallagorio (published by Arti Grafiche Pedanesi, Rome) in 1964. She wrote her poetry in Italian but was an advocate of the Arbëresh linguistic variety. She worked also in the field of archaeology, mostly on the terrain of her native area, and performed a research on the etymology of her town Pallagorio.

Curci died on 13 September 1981 in Rome, at the age of 47. Before she died, she had been working on a manuscript. Fifteen years after she died, her husband and sons published this collection of her poetry together with a photo album. In October 1996, Momenti di un profilo meridionale ("Moments of a southern profile") was published in Florence by publishing house "Parretti Grafiche". A literary prize was established in Curci's name in 2011. In 2021 her sons published her complete works under the title Ofelia, Poesie. Curci is buried in the cemetery at Pallagrio, with the poem Ballata di novembre engraved on her tomb.
