= Antonio Ammirati =

Italian politician (born 1980)

President of the Province of Crotone
- Incumbent
- Assumed office 2 April 2026
- Preceded by: Sergio Ferrari

Mayor of Cotronei
- Incumbent
- Assumed office 5 October 2021
- Preceded by: Nicola Belcastro

Personal details
- Born: 7 January 1980 (age 46) Crotone, Calabria, Italy
- Occupation: Lawyer

Antonio Ammirati (born 7 January 1980) is an Italian politician serving as president of the Province of Crotone since 2026. He has served as mayor of Cotronei since 2021.

In March 2026, Ammirati was elected president of the Province of Crotone as the candidate of a centre-right coalition supported by Forza Italia, Brothers of Italy and the civic lists. He defeated Umberto Lorecchio, the candidate of Us Moderates, with 52.98% of the weighted vote.
