= Antonello Savelli =

Antonello Savelli (c. 1450 – April 1498) was an Italian condottiero.

== Biography ==
A member of the Roman family of the Savelli, he was the son of Cristoforo Savelli and the uncle of Troilo.

As a young he fought in the inner disputes between the baronial households of the city. In 1482, together with the Colonna, he fought against Girolamo Riario, nephew of Pope Sixtus IV, who excommunicated Antonello.

His Lazio fiefs of Albano, Castel Savello, Castelgandolfo and Ariccia were besieged and captured by Paolo Orsini. Antonello replied by attacking the Orsini fief of Marino, but was defeated and wounded. The same feat repeated when he besieged Grottaferrata. He sued a peace with the Pope, but when the latter died in 1484 his support to the election of Innocent VIII granted him the role of Papal general in the war against the Kingdom of Naples. In 1491 he defeated the Baglioni at Corciano.

He supported King Charles VIII of France in his expedition to Italy, but later, when the French king returned northwards leaving him in the citadel of Naples, he ceded it without resistance to the King of Aragon.

He died in 1498 for a wound received in the baronial war against the Orsini.
