= Giulio Savelli (cardinal) =

Italian cardinal (1574–1644)

Giulio Savelli (Rome, 1574 – Rome, 9 July 1644) was an Italian clergyman, Archbishop of Salerno and Cardinal of the Roman Church.

== Biography ==
Giulio was born in Rome into the noble and ancient Savelli family in 1574. He was the son of Bernardino Savelli, Duke of Castel Gandolfo and Lucrezia dei Conti dell'Anguillara.

Giulio Savelli was governor of Orvieto in 1605 and from 21 February 1607 governor of Spoleto, then governor of Ancona from 1608 to 1610. In 1609 he became a student at the courts of the Apostolic Signatura. In 1614 he appeared as Extraordinary nuncio in Piedmont, where he mediated in a dispute between King Philip III of Spain and Charles Emmanuel I, Duke of Savoy.

Pope Paul V admitted him to the College of Cardinals as a cardinal priest in the consistory of 2 December 1615. He received the red hat three days later and Santa Sabina as a Titular church on 11 January 1616.

Giulio Savelli was also elected Bishop of Ancona e Numana on 11 January 1616. He was ordained Bishop on 10 April of the same year in the Roman church of Sant'Andrea in Montecavallo, the predecessor of Sant'Andrea al Quirinale, by Cardinal Scipione Borghese; co-consecrators were Archbishop Guido Bentivoglio, Apostolic Nuncio in France, and Antonio Grimani, Bishop of Torcello. On 2 December 1619, Giulio Savelli became Papal legate in Bologna and remained so until October 1621. He took part in the 1621 papal conclave that elected Pope Gregory XV. He gave up the Bishopric of Ancona before 2 March 1622. Giulio Savelli took part in the 1623 papal conclave that elected Urban VIII as Pope. From 7 January 1630 to 8 January 1631, he was Camerlengo of the Sacred College of Cardinals.

Following a nomination by King Philip IV of Spain, Giulio Savelli was appointed Archbishop of Salerno on 28 January 1630. On 10 November 1636, he moved to the titular church of Santa Maria in Trastevere. On 28 March 1639, he was promoted to Cardinal Bishop and the Suburbicarian Diocese of Frascati. He gave up the archbishopric of Salerno before 15 September 1642.

Giulio Savelli died in Rome and was buried in the family tomb in the church of Santa Maria in Ara Coeli.

== Sources ==
- Giampiero Brunelli: Savelli, Giulio. In: Raffaele Romanelli: Treccani, Dizionario Biografico degli Italiani (DBI). Band 90: Salvestrini–Saviozzo da Siena. Istituto della Enciclopedia Italiana, Rome 2017.
- Savelli, Giulio. In: Salvador Miranda: The Cardinals of the Holy Roman Church. (Website of Florida International University)
- Entry for Giulio Savelli on catholic-hierarchy.org

Catholic Church titles
Preceded by Carlo Conti	Bishop of Ancona e Numana; 1616–1622	Succeeded by Luigi Galli
Preceded by Gabriel Trejo Paniagua	Archbishop of Salerno; 1630–1642	Succeeded by Fabrizio Savelli
Preceded by Marcello Lante della Rovere	Cardinal-Bishop of Frascati; 1639–1644	Succeeded by Giulio Roma
