= Province of Crotone =

Province of Italy

Coordinates: 39°5′N 17°7′E

Province of Crotone Provincia di Crotone (Italian)
- Province
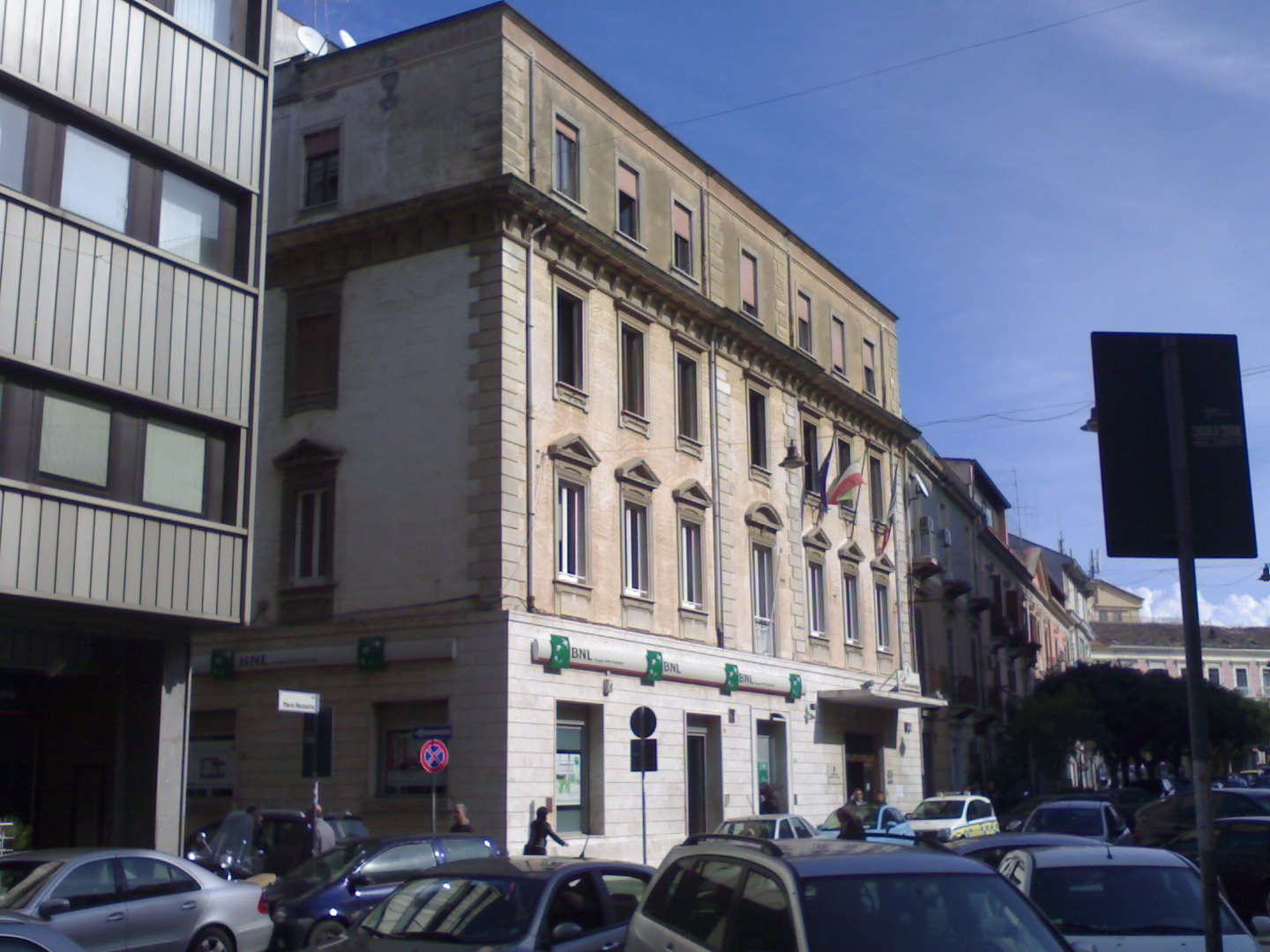
- The provincial seat

- Flag Coat of arms

- Location of the province of Crotone in Italy
- Country: Italy
- Region: Calabria
- Capital(s): Crotone
- Municipalities: 27

Government
  - President: Antonio Ammirati

Area
  - Total: 1,735.68 km^{2} (670.15 sq mi)

Population (2026)
  - Total: 161,765
  - Density: 93.1998/km^{2} (241.386/sq mi)

GDP
  - Total: €2.733 billion (2015)
  - Per capita: €15,660 (2015)
- Time zone: UTC+1 (CET)
  - Summer (DST): UTC+2 (CEST)
- Postal code: 88900; 888xx
- Telephone prefix: 0962, 0984
- Vehicle registration: KR
- ISTAT code: 101
- Website: Official website

The province of Crotone (Italian: provincia di Crotone) is a province in the region of Calabria in southern Italy. It was formed in 1992 out of a section of the province of Catanzaro. The capital is the city of Crotone.

It borders the provinces of Cosenza, Catanzaro, and also the Ionian Sea. It contains the mountain Pizzuta, the National Park of the Sila, Montagnella Park, and the Giglietto Valley.

It has a population of 161,765 in an area of 1,735.68 square kilometres (670.15 sq mi) across its 27 municipalities.

== History ==
The area around Capo Colonna, the easternmost point of the province, revealed numerous archaeological remains of Stone Age settlements, with large quantities of Neolithic pottery being found. The Greeks settled on the coasts of Calabria during the 8th and 7th centuries BC, and the city of Crotone was founded, under the name of Kroton, by Greek Achaeans in around 710 BC. It grew to become a town of 50,000 to 80,000 inhabitants around 500 BC. The wrestler Milo of Croton was born in Crotone during the sixth century BC and the town had a great reputation for prowess in athletics having produced many Olympic champions. Pythagoras moved to Croton in around 530 BC, and a medical school was also based in the region at around this time. It flourished as an important port and conquered the city Sybaris under the command of Milo. Pyrrhus of Epirus then controlled the city until it fell under Roman Republic rule. The city Crotone participated in the Second Punic War, in which, it rebelled and fought against its Roman Republic rulers.

The province of Crotone was formed in 1992 from land that had previously been part of the province of Catanzaro.

== Geography ==
The province of Crotone is one of the five provinces in the region of Calabria in southern Italy. To the northwest lies the Province of Cosenza and to the southwest lies the Province of Catanzaro. To the south and east, the province has a coastline on the Gulf of Taranto, part of the Mediterranean Sea.

The northwesterly part of Crotone forms part of the high plateau of La Sila and includes part of the Sila National Park, a rugged wilderness area which has open heathland, and forests of pine, oak, beech and fir. In the upland areas chestnuts and olives are grown, and most of the province is a lowland agricultural area with orchards of citrus fruits and vineyards. The rivers are short and many dry up in summer.

== Government ==
=== Municipalities ===
The province has 27 municipalities:

- Belvedere di Spinello
- Caccuri
- Carfizzi
- Casabona
- Castelsilano
- Cerenzia
- Cirò
- Cirò Marina
- Cotronei
- Crotone
- Crucoli
- Cutro
- Isola di Capo Rizzuto
- Melissa
- Mesoraca
- Pallagorio
- Petilia Policastro
- Rocca di Neto
- Roccabernarda
- San Mauro Marchesato
- San Nicola dell'Alto
- Santa Severina
- Savelli
- Scandale
- Strongoli
- Umbriatico
- Verzino

== Demographics ==
As of 2026, the population is 161,765, of which 49.8% are male, and 50.2% are female. Minors make up 16.5% of the population, and seniors make up 23.4%.

Historical population

Year	Pop.	±%
1861	52,021	—
1871	55,374	+6.4%
1881	64,260	+16.0%
1901	75,325	+17.2%
1911	79,657	+5.8%
1921	83,786	+5.2%
1931	97,956	+16.9%
1936	105,680	+7.9%

Year	Pop.	±%
1951	142,735	+35.1%
1961	167,111	+17.1%
1971	172,798	+3.4%
1981	186,671	+8.0%
1991	180,409	−3.4%
2001	173,122	−4.0%
2011	170,803	−1.3%
2021	163,553	−4.2%

Source: ISTAT

=== Immigration ===
As of 2025, immigrants make up 7.6% of the population. The 5 largest foreign countries of birth are Romania, Germany, Morocco, Ukraine, and Bangladesh.

== Sights ==
Crotone has a long history and many interesting features. The cathedral originates from the 9th to 11th centuries AD but has seen many changes to its architecture over the years. The 16th century castle of Charles V houses the local museum, but an older castle is located on an island just offshore and can only be approached by foot. Near the town are the remains of the Greek temple of Hera Lacinia, at one time the most important temple in Magna Graecia.

The historic town of Santa Severina dates back to the ninth century BC when the Enotri, an ancient Italian tribe, inhabited the region. It later became an important Byzantine trading centre. It is built on the top of a steep-sided hill with the castle on the summit. The castle is one of the best-preserved Norman structures in the region and now houses the Archaeological Museum of Castles and Fortifications in Calabria. In the main square stands the Cathedral of Saint Anastasia, which dates back to 1274, and nearby is the Baptistry, a fine example of Byzantine architecture from the seventh to ninth centuries, and probably the oldest such structure in Calabria. On the other side of the castle stands the eleventh century Church of Santo Filomena, another fine Byzantine edifice.

Pallagorio is another ancient town. The "Cave of St. Maurice" was occupied in Neolithic times, Greek colonists settled here in around the seventh century BC, and Roman colonists did likewise several centuries later, and traces of their villas remain near the river. In medieval times, the village situated here came to be known as "San Giovanni in Palagorio". It now has many interesting churches and chapels.

Umbriatico was founded by the Oenotrians before Greek colonists arrived in this district and founded nearby Kroton. It is situated on a rocky hill and accessible via a bridge over the river. During the Second Punic War it had a defensive wall, but this did not prevent the Romans from storming it and massacring the citizens. The Cathedral of San Donato has a crypt which was originally a Greek temple, with Doric columns.
