= Luca Savelli =

Ancient Roman senator

Luca Savelli was a Roman senator who in 1234 sacked the Lateran in a revolt against Pope Gregory IX. He was the father of Pope Honorius IV.

== Life ==
Savelli was born in about 1190, into an old senatorial family; and married Vana Aldobrandeschi.

Savelli became Senator of the Roman Commune and attempted to extend Roman control over Tuscia and the province of Marittima e Campagna, the later part of the Patrimony of Saint Peter. The Roman militia seized and occupied the castle of Montalto di Castro - directly subject to the Church of Rome - to make it a stronghold in the military maneuvers against Viterbo. Gregory took refuge in Rieti and in May 1234 excommunicated Savelli and a number of his supporters and organized a counter-offensive. Much to the surprise of the Romans, Frederick II, Holy Roman Emperor, who was frequently at war with the papacy, sided with the Pope this time.

Frederick II moved from southern Italy with an army, joining the papal troops under Raniero Capocci at Montefiascone. On October 8, the Romans attacked Viterbo, but were beaten back. The defender's then besieged the Romans at a fortress a few kilometers south of Viterbo and Capocci was able to defeat them. Savelli responded by banishing Cardinal Capocci from Rome and declaring the Pope exiled until he should pay compensation for war damages. To this end, he began requisitioning assets from the dioceses of Ostia, Tusculum and Palestrina and other religious institutes of the Patrimony. In April 1235, Savelli was replaced as Senator.

Savelli was again Senator in May 1266. He died in office that year, still attempting to extend Roman authority and recover war damages from the Curia. His tomb is found at the Santa Maria in Aracoeli "Our Lady of The Heavenly Altar", along with his wife, and his son Giacomo (Honorius IV). The papal tomb was actually designed for Luca's wife Vana. Another son, Pandolfo, was the podestà of Viterbo (1275).
