= Verzino =

- Comune
- Comune di Verzino
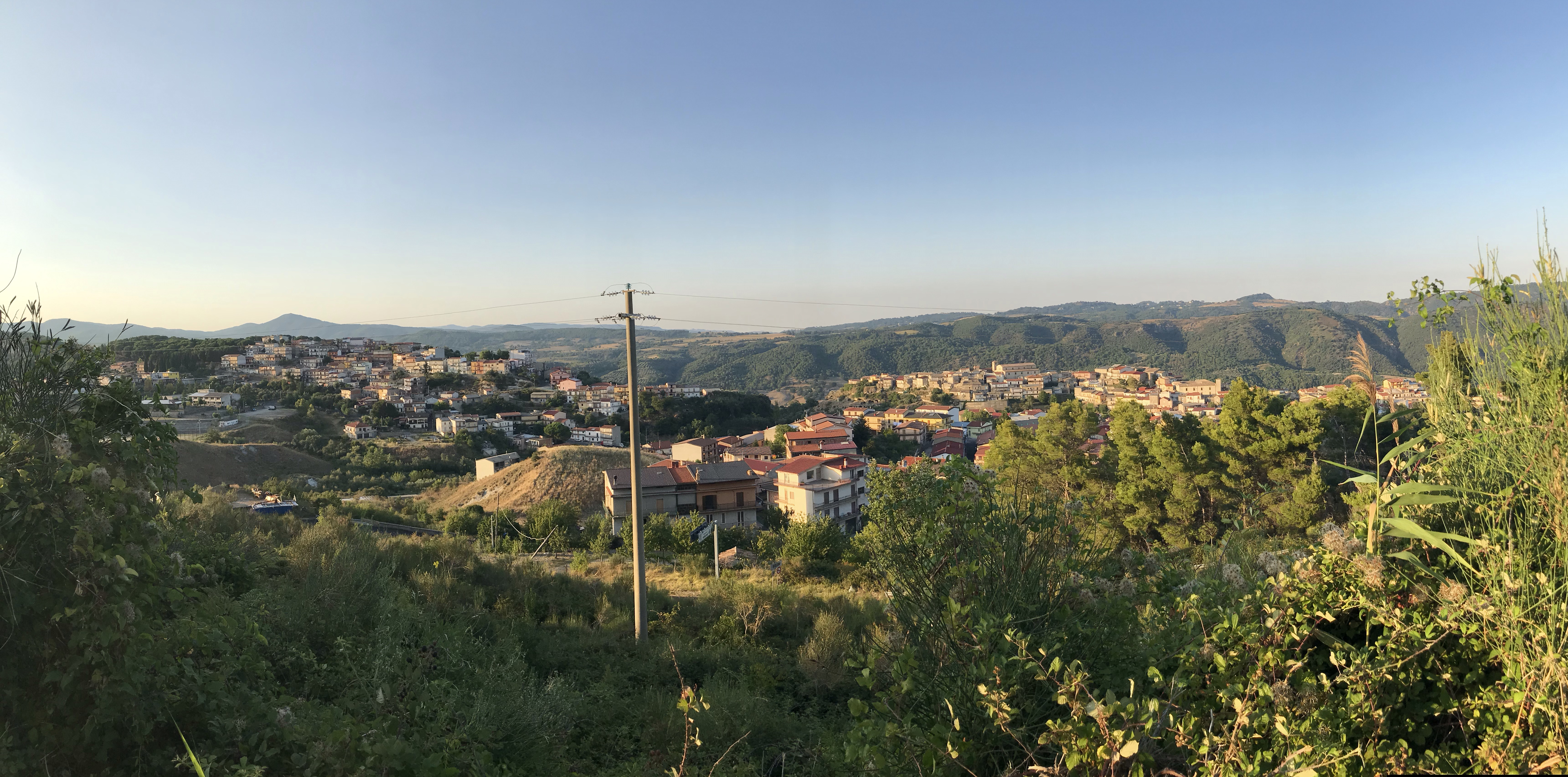

- Coat of arms

- Location within Italy Location within Calabria
- Coordinates: 39°19′N 16°52′E
- Country: Italy
- Region: Calabria
- Province: Crotone (KR)
- Frazioni: Vigne

Government
  - Mayor: Giuseppe Antonio Cozza

Area
  - Total: 45 km^{2} (17 sq mi)
- Elevation: 550 m (1,800 ft)

Population (December 31, 2004)
  - Total: 2,373
  - Density: 53/km^{2} (140/sq mi)
- Demonym: Verzinesi
- Time zone: UTC+1 (CET)
  - Summer (DST): UTC+2 (CEST)
- Postal code: 88819
- Dialing code: 0962
- Patron saint: St. Blaise
- Website: Official website

Verzino (Calabrian: Virzìnu) is a comune and town in the province of Crotone, in Calabria, southern Italy. Its manufactures include oil, wine, cereals, citruses, and cattle breeding.
