= Cotronei =

Cotronei Greek: Kutrunéi
- Comune
- Comune di Cotronei
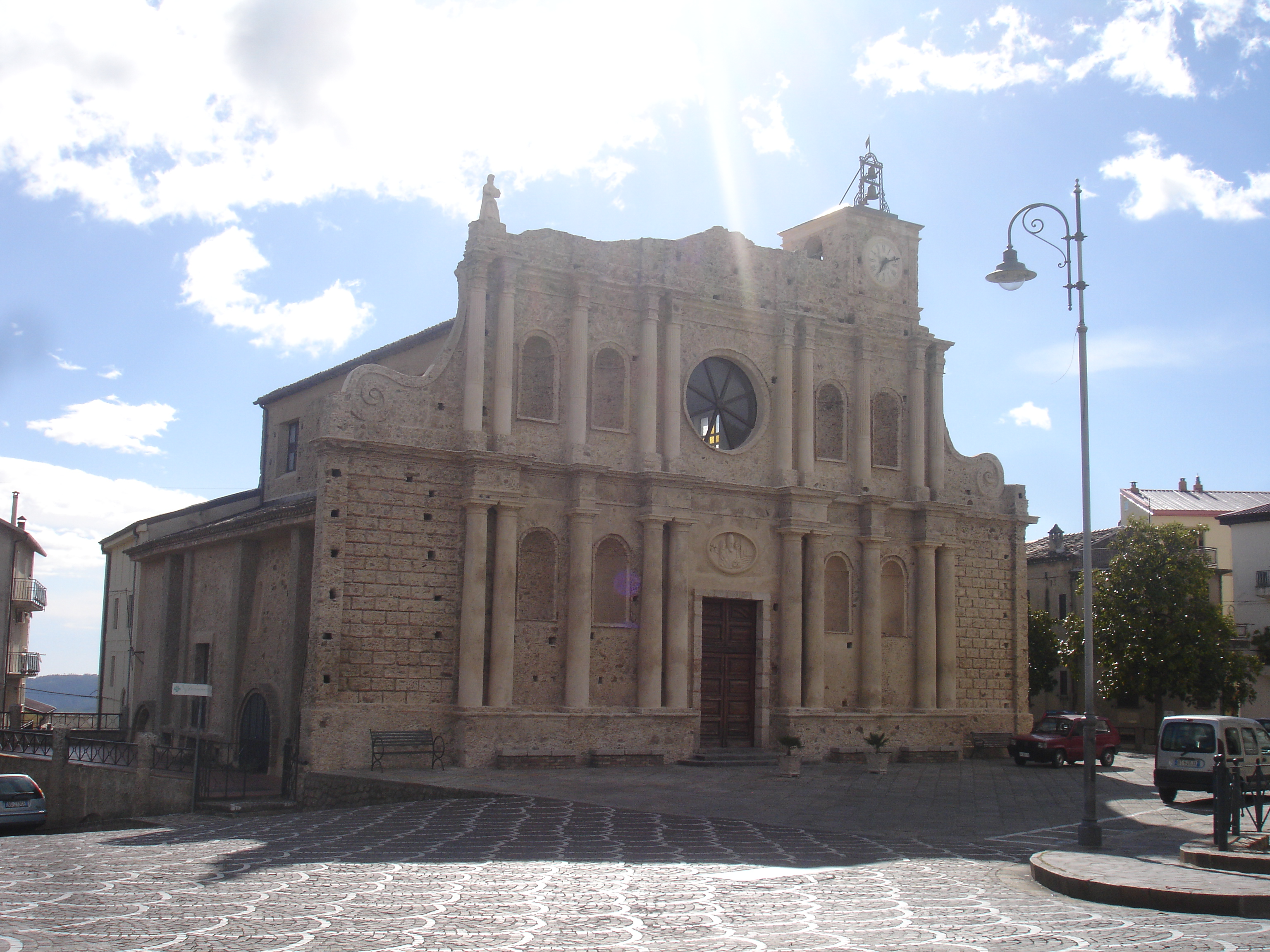
- Church of San Nicola

- Location within Italy Location within Calabria
- Coordinates: 39°09′40″N 16°46′40″E
- Country: Italy
- Region: Calabria
- Province: Crotone (KR)
- Frazioni: Trepido

Government
  - Mayor: Antonio Ammirati

Area
  - Total: 78 km^{2} (30 sq mi)
- Elevation: 1 m (3.3 ft)

Population (30 November 2012)
  - Total: 5,428
  - Density: 70/km^{2} (180/sq mi)
- Demonym: Cotronellari
- Time zone: UTC+1 (CET)
  - Summer (DST): UTC+2 (CEST)
- Postal code: 88836
- Dialing code: 0962

Cotronei (Cotronellaro: Cutrunii) is a comune and town in the province of Crotone, in Calabria, southern Italy. It is the home town of Giovanni Tallarico, grandfather of Aerosmith singer Steven Tyler.

The economy of Cotronei relies on the production of oil, wine, cereals, citruses, and the intense breeding of cattle.

== History and Culture ==
Cotronei is the ancestral home of Giovanni Tallarico, the paternal grandfather of Aerosmith lead singer Steven Tyler. Tyler's family roots were featured on the genealogy series Who Do You Think You Are? and he was named an honorary citizen of the town during a historic visit in 2013.
