= Carfizzi =

- Comune
- Comune di Carfizzi
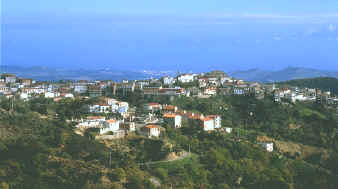

- Location within Italy Location within Calabria
- Coordinates: 39°18′N 16°58′E
- Country: Italy
- Region: Calabria
- Province: Crotone (KR)

Government
  - Mayor: Mario Antonio Amato

Area
  - Total: 20 km^{2} (7.7 sq mi)

Population (May. 2011)
  - Total: 769
  - Density: 38/km^{2} (100/sq mi)
- Time zone: UTC+1 (CET)
  - Summer (DST): UTC+2 (CEST)
- Postal code: 88817
- Dialing code: 0962
- Website: Official website

Carfizzi (Arbëreshë Albanian: Karfici) is an Arbëreshë comune in the Province of Crotone, Calabria, Italy.
