= Pandolfo Savelli =

Italian aristocrat

Pandolfo Savelli (died 1306) was a member of the Savelli family, a son of Luca Savelli and brother of Pope Honorius IV. He held the office of podestà of Viterbo in 1275 and was on several occasions a Roman senator. In 1297 he strove in vain to mediate peace between Pope Boniface VIII and the Colonna.
