= Crucoli =

- Comune
- Comune di Crucoli
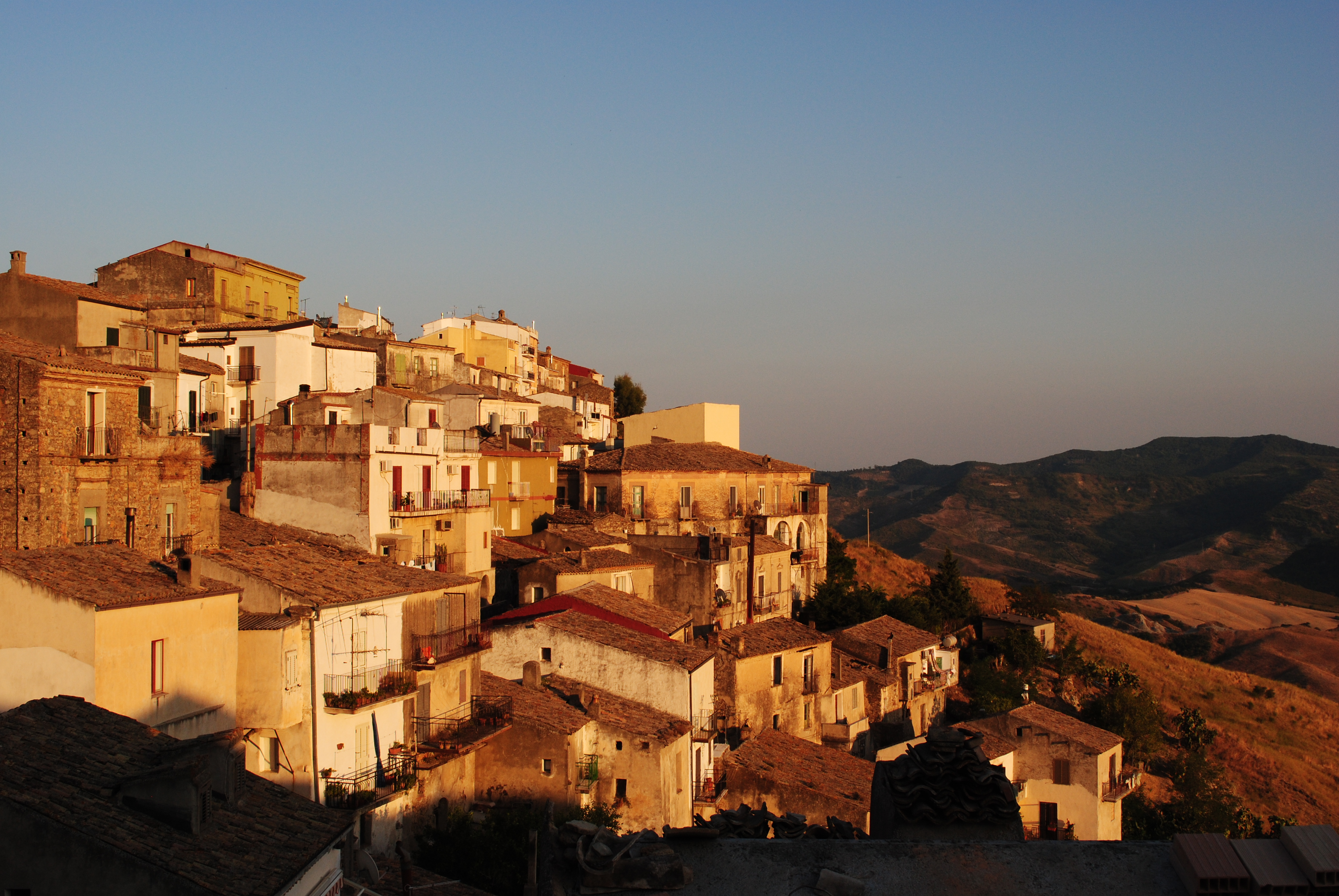

- Location within Italy Location within Calabria
- Coordinates: 39°25′30″N 17°00′15″E
- Country: Italy
- Region: Calabria
- Province: Crotone (KR)
- Frazioni: Torretta

Government
  - Mayor: Cataldo Librandi

Area
  - Total: 50.54 km^{2} (19.51 sq mi)
- Elevation: 1 m (3.3 ft)

Population (23 May 2024)
  - Total: 2,753
  - Density: 54.47/km^{2} (141.1/sq mi)
- Demonym: Crucolesi
- Time zone: UTC+1 (CET)
  - Summer (DST): UTC+2 (CEST)
- Postal code: 88812
- Dialing code: 0962
- Website: Official website

Crucoli is a comune and town in the province of Crotone, in Calabria, southern Italy.

== Economy ==
Crucoli relies on the production of oil, wine, cereals, citruses, and cattle animal husbandry.
