= Savelli family =

Former Italian aristocratic family

- Country: Papal States
- Founded: 11th century
- Titles: Prince of Albano Laziale; Prince of Savelli; Prince of Cerenzia; Duke of Castel Gandolfo; Lord of Palombara Sabina; Lord of Ariccia; Lord of Rignano Flaminio; Lord of Albano Laziale
- Dissolution: 1712

The House of Savelli (de Sabellis in documents) were a rich and influential Roman aristocratic family who rose to prominence in the 13th century. The family included several popes, senators and condottieri. They dominated the city in rivalry with the first generation of great Roman families, the Colonna, the Orsini, the Caetani and the Annibaldi, later being overshadowed by the emergence of the second generation represented by the Chigi, Borghese, Barberini, Doria Pamphili and Sforza Cesarini families.

== History ==
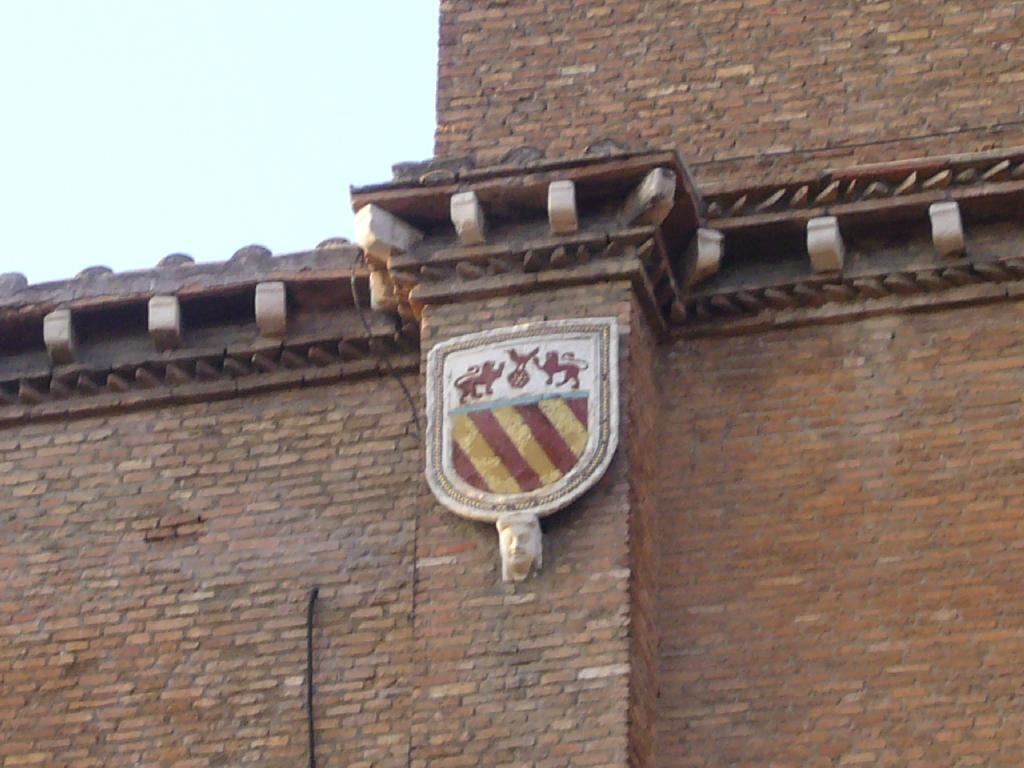
The Coat of Arms of the Savelli over a wall of the church of Santa Maria in Aracoeli, Rome.

The family, who held the lordship of Palombara Sabina, took their name from the rocca (castle) of Sabellum, near Albano, which had belonged to the counts of Tusculum before it passed to the Savelli. Early modern genealogies of the Savelli, such as the unpublished manuscript "eulogistic treatise" compiled by Onofrio Panvinio, drew connections to Pope Benedict II, a possible but undocumentable connection, and even to the cognomen Sabellius of Antiquity.

They provided at least two popes: Cencio Savelli, Pope Honorius III (1216–1227) and Giacomo Savelli, Honorius IV (1285–1287). His father, Luca Savelli, was a Roman senator and sacked the Lateran in 1234. Luca's decision to side with Emperor Frederick II against Honorius III's successor, Gregory, brought various material benefits to the family, including some fiefs in the Sabina region. Honorius' brother, Pandolfo Savelli, was the podestà of Viterbo in 1275.

Later members include the condottieri Silvio and Antonello Savelli. Savelli Cardinals include Giovanni Battista Savelli (1471 in pectore, 1480); Giacomo Savelli (1539); Silvio Savelli (1596); Giulio Savelli (1615); Fabrizio Savelli (1647); Paolo Savelli (1664); and Domenico Savelli (1853). The last member of the family left in Rome was Giulio Savelli, who died in 1712.

By the 17th century, the Savelli had fallen on lean times. Castel Gandolfo had been relinquished under terms of Pope Clement VIII's "bull of the barons" to the Papal treasury in return for a mere 150,000 scudi in 1596, and in 1650 Albano, with its princely title, was turned over to the Savalli family.

A collateral branch, the Giannuzzi Savelli ('Giannuzzi' adopted later on) represents descendants of Antonio Savelli of Rignano who moved to the Kingdom of Naples in 1421 to fight as a condottiero. This branch, in turn, is divided into two lines. The first line inherited the title of Prince of Cerenzia (principe di Cerenzia) in 1769 from Ippolita Rota, the mother of Ercole Giannuzzi Savelli of the barons of Pietramala who was last of her house. Members of this line included the republican patriot Luigi Giannuzzi Savelli of the Princes of Cerenzia who was shot 3 April 1799 by orders of Cardinal Ruffo. During the 20th century, this line of the Princes of Cerenzia extinguished in the House of Paternò who assumed its titles. The second line, of the Barons of Pietramala and Patricians of Cosenza is still flourishing today.

== Popes ==
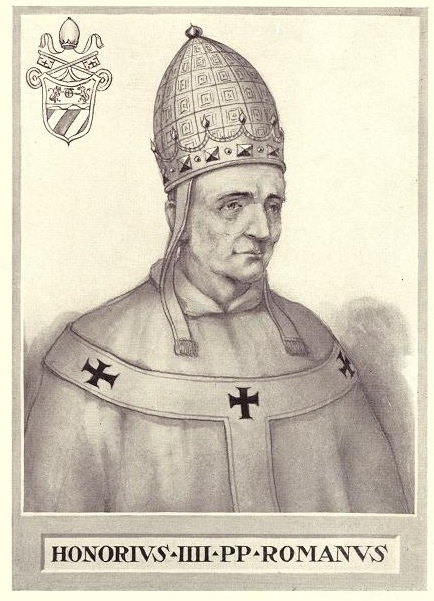
Giacomo Savelli (c1210-87), who reigned as Pope Honorius IV from 1285 to 1287.

In brackets the year of the beginning and end of his pontificate:

- Pope Benedict II (684-685)
- Pope Gregory II (715-731)
- Pope Eugene II (824-827)
- Pope Honorius III (1216–1227)
- Pope Honorius IV (1285–1287)

== Cardinals ==
In parentheses the year of nomination as a cardinal:

- Licinio Savelli (o Sabelli) (c. 1075–first part of 1088)
- Bertrando Savelli (1216)
- Giovanni Battista Savelli (1480)
- Silvio Savelli (1596)
- Giulio Savelli (1615)
- Fabrizio Savelli (1647)
- Paolo Savelli (1664)
- Domenico Savelli (1853)

== Military leaders and military men ==
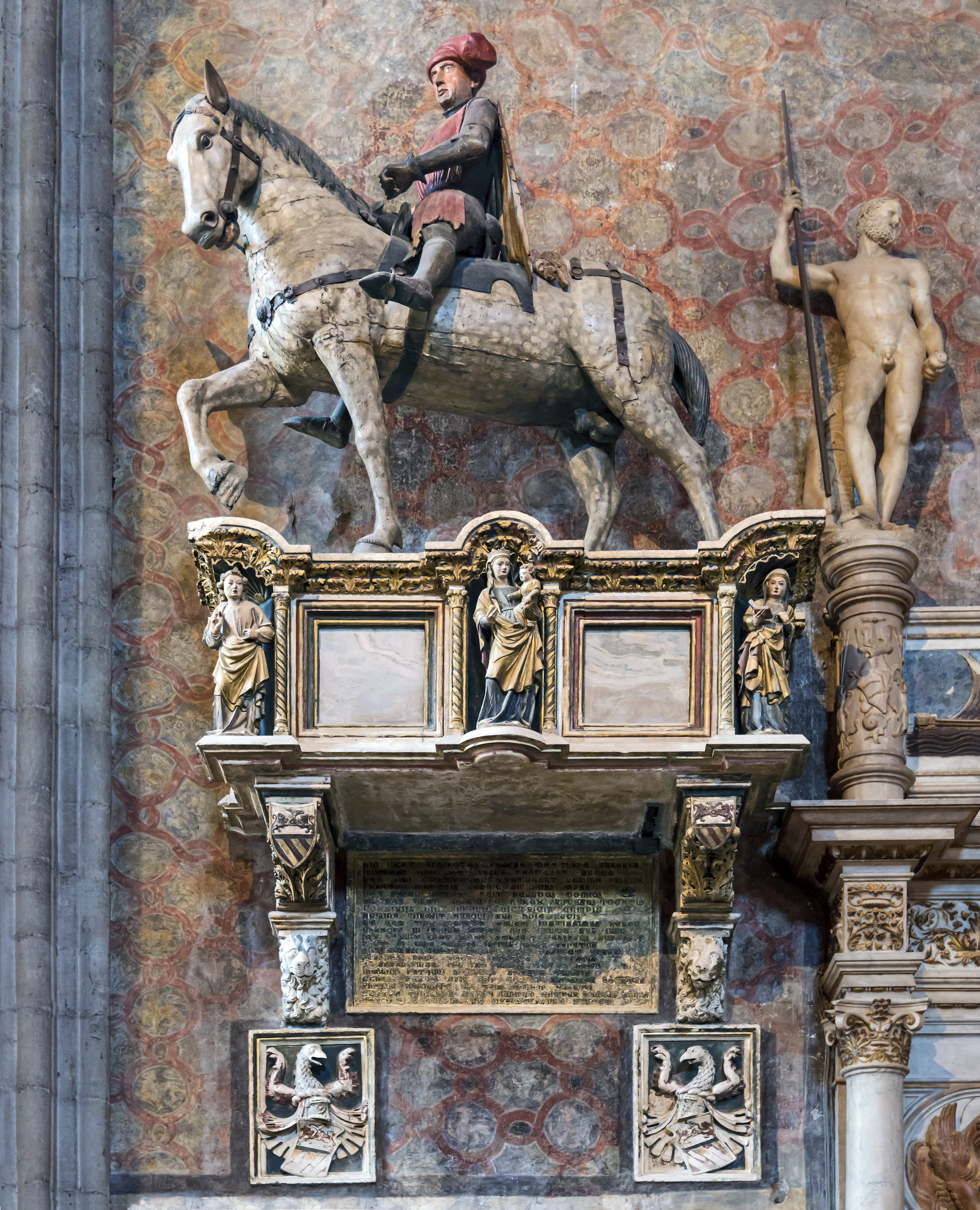
Monument to Paolo Savelli (1350–1405) Basilica di Santa Maria Gloriosa dei Frari

- Jacopo Savelli (...–1355) di parte guelfa
- Luca Savelli (...–1390) di parte guelfa
- Paolo Savelli (1350–1405)
- Evangelista Savelli (...–1462)
- Antonello Savelli (1450–1498)
- Giovanni Savelli (...–1498)
- Cristorforo Savelli (...–1500)
- Ludovico Savelli (...–1500)
- Onorio Savelli (...–1500)
- Troiano Savelli (...–1510)
- Mariano Savelli (...–1515)
- Paolo Savelli (...–1515)
- Battista Savelli (...–1513)
- Silvio Savelli (...–1515)
- Luca Savelli (...–1515)
- Antonio Savelli (...–1522)
- Jacopo Savelli (...–1525)
- Giovan Battista Savelli (1505–1551)
- Davide Savelli (...–1522)

== Senators of Rome ==
- Luca Savelli (1266) e (1290), grandson of Cenci, later Pope Honorius III
- Pandolfo Savelli (1287), brother of Giacomo, later Pope Honorius IV
