= Mesoraca =

Mesoraca Mesoráchion Misuraca
- Comune
- Comune di Mesoraca
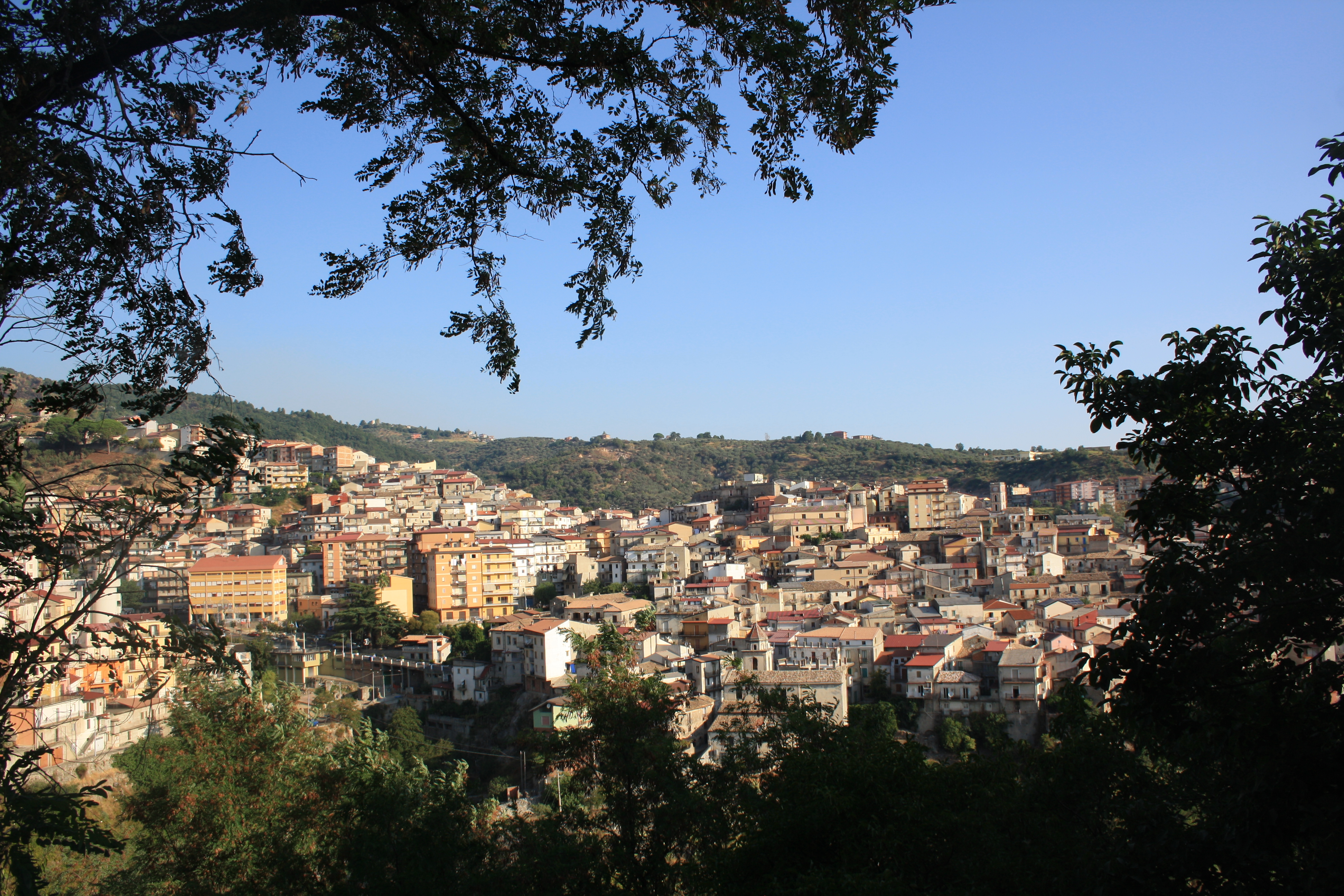
- View of Mesoraca

- Location within Italy Location within Calabria
- Coordinates: 39°04′55″N 16°47′15″E
- Country: Italy
- Region: Calabria
- Province: Crotone (KR)
- Frazioni: Filippa

Government
  - Mayor: Annibale Parise (since 2019)

Area
  - Total: 94.79 km^{2} (36.60 sq mi)
- Elevation: 1 m (3.3 ft)

Population (20 May 2024)
  - Total: 5,740
  - Density: 60.6/km^{2} (157/sq mi)
- Demonym: Mesorachesi
- Time zone: UTC+1 (CET)
  - Summer (DST): UTC+2 (CEST)
- Postal code: 88838
- Dialing code: 0962
- Website: Official website

Mesoraca (Sicilian: Misuraca) is a comune and town in the province of Crotone, in Calabria, southern Italy.

== Economy ==
Mesoraca relies on the production of oil, wine, cereals, citruses, and intensive cattle rearing.

== Twin towns ==
Mesoraca is twinned with:

- Lavena Ponte Tresa, Italy
