= Roccabernarda =

- Comune
- Comune di Roccabernarda
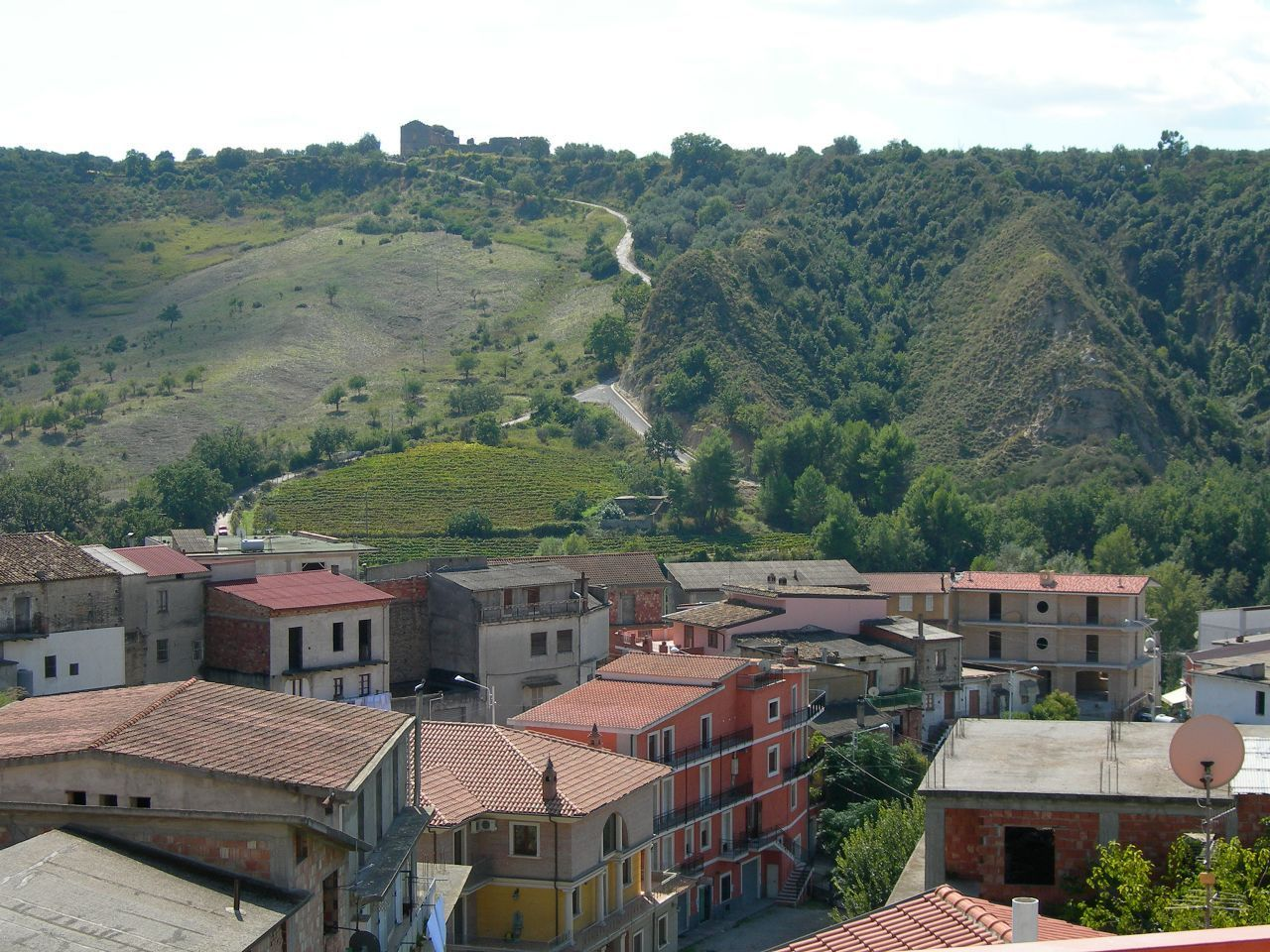

- Location within Italy Location within Calabria
- Coordinates: 39°8′N 16°52′E
- Country: Italy
- Region: Calabria
- Province: Crotone (KR)

Area
  - Total: 65 km^{2} (25 sq mi)

Population (2018-01-01)
  - Total: 3,385
  - Density: 52/km^{2} (130/sq mi)
- Demonym: Rocchisani
- Time zone: UTC+1 (CET)
  - Summer (DST): UTC+2 (CEST)
- Postal code: 88835
- Dialing code: 0962
- Patron saint: San Francesco di Paola
- Saint day: Last Sunday in May

Roccabernada is a town and comune of the province of Crotone in the Calabria region of southern Italy.

== History ==
The origins of the settlement may date back to an ancient Greek settlement in the area. Initially known as Re Pagano, the site later became the location of a fortified castle, known as Rocca Bernarda.
