= San Nicola dell'Alto =

San Nicola dell'Alto Shën Koll
- Comune
- Comune di San Nicola dell'Alto
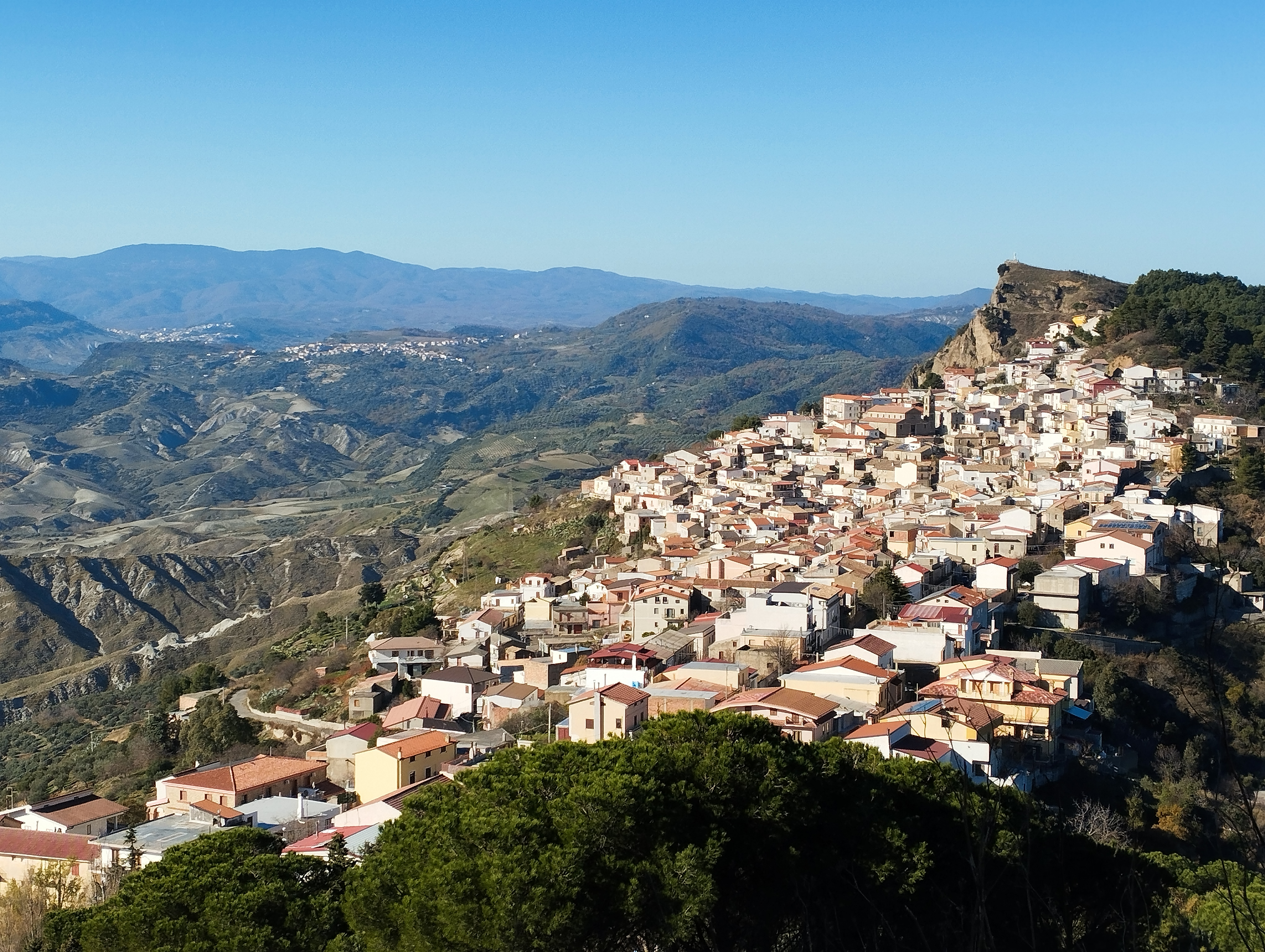

- Coat of arms

- Location within Italy Location within Calabria
- Coordinates: 39°18′N 16°58′E
- Country: Italy
- Region: Calabria
- Province: Crotone (KR)

Government
  - Mayor: Luigi Rizzuti

Area
  - Total: 7.8 km^{2} (3.0 sq mi)

Population (2018-01-01)
  - Total: 1,105
  - Density: 140/km^{2} (370/sq mi)
- Demonym: Sannicolesi
- Time zone: UTC+1 (CET)
  - Summer (DST): UTC+2 (CEST)
- Postal code: 88817
- Dialing code: 0962
- Patron saint: St. Michael
- Website: sannicoladellalto.asmenet.it

San Nicola dell'Alto (Arbëreshë Albanian: Shën Koll) is a village and comune (municipality) in the province of Crotone, in the Calabria region of southern Italy. It is an Arbëreshë village founded by Albanian immigrants to Italy in the sixteenth century.
