= Cutro =

Cutro Kytèrion (Greek)
- Comune
- Comune di Cutro
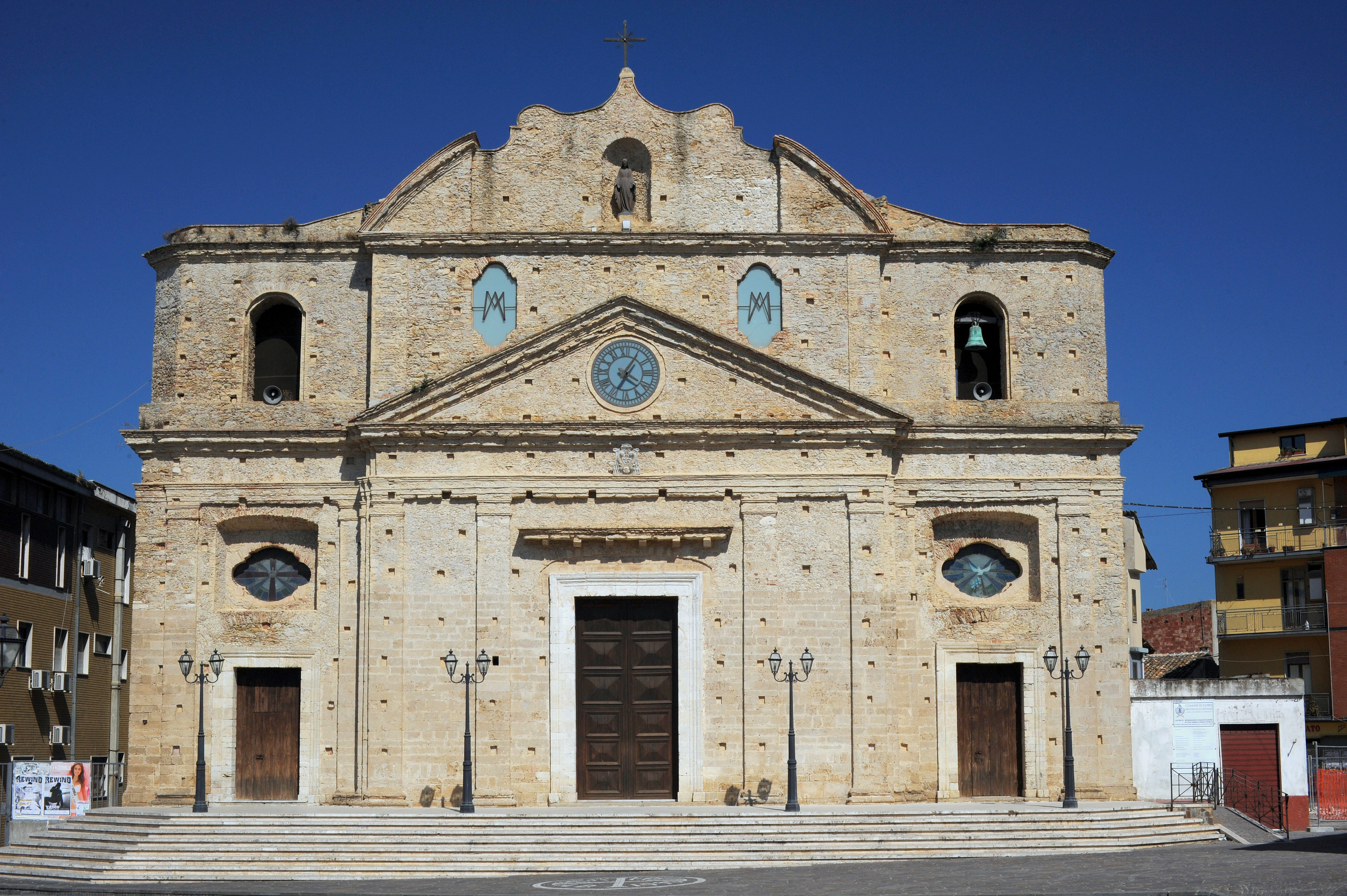
- The Chiesa Madre of Cutro

- Coat of arms

- Location within Italy Location within Calabria
- Coordinates: 39°01′58″N 16°58′57″E
- Country: Italy
- Region: Calabria
- Province: Crotone (KR)
- Frazioni: San Leonardo, Steccato

Government
  - Mayor: Salvatore Di Vuono

Area
  - Total: 131 km^{2} (51 sq mi)
- Elevation: 226 m (741 ft)

Population (December 31, 2004)
  - Total: 10,474
  - Density: 80.0/km^{2} (207/sq mi)
- Demonym: Cutresi
- Time zone: UTC+1 (CET)
  - Summer (DST): UTC+2 (CEST)
- Postal code: 88842
- Dialing code: 0962
- Patron saint: SS. Crucifix
- Saint day: May 3
- Website: Official website

Cutro (Calabrian: Cùtru; Greek: Kytèrion) is a town and comune in the province of Crotone, Calabria region, Italy. It holds the name "City of chess".

It is also the birthplace of Vincenzo Iaquinta, a World Cup-winning footballer who played for Serie A club Juventus.

== History ==
Cutro was a Greek colony of Magna Graecia, with the name of Kyterion.

It obtained the title of city in 1575 by the Spanish King Philip II, after the local chess champion Giò Leonardo Di Bona had won a contest at the Spanish court, become first international winner of chess.

Cutro was destroyed by an earthquake on March 8, 1832. It remained the most populous centre of the region until the mid-20th century, when a strong emigration flow towards Germany and northern Italy (especially in Reggio Emilia) reduced the number of inhabitants considerably.

== Population ==
The population in Cutro (as of 2017) is 10,575.

== Notable people ==
- Giovanni Leonardo Di Bona (1st international chess tournament champion)
- Vincenzo Iaquinta (footballer)
- Rino Gaetano (Songwriter, born in Crotone, from a Cutro family)
