= Savelli, Calabria =

Savelli
- Comune
- Comune di Savelli
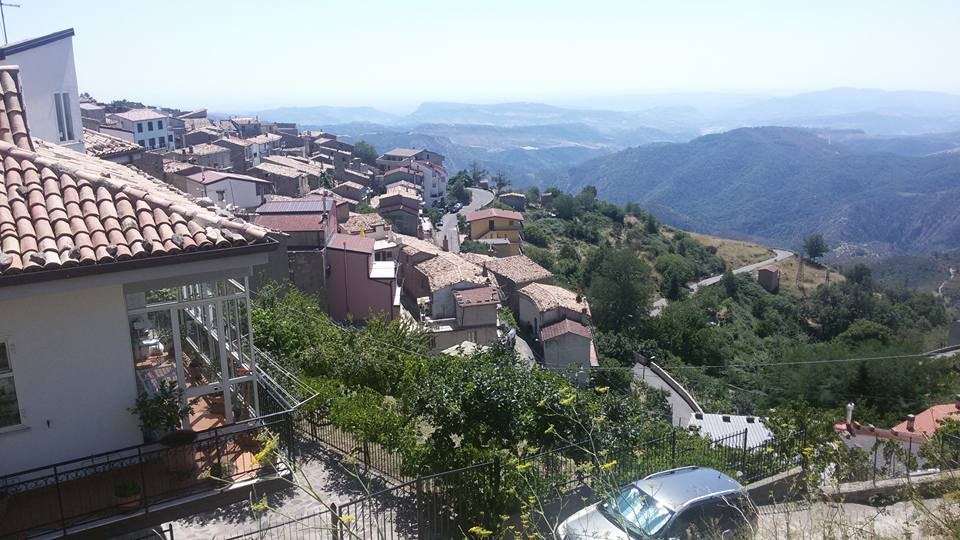

- Coat of arms

- Location within Italy Location within Calabria
- Coordinates: 39°19′N 16°47′E
- Country: Italy
- Region: Calabria
- Province: Crotone (KR)
- Frazioni: Mezzocampo, Villaggio Pino Grande

Government
  - Mayor: Domenico Frontera

Area
  - Total: 48.92 km^{2} (18.89 sq mi)
- Elevation: 1,014 m (3,327 ft)

Population (30 December 2008)
  - Total: 1,048
  - Density: 21.42/km^{2} (55.48/sq mi)
- Demonym: Savellesi
- Time zone: UTC+1 (CET)
  - Summer (DST): UTC+2 (CEST)
- Postal code: 88825
- Dialing code: 0984
- Patron saint: Sts. Peter and Paul
- Saint day: 29 June
- Website: Official website

Savelli is a comune and town in the province of Crotone, in Calabria, southern Italy, located within the Sila National Park.

It was founded in 1638 by Carlotta Savelli, a noblewoman of the Roman family of the Savelli.

== Twin towns ==
- Albano Laziale, Italy
- Grant Town, United States
