= Belvedere di Spinello =

- Comune
- Comune di Belvedere di Spinello
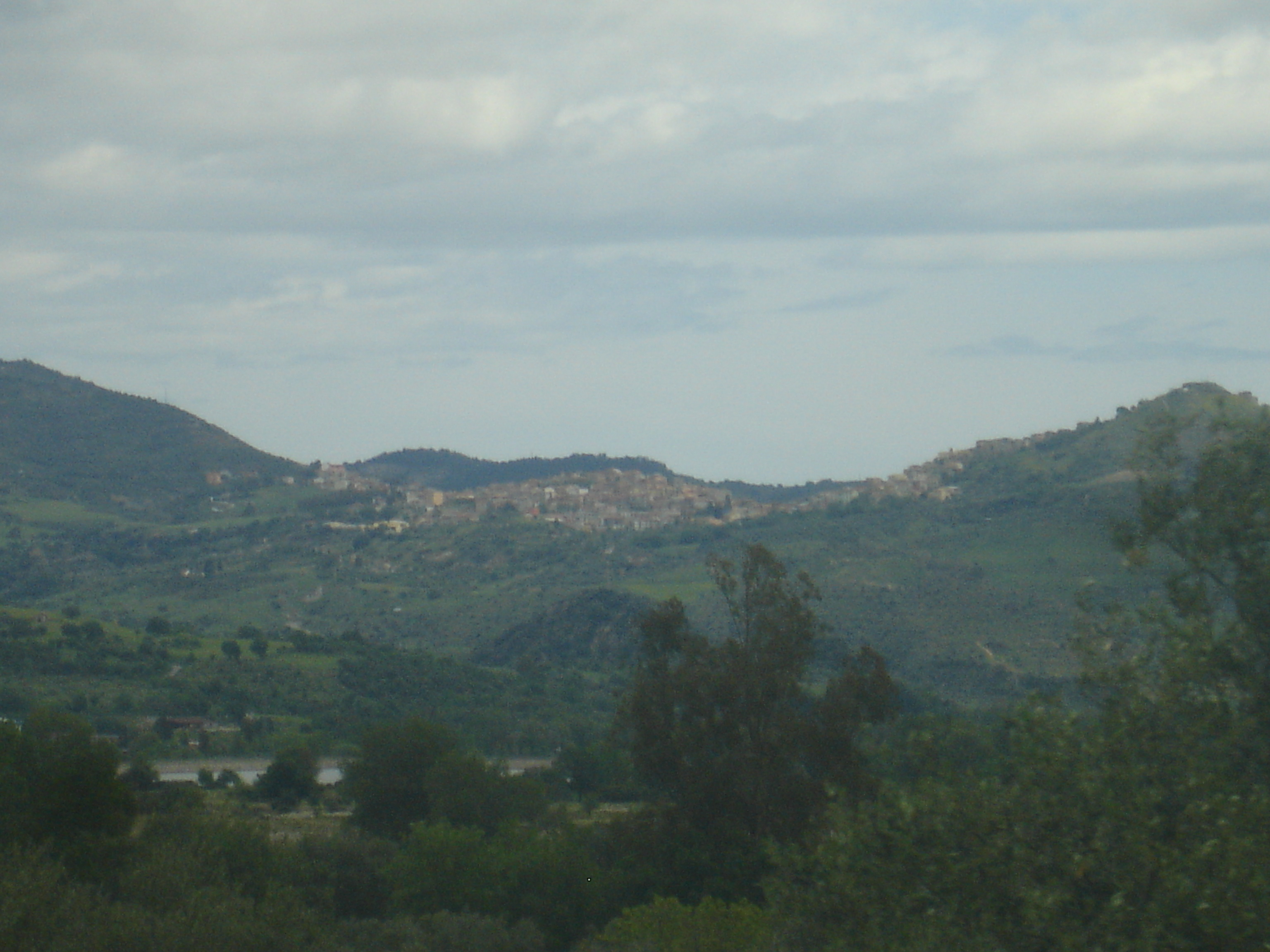

- Location within Italy Location within Calabria
- Coordinates: 39°13′N 16°53′E
- Country: Italy
- Region: Calabria
- Province: Crotone (KR)
- Frazioni: Belvedere, Spinello, Poligrone

Government
  - Mayor: Antonio Amato

Area
  - Total: 30.19 km^{2} (11.66 sq mi)
- Elevation: 330 m (1,080 ft)

Population (30 April 2012)
  - Total: 2,267
  - Density: 75.09/km^{2} (194.5/sq mi)
- Demonym: Belvederesi
- Time zone: UTC+1 (CET)
  - Summer (DST): UTC+2 (CEST)
- Postal code: 88824
- Dialing code: 0962
- Website: Official website

Belvedere di Spinello (Calabrian: Bervidìri o Spiniaddru) is a comune and town in the province of Crotone, in Calabria, southern Italy. The settlement has historically been inhabited by an Arbëreshë community, which now has assimilated. It is formed by two separate villages, Belvedere and Spinello, unified into a single commune in 1863.

== Twin towns ==
- Rho, Italy, since 2014
- Erding, Germany, since 2014
