= Castelsilano =

- Comune
- Comune di Castelsilano
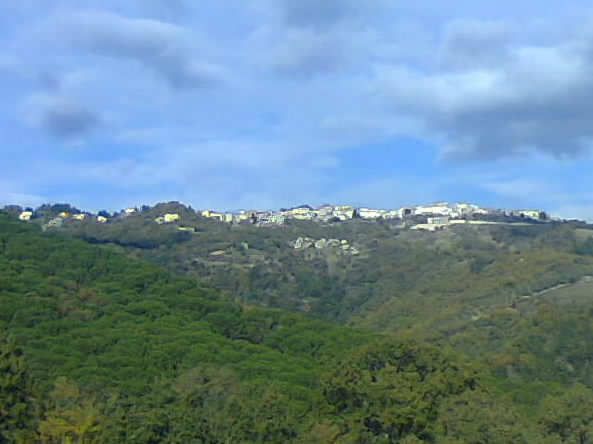

- Location within Italy Location within Calabria
- Coordinates: 39°16′18″N 16°46′09″E
- Country: Italy
- Region: Calabria
- Province: Crotone (KR)
- Frazioni: none

Government
  - Mayor: Francesco Durante

Area
  - Total: 39.51 km^{2} (15.25 sq mi)
- Elevation: 900 m (3,000 ft)

Population (2011)
  - Total: 1,034
  - Density: 26.17/km^{2} (67.78/sq mi)
- Demonym: Castelsilanesi
- Time zone: UTC+1 (CET)
  - Summer (DST): UTC+2 (CEST)
- Postal code: 88834
- Dialing code: 0984
- Patron saint: San Leonardo
- Saint day: November 6
- Website: Official website

Castelsilano is a comune and town with a population of 1034 people in the province of Crotone, in Calabria, Italy.

== History ==
Castelsilano was founded in 1685 when Scipione Rota, Prince of Acherontia, decided on the construction of a fortified structure to rest during his long hunting expeditions and as a place to stay during the summer months. The surrounding area around these fortified houses was built gradually. Called Castrum Casini originally, it became a municipality under the name of Casino on 14 August 1811 by decree of King Joachim Murat.

In 1916, the town passed from the province of Cosenza to that of Catanzaro. The name was changed from Casino to Castelsilano in June 1950. Starting in 1994, following the establishment of five new provinces, Castelsilano became part of the province of Crotone.

In 1980, a Libyan MiG-23 jet fighter crashed in the mountains near the town. The event is speculated to be connected to the loss of Itavia Flight 870.

== Economy ==
Castelsilano relies on the production of oil, wine, and citruses and the intense breeding of cattle.
