= Fabrizio Savelli =

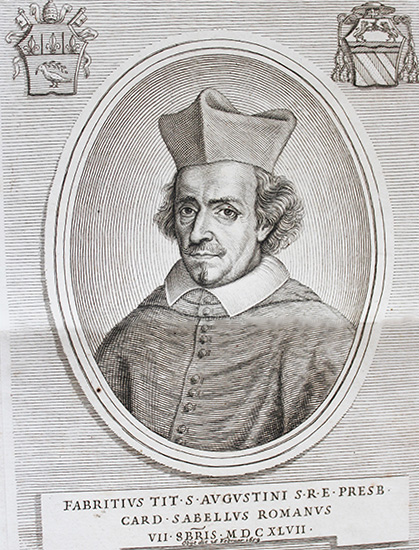
Fabrizio Savelli

Fabrizio Savelli (1607 – 26 February 1659) was an Italian military leader, commander of papal troops and, later, a Catholic Cardinal.

== Early life ==
Savelli was born in 1607 of the House of Savelli which included Pope Honorius IV (1285 - 1287). He was the nephew of Cardinal Giulio Savelli and the uncle of Cardinal Paolo Savelli. As a young man he received military training and later commanded troops in a number of regional conflicts.

During the First War of Castro, Savelli was given the title of Generalissimo and was put in command of a contingent of papal troops fighting the Dukes of Parma. However, according to contemporary John Bargrave, Savelli had great respect for the Dukes and also believed Pope Urban VIII would not live long and so the war was futile. As a result, Savelli moved his troops slowly and was hesitant to engage in battle. Pope Urban relieved Savelli of his command and appointed his nephew, Taddeo Barberini, in Savelli's place.

== Ecclesiastic career ==
Savelli, though, was not severely punished. Instead, he was brought back to Rome and in 1642, he was elected Archbishop of Salerno with dispensation for not having yet received the presbyterate. He was consecrated in October of that year, in Rome by Cardinal Alessandro Cesarini with Francesco Gonzaga, Bishop of Cariati e Cerenzia, serving as co-consecrator.

Thereafter he was named nuncio in Poland.

Savelli was made cardinal in the consistory of 7 October 1647. He was named legate in Bologna in 1648 and then legate in Ravenna and Ferrara. He participated in the papal conclave of 1655 which elected Pope Alexander VII.

He became Minister of Poland before the Holy See in 1658 and died in February of the following year.
