= Cerenzia =

- Comune
- Comune di Cerenzia
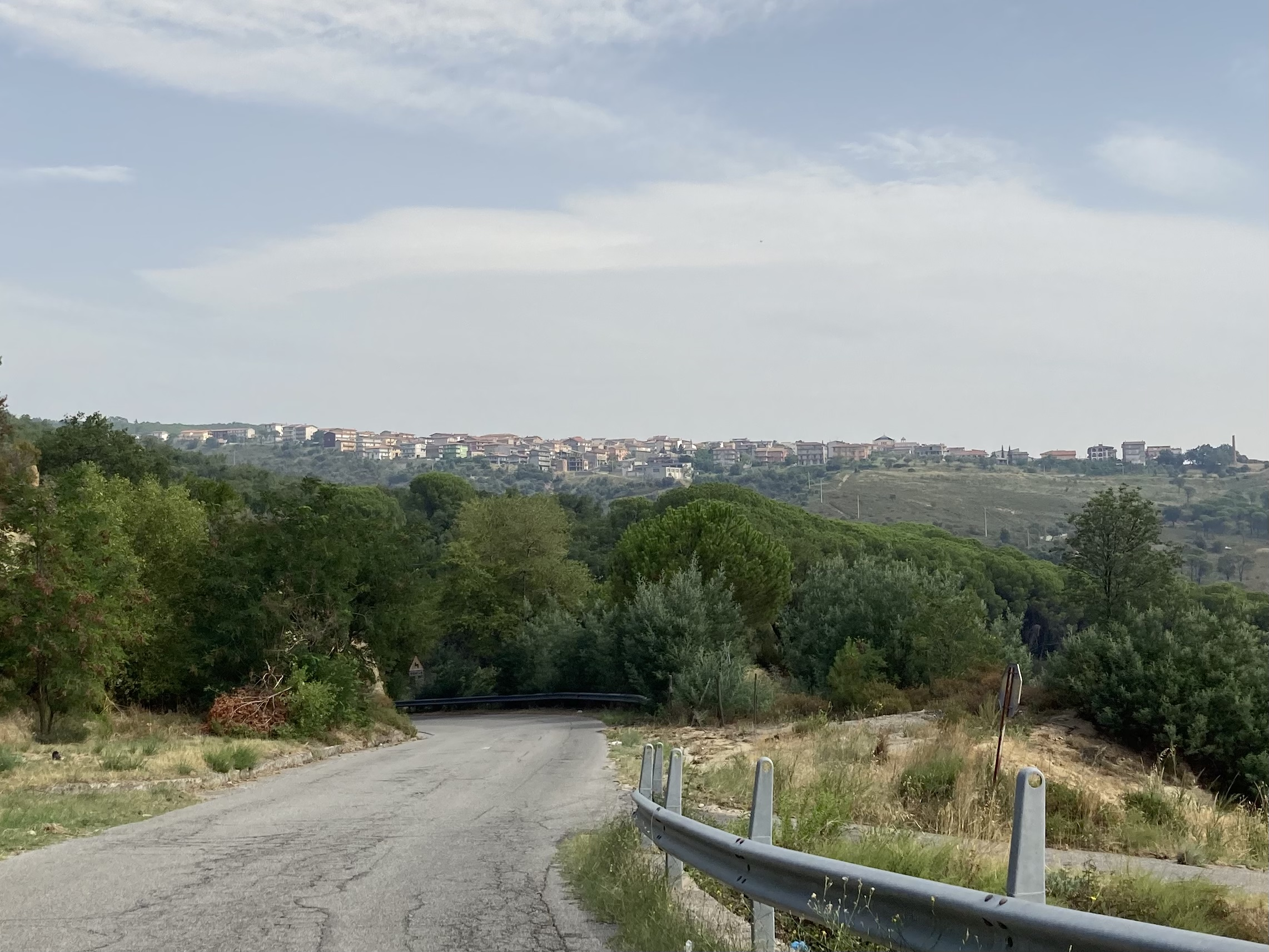

- Location within Italy Location within Calabria
- Coordinates: 39°14′40″N 16°47′00″E
- Country: Italy
- Region: Calabria
- Province: Crotone (KR)
- Frazioni: Zinga

Area
  - Total: 39 km^{2} (15 sq mi)
- Elevation: 900 m (3,000 ft)

Population (December 31, 2004)
  - Total: 1,273
  - Density: 33/km^{2} (85/sq mi)
- Demonym: Cerentisi
- Time zone: UTC+1 (CET)
  - Summer (DST): UTC+2 (CEST)
- Postal code: 88822
- Dialing code: 0984
- Patron saint: San Teodoro d'Amasea
- Saint day: November 9

Cerenzia is a town, comune (municipality), former bishopric and Latin titular see with a population of 1000 people in the province of Crotone, in Calabria region, southernmost peninsular Italy.

The modern town is besides the Ancient settlement Acerenthia, now a rural site known as Cerenzia vecchia ('old C.'), which includes the ruins of the cathedral dedicated to Saint Theodorus of Amasea, all abandoned to peasantry by the second half of the Ottocento (19th century).

== Ecclesiastical history ==
Circa 960 was founded a Diocese of Cerenz(i)a (Italian) / Pumentum (Latin) / Cerenza / Geruntin(us) (Latin adjective), bordering its invariable Metropolitan, the Archdiocese of Santa Severina, as well as the bishoprics of Umbriatico, Rossano and Cosenza. Its tiny territory comprised Cerenzia itself, the (now defunct) hamlets of Verzino and Lucrò and the castrum of Caccuri.

It is first documented in the Notitia Episcopatuum of the Patriarchate of Constantinople, edited under Byzantine emperor Leo VI the Wise (died 912).

Until the Norman conquest of Calabria (mid 11th century), it was in the sway of the above patriarchate and used its Greek-language Byzantine rite. A papal bulla by Pope Lucius III in 1183 explicitly mentions its being a suffragan of Santa Severina.

Noted early (late 11th century) bishop Policronius, recuperated the 'Greek' abbey of Santa Maria di Altilia. The bishoprics rich gifts and possessions aroused greed among the local barons, especially Marchisorto, count of Crotone Stefano, tried to impose in 1205 his chaplain, Madio, instead of legitimate bishop Guglielmo, elected by the (cathedral) chapter.

The arrival of the Angevine rule spelled the diocese's decline, among more conflict with the feudal lords, requiring appeals to Metropolitan and Pope.

Mid Trecento (14th century), the area suffered health problems like malaria and from its poor position, even for drinking water, leading to the city being abandoned and the countryside depopulated by harsh feudal impositions.

In 1342 the phrase 'Bishop of Cerenzia and Cariati' was coined, after the new effective seat, and in 1437[4], Pope Eugenius IV formally erected a Diocese of Cariati, immediately placing it in personal union (aeque principaliter) with the old see of Cerenzia. Given the decay of Cerenzia and its episcopal palace, when the Council of Trento imposed on all bishops a fixed residence, Cariati at sea, despite its exposure to Ottoman Turkish raids, was chosen over sickly isolated Cerenzia.

A pest epidemic in 1528 caused the town of Cerenzia and its five parishes to be abandoned, losing its diocesan archive. È in questa occasione che andò in gran parte perduto anche l'archivio. Visiting in the late Cinquecento, bishop Properzio Resta described its pitiful state, including cathedral and palace (Pesavento). Bishops' attempts in the Seicento and Settecento to restore the cathedral and build a new palace were undone by repeated, demotivating earthquakes.

As part of a reorganization of the dioceses of the Kingdom of the Two Sicilies, Pope Pius VII in 1818 incorporated the already united territory of the diocese of Cerenza into that of the diocese of Cariati, later merged itself into the present Archdiocese of Rossano-Cariati Vincenzio d'Avino,

As is customary, the bull referred to the see in adjectival form, and called it ecclesia Geruntina, suggesting as the Latin substantive (noun) form: Geruntia. The Annuario Pontificio gives Pumentum as the Latin substantive form and Cerenza, rather than Cerenzia, as the Italian form, but indicates Geruntinus as the Latin adjective.

=== Residential Ordinaries ===
Incomplete : first incumbent(s?) lacking

- Policronio (1099? – ?)
- Giberto (1198? – ?)
- Guglielmo (? – death 1208)
- Bernardo, Cistercian Order (O. Cist.) (1208 – death 1216)
- Nicola (1216 – death 1233?)
- Matteo, O. Cist. (1234 – ?)
- Nicola (1342.08.13 – ?), also Bishop of Cariati (Italy) (1342.08.13 – ?)
- Giovanni Fardini, Dominican Order (O.P.) (1372.12.22 – ?)
- Jacques de la Chastre, O.P. (1391.02.22 – ?)
- Guglielmo (1394.02.13 – ?)
- Gerardo (? – 1394.02.13), next Archbishop of Rossano (Italy) (1394.02.13 – 1399.09.27), Metropolitan Archbishop of Santa Severina (Italy) (1399.09.27 – death 1400)
- Tommaso Rossi (1420.12.23 – 1429.05.18), next Bishop of Oppido Mamertina (Italy) (1429.05.18 – 1429.12.23), Bishop of Strongoli (Italy) (1429.12.23 – death 1433)

TO BE COMPLETED

- ...

From 1481 (personal union), see the Bishops of Diocese of Cariati.

=== Titular see ===
The diocese was nominally restored in 1968 as Latin Titular bishopric of Cerenzia (Curiate Italian) / Pumentum (Latin) / Cerenza / Geruntin(us) (Latin adjective).

It has had the following incumbents, so far of the fitting Episcopal (lowest) rank :

- Andrea Bernardo Schierhoff (born USA) (1968.11.11 –death 1986.12.01), first as Auxiliary Bishop of Archdiocese of La Paz (Bolivia) (1968.11.11 – 1982.12.17), then as Apostolic Vicar of Pando (Bolivia) (1982.12.17 – 1986.12.01)
- José María Arancibia (1987.02.26 – 1993.02.13) as Auxiliary Bishop of Archdiocese of Córdoba (Argentina) (1987.02.26 – 1993.02.13); later Coadjutor Archbishop of Mendoza (Argentina) (1993.02.13 – 1996.03.25), succeeding as Metropolitan Archbishop of Mendoza (1996.03.25 – retired 2012.11.10)
- Pere Tena Garriga (1993.06.09 – death 2014.02.10) as Auxiliary Bishop of Archdiocese of Barcelona (Catalonia, Spain) (1993.06.09 – 2004.06.15) and on emeritate; previously Undersecretary of Congregation for Divine Worship (1987.07.29 – 1988.06.28) and Undersecretary of Congregation for Divine Worship and the Discipline of the Sacraments (1988.06.28 – 1993.06.09)
- José Trinidad Fernández Angulo (2014.04.17 – ...), as Auxiliary Bishop of Archdiocese of Caracas (Venezuela) (2014.04.17 – ...).

== Economy ==
Cerenzia relies on the production of oil, wine, cereals, citruses and the intense breeding of the cattle.

== See also ==
- List of Catholic dioceses in Italy

== Sources and external links ==
- GCatholic – (former &) titular see

Bibliography – ecclesiastical

- Ferdinando Ughelli, Italia sacra, vol. IX, second edition, Venice 1721, coll. 498–505
- Vincenzio d'Avino, Cenni storici sulle chiese arcivescovili, vescovili e prelatizie (nullius) del Regno delle Due Sicilie, Napels 1848, pp. 138–139
- Giuseppe Cappelletti, Le Chiese d'Italia dalla loro origine sino ai giorni nostri, vol. XXI, Venice 1870, pp. 258–259
- Domenico Taccone-Gallucci, Regesti dei Romani Pontefici per le chiese della Calabria, Rome 1902, p. 444
- Andrea Pesavento, La cattedrale rovinata di San Teodoro a Cerenzia Vecchia, in La Provincia KR nr. 21-23/1998
- Paul Fridolin Kehr, Italia Pontificia, X, Berlin 1975, p. 129
- Norbert Kamp, Kirche und Monarchie im staufischen Königreich Sizilien, vol 2, Prosopographische Grundlegung: Bistümer und Bischöfe des Königreichs 1194 – 1266; Apulien und Kalabrien, Münich 1975, pp. 897–904
- Pius Bonifacius Gams, Series episcoporum Ecclesiae Catholicae, Leipzig 1931, p. 869
- Konrad Eubel, Hierarchia Catholica Medii Aevi, vol. 1, p. 261; vol. 2, p. 158
- Papal bulla 'De utiliori', in Bullarii romani continuatio, vol. XV, Rome 1853, pp. 56–61
