= Rocca di Neto =

- Comune
- Comune di Rocca di Neto
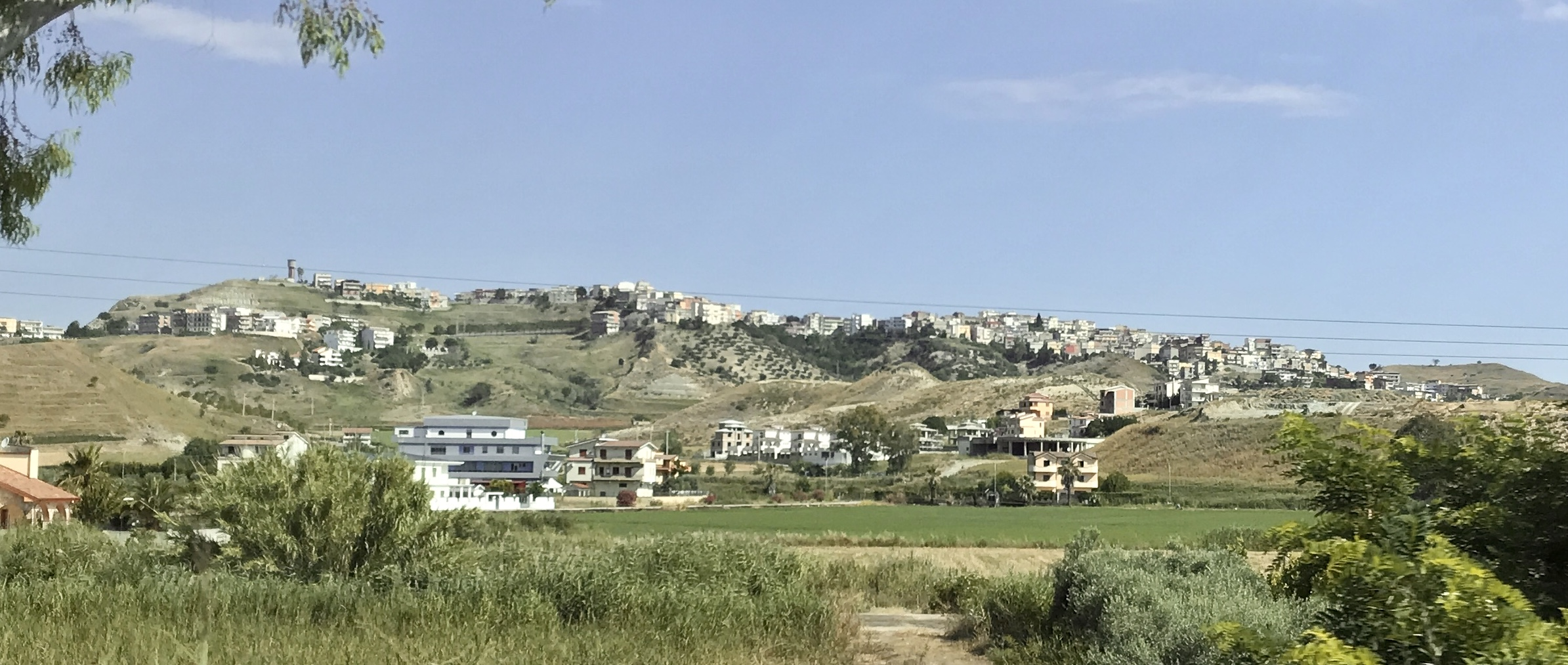

- Location within Italy Location within Calabria
- Coordinates: 39°11′25″N 17°0′20″E
- Country: Italy
- Region: Calabria
- Province: Crotone (KR)
- Frazioni: Setteporte, Topanello

Government
  - Mayor: Salvatore Claudio Cosimo

Area
  - Total: 43 km^{2} (17 sq mi)
- Elevation: 180 m (590 ft)

Population (31 December 2010)
  - Total: 5,657
  - Density: 130/km^{2} (340/sq mi)
- Demonym: Rocchitani
- Time zone: UTC+1 (CET)
  - Summer (DST): UTC+2 (CEST)
- Postal code: 88821
- Dialing code: 0962
- Patron saint: St. Martin of Tours
- Saint day: 11 November

Rocca di Neto is a town and comune of the province of Crotone in the Calabria region of southern Italy. It is crossed by the Neto river from which it takes its current name; until 1863 it was known as Rocca Ferdinandea in honour of king Ferdinand I of Two Sicilies.
