= Caccuri =

Caccuri Greek: Kakóros
- Comune
- Comune di Caccuri
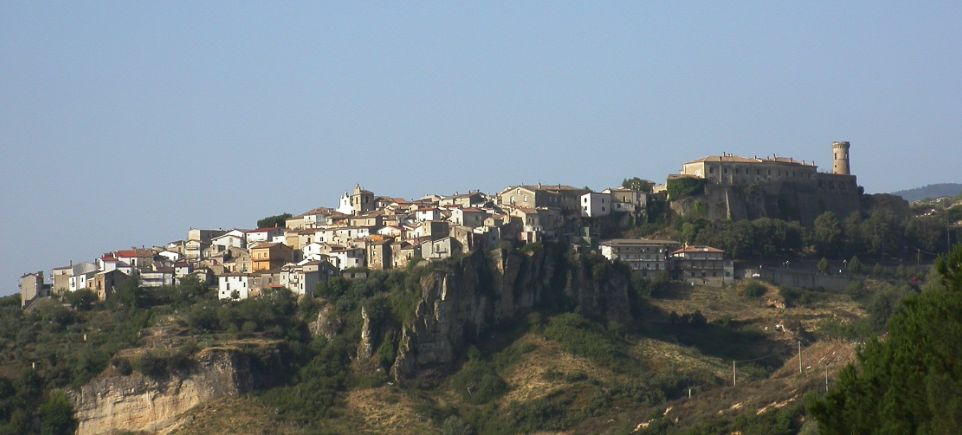

- Coat of arms

- Location within Italy Location within Calabria
- Coordinates: 39°14′N 16°47′E
- Country: Italy
- Region: Calabria
- Province: Crotone (KR)
- Frazioni: Santa Rania

Government
  - Mayor: LUIGI QUINTIERI

Area
  - Total: 57 km^{2} (22 sq mi)
- Elevation: 646 m (2,119 ft)

Population (2018-01-01)
  - Total: 1,780
  - Density: 31/km^{2} (81/sq mi)
- Demonym: Caccuresi
- Time zone: UTC+1 (CET)
  - Summer (DST): UTC+2 (CEST)
- Postal code: 88833
- Dialing code: 0984
- Patron saint: St. Roch
- Saint day: August 16

Caccuri is a comune and town in the province of Crotone in Calabria, southern Italy. It is one of I Borghi più belli d'Italia ("The most beautiful villages of Italy").

It is the birthplace of Renaissance statesman Cicco Simonetta.

== Main sights ==
- Caccuri castle, built over Byzantine fortress dating to the 6th century. It was restored several times, the last in 1885. The most visible element is the only tower, called Torre Mastrigli, which is the town's symbol. Currently a great part of the castle is in a state of decay. The feudal chapel houses Neapolitan school artworks.
- Mother church (St. Mary of Graces). Of medieval origins but rebuilt in the 15th century, it lies in the historical centre. It was damaged by the earthquakes of 1638 and 1808. The church has a nave and two aisles.
- Church of Santa Maria del Soccorso (16th century). It houses a Baroque altar with a statue of St. Dominic.
- Canalaci Fountain (1884)
- St. Roch sanctuary

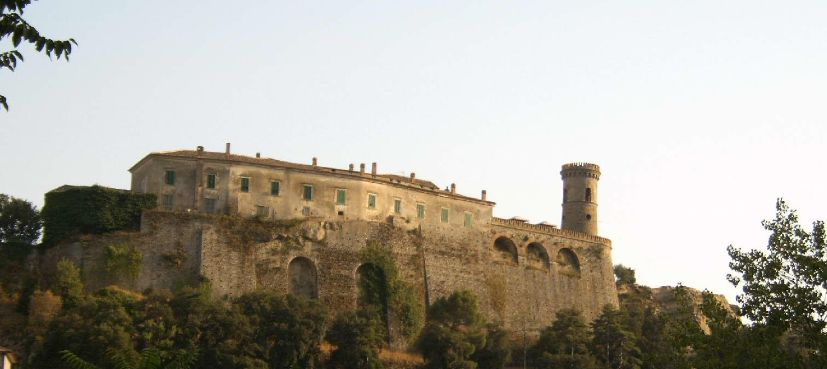
Caccuri castle.
