= San Mauro Marchesato =

- Comune
- Comune di San Mauro Marchesato
- Location within Italy Location within Calabria
- Coordinates: 39°06′15″N 16°55′40″E
- Country: Italy
- Region: Calabria
- Province: Crotone (KR)
- Frazioni: -

Government
  - Mayor: Michele Mario Rajani Levino

Area
  - Total: 45 km^{2} (17 sq mi)
- Elevation: 288 m (945 ft)

Population (December 31, 2004)
  - Total: 1,002
  - Density: 22/km^{2} (58/sq mi)
- Demonym: Sanmauresi
- Time zone: UTC+1 (CET)
  - Summer (DST): UTC+2 (CEST)
- Postal code: 88831
- Dialing code: 0962
- Patron saint: San Nicola
- Saint day: December 6
- Website: Official website

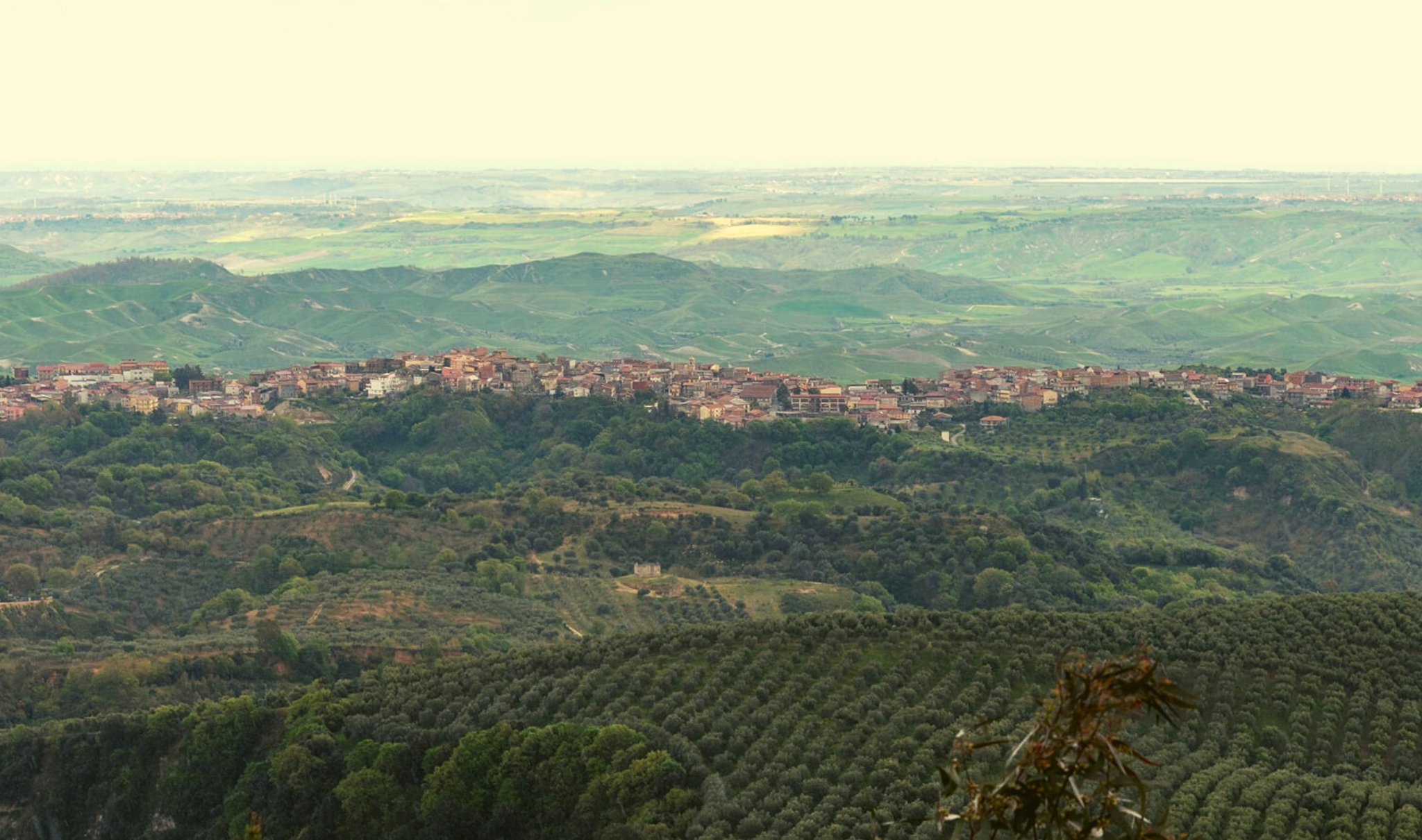

San Mauro Marchesato is a town with a population of 2002 people in the province of Crotone, in Calabria, Italy. It is in the centre of Marchesato.
