= Umbriatico =

- Comune
- Comune di Umbriatico
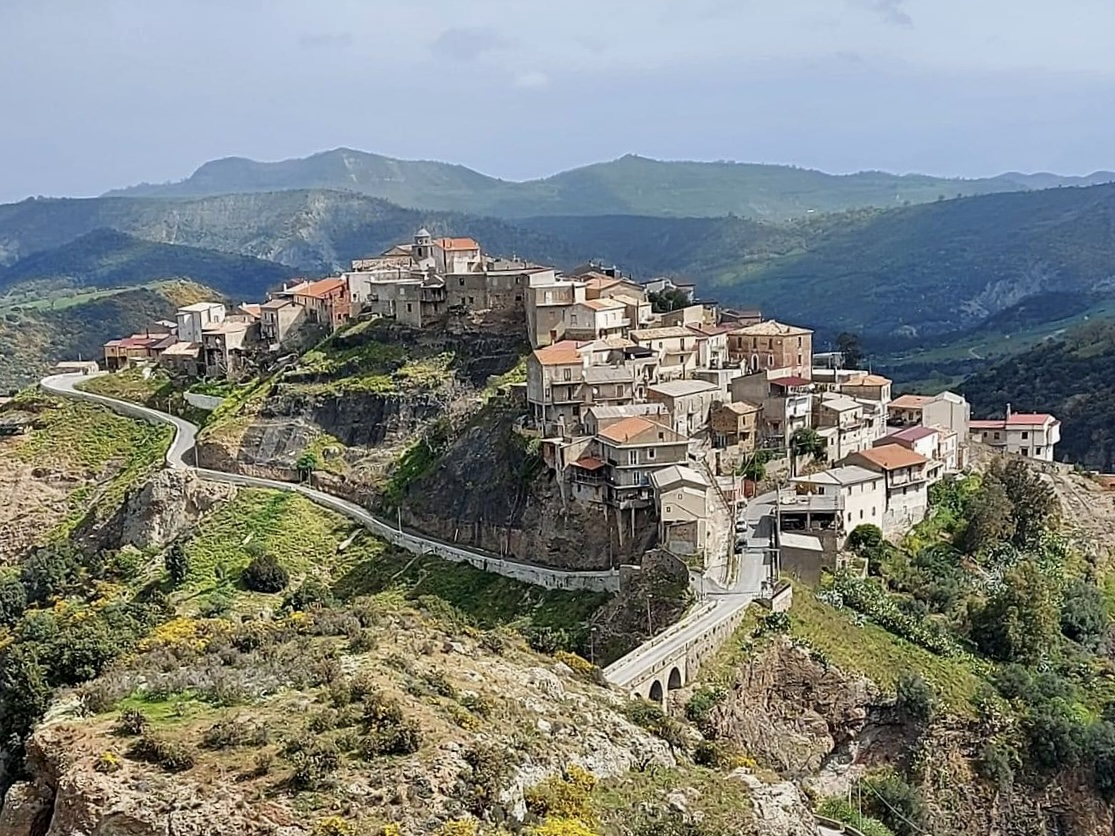

- Coat of arms

- Location within Italy Location within Calabria
- Coordinates: 39°21′N 16°54′E
- Country: Italy
- Region: Calabria
- Province: Crotone (KR)
- Frazioni: Perticaro

Government
  - Mayor: Pietro Grillo

Area
  - Total: 72 km^{2} (28 sq mi)
- Elevation: 422 m (1,385 ft)

Population (2007)
  - Total: 930
  - Density: 13/km^{2} (33/sq mi)
- Time zone: UTC+1 (CET)
  - Summer (DST): UTC+2 (CEST)
- Postal code: 88823
- Dialing code: 0962

Umbriatico is a comune and town in the province of Crotone, in Calabria, southern Italy. As of 2007 Umbriatico had an estimated population of 930.

== History ==
Umbriatico was founded by the Oenotrians before the arrival of the Greek colonists who founded nearby Kroton. During the Second Punic War it had a defensive wall, but this did not prevent the Romans from storming it and massacring the population.

During the Middle Ages Umbriatico was the seat of a bishopric, which was abolished as a residential see in 1818 and brought into use as a titular diocese of the Catholic Church in 1969.

The town is now a small agricultural and livestock-breeding centre.
