= Vaccarizzo Albanian =

Albanian dialect of Calabria, Italy

- Native to: Italy
- Region: Calabria (Vaccarizzo Albanese and San Giorgio Albanese)
- Native speakers: (undated figure of c. 3,000)
- Language family: Indo-European: Albanian; Tosk; Southern; Arbëresh; Vaccarizzo Albanian
- Writing system: Latin

Language codes
- ISO 639-3: –
- Glottolog: cala1254
- Linguasphere: 55-AAA-ahd

Vaccarizzo Albanian, or Calabria Arbëresh, is a subdialect of the Arbëresh dialect of the Albanian language. Spoken in the villages of Vaccarizzo Albanese and San Giorgio Albanese in southern Italy by approximately 3,000 people, Vaccarizzo Albanian has retained many archaic features of the Tosk dialect, on which the Standard Albanian is based.

== Classification ==
Vaccarizzo Albanian is a dialect of Arbëresh, which is a dialect of Tosk, one of the two major dialects of the Albanian language. Within Arbëresh along with the subdialects of Macchia, San Cosmo Albanese, San Demetrio Corone, Santa Sofia d'Epiro it belongs to a group of dialects spoken in the region of Cosenza. Although it is a part of the Tosk dialects, Vaccarizo Albanian also contains a few Gheg elements.

== Features ==
The communes of Vaccarizzo Albanese and San Giorgio Albanese were founded by Albanian refugees after the conquest of Albania by the Ottoman Empire and the subsequent mass migration of Albanians to Italy. As all Arbëresh dialects, Vaccarizzo Albanian exhibits many medieval elements of the Albanian language. However, unlike other Arbëresh dialects, which under southern Italian dialectal influence have undergone a process of partial or total fricativization resulting in the change of the intervocalic voiced velar plosive ([ɡ]) to a voiced velar fricative ([ɣ]), Vaccarizzo Albanian has retained the initial [ɡ].

Another feature of the Vaccarizzo dialect is the sonorization of the voiceless velar fricative [x], which also occurs in the Arbëresh dialects of the region. As Albanian dialects of the Balkans it exhibits doubly articulated consonants; however, unlike in Balkan Tosk dialects, the final unstressed schwa rarely appears in Vaccarizzo.
