= San Demetrio Corone =

- Comune
- Comune di San Demetrio Corone and Bashkia e Shën Mitrit
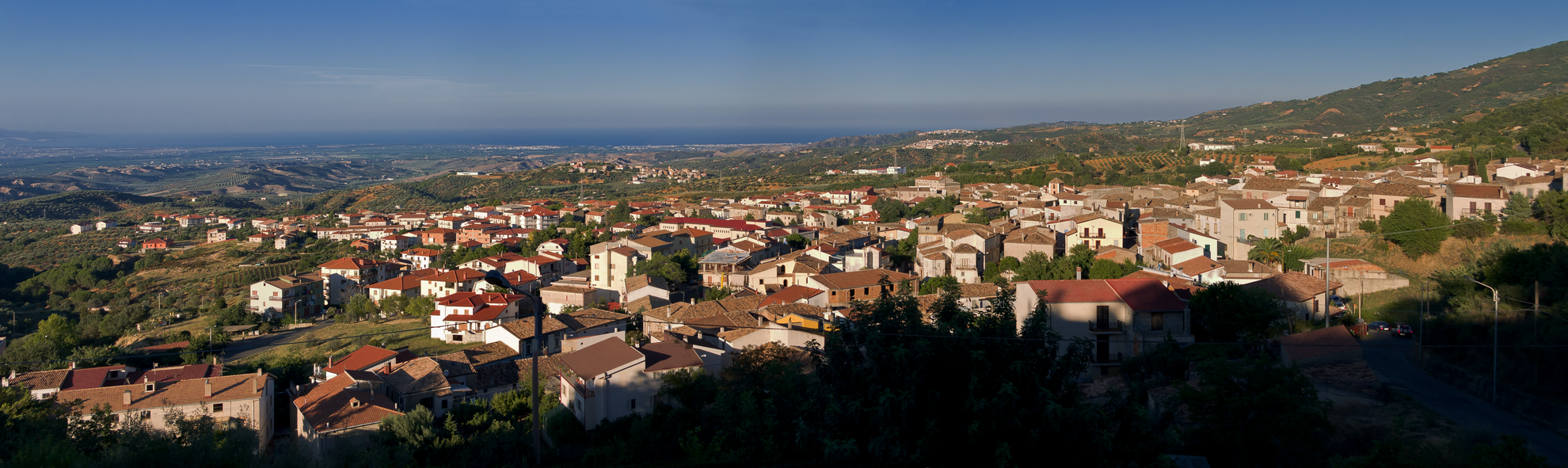

- Coat of arms

- Location within Italy Location within Calabria
- Country: Italy
- Region: Calabria
- Province: Cosenza (CS)
- Frazioni: Macchia Albanese, Guriza, Sofferetti, Sant'Agata, San Nicola, Piedigallo

Government
  - Mayor: Salvatore Lamirata

Area
  - Total: 61.87 km^{2} (23.89 sq mi)
- Elevation: 521 m (1,709 ft)

Population (31 December 2010)
  - Total: 3,693
  - Density: 59.69/km^{2} (154.6/sq mi)
- Demonym: Sandemetresi (Arbëreshë: Shënmitrotë)
- Time zone: UTC+1 (CET)
  - Summer (DST): UTC+2 (CEST)
- Postal code: 87069
- Dialing code: 0984
- Patron saint: St. Demetrius Megalomartyr
- Saint day: 26 October
- Website: Official website

San Demetrio Corone (Arbëreshë: Shën Mitri) is a town and municipality in the Calabria region of Italy, at an altitude of 521 meters and with 3,387 inhabitants. The town is among the most important cultural centers of the Albanian communities in Italy and preserves the Albanian language, the Byzantine rites, customs, culture and ethnic identity of its origin. It is home to the Collegio of Sant'Adriano, a boarding school which produced many patriots and theorists/revolutionaries in the Italian Independence wars and is an important religious and cultural organism for the conservation of the oriental rite and of the Albanian traditions. It is part of the district of the Italo-Albanian Church of the Eparchy of Lungro.

In the Macchia Albanese hamlet, located at 418 meters above sea level, Girolamo De Rada was born, supreme vate arbëresh, father of modern Albanian literature.

For years the music, singing and new sounds of the Albanians of Italy have been grouped here in "The Festival of the Arbëreshe Song".

== Geography ==
The village is surrounded by lush vegetation and overlooks the Piana (plains) di Sibari. The topographic altitudes oscillate, for the higher southern area, between 500 and 800 meters above sea level and between 400 and 40 meters for the northern portion. The entire territory is characterized by a rather developed and complex hydrographic network. Almost all of them are tributaries of the Crati river.

In the upper part the dominant vegetation is represented by chestnut groves. The northern area, on the other hand, sloping down towards the Piana di Sibari, has a morphology with the presence of plateaus and terraces. The territory, of a total of 7,500 hectares, has a vision of the Pollino National Park and the Ionian Sea It is bordered by Acri, Corigliano-Rossano, San Cosmo Albanese, Vaccarizzo Albanese, Santa Sofia d'Epiro, Tarsia and Terranova da Sibari.

== History ==
San Demetrio Corone was built in the late 15th century by exiled Albanians forced into exile by the Ottoman invasion into Albania.

The Albanian exiles built the inhabited center near the ancient oratory of Sant'Adriano, where in 10th century Nilus the Younger began his activity, founding a basilian monastery on the ruins of the small church dedicated to Saints Adriano and Natalia. He resided in San Demetrio for twenty-five years, laying the foundations of a Greek monastic institution whose task was the reunification between the churches of East and West. He had taken refuge to pray, living in a cave, creating a local basilian monastic life. However, the area was inhabited in a previous period, always dating back to settlements of oriental monks (VII century). The first settlement was known in Latin as Situ Sancti Dimitri , even if its inhabitants have always called it katundi i Shën Mitrit . Evidence of the fact that a small monastery existed before the arrival of the Albanians is given by the Capitulations of November 3 1471, when the Archimandrite abbot Paolo Greco went to the notary De Angelis to draw up a deed which registered the commitment to welcome the Albanian refugees following the Duke Teodoro Lopez in the hamlet of San Demetrio, with the right to cultivate the land.

In 1534 there was a new immigration following the war that Charles V waged against the Turks: the Greeks and Arvanites of Corone, city of Morea, today Peloponnese, were welcomed by the Emperor in the Kingdom of Naples and distributed in the various villages founded by their predecessors, including San Demetrius.

After the constitution of the Kingdom of Italy the name "Corone", in memory of the diaspora, in particular the second one, was added to the municipality (1863).

San Demetrio Corone is the seat of the Italo-Albanian College of Sant'Adriano: originally called Collegio Corsini, it was established by Pope Clement XII in 1732 in San Benedetto Ullano, in order to prepare the Italo-Albanian clergy to the preservation of the Byzantine rite - Greek. It was then transferred to San Demetrio Corone in 1794, following the request of Bishop Francesco Bugliari. Since 1794 the history of the area has been deeply linked to that of the college, founded by king Ferdinand IV in place of the suppressed monastery. It became an important cultural organism of the Albanians of Italy, as well as the first cultural training institute in Calabria, from whose walls luminous figures of the Italian Risorgimento emerged such as Agesilao Milano (1830–1856) and Domenico Mauro (1812–1873), and writers and jurists such as Cesare Marini (1792–1865) and Girolamo De Rada (1814–1903). The 7 November 2018, in occasion of the 550th anniversary of the death of the Albanian hero Giorgio Castriota Scanderbeg, in San Demetrio Corone, were hosted in a participatory event of the President of the Italian Republic, Sergio Mattarella, and the President of Albania, Ilir Meta.

== Monuments and places of interest ==
=== "Grotta di San Nilo" ===
- On the steep slope near the Sant'Elia stream, the remains of a small hermit sanctuary known as the "Grotta di San Nilo", where he had taken refuge to pray in 10th century the Saint Nilus the Younger.

=== Religious architectures ===
- Basilian church of Sant'Adriano, founded by Nilus the Younger in 955, later the Italo-Albanian College of Sant'Adriano (1794), is an example of early Norman-Byzantine architecture and contains some mosaics and other medieval artifacts.

=== Italo-Albanian College Library ===
The monumental complex preserves the historical College memories, it brings with it the inheritance from its foundation to the last period of the college.The historical library was founded in 1732 by Pope Clement XII was transferred from San Benedetto Ullano to San Demetrio Corone in 1793 . The books are divided into two lists of pre-existing cataloging, one called: Fondo Antico, the other said: Fondo Moderno.

== Society and Culture ==
=== Popular traditions ===
During the commemoration of the dead, the visit of the priests ( papades ) to the families, to proceed with the blessing of the " panagie " (table with wine, bread, boiled wheat and a candle superimposed in the center), symbols of the resurrection of bodies and of the immortality of the soul.

It is customary, by tradition, between the night of Saturday and Sunday of Holy Week ( Java and Madhe ), to go to the fountain of the monks (' 'pusi') at the Collegio di San Adriano, to perpetuate the rite of stealing water . Usually it goes in groups, in complete silence, according to a rule which must not be transgressed, even if the temptations are not lacking. in defense of this rule it is used the " dokaniqie ", long stick with the forked end. Here a large bonfire ( qeradonulla ) is lit in front of the churchyard. At the moment of ignition, the Greek song " Kristos Anesti " (Christ is risen) is praised. In the morning at 5:30 a mass is held in the church called the dawn mass or "FJALA E MIRE"

On October 26 there is the feast of patron saint, and the fair is held for three days. Tradition has it that on the day of the eve, from the main door of the church, the "horse of St. Demetrius" ( kali i Shèn Mitrit ) comes out, supported by two people behind it. It is made of papier-mâché and goes from house to house, carrying greeting messages and receiving in exchange money, wine or other. On Ash Wednesday, during the carnival, the funeral of " Nikolla " is held, an old man dressed in rags with various characters. Soon after, the devils ( djelzit ) enter the scene, covered in goatskin.

On August 26, instead, Saints Adriano and Natalia, co-patrons of the town, are celebrated and also on the occasion of this holiday there are three days of fair.

To visit is the workshop of the master Hevzi Nuhiu, an artist sculptor of wood, with valuable works with oriental ornamental motifs.

Also worth seeing are the costumes or handcrafted dolls with the characteristic Albanian costume.

=== Institutions, organizations and associations ===
Among the cultural institutions it is worth mentioning the "De Rada" Center, built on the initiative of the municipal administration, which promotes culture Arbëreshë through extensive programs and cultural initiatives.

=== Languages and dialects ===
==== Some phrases in the arbëreshë of San Demetrio Corone ====
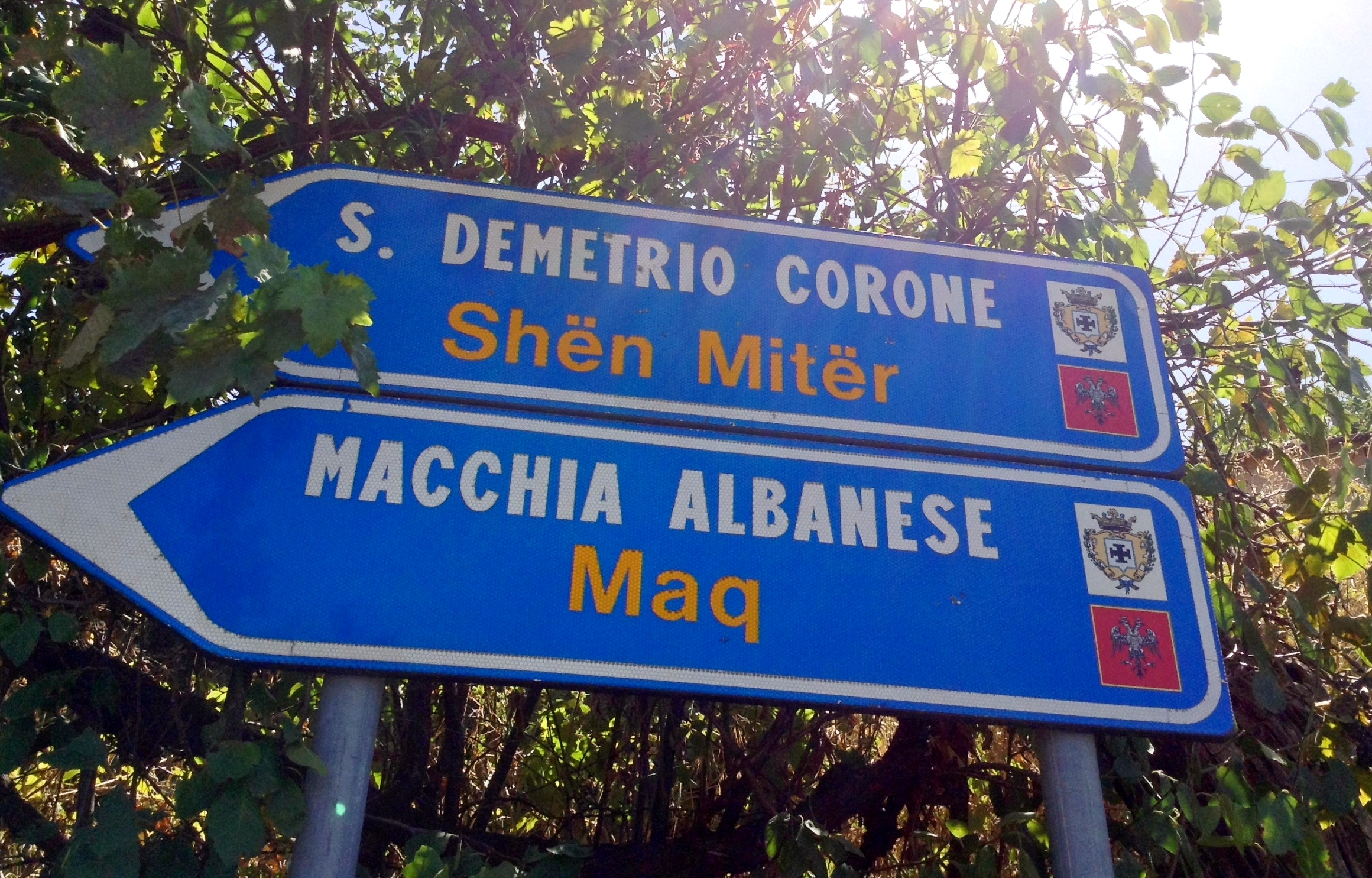
street sign in Arbëreshë

Shihemi prana!	See you later !
Si vemi?	How are you ?
U nëng rri mirë, jam sëmurë	I'm not fine, I'm sick
Fiet arbërisht?	Do you speak arbëreshë?
Si t'e thonë? Mua m'e thonë...	What's your name? My name is...
Gëzohem se të njoh	I'm happy to meet you
Eh	Yes
Jo	Not

=== Ethnicities and foreign minorities ===
According to ISTAT data as of 31 December 2009, the foreign resident population was 124 people. The nationalities most represented on the basis of their percentage of the total resident population were:

1. Albania 53 4.87%

== Administration ==
The town is part of the Arbëria Union ( Lidhja Arbëria ) made up of the Albanian Towns of San Demetrio Corone, Santa Sofia d'Epiro, San Giorgio Albanese, Vaccarizzo Albanese and San Cosmo Albanese.

== People ==
- Nilus the Younger, saint and Basilian monk, hermit, abbot, amanuensis
- Girolamo De Rada, writer and poet
- Domenico Mauro, literate
- Agesilao Milano (1830–1856), soldier who tried to assassinate Ferdinand II, King of the Two Sicilies
- Cesare Marini, jurist
- Giuseppe Salvatore Bellusci, politician
- Cesare Marini, politician
