= Angelo Masci =

Angelo Masci (Arbërisht: Ëngjëll Mashi; 1758–1822) was an Italian Arbëresh jurist and scholar.

== Life ==
Born in Santa Sofia d'Epiro on 7 December 1758 to Noè and Vittoria Bugliari he first studied under Stefano Baffa. At the age of twelve, Masci moved to Naples to continue his studies there under the supervision of his uncle Giuseppe (Zep) Bugliari, chaplain of the Royal Macedonian Battalion of Naples. An alumnus of the faculty of law of the university of Naples, in 1809 he was appointed chief prosecutor of the court of cassation of Catanzaro and in 1810 royal commissioner of northern Calabria and Basilicata.

== Works ==
Masci's first published work was Esame politico-legale de dritti, e delle prerogative de'Baroni del regno di Napoli (1792), a treatise on the legal system in regard to the baronial privileges in the Kingdom of Naples. The treatise was used as a polemic against the possible establishment of baronial control over the Italo-Albanian College of San Demetrio Corone. In 1807, his best-known work Discorso sull'origine, costumi, e stato attuale della nazione Albanese was published in Naples. Using mostly classical works as sources, Masci grouped Illyrian, Macedonian and Epirote into one language family, which he considered the Ursprache of Albanian, but didn't name and identify it. His work influenced Conrad Malte-Brun, who republished it with the title Essai sur l'origine, les moeurs et l'état actuel de la nation albanaise in his Annales des voyages, de la géographie et de l'histoire. In turn, Malte-Brun's essays partially influenced Giuseppe Crispi, who wrote the first monograph on the Albanian language, however, unlike Masci, Malte-Brun and Crispi identified that language family with Pelasgian.
