= Giulio Variboba =

Arbëresh poet

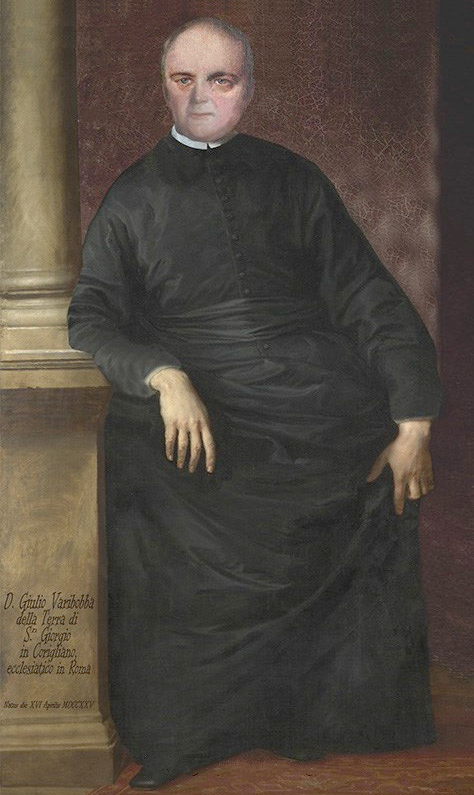
- Giulio Variboba
- Born: October 1725; San Giorgio Albanese, Cosenza, Calabria, southern Italy
- Died: 1788 (aged 64); Rome, Italy
- Occupations: priest and poet
- Writing career
- Genre: Poetry
- Notable works: Ghiella e Shën Mëriis Virghiër (English: The life of the Virgin Mary, in modern Albanian: Gjella e Shën Mërisë së Virgjër, Rome 1762

Giulio Variboba (Arbërisht: Jul Variboba; 1725–1788) was an Arbëresh poet that gave an important contribution to the literature in the Albanian language.

== Life ==
Variboba was born in San Giorgio Albanese in the province of Cosenza to a family originally from the Mallakastra region of southern Albania. He studied at the Corsini seminary in San Benedetto Ullano, a centre of learning and training for the priesthood of the Italo-Albanian Catholic Church. This seminary, founded in 1732 by Pope Clement XII, affected the cultural advancement of the Arbëresh of Calabria in the eighteenth century similar to that of the Greek seminary of Palermo for the Arbëresh of Sicily. Variboba, one of its first students, was ordained as a priest in 1749 and returned to his native San Giorgio to assist his elderly father Giovanni, archpriest of the parish. Even during his studies at the Corsini seminary, Variboba had shown a definite preference for the Latin liturgical rites over the standard Byzantine Rite in the Arbëresh church. In later years, his polemic support for a transition to the Latin rites made him quite unpopular with both his parish and with the local church hierarchy in Rossano, in particular after his direct appeal to the Pope. He was eventually forced into exile, initially to Campania and Naples, and in 1761 settled in Rome where he spent the rest of his days.

== Poetry work ==
Despite the turmoil of these years, Variboba must have known moments of tranquillity, too, for it was soon after his arrival in Rome that his long lyric poem Ghiella e Shën Mëriis Virghiër, Rome 1762 (English: The life of the Virgin Mary, in modern Albanian: Gjella e Shën Mërisë së Virgjër, with Gjella meaning Life in English), was published. It was the only Arbëresh book printed in the eighteenth century. This loosely structured poem of 4,717 lines, written entirely in the dialect of San Giorgio Albanese and loaded with much Calabro-Sicilian vocabulary, is devoted to the life of the Virgin Mary from her birth to the Assumption. Though from the poet's own life history and his uncompromising and polemic attitude to church rites, one might be led to expect verse of intense spiritual contemplation, the Ghiella evinces more of a light-hearted, earthy ballad tone, using Variboba's native Calabria as a background for the nativity and transforming the devout characters of the New Testament into hearty eighteenth-century Calabrian peasants.

== Legacy ==
Variboba is unique in early Albanian literature, both in his clear and simple poetic sensitivities and in the variety of his rhythmic expression, though the quality of his verse does vary considerably. The strength of The life of the Virgin Mary interspersed as it is with folk songs, lies indeed in its realistic and down-to-earth style, often pervaded with humour and naivety, and in the fresh local colour of its imagery.

== Sources ==
- Albanian literature from Robert Elsie
