= Giuseppe Serembe =

Arbëresh writer

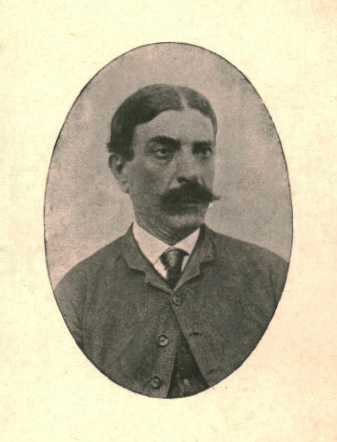
- Zef Serembe in a portrait photo
- Born: 6 March 1844; San Cosmo Albanese, province of Cosenza, Calabria, southern Italy
- Died: 31 December 1901 (aged 57); São Paulo, Brazil
- Occupations: writer, poet,
- Writing career
- Period: 1864–1900
- Genre: Poetry
- Notable works: The returning soldier, lyric ballad, (Italian: Il reduce soldato ballata lirica)

Giuseppe Serembe (Arbërisht: Zef Serembe; 6 March 1844 – 31 December 1901) was an Arbëresh lyric poet.
