= Schirò =

Schirò is an Italian surname. Notable people with the surname include:

- Niccolò Schirò (born 1994), Italian racing driver
- Thomas Schirò (born 2000), Italian professional footballer

== See also ==
- Giuseppe Schirò
- Schiro
