= Shqiponjat (folk group) =

Italo-Albanian folk music group

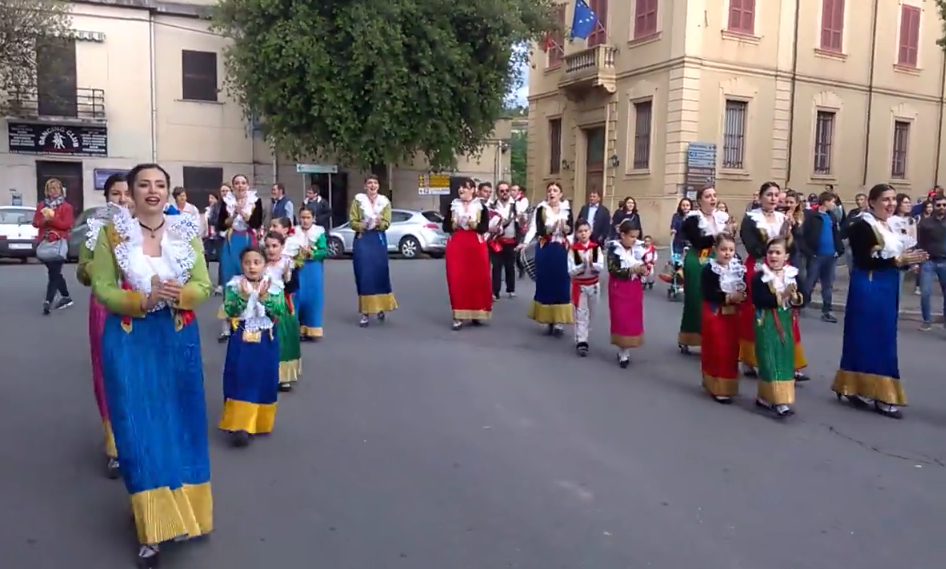
Folk group Shqiponjat in Cosenza

Shqiponjat (Albanian: "Eagles") is a popular Italo-Albanian folk music group based in Santa Sofia d'Epiro, Calabria, Italy.

== History ==
Coat of arms of the House of Kastrioti

The folk group was born on initiative of 12 girls in a small town of Albanian origin (Arbëreshë) called Santa Sofia D’Epiro in the spring of 1994, and became a cultural association 10 years later.

In accordance with the emblem (two-headed eagle) of the homeland of their ancestors (Albania), they chose the name Shqiponjat which means eagles. (See also: Arbëreshë people#Early migrations)

Over the years, the number of members has grown, and today includes 30 female dancers, aged 12 to 30 years, and an orchestra of 7 male musicians. The group's goal is to keep the ancient arbëreshë values and the traditions, included songs and costumes alive.

The 'Eagles' (Shqiponjat) perform with a formation composed only by women. From ancient manuscripts and the oral tradition, it appears that, at the time of the Ottoman invasion in Albania, women – in addition to the family hearth - were dancing and singing to honor their husbands returning from battle.

== Music repertoire ==
Shows offered by Shqiponjat represent the long journey that their ancestors had undertaken from the faraway Albanian coast to reach the Calabria territory in Italy at the end of the 15th century.

In addition to the typical dances of the Albanian capital Tirana, there are those of Kosovo, in honor of the Albanian national hero, Skanderbeg and those of the northern and southern Albanian regions. Regarding the arbëreshe tradition, there are dances linked to the traditional “Vallja” (Albanian: Vallet shqiptare), to the cycle of seasons or to the theme of love and nostalgia. The arbëresh repertory includes the ancient traditional rhymed and often improvised songs, called “vjershë” (poem), performed without musical accompaniment, sung only by double or triple voices.

== Exhibitions ==
Works developed by Shqiponjat are orientated to recover the origins of history as well as the Albanian culture, but, more than anything else, it wants to be a sort of “spiritual heredity”, or simply, a good reason to re-live a past still inside them, giving strength, at the same time, to the sense of belonging to the same community with their roots in the past and their wings towards the future.

The originality, serious work of research, and the skill of the artists, allowed the group to obtain prizes and awards not only in Italy and abroad, where often the group was called to represent the Italian-Albanian minority. For more than 20 years of activity the group, has constantly taken part in a lot of local, regional and national folkloric events.

- In 2003, the group participated at Eurofestival Mediterraneo (Mediterranean Euro Festivals) in San Cosmo Albanese and was named the best Arbëreshgroup with its theatrical representation of “Java Nusses” (the week of the bride).
- In 2004, for the 10th anniversary from the foundation, the group decided to organize in Santa Sofia d'Epiro a two day show of the recovery of their traditions called “Moti ç’ ish në herë” (as it once was).
- In 2005, the group participated in Santa Sofia d'Epiro at the traditional arbëreshë olympic games “Lumi bashkë” (“Let’s play together”).
- In 2006, the ‘Eagles’ (Shqiponjat) fly to Albania to take part in the international folkloric festival “Vlore 2006” in Vlorë
- in 2007, they participated at the Festival Mesdhetar in Valona and
- in 2008, two young Arbreshë lovers, Thanasi and Anmaria, are the protagonists of the theatrical representation Një Spingullanele Ari held between the characteristic districts (gjitonia) of Santa Sophia d'Epiro
- in September 2008, the ‘Eagles’ took part at the festival of Gjirokastër “Argjiro 2008” in Argirocastro in South Albania
- In 2011, they fly to Wilstedt, in Germany, called there to represent the Italian Arbëria.

== Photo gallery ==
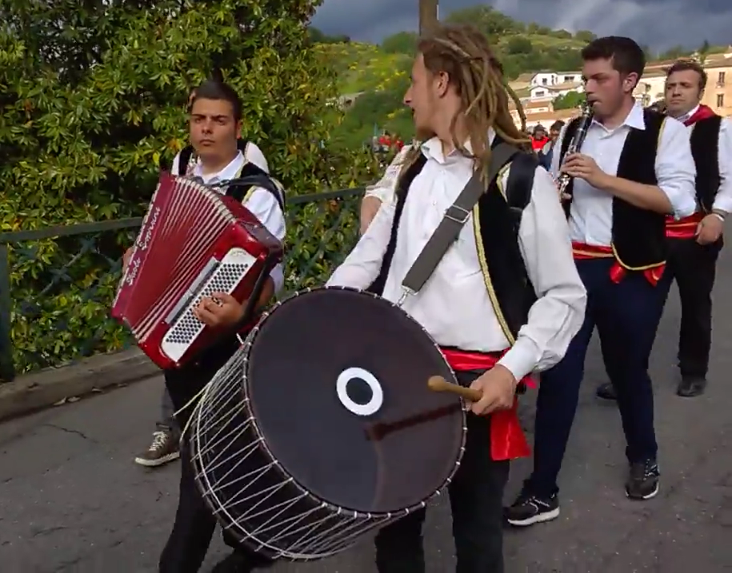

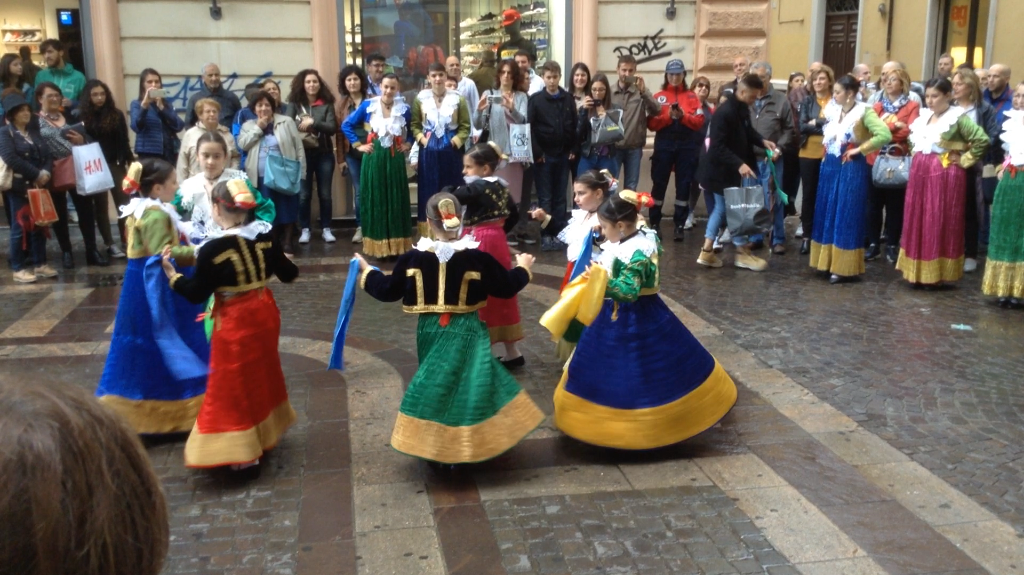

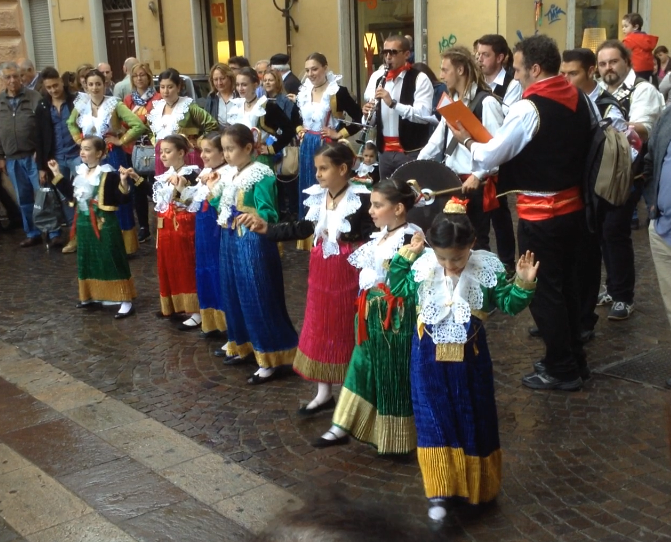

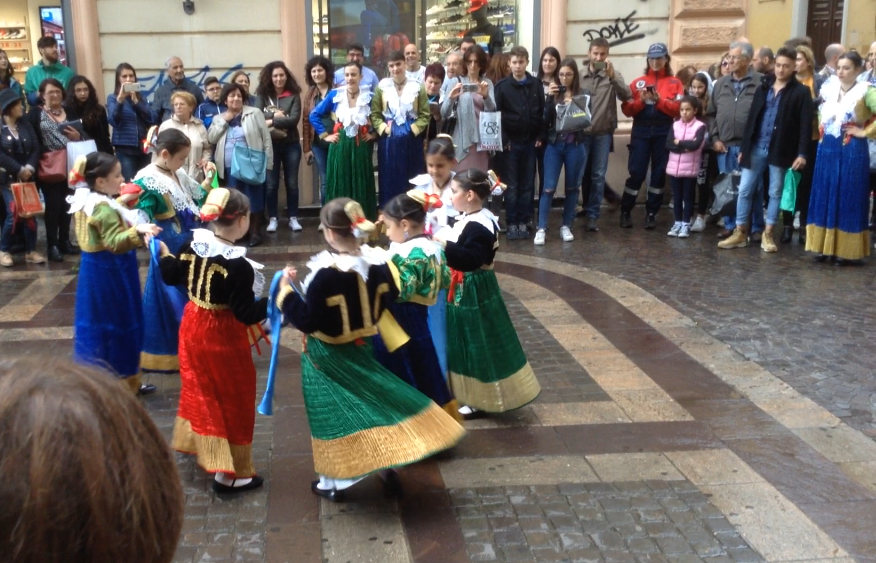

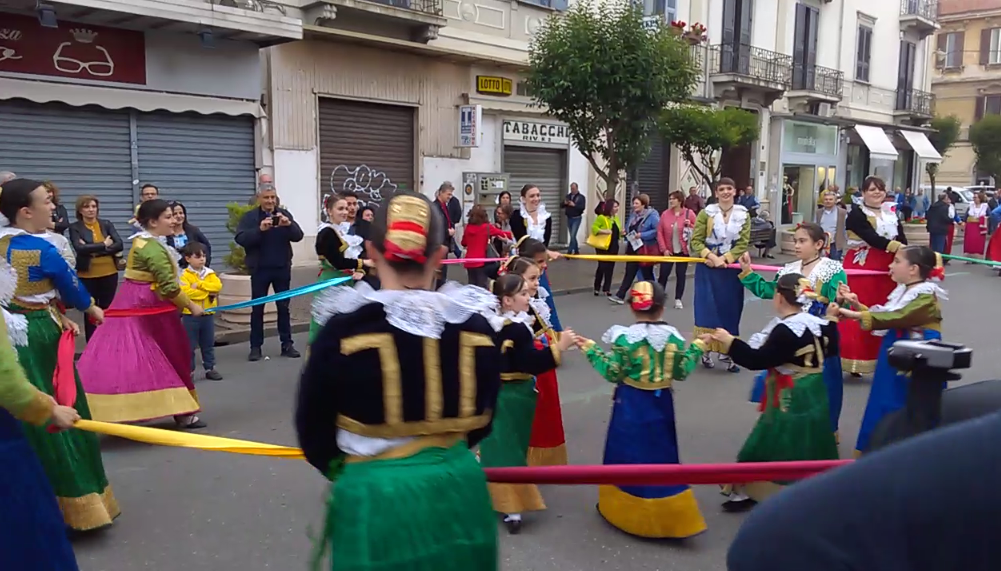

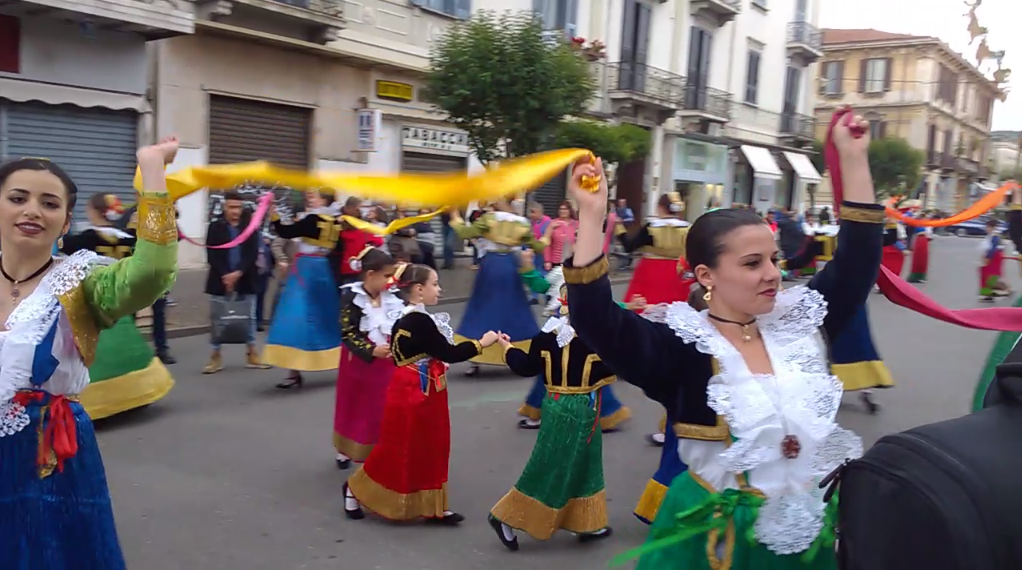

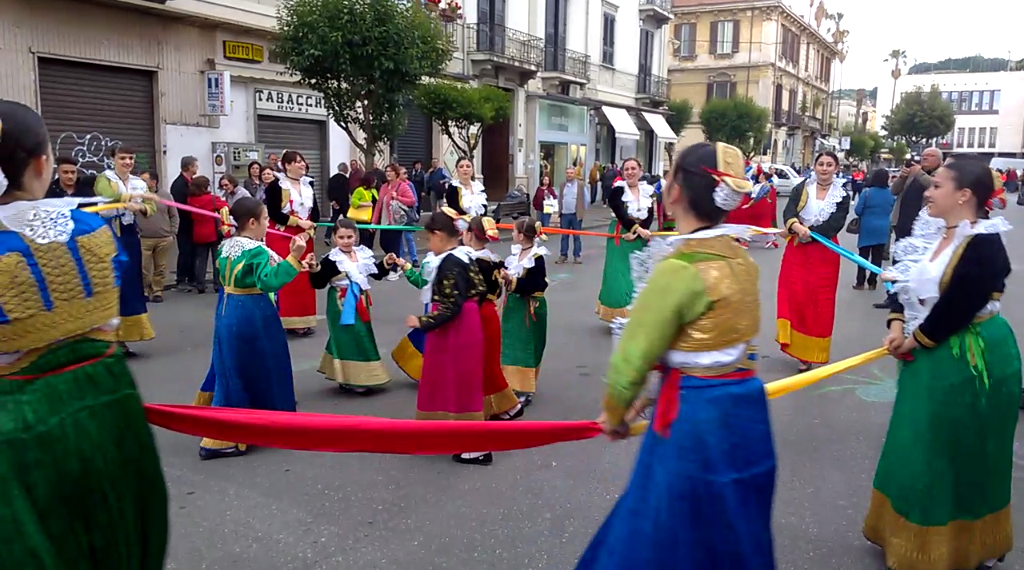
