= Nicola Chetta =

Arbëresh writer and priest

- Nikollë Keta
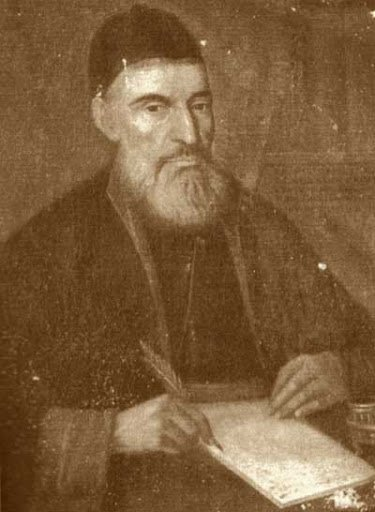
- Born: 12 July 1741; Contessa Entellina, Sicily
- Died: 15 December 1803 (aged 62); Palermo, Sicily

Nicola Chetta on a 2023 stamp of Albania

Nicola Chetta, (Arbërisht: Nikollë Keta; 12 July 1741 – 15 December 1803) was an Arbëresh writer and priest. He was born in Contessa Entellina, Sicily. He was educated at the Italo-Albanian Catholic seminary in Palermo. In 1777, Keta himself became rector of the seminary. As a poet, he wrote both religious and secular verse in Albanian and Greek, and has the honour of having composed the first Albanian sonnet (1777).
