= Shqiponjat =

Shqiponjat may be:

- Shqiponjat (folk group)
- Shqiponjat (Ultras)
- Shqiponjat (police unit)
