= Albanian National League =

Political party in Albania

- Leader: Ismet Mehmeti
- Founded: 1997

Albanian National League (in Albanian: Lidhja Kombëtare Shqiptare) is a political party in Albania, founded in 1997. It is led by Ismet Mehmeti. The party has taken its name from a historic nationalist movement, Albanian National League founded by inhabitants from the arbëresh village of Santa Cristina Gela in Sicily, Italy.
