= Vaccarizzo Albanese =

- Comune
- Comune di Vaccarizzo Albanese
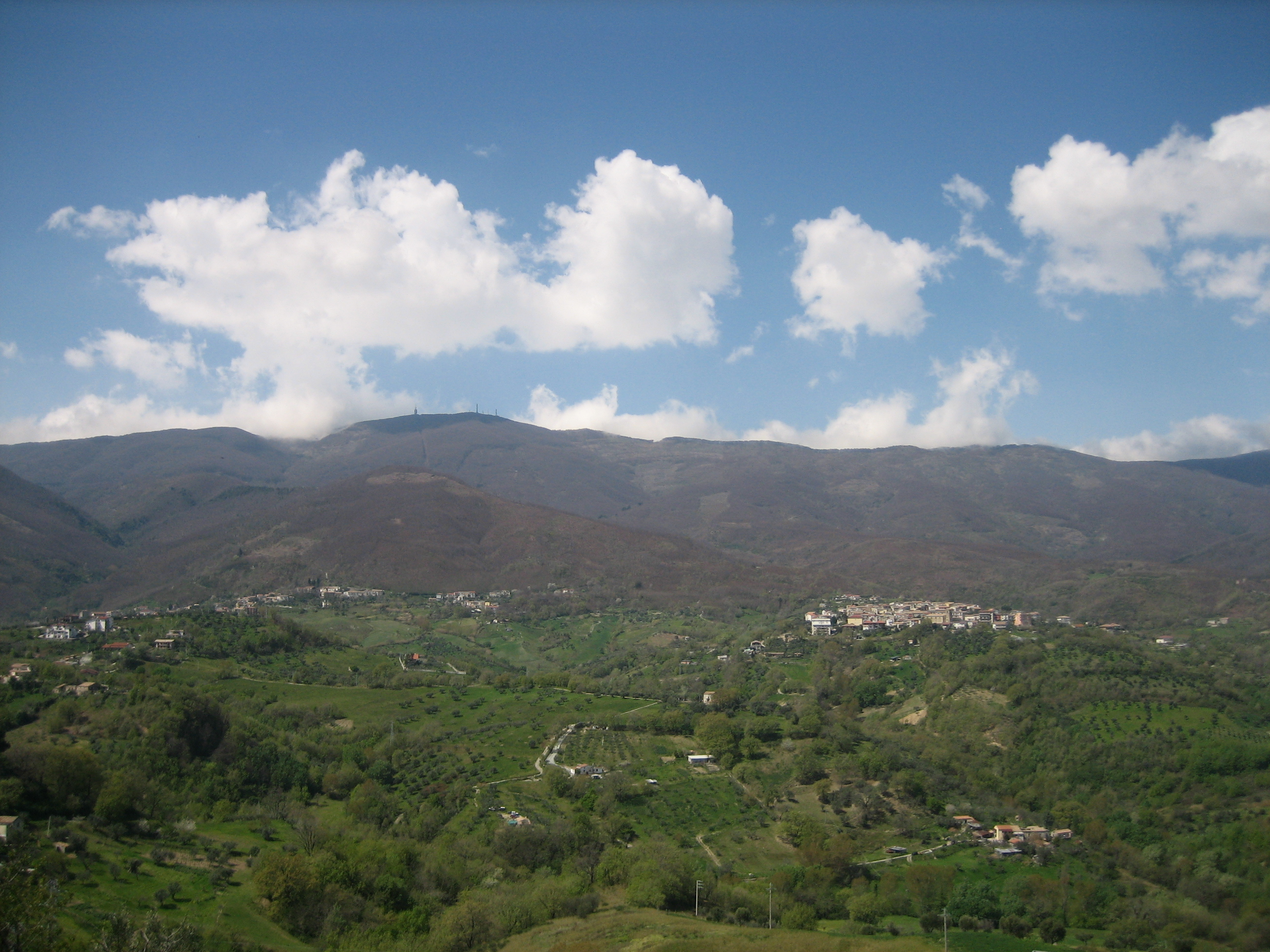

- Coat of arms

- Vaccarizzo within the Province of Cosenza

- Location within Italy Location within Calabria
- Coordinates: 39°35′N 16°26′E
- Country: Italy
- Region: Calabria
- Province: Cosenza (CS)

Government
  - Mayor: Antonio Pomillo

Area
  - Total: 8.53 km^{2} (3.29 sq mi)
- Elevation: 448 m (1,470 ft)

Population (30 November 2018)
  - Total: 1,098
  - Density: 129/km^{2} (333/sq mi)
- Demonym: Vaccarizzioti
- Time zone: UTC+1 (CET)
  - Summer (DST): UTC+2 (CEST)
- Postal code: 87060
- Dialing code: 0983
- Patron saint: Madonna of Constantinople
- Website: Official website

Vaccarizzo Albanese (Arbëresh: Vakarici) is an Italian town and comune (municipality) of the province of Cosenza, Calabria, southern Italy.

== History ==
The town was founded in 1470 as Vaccarizzo. In 1863 its toponym changed adding Albanese (i.e. "Albanian"), due to its origins.

== Geography ==
Vaccarizzo is bordered by Acri, San Cosmo Albanese and San Giorgio Albanese.

== Language ==
Vaccarizzo Albanian, the Arbëresh dialect of the Albanian language that is spoken in the villages of Vaccarizzo Albanese and San Giorgio Albanese, in southern Italy, by approximately 3,000 people. Vaccarizzo Albanian has retained many archaic features of the Tosk dialect, on which the Standard Albanian is based.
