= Bino (singer) =

Italian pop singer

Bino (born Benedetto Arico; * 24 April 1953 in Contessa Entellina; † 19 October 2010 in Contessa Entellina) was an Italian pop singer.

== Early life and career ==
Bino (real name Benedetto Arico) first studied architecture in order to take over his father's company. He returned to Italy and came back to Germany in 1975 as a musician, first to Schopfheim in the Black Forest. In nearby Bad Säckingen, he became a member of the existing group "I Figli Di Yuma" with which he toured the region and through Switzerland. Then he came to Oldenburg, where he once worked as an ice cream vendor, sometimes as a singer at festivals and on to Hamburg, where producer Rainer Felsen from Pino Music first took notice of him.

In 1978, working with Drafi Deutscher and Mike Mareen, Bino recorded Mama Leone., a song composed by German pop composer and singer Drafi Deutscher and was first sung in German version by Ruth Händel in 1976, but was not a success in this version or in the version by Mike Mareen released in the same year. A third version was released in 1978, sung by Bino. In addition to the German version, he also released an English and an Italian version with lyrics written by himself.

Bino landed his biggest success in 1978 with the song Mama Leone, with music composed by Drafi Deutscher and Mike Mareen. The song was recorded in Italian with lyrics by Bino, as well as a German version. For eight weeks, it was number 1 on the charts in Austria, and four weeks at the top position on the Swiss charts. On 23 November 1978, both versions were in the top 10 on the German charts. The Mama Leone album sold 20 million copies worldwide. In 1997, he dedicated his song to the late Catholic nun Mother Teresa. He later had two minor hits with the songs Bambino (18th in Germany) and Maria (25th place in Germany), both written by Drafi Deutscher.

For some years Bino lived with his girlfriend Katrin on Mallorca in Spain. He died at the age of 57 in Palermo with cancer.

== Discography ==
- 1978: Mama Leone (Carrere)
- 1980: Bino (RCA)
- 2003: Emozioni (Pingo)
