= Giuseppe Schirò Junior =

- Born: Giuseppe Schirò; 1905; Contessa Entellina, Palermo, Sicily
- Died: 1984 (aged 78–79); Rome, Italy
- Education: Corsini College
- Occupations: Scholar, literary historian

Giuseppe Schirò Junior (1905–1984) was an Italian scholar and literary historian.

Schirò was of Arbëreshë descent. He was born in Contessa Entellina (Albanian: Kuntisa), Sicily. He was referred as "junior" to distinguish him from the "Senior", the Arberesh poet Giuseppe Schirò (1865 – 1927).

Schirò studied at the Corsini College in San Demetrio Corone in Calabria. He worked as a teacher in Padua and Rome. Schirò's wrote on Albanian culture, the first work appeared in the 1940s. He is remembered in particular for his "Storia della letteratura albanese" ("History of Albanian Literature") published in Florence in 1959, being one of the most reliable histories of Albanian literature.
