= Contessa Entellina =

- Comune
- Comune di Contessa Entellina; Bashkia e Kuntisës
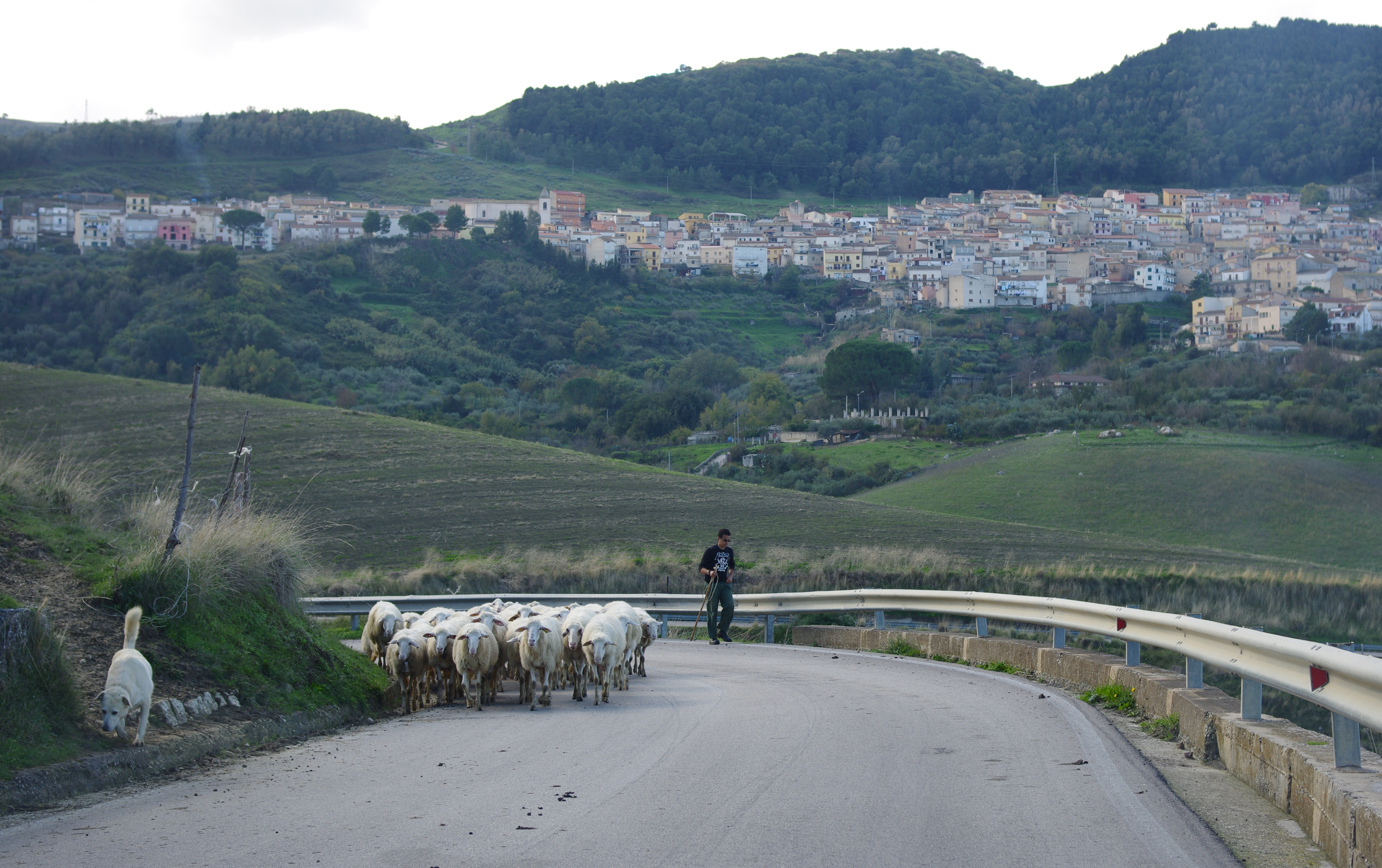
- Landscape of Contessa Entellina

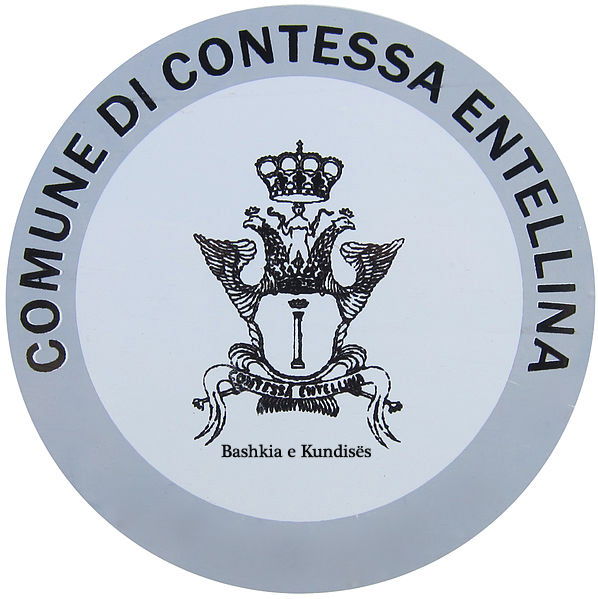

- Location within Italy Location within Sicily
- Coordinates: 37°44′N 13°11′E
- Country: Italy
- Region: Sicily
- Metropolitan city: Palermo (PA)

Government
  - Mayor: Leonardo Spera

Area
  - Total: 136.48 km^{2} (52.70 sq mi)
- Elevation: 571 m (1,873 ft)

Population (30 June 2017)
  - Total: 1,721
  - Density: 12.61/km^{2} (32.66/sq mi)
- Demonym: Contessioti
- Time zone: UTC+1 (CET)
  - Summer (DST): UTC+2 (CEST)
- Postal code: 90030
- Dialing code: 091
- Patron saint: Saint Nicholas of Myra
- Saint day: December 6
- Website: Official website

Contessa Entellina (Albanian: Kuntisa) is a small comune in the Metropolitan City of Palermo, in Sicily, southern Italy.

Is located in the "Valle del Belìce" at 571 metres (1,873 ft) above sea level in the mountains called Brinjat, is situated 80 km from Palermo. The country, along with Piana degli Albanesi and Santa Cristina Gela, is among the three ethnic communities of Arbëreshë of Sicily, who still speak Albanian, carefully preserve the Italo-Albanian Catholic tradition, the Albanian costumes, musical and gastronomic traditions of the ancient Albania.

== History ==
The foundation is attributed to about 1450 on the ruins of a remote farmhouse seniority, the "Comitissa", but the chapter officers, the granting of fiefs, were built in 1520, when he started the rebuilding, upgrading and restocking of Albanians from Albania and subsequently also by the southern Morea, from Albanian communities where they lived from 1300.

In ancient times it was near them the ancient Elymian city of Entella, in fact, with the discovery of archaeological ancient site, to give relief to the old site, you would add the name of the country, even the term Entella.

Today Contessa Entellina keeps the Albanian language, the culture of their ancestors, and holds the Byzantine rite; but lives a very difficult period. From earthquake of Belice to date have followed many migrations, halving the population and depopulating the city center, the Albanian language is also taught to fewer and fewer young people so the community is constantly lost and the identity is dying.

== Demographics ==
Historical population

Year	Pop.	±%
1861	3,364	—
1871	3,285	−2.3%
1881	3,293	+0.2%
1901	2,646	−19.6%
1911	2,117	−20.0%
1921	1,911	−9.7%
1931	2,301	+20.4%
1936	2,597	+12.9%

Year	Pop.	±%
1951	2,894	+11.4%
1961	2,669	−7.8%
1971	2,207	−17.3%
1981	2,041	−7.5%
1991	2,052	+0.5%
2001	1,985	−3.3%
2011	1,865	−6.0%
2021	1,529	−18.0%

Source: ISTAT

== People ==
- Nicola Chetta (1741–1803), Byzantine-Greek rite priest, ethnographic, writer and poet.
- Antonino Cuccia (1850–1938), popular poet whose work represents an important testimony of Arbëresh spoken in Contessa Entellina.
- Vaccaro brothers
- Leonardo Lala (1906–2000), writer and expert on Arbëreshë language, history, and folk traditions.
- Giuseppe Schirò (junior)
- Matteo Sciambra (1914–1967), Byzantine rite priest, university professor and writer, whose work focuses on the study of Arbëresh and on the preservation of the Byzantine liturgical heritage of the Arbëreshë communities in Sicily.
- Bino (singer) (1953–2010), pop singer

== See also ==
- Albania
- Byzantine Rite
- Eparchy of Piana degli Albanesi
- George Kastrioti Skanderbeg
