= Giuseppe Salvatore Bellusci =

Italian politician

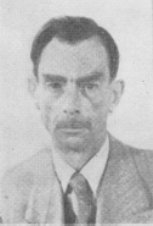
Giuseppe Salvatore Bellusci

Giuseppe Salvatore Bellusci (31 May 1888 – 26 December 1972) was an Italian politician of Arbëresh descent.

Bellusci (Bellushi) was born in San Demetrio Corone. He represented the Italian Republican Party in the Constituent Assembly of Italy from 1946 to 1948.

== Bibliography ==
- Info

https://www.ferentino.org/personaggi/epoca-moderna/giuseppe-salvatore-bellusci/
