= Santa Cristina Gela =

Santa Cristina Gela Sëndahstina
- Comune
- Comune di Santa Cristina Gela; Bashkia e Sëndahstinës
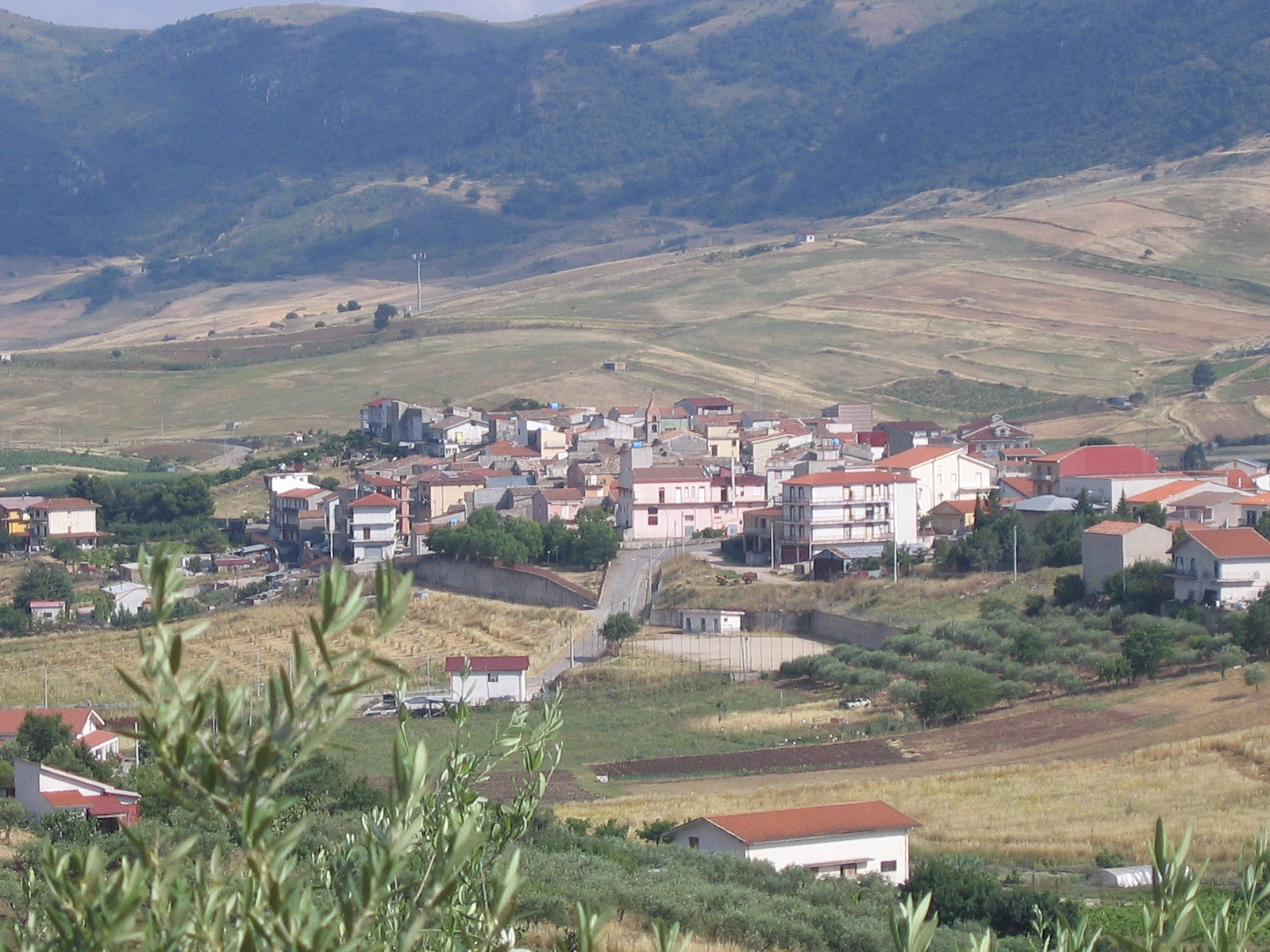
- View of Santa Cristina Gela from a nearby hill

- Coat of arms

- Location within Italy Location within Sicily
- Coordinates: 37°59′N 13°20′E
- Country: Italy
- Region: Sicily
- Metropolitan city: Palermo (PA)
- Frazioni: Altofonte, Belmonte Mezzagno, Marineo, Monreale, Piana degli Albanesi

Government
  - Mayor: Giuseppe Cangialosi

Area
  - Total: 38 km^{2} (15 sq mi)
- Elevation: 670 m (2,200 ft)

Population (31 December 2010)
  - Total: 927
  - Density: 24/km^{2} (63/sq mi)
- Demonym: Santacristinesi (Albanian Sëndahstinarë)
- Time zone: UTC+1 (CET)
  - Summer (DST): UTC+2 (CEST)
- Postal code: 90030
- Dialing code: 091
- Patron saint: Saint Cristina
- Saint day: 24 July
- Website: Official website

Santa Cristina Gela (Arberesh: Sëndahstina) is an Arbëreshë village in the Metropolitan City of Palermo in Sicily.

The village, along with Contessa Entellina and Piana degli Albanesi, is one of three Arberesh settlements in Sicily where the Arberesh language is still spoken. It is the smallest and newest Arbëresh settlement in Sicily, founded at the end of the 17th century by settlers from the nearby Piana degli Albanesi (Hora e Arbëreshëvet), which is 3 km away.

Ecclesiastically it belongs to the Byzantine rite Eparchy of Piana degli Albanesi although is a church that uses the Latin rite. It is also the seat of the Union of Albanian Municipalities of Sicily "BESA".

Its inhabitants call themselves Sëndahstinarë and have maintained the Arbëreshë Albanian identity. The municipal administration uses the standard Albanian language in official documents, in accordance with current legislation that protects ethno-linguistic minorities.

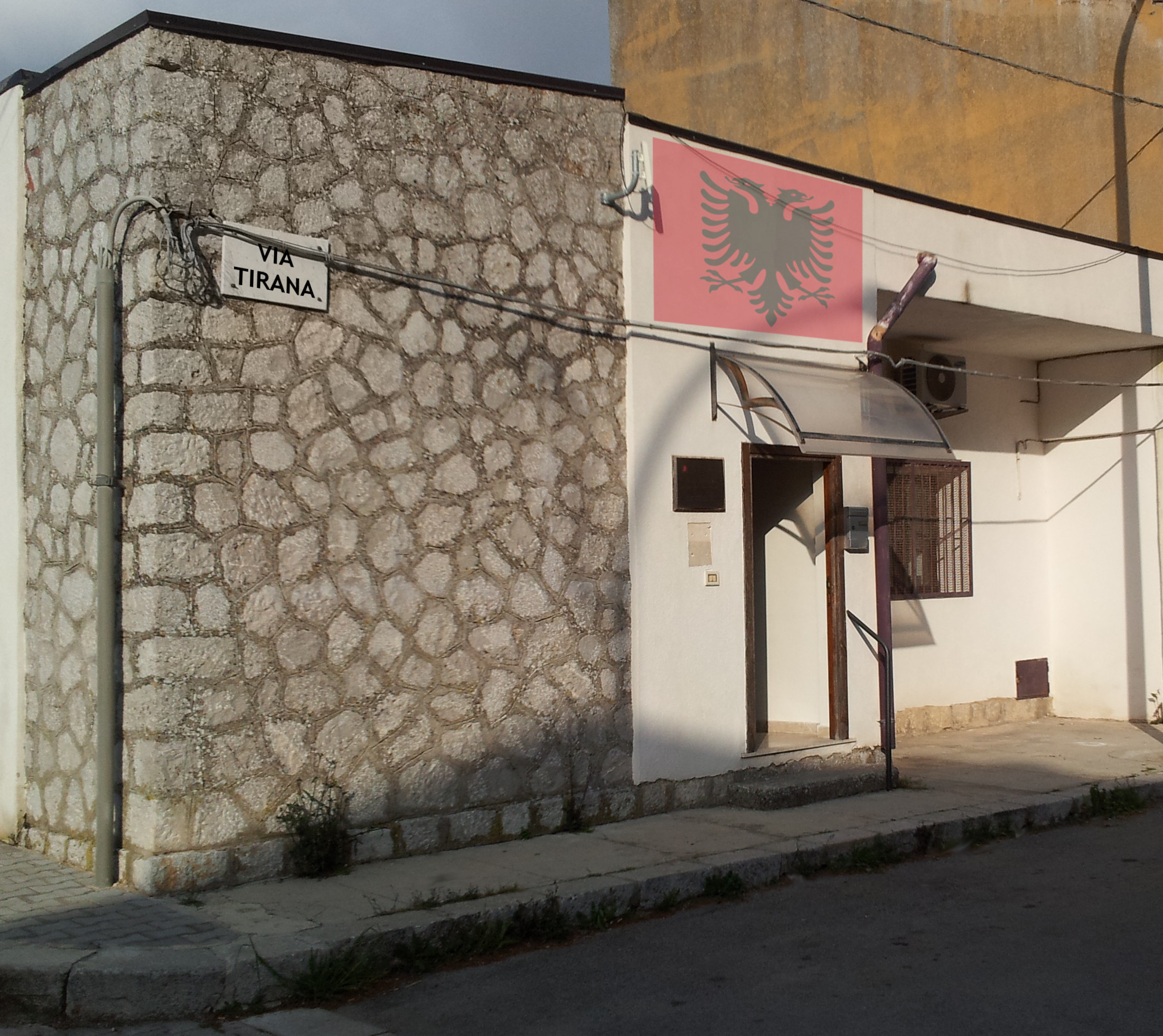
La sede locale dell'Unione dei Comuni Albanesi di Sicilia "BESA" in Via Tirana

== History ==
Santa Cristina Gela was founded in 1691 by 82 descendants of the earlier Albanian settlers from Piana degli Albanesi, specifically from the Musacchia family from Myzeqe plain in Albania, and various families of Arvanite Nobility from Morea. The settlers acquired the area under a contract with the Archbishop of Palermo and had to pay to him feudal rights for some public services, although they were granted tax exemptions and private buildings rights.

Santa Cristina Gela was originally called Santa Cristina. The name Gela was affixed in honour of the Naselli family, princes of Sant'Elia (part of Santa Flavia) and dukes of Gela, who owned vast territories in the area of the village.

The modern territory of Santa Cristina Gela was created from the unification of three earlier feudal principalities: the fiefs of Santa Cristina, Turdiepi and Pianetto. The territory of the latter is rich in vineyards and olive groves and in more recent times has become a residential area and a holiday destination.

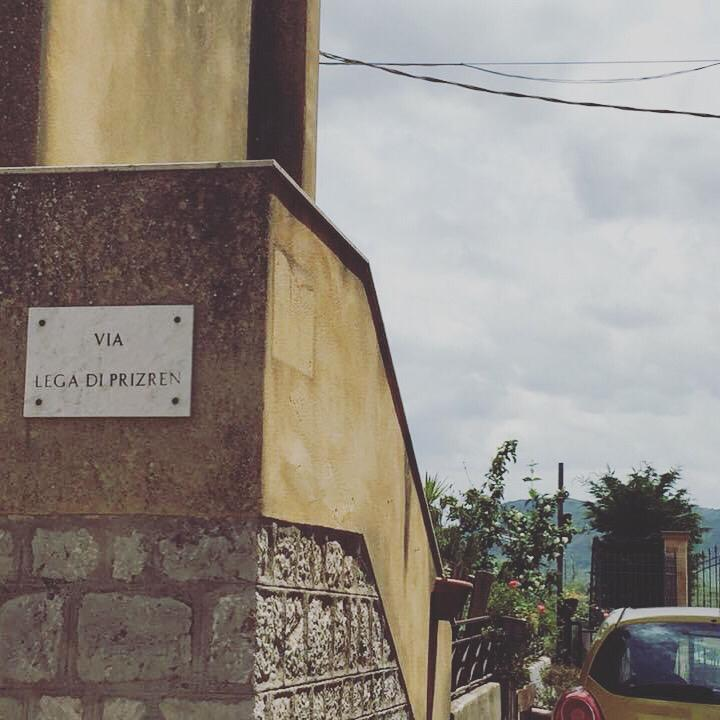
Via League of Prizren in Santa Cristina

== Notable people ==
Giuseppe Arcoleo (1825-1875), son of Papàs Gaetano, the last priest of the Byzantine rite, ophthalmic doctor and director of the Eye Clinic of the University of Palermo.

Francesco Musacchia (1852-1931), descendant of the Muzaka family and founder of the Albanian National League in 1902, part of the League of Prizren later the Italo-Albanian League of Palermo, who made contributions to the chancelleries of the European states in favor of the movement for the independence of Albania from the Ottoman Empire.

Giuseppe Chiaramonte Musacchia (1946-2024), librarian and albanologist.

Martin Di Maggio (1981), sociolinguist who promotes the Arbëresh language.

== Architecture ==
Palazzo Musacchia

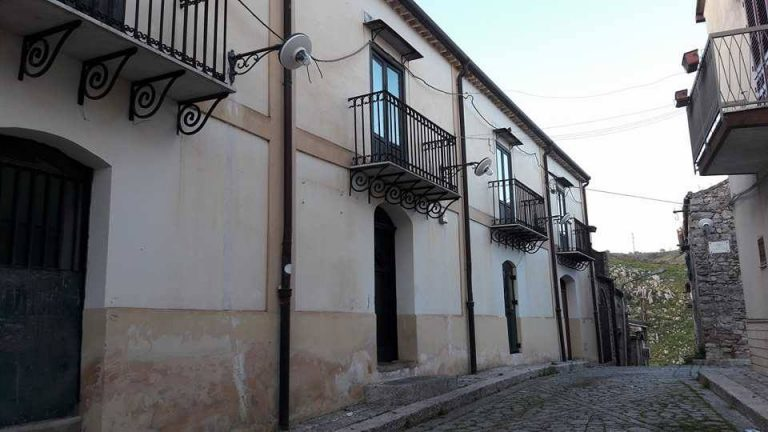
Palazzo Musacchia

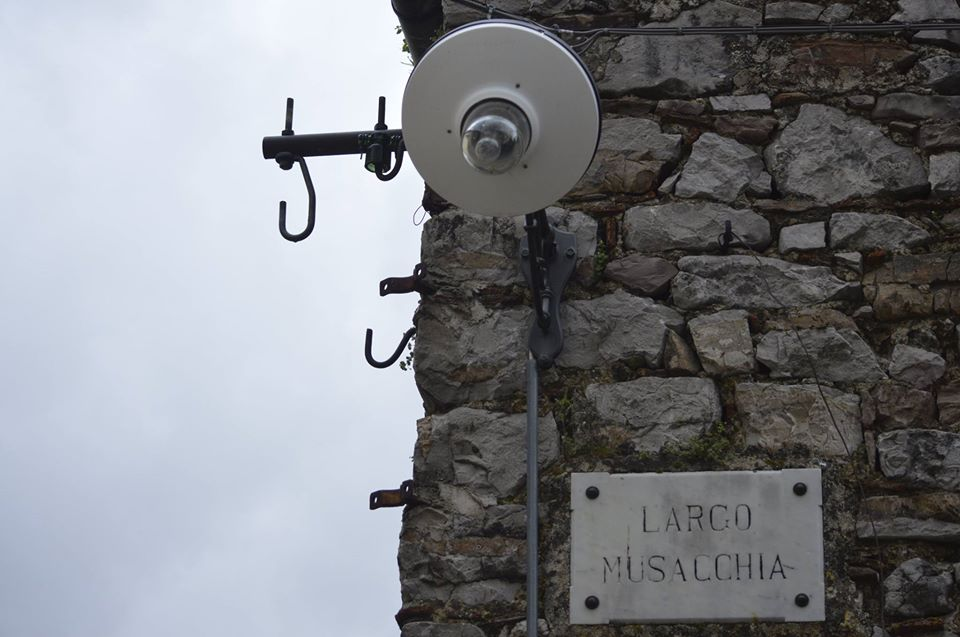
Largo Musacchia

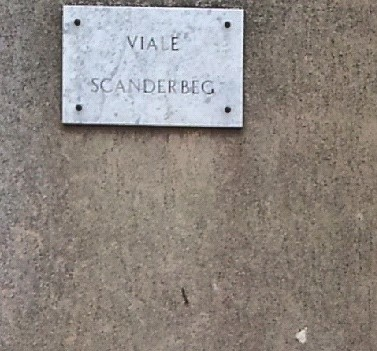
Viale Scanderbeg

Is the mansion belonging to the Albanian noble Muzaka family, it was the seat of the Municipality of Santa Cristina Gela. It has been declared of historical interest and has recently been restored. It is of simple construction with two floors above ground, the façade on Largo Musacchia Street is simple, consisting of four doors with round arches and four balconies on the upper floor, and is rhythmically marked vertically by gray downspouts, while horizontally it is enclosed by a frame formed by the drips of the tiles. In the lower part of the block above the Magaseno house and in continuation of the Musacchia houses there is a small terrace with railings and masonry columns from which the rural landscape is visible. It currently houses the municipal library and is the venue for cultural events.

== Food ==
Santa Cristina Gela is a traditional agricultural and culinary producing village, its production of wood cooked bread is famed and is exported to the adjacent municipalities. Other local products are the cheeses- (gjizë, udhos, and kashkaval, milanizë is also a local favourite). Sweets, such as "kanojët" and meat from local farms (particularly the sausage with fennel seeds- likëngë).

== Language ==
Linguistically Santa Cristina Gela's native population utilise translanguaging as their dominant language practice, drawing on the Arbërisht Albanian, Sicilian and the Italian language. The younger generations receive no schooling in their language and there is no media coverage, and unlike in Piana degli Albanesi there is no linguistic landscape; meaning no visibility and salience of the language on public and commercial signs in the village.

== Toponyms ==
The longstanding presence of the arbëresh language is evident in the rural toponymy, which apart from a few macro toponyms in Siculo-Arabic are almost all in Arbëresh of Albanian etymology:

- Rehjet, hillocks
- Rahji i Shportës, Shporta's Hillock from Shporta (an original Albanian family)
- Guri i Korbit, Crow Stone
- Gropa e Moghës, Apple Valley
- Fusha e Koghës, Plain of Nicholas
- Ninmadhi, Nino the Grand
- Lëmi i Gharajës, Garaia Farmyard (pertaining to the Schirò family)

== Festivals ==
Kalivari, Carnival: in the days following the Epiphany up to Shrove Tuesday. During this time, the young boys dressed in masks used to go around the streets of the town stopping from time to time to dance at the homes of citizens who made themselves available.

Sunjusepi, Saint Joseph's Day, March 19. The Bread of St. Joseph, 'buka e Sunjusepit' is prepared: bread of various shapes decorated with white icing on the surface and a sprig of rosemary. The families who make it promise to the Saint (ja kanë taksur), and it is distributed, after the blessing of the parish priest, to the inhabitants and guests. In the evening the statue of the saint is carried in procession through the streets of the town. The feast is organized by the congregation of San Giuseppe, the oldest in the town, founded at the end of the eighteenth century.

Kreshmët, Lent: on the evening of the Friday before Holy Week, "Java and Madhe", also the eve of the resurrection of Lazarus, according to the calendar of the Byzantine Church, the young people used to sing the Song of Lazarus in Arberesh in the streets of the town, a poetic composition in Albanian, dating back, as a written text, to the 18th century. This is a begging song according to the current ethnographic classification. In fact, the song ends with a verse of egg request. These will be coloured red and distributed on Easter Sunday. On Good Friday, 'Prëmtja e Madhe' , the Song of the Passion of The Virgin is sung in Sicilian with the same modality. On the Friday and Saturday before Easter 'Pashkët' the children usually invite the population to visit the Dead Christ in the church, chanting 'jicni te klisha se Krishti ë vdekur' - "Go to the church as Christ is dead" waving 'çokullat' - wooden tablets that emit a sound to replace the bells as a sign of mourning.

Pashkët, Easter: Since 1890 the Easter liturgy has followed the Roman tradition instead of the Byzantine church rite. On Easter day red eggs, 'vetë e kuqe' and shortbread cakes in the shape of a basket with the red egg 'panaret' are prepared.

Shën Gjergji, St. George's Day: The uninterrupted link with Piana degli Albanesi over the centuries manifests itself on this occasion with a morning pilgrimage from Santa Cristina Gela to the church of St. George in Piana. The translation of the simulacrum of the Great Martyr.

Shëmbria e Tajavisë, la Madonna di Tagliavia: on the occasion of this festival between May and June, at the Ascension, the inhabitants go on a pilgrimage to the Sanctuary of the Most Holy Mary of the Rosary of Tagliavia which is about 15 km away.

Sënda Hstina, St. Christina Megalomartyr of Bolsena: the main festival of the village on July 24 lasting for several days. For this occasion the Bishop of the Eparchy of Piana degli Albanesi visits the community and the religious celebration culminates with the procession of the statue of the Saint through the streets of the town. The community organizes cultural events, music, shows, food festivals and fireworks that close the festivities.

Makughata, Immaculate Conception: 8 December, animated by the sisters of the Congregation of the Immaculate who, at the end of the statue's procession, organize a famous draw in which all the participants participate. In the evening, it is customary to dine with sfinçun.

Nataghet, Christmas: for the Christmas period each family makes the typical sweets known in Sicilian as Buccellato and in the arbëreshe communities with the name of 'të plotit' , literally 'stuffed' , filled with pasta of almonds or fig jam.

== See also ==
- Arbëreshë
- Byzantine Rite
- Eparchy of Piana degli Albanesi
- Gjergj Kastrioti Skenderbeu
