= Tarsia =

Tarsia Greek: Tharsías
- Comune
- Comune di Tarsia
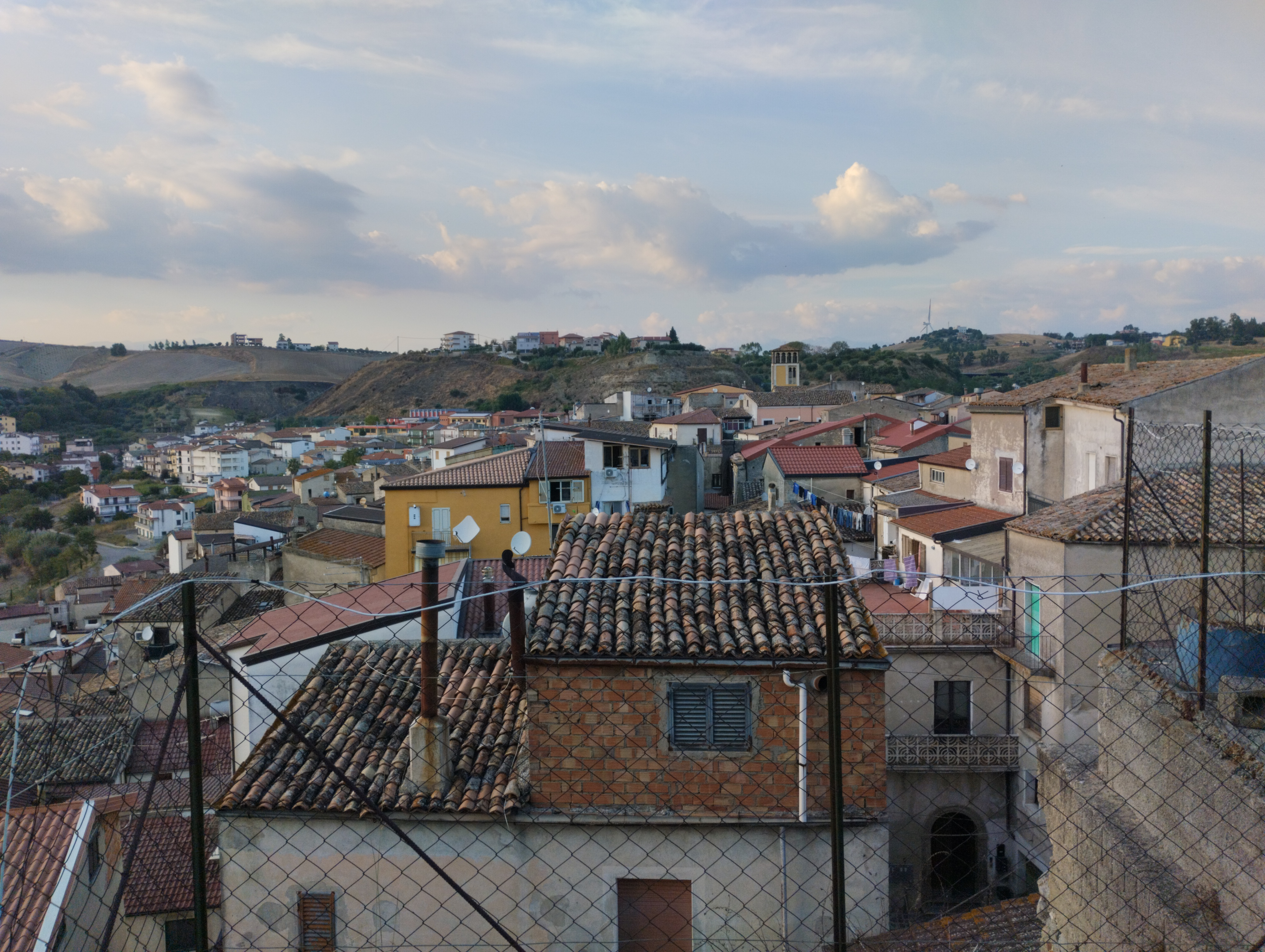

- Location within Italy Location within Calabria
- Coordinates: 39°37′N 16°16′E
- Country: Italy
- Region: Calabria
- Province: Cosenza (CS)

Government
  - Mayor: Roberto Ameruso

Area
  - Total: 48.28 km^{2} (18.64 sq mi)
- Elevation: 192 m (630 ft)

Population (2007)
  - Total: 2,272
  - Density: 47.06/km^{2} (121.9/sq mi)
- Demonym: Tarsiani or Tarsioti
- Time zone: UTC+1 (CET)
  - Summer (DST): UTC+2 (CEST)
- Postal code: 87040
- Dialing code: 0981
- ISTAT code: 078145
- Patron saint: St. Francis of Paola
- Saint day: Last Sunday in May
- Website: Official website

Tarsia is a town and comune in the province of Cosenza in the Calabria region of southern Italy. The ancient town of Caprasia is thought to be the modern Tarsia.

== Geography ==
The municipality borders with Bisignano, Corigliano Calabro, Roggiano Gravina, San Demetrio Corone, San Lorenzo del Vallo, San Marco Argentano, Santa Sofia d'Epiro, Spezzano Albanese and Terranova da Sibari.

== History ==
During World War II, Benito Mussolini built Italy's largest fascist concentration camp there, the Ferramonti internment camp. Imprisoned there were mainly Jews and ethnic minorities considered as enemies by the fascist regime. The camp was liberated by the British on September 14, 1943.

== See also ==
- Ferramonti di Tarsia
