= Giuseppe Schirò =

Giuseppe Schirò may refer to:

- Giuseppe Schirò (bishop) (1690–1769), archbishop of Durazzo
- Giuseppe Schirò Junior (1905–1984), Arbëreshë writer
- Giuseppe Schirò (poet) (1865–1927), Arbëreshë writer, publicist, and activist of the Albanian National Awakening
- Giuseppe Schirò Di Maggio (born 1944), writer
- Giuseppe Schirò, author of the 1834 paper Rapporti tra l'Epiro e il Regno delle due Sicilie, see Giuseppe Crispi
