= Caprasia =

Ancient town of Bruttium

Caprasia was an ancient town of Bruttium, placed by the Itineraries on the road from Muranum to Consentia (modern Cosenza), at a distance of 28 miles from the latter city. (Itin. Ant. pp. 105, 110; Tabula Peutingeriana) It is probably the modern Tarsia (in the Province of Cosenza, Calabria, Italy), on the left bank of the Crathis (modern Crati), about the required distance from Cosenza.
