= Mike Mareen =

German singer, songwriter and musician (born 1949)

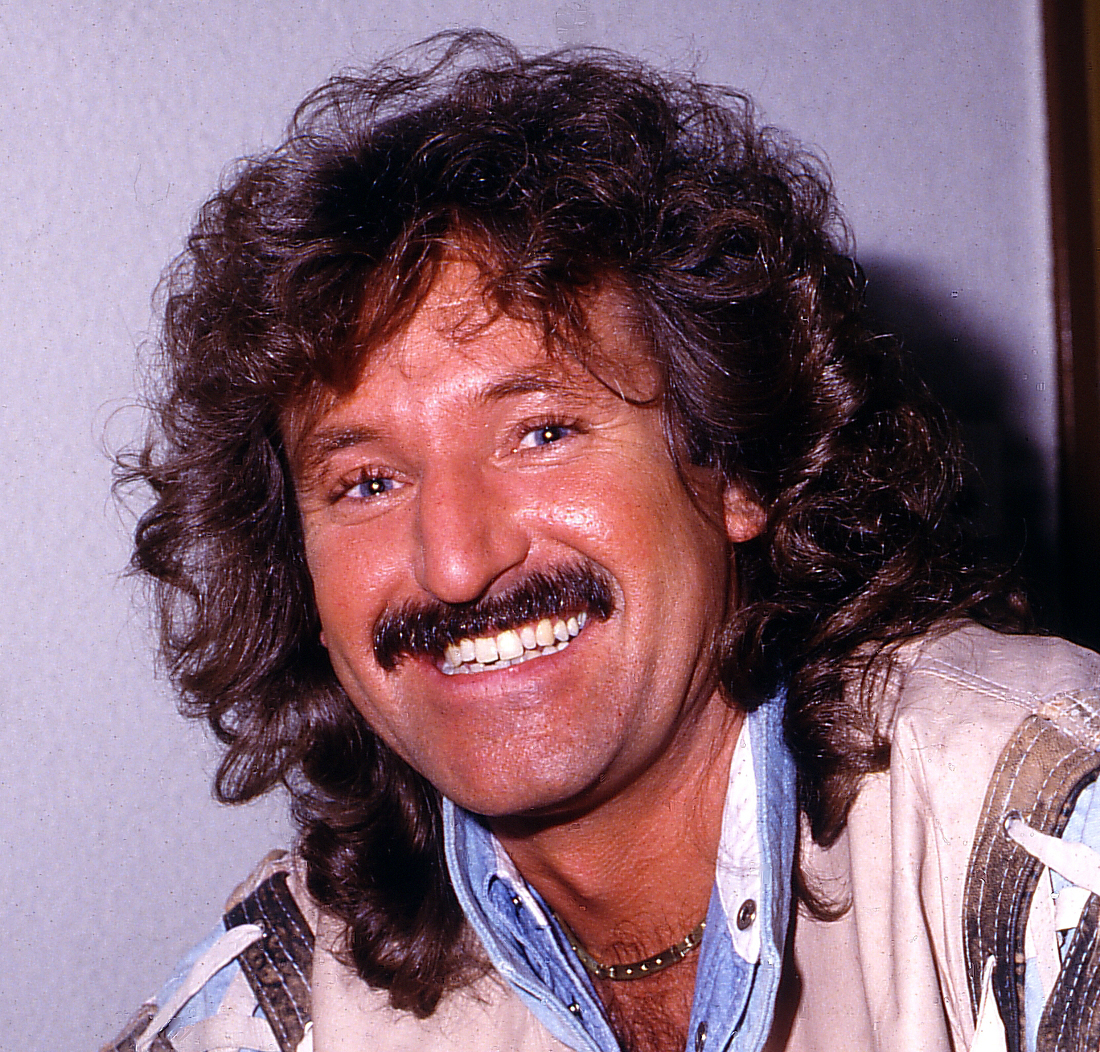
- Wischhoff in 1987
- Born: Uwe-Michael Wischhoff; 9 November 1949 (age 76); West Berlin, West Germany
- Occupations: Singer; songwriter; musician
- Musical career
- Genres: Eurodisco; Italo Disco; hi-NRG; electronic; experimental
- Instruments: Vocals; drums
- Label: ZYX

Uwe-Michael Wischhoff (born 9 November 1949), known by his stage name Mike Mareen, is a German singer, songwriter and musician.

His first musical success was with the band Cemetery Institution who played at Hamburg's Star-Club. Mareen later became a merchant sailor, a job which eventually took him to New York City where he played with several American groups. Upon his return to Europe, Mareen became involved with the production of Euro disco records. During the 1980s, he had some considerable success, with frequent television appearances in Germany and Eastern Europe. His biggest hits were "Dancing In The Dark" (1984) and "Love Spy" (1986). His single "Agent of Liberty" peaked at No. 27 on the German charts in February 1986 "Love Spy" peaked at No. 16 in Germany in September 1986. and at No. 98 in Australia in December 1986

== Discography ==
=== Albums ===
- 1979 - Mike Mareen 70's
- 1985 - Dance Control
- 1986 - Love Spy
- 1987 - Let's Start Now
- 1988 - Synthesizer Control
- 2000 - TV Talk 2000
- 2004 - Darkness & Light

=== Compilations ===
- 1998 - The Best of Mike Mareen

== Sources ==
- Schubert, Rainer (2007). Der Lüneburg-Sound. Landeszeitung für die Lüneburger Heide GmbH. ISBN 978-3-922639-12-1.
- Kent, David (1993). Australian Chart Book 1970–1992 (illustrated ed.). London: N.S.W.: Australian Chart Book. p. 192. ISBN 0-646-11917-6.
