= Santa Sofia d'Epiro =

Santa Sofia d'Epiro Arbëreshë Albanian: Shën Sofia e Epirit
- Comune
- Comune di Santa Sofia d'Epiro
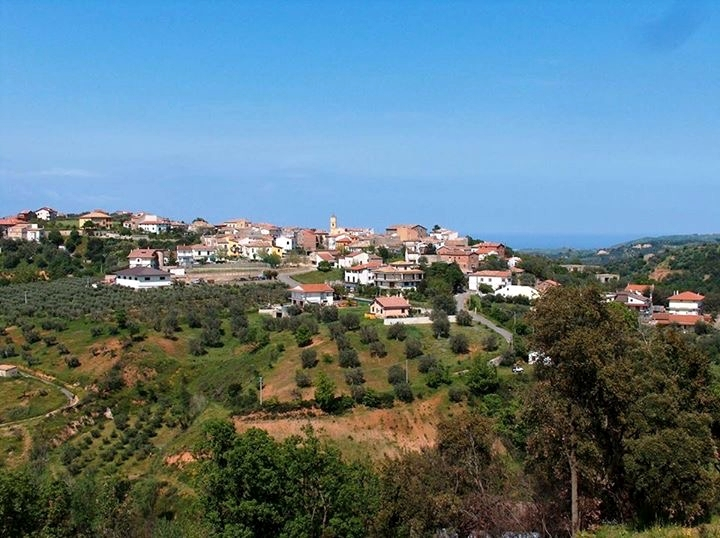

- Coat of arms

- Location within Italy Location within Calabria
- Coordinates: 39°33′N 16°20′E
- Country: Italy
- Region: Calabria
- Province: Cosenza (CS)

Government
  - Mayor: Daniele Atanasio Sisca

Area
  - Total: 39.22 km^{2} (15.14 sq mi)
- Elevation: 558 m (1,831 ft)

Population (31 August 2018)
  - Total: 2,500
  - Density: 64/km^{2} (170/sq mi)
- Demonym: Sofioti (Albanese: Shënsofjotë)
- Time zone: UTC+1 (CET)
  - Summer (DST): UTC+2 (CEST)
- Postal code: 87048
- Dialing code: 0984
- Website: Official website

Santa Sofia d'Epiro (Arbëreshë Albanian: Shën Sofia e Epirit) is an Arbëresh town and comune in the province of Cosenza in the Calabria region of southern Italy.

The town is bordered by Acri, Bisignano, San Demetrio Corone and Tarsia.

== People ==
- Angelo Masci (1758–1821), writer
