= San Benedetto Ullano =

- Comune
- Comune di San Benedetto Ullano
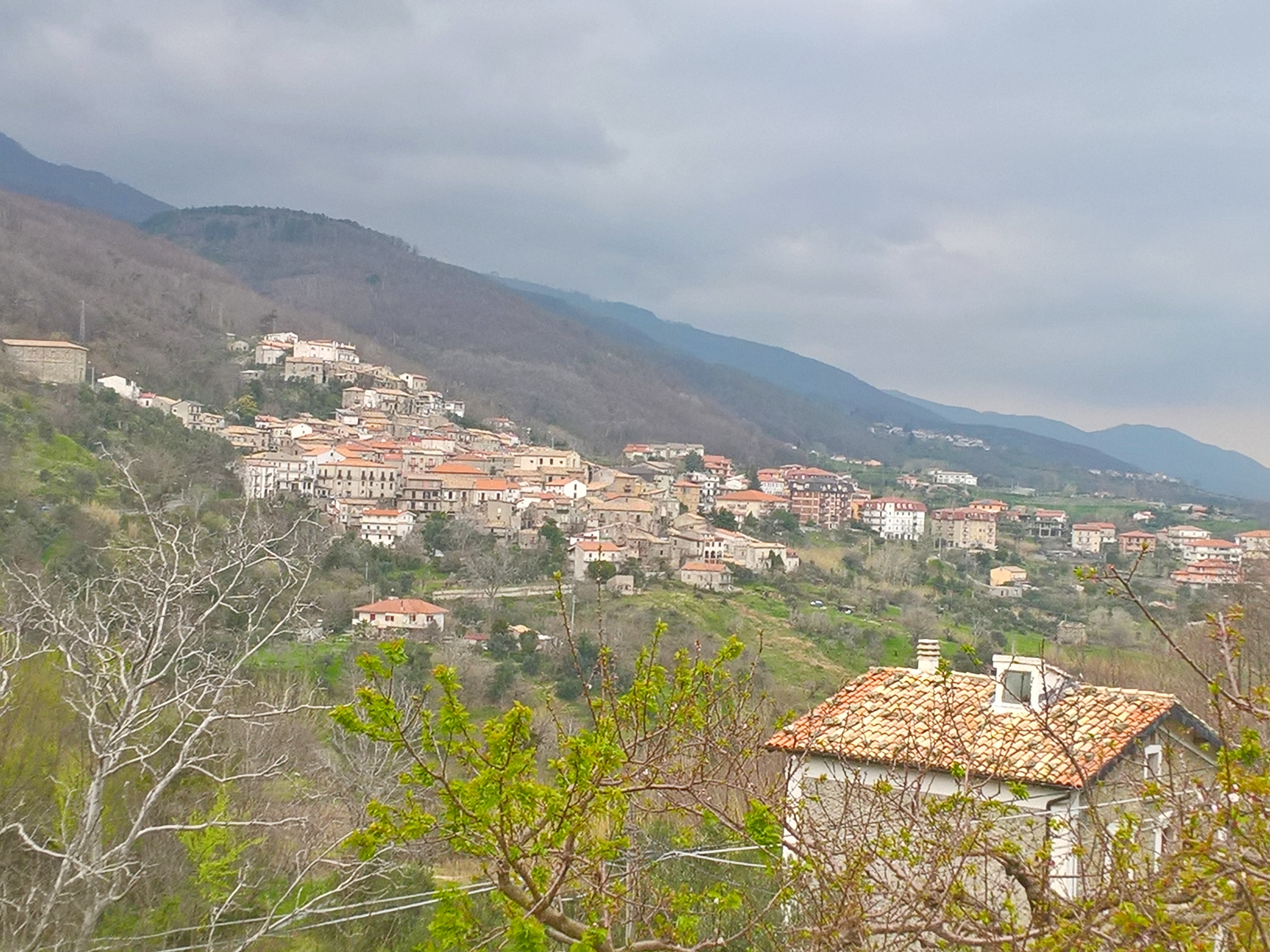

- Location within Italy Location within Calabria
- Coordinates: 39°26′N 16°7′E
- Country: Italy
- Region: Calabria
- Province: Cosenza (CS)
- Frazioni: Marri

Government
  - Mayor: Rosaria Amalia Capparelli

Area
  - Total: 19.57 km^{2} (7.56 sq mi)
- Elevation: 460 m (1,510 ft)

Population (31 July 2018)
  - Total: 1,509
  - Density: 77.11/km^{2} (199.7/sq mi)
- Demonym: Sanbenedettesi
- Time zone: UTC+1 (CET)
  - Summer (DST): UTC+2 (CEST)
- Postal code: 87040
- Dialing code: 0984
- Website: Official website

San Benedetto Ullano (Arbëreshë Albanian: Shën Benedhiti) is an Arbëreshë town and comune in the province of Cosenza in the Calabria region of southern Italy.
