= San Cosmo Albanese =

San Cosmo Albanese Strigàri
- Comune
- Comune di San Cosmo Albanese
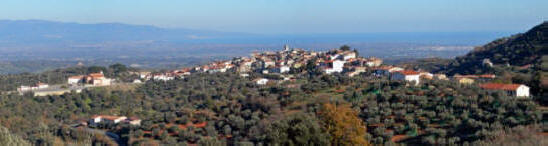

- Coat of arms

- Location within Italy Location within Calabria
- Coordinates: 39°35′N 16°25′E
- Country: Italy
- Region: Calabria
- Province: Cosenza (CS)
- Frazioni: Campanaro, Matermare

Government
  - Mayor: Damiano Baffa

Area
  - Total: 11.57 km^{2} (4.47 sq mi)
- Elevation: 407 m (1,335 ft)

Population (31 July 2018)
  - Total: 590
  - Density: 51/km^{2} (130/sq mi)
- Demonym(s): Strigajot, Sancosmitani
- Time zone: UTC+1 (CET)
  - Summer (DST): UTC+2 (CEST)
- Postal code: 87060
- Dialing code: 0983
- Patron saint: Sts. Cosmas and Damian
- Saint day: 27 September
- Website: Official website

San Cosmo Albanese (Arbëreshë Albanian: Strigàri; Calabrian: San Cuòsimu) is a village and comune in the province of Cosenza in the Calabria region of southern Italy.

In the territory of the current village a tiny rural settlement called Santo Cosma, formerly dependent on the local Basilian monastery, existed prior to the arrival of Albanians. Following the collapse of Albanian resistance to the Ottoman Empire, Albanian Christians migrated to Italy and settled in the village. As a result, today the village is home to an Arbëresh community.

== People ==
- Giuseppe Serembe, writer, poet
- Terenzio Tocci, politician
