= San Giorgio Albanese =

- Comune
- Comune di San Giorgio Albanese
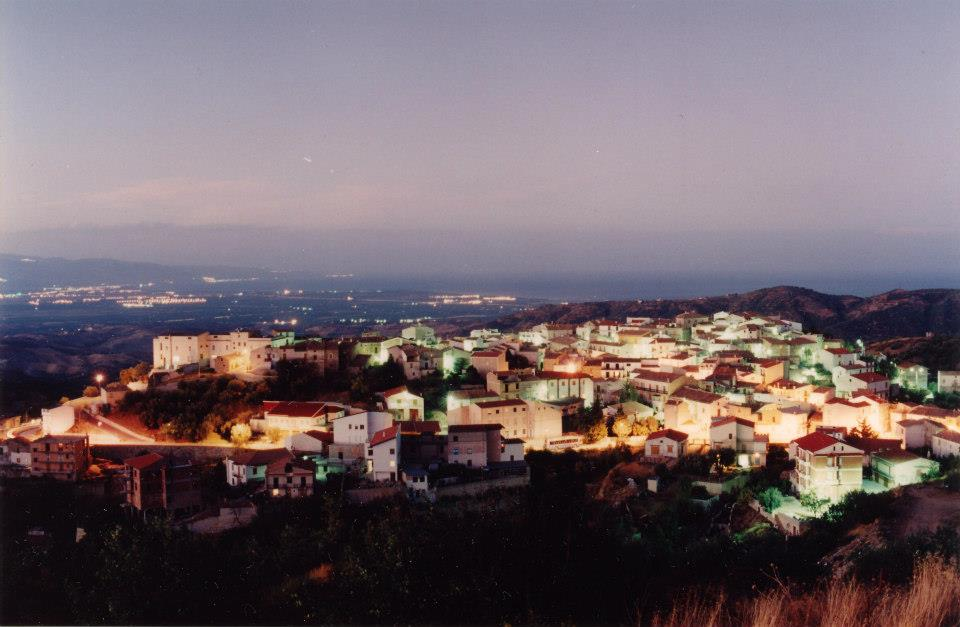

- Location within Italy Location within Calabria
- Coordinates: 39°34′N 16°27′E
- Country: Italy
- Region: Calabria
- Province: Cosenza (CS)
- Frazioni: Colucci, Palombara, Pantanello

Government
  - Mayor: Gianni Gabriele

Area
  - Total: 22.68 km^{2} (8.76 sq mi)
- Elevation: 420 m (1,380 ft)

Population (31 December 2015)
  - Total: 1,432
  - Density: 63.14/km^{2} (163.5/sq mi)
- Demonym: Sangiorgesi
- Time zone: UTC+1 (CET)
  - Summer (DST): UTC+2 (CEST)
- Postal code: 87060
- Dialing code: 0983
- Patron saint: St. George
- Saint day: 23 April
- Website: Official website

San Giorgio Albanese (Arbëreshë Albanian: Mbuzati) is a town and comune in the province of Cosenza in the Calabria region of southern Italy.

It is one of the Arbëreshë towns in southern Italy.

== People ==
- Jul Variboba, writer
