= Arbëresh language =

Albanian linguistic varieties of Italy

Arbëresh
- Arbërisht
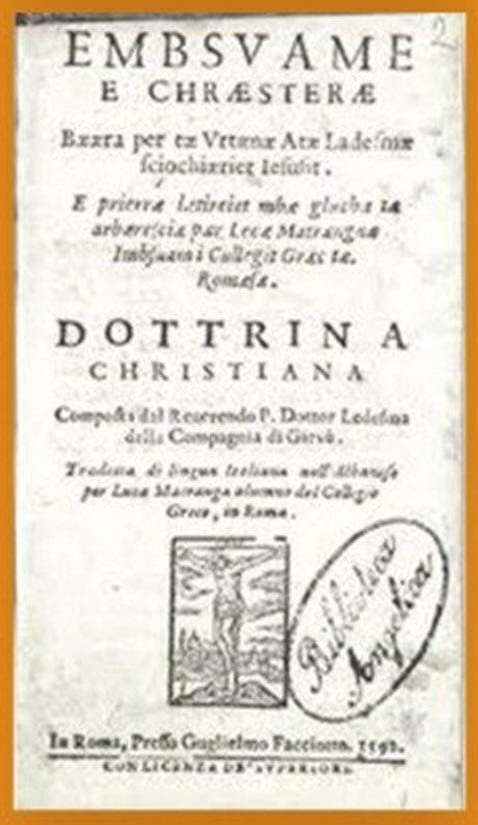
- E Mbësuame e Krështerë / La Dottrina Cristiana Albanese (The Albanian Christian Doctrine), Piana degli Albanesi – Rome 1592. By Luca Matranga
- Pronunciation: [ˌaɾbəˈɾiʃt]
- Native to: Italy
- Region: Abruzzo, Apulia, Basilicata, Calabria, Campania, Molise, Sicily
- Ethnicity: Arbëreshë
- Native speakers: 70,000-100,000
- Language family: Indo-European: Albanoid; Albanian; Tosk; Southern; Arbëresh
- Dialects: Apulian Albanian; Calabrian Albanian; Campo Marino Albanian; Central Mountain Albanian; Sicilian Albanian
- Writing system: Latin

Language codes
- ISO 639-3: aae
- Glottolog: arbe1236
- ELP: Arbëreshë
- Linguasphere: 55-AAA-ah
- Distribution of Albanian language dialects

- Arbëresh is classified as Definitely Endangered by the UNESCO Atlas of the World's Languages in Danger.

Arbëresh (gluha/gjuha/gjufa Arbëreshe; also known as Arbërisht, Italian: Arberesco, Lingua Albanese d'Italia, Italo-albanese) comprises the Albanian linguistic varieties spoken by the Arbëreshë people of Italy, brought there by several migratory waves of Albanians from Albania and Greece since the Late Middle Ages. Arbëresh varieties are derived from the old Tosk Albanian varieties spoken in the south-western Balkans, and throughout the centuries they have developed in Italy in contact with the neighboring Italo-Romance-speaking communities. Other Tosk Albanian varieties from the Late Middle Ages referred to as Arvanitika (endonym: arbërisht) are spoken in Greece by the Arvanites. E Mbësuame e Krështerë (1592) by Luca Matranga from Piana degli Albanesi is the earliest known Old Tosk text, a translation of a catechism book from Latin.

The Arbëreshë people are bilingual, also speaking Italian. Arbëresh is classified as Definitely Endangered by the UNESCO Atlas of the World's Languages in Danger. While Italian law protects the language and culture of the Albanian people in Italy, the language taught at school and university is Standard Albanian, constituting an issue for the Arbëresh communities' preservation of their native idiom, which has remained separated from the main Albanian-speaking compact area for around 500 years. Alongside the fact that Arbëresh is rarely written, another issue contributing to language attrition is the differentiation between the Albanian varieties used in Italy: the Arbëresh local idioms in some areas are so different from each other that Arbëresh people of those areas use Italian or Standard Albanian as a lingua franca to communicate with each other.

== History ==
Between the 11th and 14th centuries, Albanian-speaking mercenaries from the areas of medieval Albania, Epirus and Morea now Peloponnese, were often recruited by the Franks, Aragonese, Italians and Byzantines.

The invasion of the Balkans by the Ottoman Turks in the 15th century caused large waves of emigration from the Balkans to southern Italy. In 1448, the King of Naples, Alfonso V of Aragon, asked the Albanian noble Skanderbeg to transfer to his service ethnic Albanian mercenaries. Led by Demetrio Reres and his two sons, these men and their families were settled in twelve villages in the Catanzaro area of Calabria. The following year, some of their relatives and other Albanians were settled in four villages in Sicily. In 1459 Ferdinand I of Naples also requested assistance from Skanderbeg. After victories in two battles, a second contingent of Albanians was rewarded with land east of Taranto, in Apulia, where they founded 15 villages. After the death of Skanderbeg (1468), resistance to the Ottomans in Albania came to an end. Subsequently, many Albanians fled to neighbouring countries and some settled in villages in Calabria.

There was a constant flow of ethnic Albanians into Italy into the 16th century, and other Albanian villages were formed on Italian soil. The new immigrants often took up work as mercenaries with Italian armies. For instance, between 1500 and 1534, Albanians from central Greece were employed as mercenaries by Venice, to evacuate its colonies in the Peloponnese, as the Turks invaded. Afterwards these troops reinforced defences in southern Italy against the threat of Turkish invasion. They established self-contained communities, which enabled their distinct language and culture to flourish. Arbëreshë, as they became known, were often soldiers for the Kingdom of Naples and the Republic of Venice, between the 16th and 19th centuries.

Despite an Arbëreshë cultural and artistic revival in the 19th century, emigration from southern Italy significantly reduced the population. In particular, migration to the Americas between 1900 and 1940 caused the total depopulation of approximately half of the Arbëreshë villages. The speech community forms part of the highly heterogenous linguistic landscape of Italy, with 12 recognised linguistic minorities Italian state law (law 482/1999). The exact Arbëresh speech population is uncertain, as the Italian national census does not collect data on minority language speakers. This is also further complicated by the Italian state's protection of the Albanian culture and population as a whole and not Arbëresh Albanian specifically. This law theoretically implements specific measures in various fields such as education, communication, radio, press and TV public service, but in the case of the Arberesh community the legal construction of the language as "Albanian" and the community as the "Albanian population" effectively homogenises the language and has not led to adequate provision for the linguistic needs of the communities.

== Classification ==
- Balkanic
  - Armenian
  - Graeco-Albanian
    - Graeco-Phrygian
      - Greek
      - Phrygian
        (extinct)
    - "Illyric"
      - Messapic
        (extinct)
      - Albanian

The Palaeo-Balkanic Indo-European branch based on the chapter "Albanian" (Hyllested & Joseph 2022) in Olander (ed.) The Indo-European Language Family

Arbëresh varieties derive from varieties of Old Tosk Albanian, which were spoken in southern Albania and Greece. They have experienced a similar evolutionary pattern to Arvanitika, the Albanian linguistic varieties spoken in Greece. Arbëresh varieties are spoken in Southern Italy in the regions of Abruzzi, Basilicata, Calabria, Campania, Molise, Apulia and Sicily. The varieties of Arbëresh are closely related to each other but are not always entirely mutually intelligible.

Arbëresh retains many features of medieval Albanian from the time before the Ottoman invasion of Albania in the 15th century. Arbëresh varieties also retain some Greek elements, including vocabulary and pronunciation, most of which they share with Arvanitika varieties. Many of the conservative features of Arbëresh were lost in mainstream Albanian Tosk. For example, it has preserved certain syllable-initial consonant clusters which have been simplified in Standard Albanian (cf. Arbëresh gluhë /ˈɡluxə/ ('language/tongue'), vs. Standard Albanian gjuhë /ˈɟuhə/). Arbëresh most resembles the varieties of Albanian spoken in the southern region of Albania, notably Lab Albanian, as well as Cham Albanian.

Arbëresh was commonly called Albanese ('Albanian' in the Italian language) in Italy until the 1990s. Until the 1980s Arbëresh was mostly a spoken language, except for its written form used in the Italo-Albanian Byzantine Church, and Arbëreshë people had no practical connection with the Standard Albanian language – which was unified as a mainly Gheg-based standard from 1908 to 1969, and as a mainly Tosk-based standard from 1969 – as they did not use the standard Albanian form of writing.

Since the 1980s, some efforts have been organized to preserve the cultural and linguistic heritage of the language.

Arbëresh has been replaced by local Romance languages and by Italian in several villages, and in others is experiencing contact-induced language shift. Many scholars have produced language learning materials for communities, including those by Giuseppe Schirò Di Maggio, Gaetano Gerbino, Matteo Mandalà, Zef Chiaramonte.

Varieties of Albanian

The Arbëresh local idioms in some areas are so different from each other that Arbëresh people of those areas use Italian or Standard Albanian as lingua franca to communicate with each other.

=== Language or dialect ===
Arbëresh language beside medieval mainland Tosk Albanian is also descended from Arvanitika which evolved separately from other forms of Albanian since the 13th century when its first speakers emigrated to Morea from Southern Albania and Epirus. A dialect is defined linguistically as closely related and, despite their differences, by mutual intelligibility. In the absence of rigorous linguistic intelligibility tests, the claim cannot be made whether one is a dialect or a separate variant of the same language group.

== Varieties ==
The varieties of Arbëresh largely correspond with the regions where they are spoken, while some settlements have distinctive features that result in greater or lesser degrees of mutual intelligibility.

The Siculo-Arbëresh variety is spoken exclusively in the Province of Palermo and in three villages: Piana degli Albanesi, Santa Cristina Gela and Contessa Entellina; while the varieties of Piana and Santa Cristina Gela are similar enough to be entirely mutually intelligible, the variety of Contessa Entellina is not entirely intelligible. Therefore a further dialect within Siculo-Arbëresh known as the Palermitan-Arbëresh variety can be identified, as well as a Cosenza variety, a Basilicata variety, and a Campania variety represented by the speech of one single settlement of Greci. There is also a Molisan-Arbëresh and an Apulio-Arbëresh.

Within the Cosenza Calabrian varieties of Arbëresh, the dialect of Vaccarizzo Albanese is particularly distinct. Spoken in the villages of Vaccarizzo Albanese and San Giorgio Albanese in Calabria by approximately 3,000 people, Vaccarizzo Albanian has retained many archaic features of both Gheg and Tosk dialects.

== Phonology ==
Some features of Arbëresh distinguish it considerably from standard Albanian while also maintaining features still used in other Tosk Albanian dialects. In some cases these are retentions of older pronunciations.

=== Vowels ===
Ë

The letter ⟨Ë⟩ is pronounced as either a mid central vowel [ə] or as a close back unrounded vowel [ɯ]. So the word Arbëresh is pronounced either [ɑɾbəˈɾɛʃ] or [ɑɾbɯˈɾɛʃ] depending on the dialect.

Y to I

Arbëresh lacks the close front rounded vowel [y] of Albanian, which is replaced by the close front unrounded vowel [i]. For example ty ('you') becomes tihj, and hyni ('enter') becomes hini.

=== Consonants ===
GJ, Q

The letters ⟨GJ⟩ and ⟨Q⟩ are pronounced as a palatalized voiced velar plosive [ɡʲ] and a palatalized voiceless velar plosive [kʲ], rather than a voiced palatal plosive [ɟ] and a voiceless palatal plosive [c] as in standard Albanian. E.g. the word gjith ('all') is pronounced [ɡʲiθ] rather than [ɟiθ], qiell ('heaven') is pronounced [kʲiɛx] rather than [ciɛɫ], and shqip ('Albanian') is pronounced [ʃkʲɪp].

GL, KL

In some words, Arbëresh has preserved the consonant clusters /ɡl/ and /kl/. In Standard Albanian these have mostly become the palatal stops gj and q, e.g. glet not gjet ('s/he looks like ... '), klumësht not qumësht ('milk'), and klisha instead of kisha ('church').

H, HJ

The letter ⟨H⟩ is pronounced as a voiceless velar fricative [x]. As such, the Albanian word ha ('eat') is pronounced [xɑ], not [hɑ]. Arbëresh additionally has the palatalized counterpart, [ç]. Therefore, the word hjedh ('throw') is pronounced [çɛθ]. The letter combination ⟨HJ⟩ is present in a few standard Albanian words (without a voiceless velar fricative), but is not treated as a separate letter of the alphabet as it is in Arbëresh.

LL, G, GH

The letters ⟨LL⟩ and ⟨G⟩ are realised as a voiced velar fricative [ɣ]. The vast majority of these words originate in Sicilian, but the sound also occurs in words of Albanian origin. Often ⟨G⟩ when pronounced [ɣ] is replaced by ⟨GH⟩ in the Arbëresh orthography, with ⟨G⟩ in theory reserved for /ɡ/ (although in practice it is inconsistent). This feature is very strong that it is carried over into the Italian speech of inhabitants of Piana degli Albanesi and Santa Cristina Gela in words such as grazie, frigorifero, gallera, magro, gamba etc. which are realised respectively as [ʁratsiɛ], [friɣoˈrifero], [ɣaˈlɛra], [ˈmaɣro], [ˈʁamba] etc. In Piana degli Albanesi the tendency is to treat Italian loanwords differently from Sicilian, which results in the difference between llampjun, pronounced as [ʁampˈjun] (from lampione, 'lamp post'), and lampadhin, pronounced as [lampaˈðin] (from Italian lampadina). In the first example, the ⟨L⟩ becomes ⟨LL⟩ [ʁ] because it comes from Sicilian, whereas in the process of transference from the Italian lampadina to Arbëresh lampadhin, the ⟨l⟩ does not change but the ⟨d⟩ becomes [ð].

Words of Albanian Origin
Written	Pronounced	English
gëzim	[ʁzim]	joy
grish	[ʁriʃ]	invite
llah	[ɣaχ]	eat until stuffed
pagëzim	[paʁˈzim]	baptism

Words of Sicilian Origin
Written	Pronounced
fughurë	[fuɣurə]
fugatjar	[fuɣatˈjar]
garazh	[ɣarˈaʒ]
ghurg	[ɣurɣ]
ghust	[ɣust]
ghuant	[ɣwant]
maghare	[maɣaˈri]

=== Final devoicing of consonants ===
Arbëresh has retained an archaic system of final devoicing of consonants in contrast with Standard Albanian. The consonants that change when in final position or before another consonant are the voiced stops b, d, g, gj; the voiced affricates x, xh; and the voiced fricatives dh, ll, v, z, zh.

Original voiced	b [b]	d [d]	g/gh [ɡ]/[ɣ]	gj [ɡʲ]	x [dz]	xh [dʒ]	dh [ð]	ll [ɣ]	v [v]	z [z]	zh [ʒ]
Devoiced	p [p]	t [t]	k [k]	q [kʲ]	c [ts]	ch [tʃ]	th [θ]	h [x]	f [f]	s [s]	sh [ʃ]

Examples:

- b > p: thelb ('clove') - [θɛlp]
- d > t: Vent ('place') - [vɛnt]
- dh > th: zgledh ('read') - [sklɛθ]
- g > k: lig ('bad') - [lɪk]
- gj > q: zogj ('chicks') - [zɔkʲ]
- j > hj: vaj ('oil') - [vaç]
- ll > h: uthull ('vinegar') - [ʊθʊχ]
- x > c: ndanx ('near') - [ndant͡s]
- z > s: loz ('dance') - [lɔs]
- zh > sh: gozhda ('pin') - [ɣɔʃda]

=== Stress ===
Stress in Arbëresh is usually on the penultimate syllable, as in Italian.

== Morphology ==
In Arbëresh, just like in Tosk, the first person present indicative (e.g. "I work") is marked by the word ending in NJ, whereas in standard Albanian this is normally marked by J.

So, 'I live' is rrónj in Arbëresh and rroj in standard Albanian. The present continuous or gerund differs from Standard Albanian; Arbëresh uses the form jam'e bënj instead of po bej (I am doing).

== Writing system ==
The language is not usually written outside of the church and a few highly educated families, but officials are now using the standard Albanian alphabet, which is used on street signs in villages as well as being taught in schools.

Letter	IPA	Example
a	a	tata
b	b	brënda
c	ts	qaca
ç	tʃ	çë
d	d	ndanx
dh	ð	dhaskal
e	ɛ	rritrenjet
ë	ə / ɯ	mëmë
f	f	falem
g	ɡ	ngë
gh	ɣ	ghua
gj	ɡʲ	gjitonia
h	x / χ (coda)	hora
hj	ç	hjedh
i	i	grish
j	j	jinë
k	k	kloft
l	l̪	lalë
ll	ɣ	llah
m	m	mbatanë
n	n	ngrënit
nj	ɲ	njera
o	ɔ	vova
p	p	pincar
q	kʲ	qiell
r	ɾ	rto
rr	r	rritrat
s	s	sprasmja
sh	ʃ	klumësht
t	t	tihj
th	θ	thelb
u	u	uthull
v	v	vaj
x	dz	xathur
xh	dʒ	xhishu
z	z	zgledh
zh	ʒ	gozhda

== Non-Albanian derived elements ==
=== Vocabulary ===
The adoption of words of ancient Greek origin or of the Koine comes above all from their use in Byzantine religious practices, when the corresponding use in Albanian declined, the "courtly" one of the church was used. The Arberesh use ancient Greek in their liturgies. Thus synonyms are created, such as parkales or lutje for the word "prayer".

Some Arbëresh words appear to be of Koine Greek influence. Examples:

- amáhj [aˈmaç] ('war') < μάχη [ˈmaçi] ('battle').
- haristís [xaɾiˈstis] ('thank') < ευχαριστώ [e̞fˌxariˈsto̞] ('thank you'). Arvanitika uses fharistisem.
- hora [xɔˈɾə] ('village') < χώρα [chóra] ('land, village')
- parkalés [paɾkaˈlɛs] ('I plead', 'please') from παρακαλώ [paˌrakaˈlo̞] ('please').
- hiravol (sheaf, a bundle of harvested crop), < χειρόβολο (χειρ = hand).

Some Arbëresh words appear to be of Albanian Arvanitika which has influenced the current Greek areas since the Middle Ages. Examples:

- dhomat (bundle, pack), < Gr. δεμάτιον.
- argomē (fallow, plowing), < όργωμα. Today surviving in the toponym Argomazit of Piana dei Albanesi.
- kalogreshza (little woman monk), < καλόγρια = woman monk.
- gjitonia (neighbourhood), < γειτονία.
- dhaskal (teacher), < δάσκαλος.

On the Koine Greek elements in the Italo-Albanian dialects see T. Jochalas (1975).

== Archaic Latin-Sicilianisms ==
In the Arbëresh varieties of Sicily and Calabria there are loanwords from the Sicilian language that have crystallized into the Arberesh language matrix at some time in the past but have now mostly disappeared, or evolved in the Romance vocabulary of the local population. This also occurs in other Arberesh varieties outside of Sicily with the local Romance varieties of their communities.

Examples:

- ghranet ('money') < Sic. granna, meaning 'grains'. It is still used in some contexts by modern Sicilian speakers, but in all situations in Arbëresh. Another Arbëresh word for 'money' is haromë, but is no longer used.
- qaca ('square') < Sic. chiazza; used in all Arbëresh dialects as well as Sicilian. The Albanian word sheshi which means 'square' in standard Albanian means 'plateau' in Arbëresh.
- rritrenjet ('toilets') < Norman French via Sic. retained in Arbëresh, but no longer in use in modern Sicilian.
- rritrat ('photograph') < Sic. 'picture' (ritrattu), more common in Arbëresh than in modern Sicilian.
- zdar (to go to the countryside) < Sic. sdari; no longer commonly used in Sicilian.
- zgarrar (to make a mistake; to err) < Sic. sgarrari (now carries a different meaning in Sicilian).

=== Incorporation ===
Alongside the Sicilian vocabulary element in Siculo-Arbëresh, the language also includes grammatical rules for the incorporation of Sicilian-derived verbs in Arbëresh, which differs from the rules concerning Albanian lexical material.

Examples:

- pincar ('think'), originally mendonj – mbanj mend but also mëndinj; derived from the Sicilian 'pinzari'. Which conjugates in the present tense as follows:
- U pincar = I think
- Ti pincar = You think
- Ai/Ajo pincar = He/She thinks
- Na pincarjëm = We think
- Ju pincarni = You (pl) think
- Ata/Ato pincarjën = They think

In the past tense this conjugates as follows:

- U pincarta = I thought
- Ti pincarte = You thought
- Ai/Ajo pincarti = He/She thought
- Na pincartëm = We thought
- Ju pincartët = You (pl.) thought
- Ata/Ato pincartën = They thought

== Contractions ==
M’e tha mua	He told it to me (feminine object)
Ngë m’i tha mua	He did not tell it to me (masculine object)
T’e thom	I tell you it (feminine object)
T’i thom	I tell you it (masculine object)

== Diminutives and augmentatives ==
The Arbëresh diminutive and augmentative system is calqued from Sicilian and takes the form of /-ats(-ɛ)/ = Sic. -azz(u/a); for example "kalac" (cavallone/big horse), and the diminutive takes the form of /-tʃ-ɛl(-ɛ)/ from Sic. /-c-edd(u/a); for example "vajziçele" (raggazzina/little girl). The Arbëresh word for "swear word" is fjalac and comes from a fusion of the Arbëresh word of Albanian etymology: "fjalë" plus the Sicilian augmentative /-azz[a]/ minus the feminine gendered ending /-a/; this calques the Sicilian word palurazza which is cognate with Italian parolaccia.

== Comparison with other forms of Albanian ==
There are many instances in which Arberisht differs greatly from Standard Albanian, for instance:

Arbërisht	Shqip (Standard Albanian)	Meaning
Falem (Falemi if more than one person)	Përshëndetje / Tungjatjeta	Hello
Mirë se na jerdhët / Mirë se vini	Mirë se erdhët	Welcome
Mirëmenat	Mirëmëngjes	Good morning (morning, until noon)
Vjen’ më rarë or vjen më thënë	do të thotë or do me thënë	It means
Bëjëm të shkonj (Piana degli Albanesi)	më le të kaloj	Let me pass
Shkòmë musturën	më jep piperin	Pass me the pepper
Zotërote ë një "zot"?	Zotëri, jeni prift?	Sir, are you a priest?
E ghrish zotërisë satë për një pasjatë	ju ftoj për një shëtitje	I invite you for a stroll
Zglith/djovasë mirë	lexo mirë	Read well
qëroi isht burinë i lik	moti është shumë i keq	The weather is very bad
U rri Sëndahstinë	jetoj në Shën Kristinë	I live in Santa Cristina
Ka bëjëm të ngrënit	do ta gatuajmë ushqimin	We will prepare the food
U ka jecur njera qacës	unë kam ecur tek sheshi	I have walked to the square
Ghajdhuri isht ndë horë/katund	gomari është në katund/fshat	The donkey is into the village
Jam e vete ngulem/flë	unë do të shtrihem/fle	I'm going to sleep
lip ndjesë se zgarrarta/gabova shumë	më fal se gabova shumë	I'm sorry that I've made so many errors
Ajo isht jime shoqe	ajo është gruaja ime/Im shoqe	She is my wife
Flit t'arbrisht	fol shqip	Speak Albanian
Jim shoq isht e ngulet	burri im/Im'shoq është duke fjetur	My husband is sleeping
Më përqen rritëratin tënd	më pëlqen fotografia jote	I like our photograph
Mortatë or motrëmëmë	hallë or tezë	Aunt
Lalë or vovi	xhaxha or Lalë (dialect)	Uncle or Older brother
Lalbukri	burri i hallës	Uncle uncle in law (father's sister's husband)
Vova	motra e madhe	Older sister
Tata	babai or at/tata (dialect)	Father
Mëmë	nënë or mama	Mother
Mëdhè	edhe/ende	Also
ghua	vëlla	brother
Ndrëngova	Kuptova	I understood
Sprasmja	Fund	end
Jot'ëm sempri të thëshjë të mos haje nga tajuri çë ngë ka' klënë pastruar!	Jot'ëmë përherë/gjithmonë të thoshte të mos haje nga pjata që nuk është pastruar!	Your mother always said don't eat from plates that haven't been cleaned!
Kemi besë se ai ngë i ftes	besojmë se ai nuk ka faj	We believe he is not at fault

The Lord's Prayer Arbëresh by Sicily (first row)

Compared with Standard Tosk Albanian (second row),
and Gheg Albanian (third row).

Áti jinë	çë je	në	qiell,	shejtëruar kloft	embri	jít.
Ati ynë	që je	në	qiell,	u shënjtëroftë	emri	yt.
Ati ynë	që je	në	qiell,	shejtnue kjoftë	emni	yt.
Our father who art in heaven				hallowed be thy name

arthët	rregjëria	jóte;	u bëftë	vullimi	jít,
arthtë	mbretëria	jote;	u bëftë	dëshira	jote,
ardhtë	mbretnia	jote;	u baftë	vullnesa	jote,
thy kingdom come			thy will be done

si ndë	qiell,	ashtú	në	dhé;
si në	qiell,	edhe	mbi	dhe.
si në	qiell	ashtu	në	dhe.
on earth as it is in heaven

bukën	tënë	të përditshme	ëna	neve	sòt;
bukën	tonë	të përditëshme	jepna	neve	sot;
bukën	tonë	të përditshme	epna	ne	sot;
give us this day our daily bread

ndëjena	dëtyrët	tóna,
edhe	falna	fajet	tona,
e ndiejna ne fajet e mëkatet			tona,
and forgive us our trespasses

ashtù si	na	ja	ndëjejëm	dëtyruamëvet	tanë;
sikundër	edhe	ne	ua	falim	fajtorëvet	tanë;
si i ndiejmë na					fajtorët	tanë;
as we forgive those who trespass against us

e	mos	na	le	të	biem	në	ngarje,	pó	lirona	nga	i	ligu;
edhe	mos	na	shtjerë	në	ngasje,	po	shpëtona	nga	i	ligu;
e	mos	na	len me ra	në	keq,	por	largona	prej gjith së keq;
and lead us not into temptation						but deliver us from evil

Ashtu kloft.
Ashtu qoft.
Amen.

== Grammar comparison ==
There are many elements of Arberesh grammar that differ considerably from Albanian, for example:

Arbërisht	Shqip	Meaning	Notes
ka shkosh	do të kalosh	You will pass	Arbërisht uses the common Balkan participle ka, whereas Shqip uses do which translates as 'want', which is also a feature of the Balkan sprachsbund
flini alluras/anangasij	folni/flisni shpejt	Speak fast (pl.)	
flëni	flini	Sleep! (pl.)	
bëjëm të shkonj	më lër të kaloj	Let me pass	Shqip uses 'allow me to pass' whereas Arbërisht uses 'we do to pass' and 'able to pass'.
vajta	Vajta/shkova	I went	Arbërisht conjugates from the Tosk word të vete whereas shkova means 'I passed' in Arbërisht
ke gjegjur	ke dëgjuar	You have heard	
Zoti/prifti zën fill parkalesin/lutjen	Prifti fillon lutjen	The priest starts the prayer	
Stis	Ndërtoj	I build	
Jo, nëng/ngë e kam parë	Jo, nuk e kam parë	No, I haven't seen it	
jam e flas, je flet, ai isht e flet, ajo isht e flet, jem'e flasjëm, jan'e flasjën, jan'e flini	po flas, ti po flet, ai po flet, ajo po flet, po flasim, po flasin, po flisni	I am talking, you are talking, he is talking, she is talking, we are talking, they are talking, you (pl) are talking	The present continuous is marked with the structure 'I am, You are, He is, She is, We are, They are etc. Whereas Shqip uses po which literally means 'yes'
ki’ të zgjoneshjëm	duhet të ishim zgjuar	We should have got up	
Ku ë/isht/osht Mëria?	Ku është Maria?	Where is Maria?	The locative marker te which literally means 'to' is added before ku 'where'. (A similar phenomenon occurs in Welsh English and West Country English i.e. 'Where to you going?' or 'Where's he to?')
Mërìa rri alartë	Maria jeton lartë	Maria lives upstairs	
Si ë Zotërote?	Si jeni ju, Zotëri?	How are you sir?	The polite or formal is marked by use of Zotërote with ju being reserved for the plural only

== Name ==
The name Arbërishte is derived from the ethnonym "Albanoi", which in turn comes from the toponym "Arbëria" (Greek: Άρβανα), which in the Middle Ages referred to a region in what is today Albania (Babiniotis 1998). Its native equivalents (Arbërorë, Arbëreshë and others) used to be the self-designation of Albanians in general. Both "Arbëria" and "Albania/Albanian" go further back to name forms attested since antiquity.

Within the Arbëresh community the language is often referred to as "Tarbrisht" or "Gjegje". The origin of the term "gjegje" is uncertain, however this does mean "listen" in Arbërisht. Gheg is also the name of one of the two major dialects of Albanian as spoken in the Balkans. According to the writer Arshi Pipa, the term Gegë was initially used for confessional denotation, being used in pre-Ottoman Albania by its Orthodox population when referring to their Catholic neighbors.

== Arbëresh names ==
Every Italo-Albanian person is given a legal Italian name and also a name in Albanian Arbërisht. Quite often the Arbëresh name is merely a translation of the Italian name. Arbëresh surnames are also used amongst villagers but do not carry any legal weight; the Arbëresh surname is called an "ofiqe" in Arbërisht. Some Arbëresh 'ofiqe' are 'Butijuni', 'Pafundi', 'Skarpari' (shoemaker from Italian word scarpa).

Examples of Italian names and their Arbëresh equivalents:

Italian	Arbëresh
Giuseppe	Zef, Josif
Marco	Marku
Luca	Lekë, Lekini/u
Francesco	Frangjishk, Nxhiku, Çiku
Nicola	Kola, Koll, Nikoll
Angelica	Ëngjëlliqe
Gabriele	Gavril, Bjelli
Alessandro	Lishëndër-i
Elena, Elenuccia	Lena, Lenuca
Giacomo	Minu, Minikeli, Jakini
Mario, Mariuccio	Marjani, Marjucë
Emanuele, Manuele	Manuel-i
Maria	Mëria
Martino	Martini, Tinuçë
Gaetano	Tani
Eleuterio	Lëfteri
Antonio	Ndon, Nton, Gjon
Gaspare	Ghaspani
Domenica	Mima
Lorenzo	Lloreu
Giovanni	Jani, Xhuan, Vanù
Demetrio	Dhimitër-i
Spiridione	Spiridhon, Dhoni, Spiro
Rosalia, Rosario	Sallja, Saridu
Tommaso, Tommasino	Masinë
Cosimo	Gësmëni
Saverio	Shaverë
Andrea	Ndrica

== Language samples ==
=== Pronouns ===
Personal pronouns
		singular		plural	
1st person		u	I	na	we
2nd person		ti	you	ju	you
3rd person	MASC.	aji	he	ata	they (m.)
3rd person	FEM.	ajo	she	ato	they (f.)

Possessive pronouns
		singular		plural	
1st person		jim	mine	jynë	ours
2nd person		jytë	yours	juaj	yours
3rd person	MASC.	i/e tíj	his	atyre	theirs
3rd person	FEM.	i/e saj	hers	atyre	theirs

=== Verbs ===
Personal moods
Mood	Tense	Number and person						English equivalent (only 1SG)
Mood	Tense	Singular			Plural			English equivalent (only 1SG)
Mood	Tense	1st	2nd	3rd	1st	2nd	3rd	English equivalent (only 1SG)
Indicative	Pluperfect	kisha burë	kishe burë	kishë burë	kishëm burë	kishni burë	kishin burë	I had done
Indicative	Imperfect	ish'e buja (she buja)	ish'e buje (she buje)	ish'e bun (she bun)	ishm'e bujëm	ishn'e buni	ishn'e bujën	I was doing
Indicative	Perfect	bura	bure	burë	burëm	burën	burën	I did
Indicative	Present perfect	ka burë	ka burë	ka burë	ka burë	ka burë	ka burë	I have done
Indicative	Present	bunj	bun	bun	bujëm	buni	bujën	I do, I am doing
Indicative	Future	ka bunj	ka bush	ka buje	ka bujëm	ka buni	ka bujën	I will do
Imperative	Present	—N/a	buje!	—N/a	—N/a	buni!	—N/a	do! (2nd person only)

Verbals
	Form	English
Infinitive	të bunj	to do
Gerund	jam e bunj	doing

	The verb HAVE				The verb BE			
	PRES	IMPERF	SUBJ.IMPERF	SUBJ.PERF	PRES	IMPERF	SUBJ.IMPERF	SUBJ.PERF
1SG	kam	keshë	të kem	të keshë	jam	jeshë	të jem	të jeshë
2SG	ke	keshe	të kesh	të keshe	je	jeshe	të jesh	të jëshe
3SG	ka	kish	të ket	të kish	ishtë, është	ish	të jet	të ish
1PL	kemi	keshëm	të kemi	te keshëm	jemi	jeshëm	të jeshëm	të jeshëm
2PL	kini	keshëtë	të kini	te keshëtë	jini	jeshëtë	të jeshëtë	të jeshëtë
3PL	kanë	kishnë	të kenë	të kishnë	janë	ishnë	të jenë	të ishnë

=== Some common phrases ===
Arberesh	English
Falem	Hello.
Çë bun? Si rri?	What are you doing? How are you?
Jam shum mirë	I am very well
Të haristis, je mirë?	Thank you, and are you well?
O, jam edhe u mirë.	Yes, I'm fine too.
Flet arbreshin?	Do you speak Arbërisht?
Ka vjen?	Where are you from?
Jam arbëresh	I'm Italo-Albanian
Mëma isht ka Srigari	My mother is from San Cosmo Albanese
Ju parkales	Please
Gëzonem të të njoh	Pleased to meet you
Mirëdita	Good morning
Shihemi	See you soon
Gjegjemi njize	We'll speak soon
Si të thon?	What's your name?
Mua më thonë Marieja	My name is Maria
Ëj/ò	Yes (Piana degli Albanesi)
Arà/ëj	Yes (Santa Cristina Gela)
Ora/ëj	Yes (Contessa Entellina)
Jo	No

=== Prepositions ===
Arbëresh	English
te	to
nga/ka	from
prapa	behind
te ana e	beside, next to
mbatanë	on the other side
kundër	against
me	with
'e (F), i (M), të (N & PL)	of
brënda	within, inside
jashtë	outside
sipër	on, above
njera	until
për	for
nën	under
mjes/midis/ndër	between, among

=== Demonstrative pronouns ===
Demonstrative pronouns replace nouns once they are able to be understood from their context.

Arbëresh	English
ai/ajo	that (m/f)
ata/ato	those (m/f)
ki/kjo	this (m/f)
rta/rto	these
mosgjë/farëgjë	none

=== Sample text ===
Shërbesa e Kurorës - The Arbëresh Marriage Ceremony
Zoti : Gjergji, do ti të marsh për gruja Linën çë ë ke këtú te ana, si urdhuron Klisha Shejte, e të qëndrosh lidhur me atë në të mirën si edhé në të ligën gjithë ditët e gjellës tënde?
Priest: Do you George want to take as your wife Lina who is present here according to the instructions of the Holy Church and to be faithful through the good and the bad all of your life?
Dhëndërri: O, e dua!
Groom: Yes, I want!
Zoti: Bekuar kloft Perëndia jínë nga herë, naní e për gjithëmonë e për jetë të jetëvet.
Priest: blessed be our God for all time, now and always in the centuries of centuries.
Populli: Amín.
People: Amen.
Zoti: Në paqe parkalesjëm t'ën Zonë.
Priest: In peace we pray to the Lord.
Populli: Lipisí, o i Madh'yn'Zot.
People: Our Great God, we beseech you.
Bekimi të unazavet
Zoti: Me këtë unazë shërbëtori i Perëndis, Gjergji, lidhet me shërbëtorën e Perëndis, Lina, në embër të Atit, të Birit e të Shpirtit Shejt.
Priest: The servant of God, George, is tied to the servant of God, Lina, in the name of the Father, the Son, and the Holy Spirit.
Zoti jep krinjët e këndon Msalmin 127:

Të limë atá çë i trëmben t'ynë Zoti e çë jecjën te udhët e Tij.

the priest delivers the candles and intones Psalm 127

Make happy those who fear the Lord and may they walk in His ways.

Lëvdi tij, o i madh'yn'Zot, lëvdi tij. Dhóksa si, o Theós imón, dhóksa si
Glory to you, our God, glory to you.
Se ti ka hashë bukën e shërbëtyrës s'duarvet tote. Lumë ti e fatbardhë ka jeshë. Jotë shoqe ka jet si dhri me pemë te muret e shpis tënde. Bijët tatë si degë ullinjësh rrethë triesës tënde. Shi kështú ka jet bekuar njeriu çë ka trëmbësirën e Perëndisë.
That you will eat the bread of the work of your hands. You will be happy and enjoy all that is good.

See your wife as a fertile vine in the intimacy of your home. That your daughters will be like olive branches around your table. That those who fear the Lord will be blessed.
