= Sant'Agata di Esaro =

- Comune
- Comune di Sant'Agata di Esaro
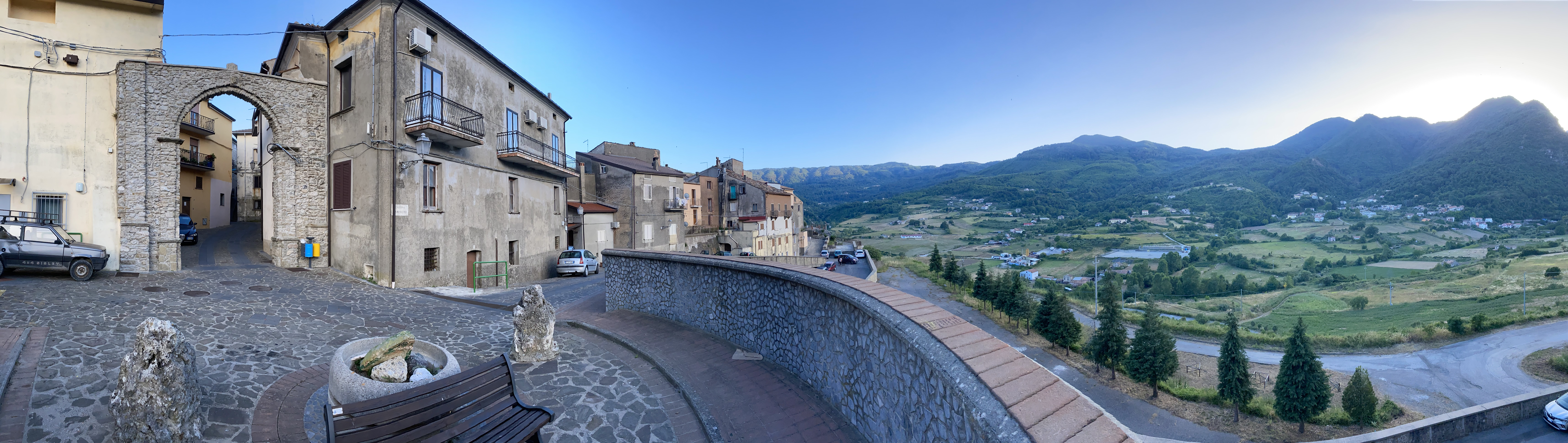

- Coat of arms

- Location within Italy Location within Calabria
- Coordinates: 39°37′N 15°59′E
- Country: Italy
- Region: Calabria
- Province: Cosenza (CS)
- Frazioni: Belvedere Marittimo, Bonifati, Buonvicino, Cetraro, Malvito, Mottafollone, Sangineto

Government
  - Mayor: Mario Nocito

Area
  - Total: 47 km^{2} (18 sq mi)
- Elevation: 450 m (1,480 ft)

Population (30 September 2012)
  - Total: 1,952
  - Density: 42/km^{2} (110/sq mi)
- Demonym: Santagatesi
- Time zone: UTC+1 (CET)
  - Summer (DST): UTC+2 (CEST)
- Postal code: 87010
- Dialing code: 0981
- ISTAT code: 078131
- Patron saint: St. Francis of Paola
- Saint day: 5 February
- Website: Official website

Sant'Agata di Esaro is a town and comune in the province of Cosenza, in the Calabria region of southern Italy.

== Twin towns ==
- Seregno, Italy
