= San Lucido =

- Comune
- Comune di San Lucido
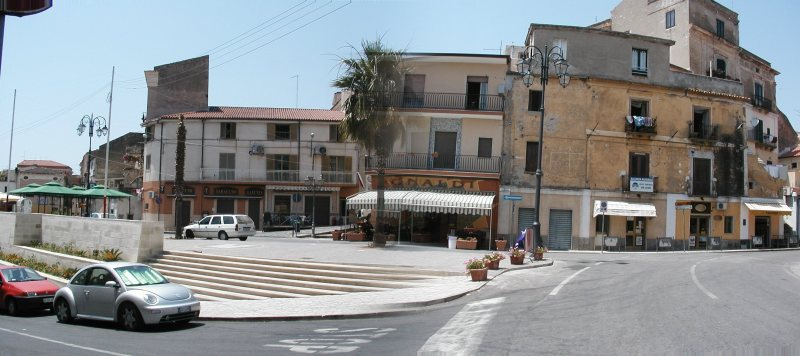

- Coat of arms

- Location within Italy Location within Calabria
- Coordinates: 39°19′N 16°3′E
- Country: Italy
- Region: Calabria
- Province: Cosenza (CS)
- Frazioni: Acqua Bianca, Acqualeone, Cerasuolo, Deuda, Granoriso, Miccisi, Pollella, Puppa, San Giovanni, Santa Lucia, Varco

Government
  - Mayor: Alessandro Stefano

Area
  - Total: 27.12 km^{2} (10.47 sq mi)
- Elevation: 56 m (184 ft)

Population (2002)
  - Total: 5,589
  - Density: 206.1/km^{2} (533.8/sq mi)
- Demonym: Sanlucidani
- Time zone: UTC+1 (CET)
  - Summer (DST): UTC+2 (CEST)
- Postal code: 87038
- Dialing code: 0982
- Patron saint: St. John the Baptist
- Saint day: 24 June
- Website: Official website

San Lucido (Calabrian: Sàntu Lùcitu) is a town and comune in the province of Cosenza in the Calabria region of southern Italy.

== Geography ==
The municipality borders with Falconara Albanese, Marano Marchesato, Marano Principato, Paola, Rende and San Fili. It counts the hamlets (frazioni) of Acqua Bianca, Acqualeone, Cerasuolo, Deuda, Granoriso, Miccisi, Pollella, Puppa, San Giovanni, Santa Lucia and Varco.

== Economy ==
San Lucido is one of the few towns in the area where the town itself is close to the sea. Most of the other towns in the area have the old town or "centro storico" 2–5 km back from the sea and a new "marina" area with new build apartments and shops closer to the sea. Whilst the tourism in the area has suffered since the 1990s, due to winter storms and damage to the beaches it is slowly building back up and as many as 6–10,000 tourists per week holidaying in San Lucido in the month of August and taking advantage of the newly constructed sea defences and beaches. Tourism relies mainly upon Italian holiday makers but there are an increasing number of British, Irish and Americans visiting and holidaying in the town.
