= Coeli =

Coeli may refer to:

- The Imum Coeli is the point in space where the ecliptic crosses the meridian in the north
- Porta Coeli is one of the oldest church structures in the Western hemisphere.
- 3276 Porta Coeli (1982 RZ1) is a Main-belt Asteroid discovered on September 15, 1982, by A. Mrkos at Klet.
- The Regina Coeli is an ancient Latin Marian Hymn of the Christian Church
- Regina Coeli (prison), the most notorious prison in Rome
- Regina Coeli is a Latin name that means "Queen of Heaven" depicting the Virgin Mary, most commonly used among Roman Catholics.
- Santa Maria Scala Coeli is a church on the site of St Paul the Apostle's prison on Via delle Tre Fontane in Rome.
- Scala Coeli is a village and commune in the province of Cosenza in the Calabria region of southern Italy.
