= Scala Coeli =

Scala Coeli Skàla Koìle (Greek)
- Comune
- Comune di Scala Coeli
- Coat of arms

- Location within Italy Location within Calabria
- Coordinates: 39°27′N 16°53′E
- Country: Italy
- Region: Calabria
- Province: Cosenza (CS)
- Frazioni: San Morello

Government
  - Mayor: Giovanni Matalone

Area
  - Total: 67.5 km^{2} (26.1 sq mi)
- Elevation: 363 m (1,191 ft)

Population (2018-01-01)
  - Total: 1,389
  - Density: 20.6/km^{2} (53.3/sq mi)
- Demonym: Scalesi
- Time zone: UTC+1 (CET)
  - Summer (DST): UTC+2 (CEST)
- Postal code: 87060
- Dialing code: 0983
- Patron saint: St. Anthony of Padua
- Saint day: 13 June
- Website: Official website

Scala Coeli (Italian pronunciation: [ˈskaːla ˈtʃɛːli]; Latin for 'Heaven's Staircase'; Medieval Greek: Σκάλα Κοίλη, romanized: Skála Koílē, lit. 'Hollow Staircase') is a village and comune in the province of Cosenza in the Calabria region of southern Italy.

The village is bordered by Campana, Cariati, Crucoli, Mandatoriccio, Terravecchia and Umbriatico.
