= Zumpano, Calabria =

Zumpano Greek: Zumbáno
- Comune
- Comune di Zumpano
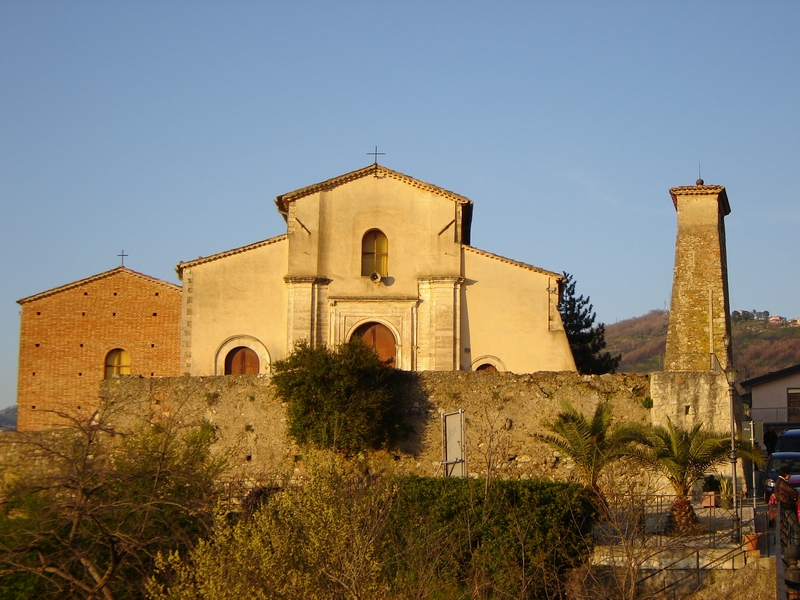
- Saint George's church.

- Location within Italy Location within Calabria
- Coordinates: 39°19′N 16°18′E
- Country: Italy
- Region: Calabria
- Province: Cosenza (CS)

Government
  - Mayor: Maria Lucente

Area
  - Total: 8.08 km^{2} (3.12 sq mi)
- Elevation: 429 m (1,407 ft)

Population (2007)
  - Total: 2,053
  - Density: 254/km^{2} (658/sq mi)
- Demonym: Zumpanesi
- Time zone: UTC+1 (CET)
  - Summer (DST): UTC+2 (CEST)
- Postal code: 87040
- Dialing code: 0984
- ISTAT code: 078155
- Patron saint: Saint George
- Saint day: 23 April
- Website: Official website

Zumpano (Calabrian: Zzumpànu) is a town and comune in the province of Cosenza in the Calabria region of southern Italy.
