= San Fili =

San Fili Griko: Agía Fíli
- Comune
- Comune di San Fili
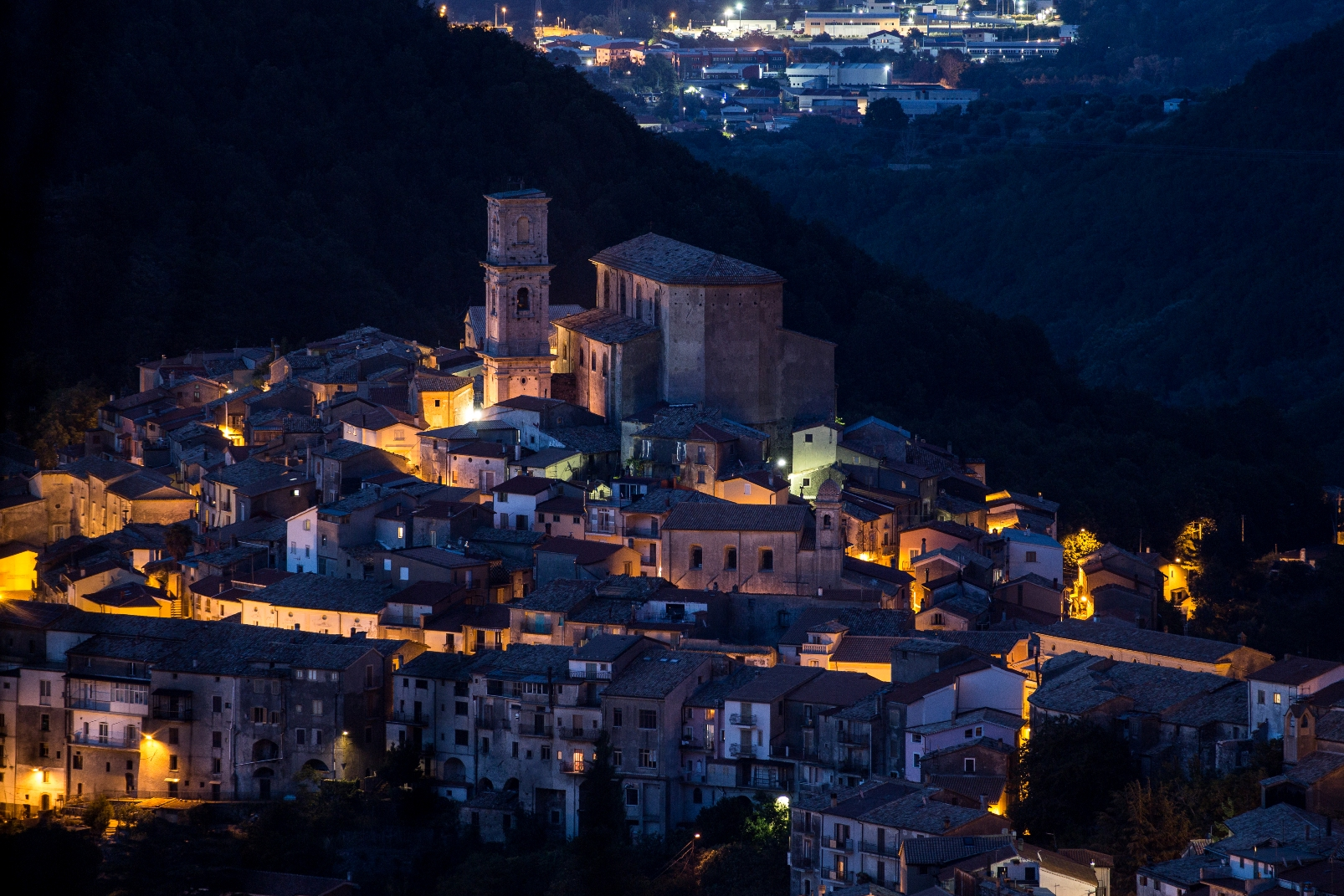

- Location within Italy Location within Calabria
- Coordinates: 39°20′N 16°9′E
- Country: Italy
- Region: Calabria
- Province: Cosenza (CS)
- Frazioni: Bucita, Frassino, Cozzi

Government
  - Mayor: Linda Cribari

Area
  - Total: 20 km^{2} (7.7 sq mi)
- Elevation: 566 m (1,857 ft)

Population
  - Total: 2,503
  - Density: 130/km^{2} (320/sq mi)
- Demonym: Sanfilesi
- Time zone: UTC+1 (CET)
  - Summer (DST): UTC+2 (CEST)
- Postal code: 87037
- Dialing code: 0984
- Patron saint: St. Francis of Paola
- Saint day: 12 October
- Website: www.comune.sanfili.cs.it

San Fili is a village and comune in the province of Cosenza in the Calabria region of southern Italy.

== Geography ==
The town is bordered by Marano Principato, Montalto Uffugo, Paola, Rende, San Lucido and San Vincenzo La Costa.

San Fili is 566 meters above sea level.

== History ==
The village once called Felum later became Terra Sancti Felicis, in honor of San Felice, to whom the population was devoted to the parish church of that time. The denomination San Fili took place later and in the 15th century, the town became part of the county of Rende belonging to the Adorno Doges of Genoa from 1445 to 1529. From 1532 Rende (and therefore San Fili) was raised to the marquisate and included to Ferrente de Alarcone.

San Fili has a fraction and two districts; the Bucita fraction and the Frassino and Cozzi districts. They made it San Fili: Vincenzo Miceli (1858–1928) a professor of Constitutional Law and then of Philosophy of Law in the University of Pisa, Palermo, and Perugia, and again Alfonso Miceli, his brother (1855–1940) president of the Court of Appeal of Naples, both natives of San Fili and belonging to the homonymous baronial family of the Miceli of Serradileo. In more recent times by Baron Marcello Miceli (1918–1992) Gentleman of His Holiness Paul VI, John Paul I, and John Paul II, and Knight of Grace and Devotion of the Sovereign Order of Malta.

Several Sanfilesi have emigrated to Canada and the United States, and a significant number also to South America (Argentina and Brazil above all), as well as many emigrants to European countries such as Germany and Switzerland. Today the descendants of Sanfilesi emigrants are a large number; an example is a Canadian community which appears to have reached 6,000 units.

== Monuments and places of interest ==
Religious architecture

- There are documents of the church Madre Santissima Annunziata which attest to its presence as early as 1304. Don Saverio Ricciulli of Rogliano through a project of reconstruction and advancement of the church between 1748 and 1802 improved its structure. The church is made up of a Latin cross plan with three naves and a Baroque facade. The interior is composed of a carved wooden choir and excellent late 18th-century works. Notable are a crucifix by Frangipane of excellent workmanship and the works on four paintings by the Evangelists by the sanfilese Antonio Granata. The bell tower on the side of the church damaged over time by earthquakes, consists of a large clock built in the early 19th century by the Blasi brothers.
- The church of the Retreat formerly called Santa Maria degli Angeli, a 17th-century building. Used in the 19th century by the Retreating Fraticelli and used as a church with an adjacent cemetery towards the end of the 19th century. Inside the most important works are the statue of the Madonna degli Angeli made by a pupil of Gagini, and a processional wooden crucifix from the 1600s. The church reopened in 1996 after being restored for damage due to the earthquake over the years 80.
- The church of the Holy Spirit is located in the homonymous district, the structure of the same is a single nave of the early 17th century, with a bell tower and a tuff baroque portal. Above the portal, there is a painting of San Francesco di Paola from 1854 produced after surviving unscathed from the earthquake. The most important works inside a wooden bust of San Francesco di Paola, the canvas by Antonio Granata and some frescoes by Raffaele Rinaldi.
- The church of Sant'Antonio Abate built in the 16th century was used over the centuries for disparate uses, of artistic importance above all for the exposed wooden beam ceiling and the remarkable painting by Raffaele Rinaldi.
- The church of the Carmine built between 1919 and 1920 by the will of Don Salvatore Apuzzo, who engaged in the collection of offerings in the Sanfilese population and in the surrounding villages for its construction and for the subsequent arrival of the statue of the Madonna currently present.
- The church of Santa Lucia built towards the end of the 19th century on what remained of an ancient chapel, in the area where the abbot Joachim of Fiore preached in the 12th century.
- The first news on the church of the Immaculate Conception dates back to 1666 and appears to be equipped with everything necessary for the celebration of mass. The church of the Concezione has a single nave. In the main façade, crowned by a sober triangular tympanum, there is an arched portal, in tufaceous stone. Above the keystone the plaque with the Latin inscription is still preserved. In the upper part there is a single lancet window with a mixed-line frame. Next to the church stands the square bell tower. there are a seventeenth-century statue of the Immaculate Conception, of considerable artistic value, placed on the High Altar, a wooden bust of St. Joseph with the Child (eighteenth century), the wooden benches where the members of the ancient Confraternity of the Immaculate Conception sat, made in the eighteenth century by local workers, an elegant wooden confessional from the eighteenth century and a splendid crucifix from the late nineteenth century.

== Culture ==
=== Traditions ===
The village of San Fili is known as the "village of magare", creatures identified in most of Southern Italy as witches. In reality they are not sorcerers: in San Fili the "magare" were those women who today we would call naturopaths or herbalists. With the difference that in addition to the knowledge of herbs and natural remedies, they also have popular wisdom, a strong religiosity and a suggestive charm.

=== Events ===
In August, a cultural and food and wine event called "Notti delle magare" is held.

=== Kitchen ===
Pasta e patate ara tijeddra, majatica, cuddruriaddri e vecchiareddre, turdiddri, chjina, pallone di fichi, crocette di fichi

== Infrastructure and transport ==
The main street of the village is via XX Settembre.

The SS107 (State Road 107) Silana Crotonese connects the territory of San Fili in less than twenty kilometres: to Cosenza, the University of Calabria, the A2 Rende - Cosenza north highway, and Paola.

== Sport ==
San Fili Calcio 1926 plays in campionato di Promozione calabrese.

== Notable people ==
- Santino Marella (born 1974), professional wrestler, billed from San Fili, Calabria, whose family emigrated to Ontario, Canada.

== Gallery ==
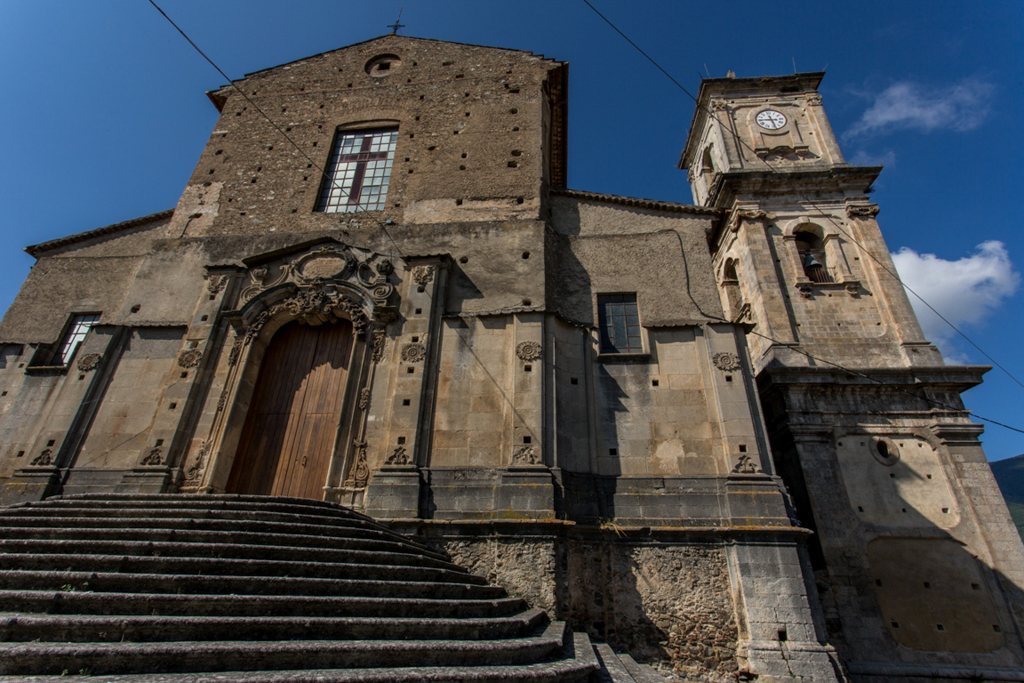
Mother Santissima Annunziata church

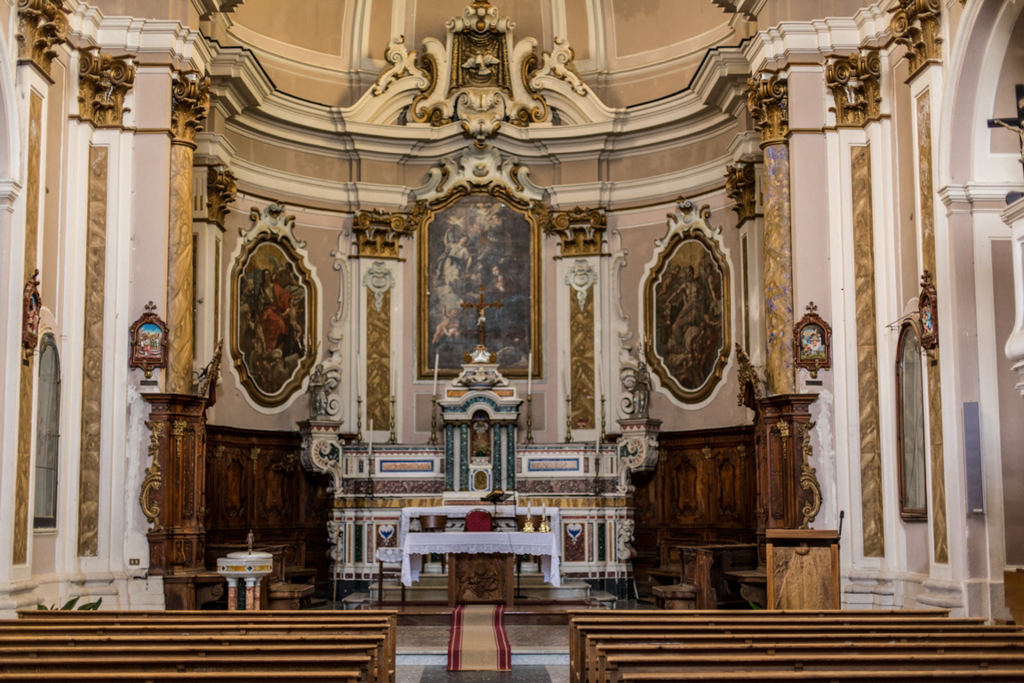
Interior of the Mother Santissima Annunziata church

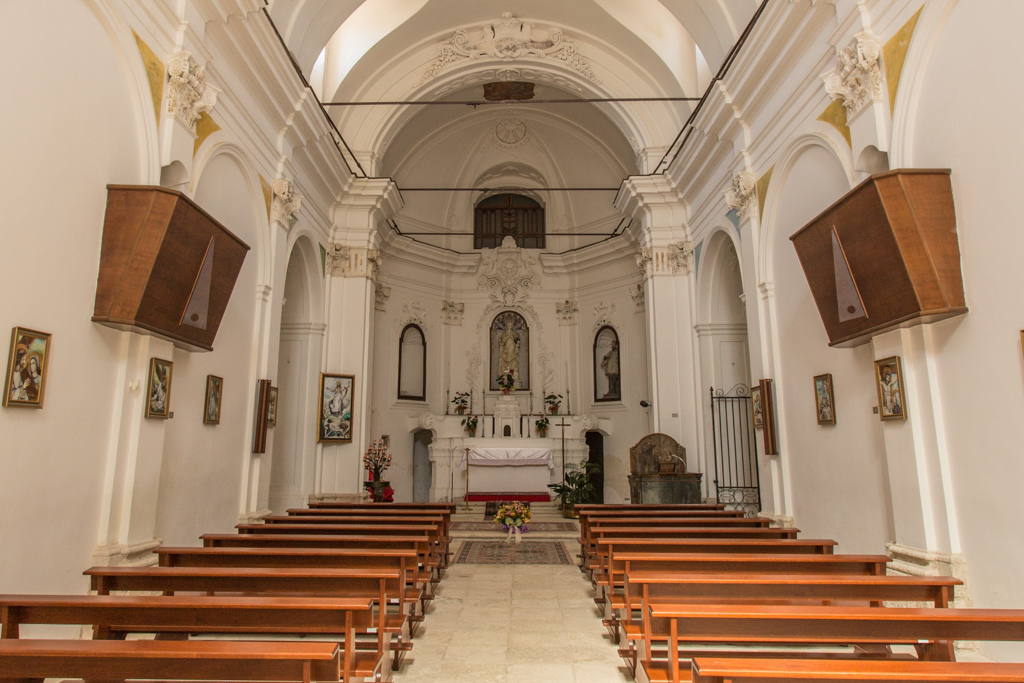
Interior of Church of the Retreat or Santa Maria degli Angeli

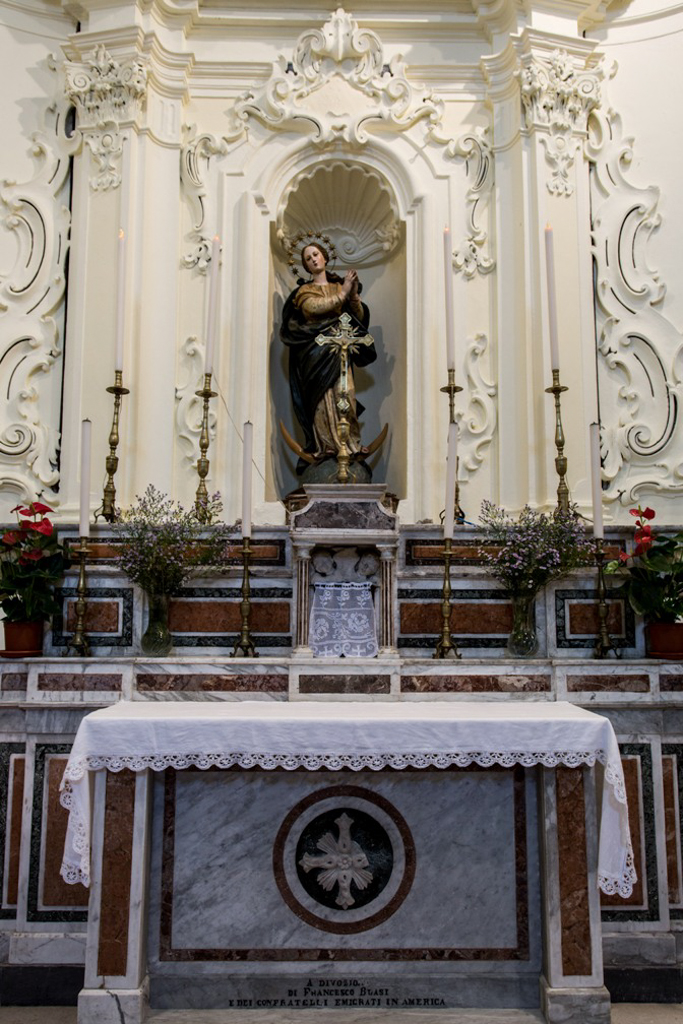
Church of Immacolata Concezione

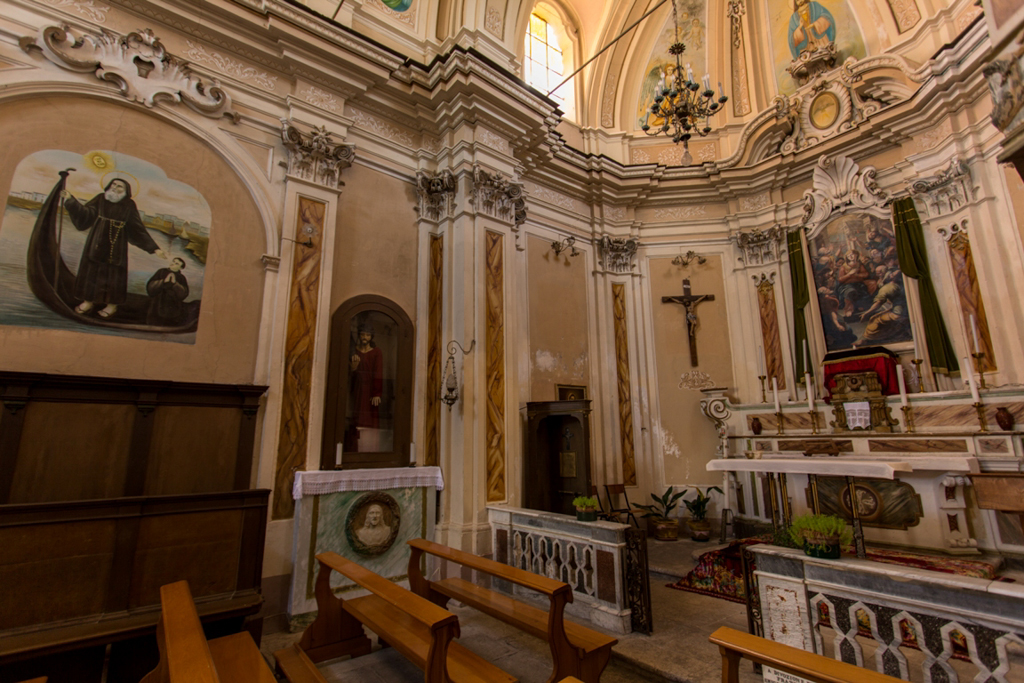
Interior of church of the Holy Spirit

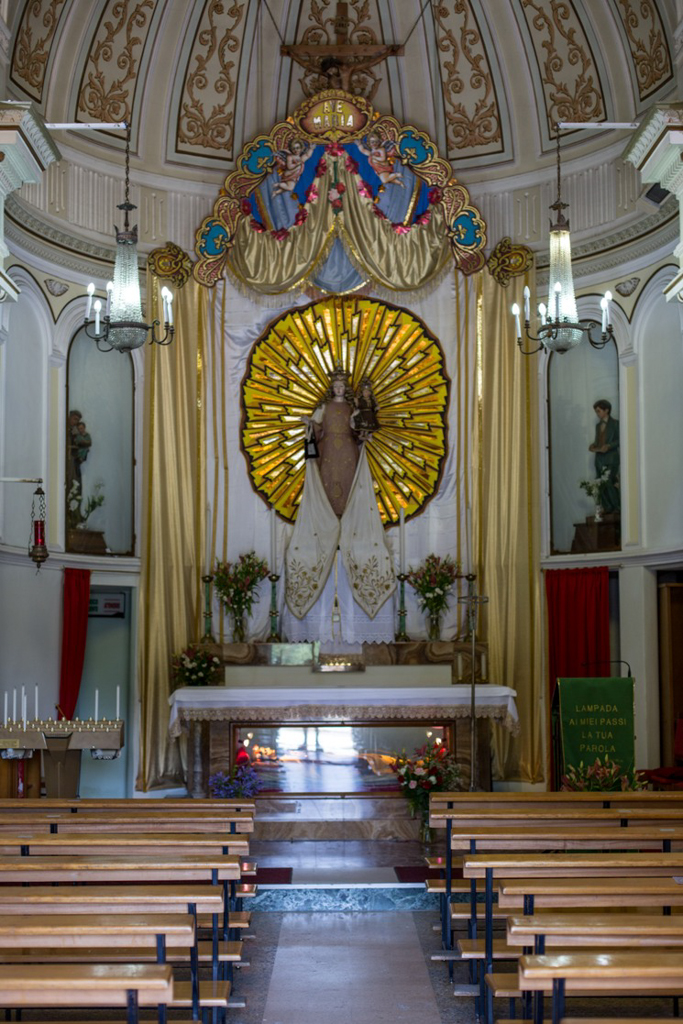
Church of the Carmine

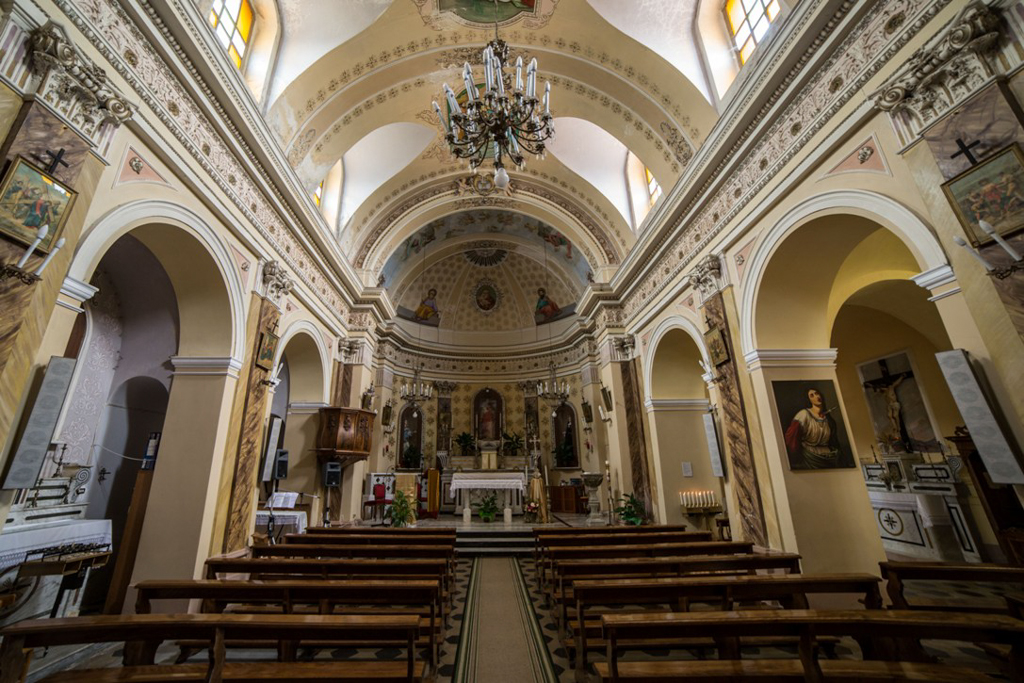
Church of Saint Lucia

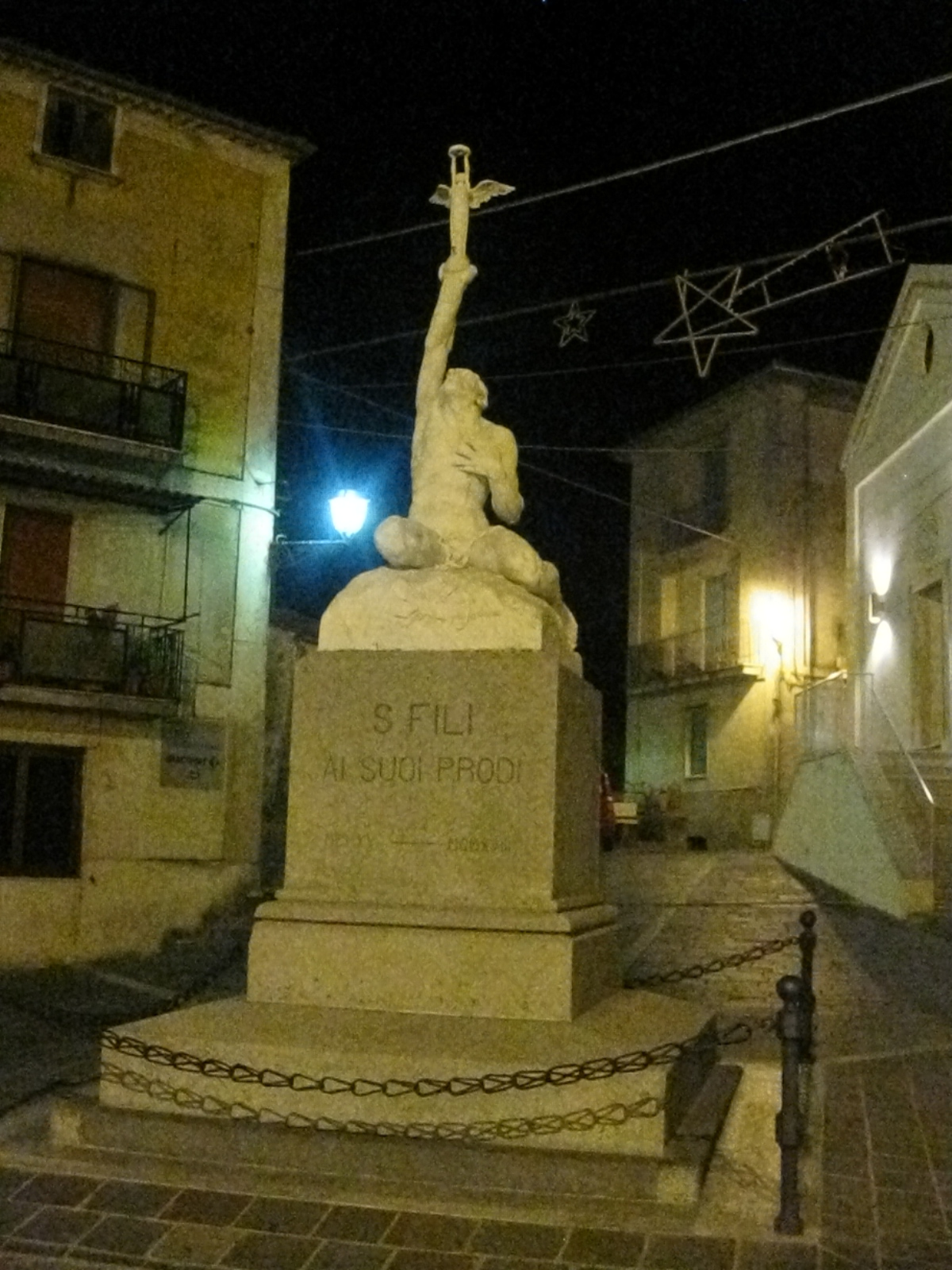
Monument to the Fallen

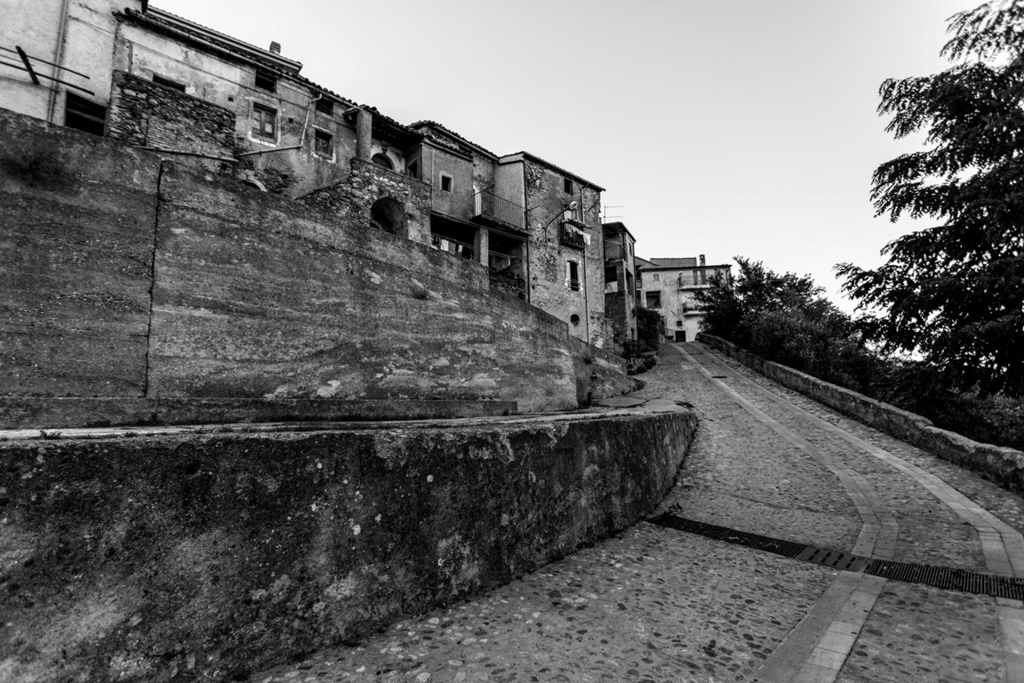
Via Casalini (Bucita)

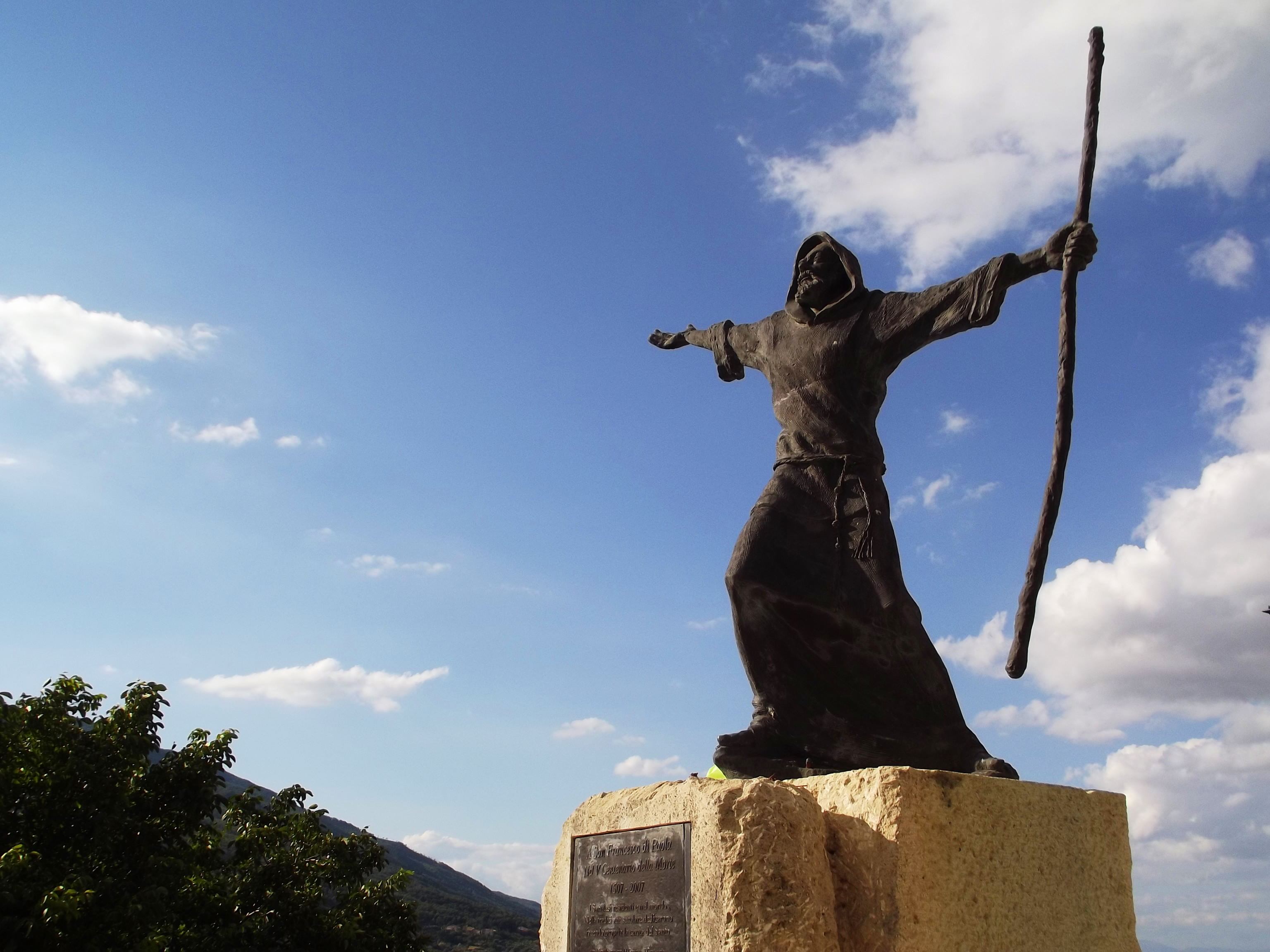
Statue of Saint Francis of Paola

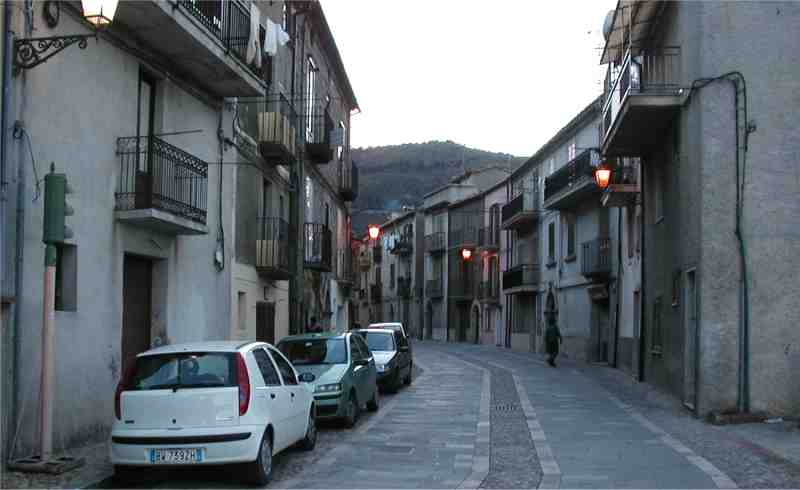
via XX Settembre

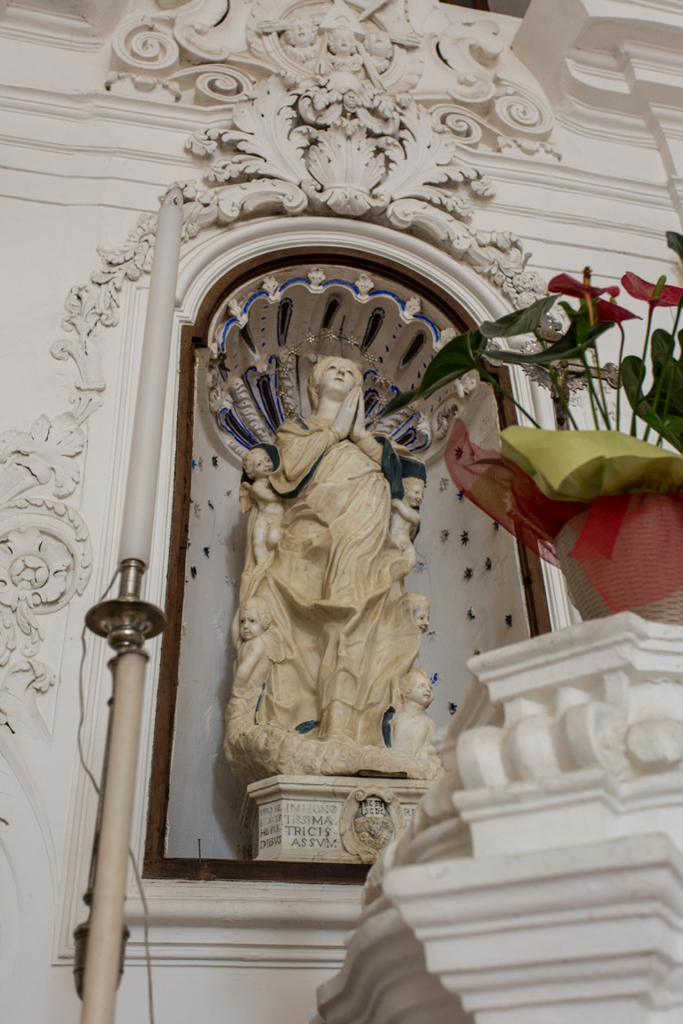
Statue of Santa Maria degli angeli
