= Cervicati =

- Comune
- Comune di Cervicati
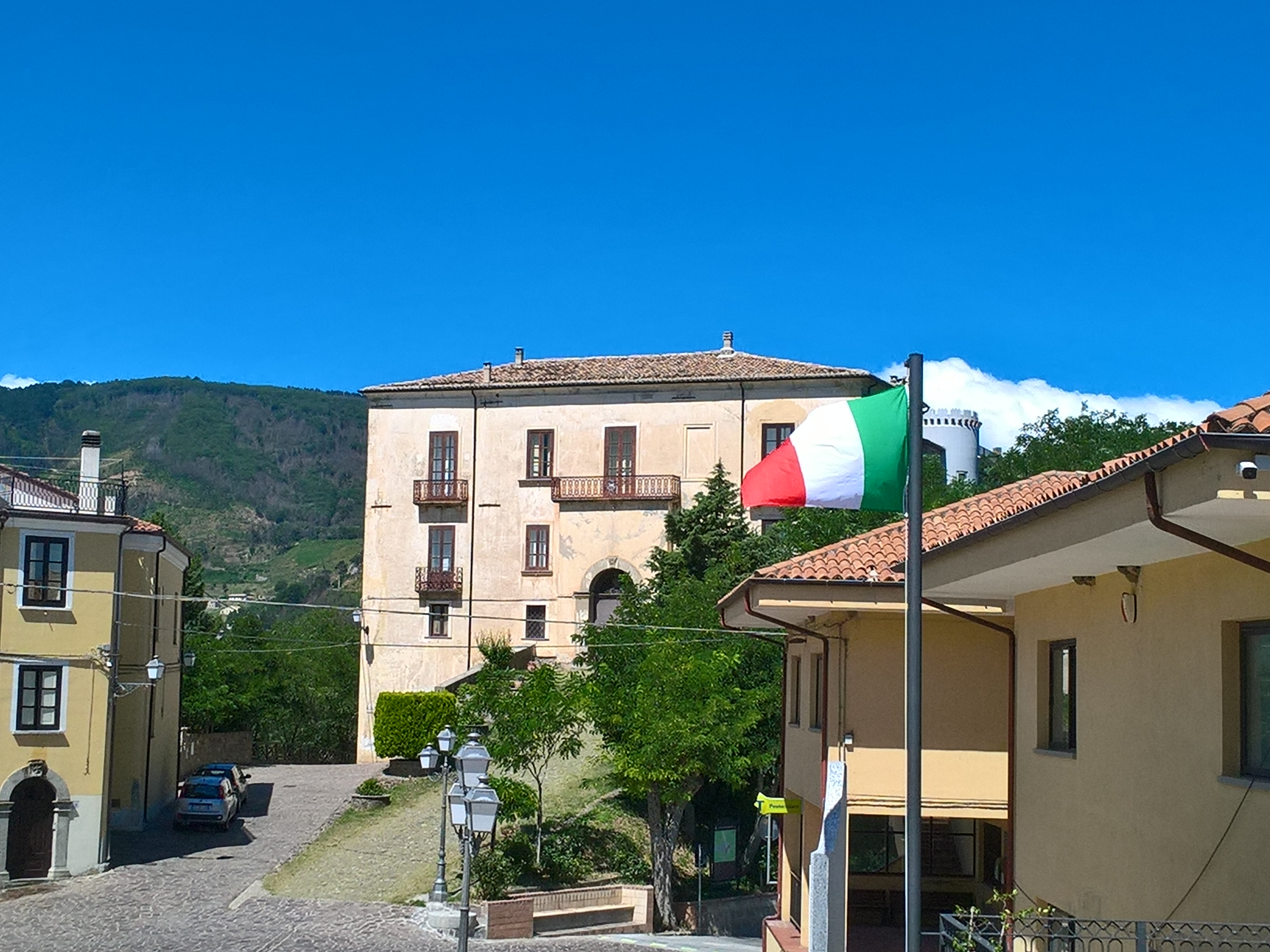
- Town hall.

- Location within Italy Location within Calabria
- Coordinates: 39°33′N 16°8′E
- Country: Italy
- Region: Calabria
- Province: Cosenza (CS)

Government
  - Mayor: Gioberto Felice

Area
  - Total: 12.09 km^{2} (4.67 sq mi)
- Elevation: 491 m (1,611 ft)

Population (30 June 2017)
  - Total: 817
  - Density: 67.6/km^{2} (175/sq mi)
- Demonym: Cervicatesi
- Time zone: UTC+1 (CET)
  - Summer (DST): UTC+2 (CEST)
- Postal code: 87010
- Dialing code: 0984
- ISTAT code: 078038
- Patron saint: St. Roch
- Saint day: 16 August
- Website: Official website

Cervicati (Calabrian: Cirvicàtu, Albanian: Çervikati) is an Arbëreshë town and comune in the province of Cosenza in the Calabria region of southern Italy.
