= Luzzi, Italy =

Luzzi
- Comune
- Comune di Luzzi
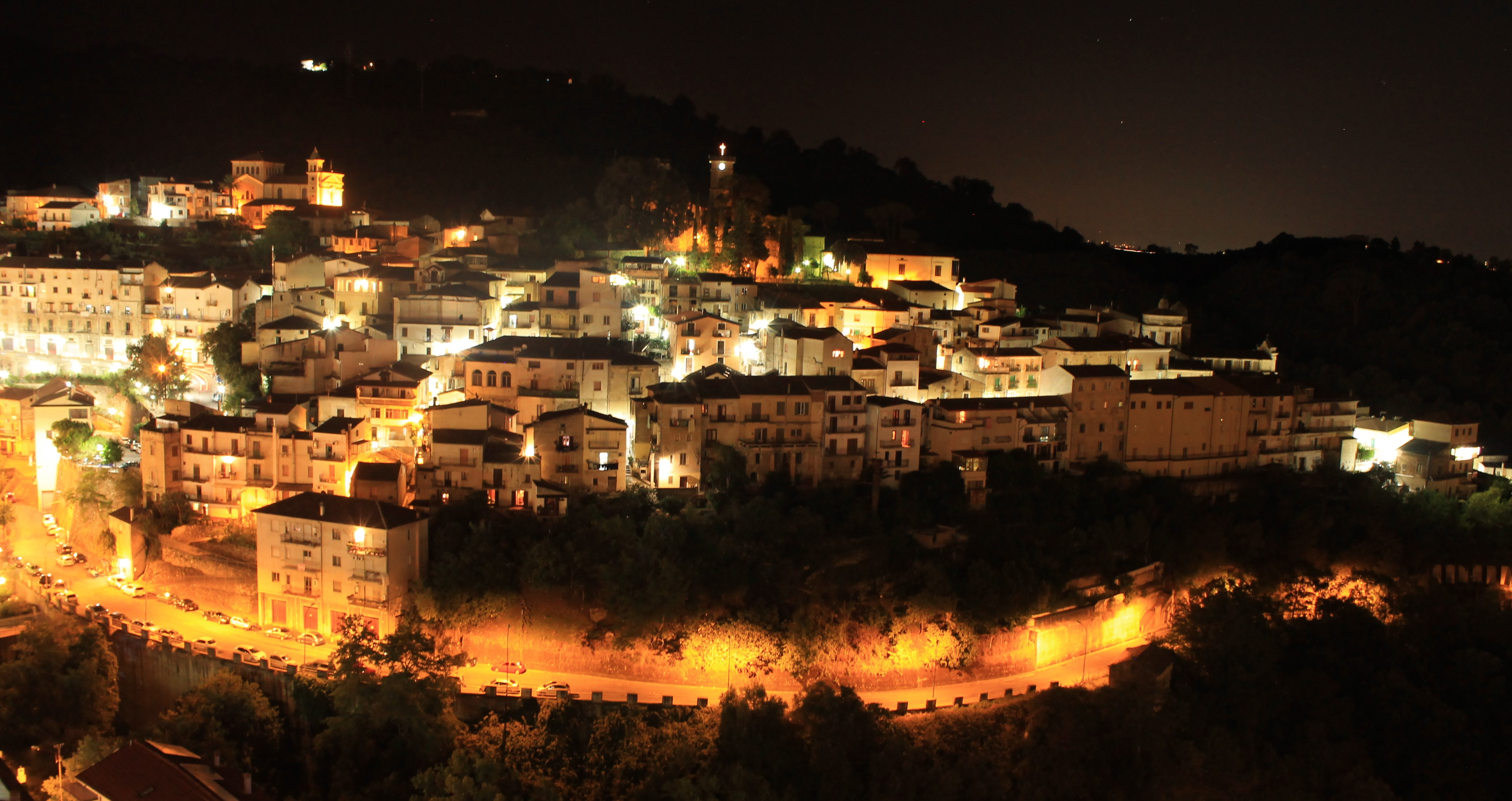

- Location within Italy Location within Calabria
- Coordinates: 39°27′N 16°17′E
- Country: Italy
- Region: Calabria
- Province: Cosenza (CS)
- Frazioni: Cavoni, Petrine, Serra Civita, Timparello

Government
  - Mayor: Federico Umberto

Area
  - Total: 77.6 km^{2} (30.0 sq mi)
- Elevation: 375 m (1,230 ft)

Population (2021)
  - Total: 6,000~
  - Density: 77/km^{2} (200/sq mi)
- Demonym: Luzzesi
- Time zone: UTC+1 (CET)
  - Summer (DST): UTC+2 (CEST)
- Postal code: 87040
- Dialing code: 0984
- Patron saint: Immaculate Conception and St. Francis of Paola
- Saint day: 12 February, 2 April
- Website: Official website

Luzzi (Calabrian: I Lùzzi) is a town and comune in the province of Cosenza in the Calabria region of southern Italy.
