= Montegiordano =

- Comune
- Comune di Montegiordano
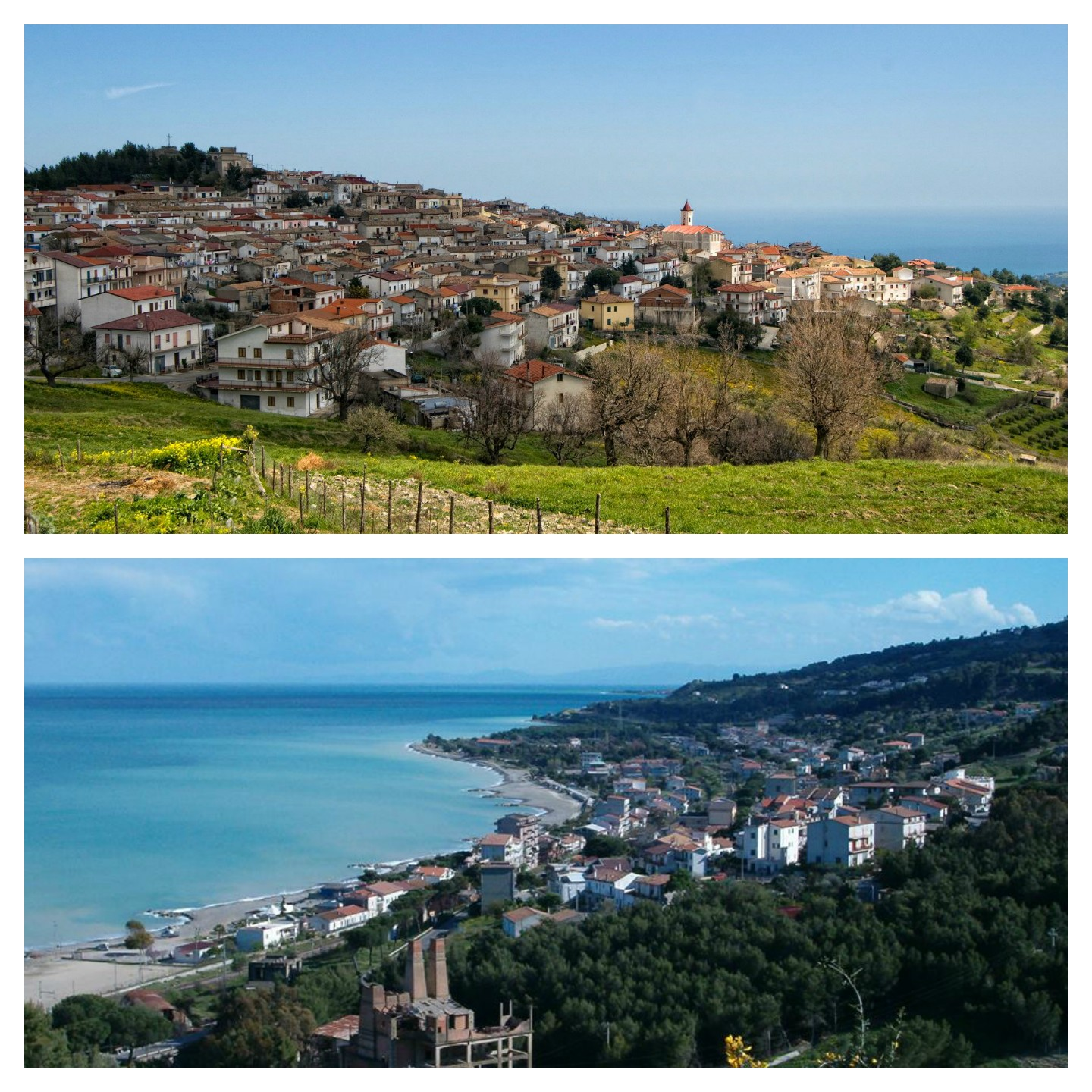

- Location within Italy Location within Calabria
- Coordinates: 40°3′N 16°32′E
- Country: Italy
- Region: Calabria
- Province: Cosenza (CS)
- Frazioni: Montegiordano Marina, Mandrone.

Government
  - Mayor: Rocco Introcaso

Area
  - Total: 35 km^{2} (14 sq mi)
- Elevation: 619 m (2,031 ft)

Population (2008)
  - Total: 2,047
  - Density: 58/km^{2} (150/sq mi)
- Demonym: Montegiordanesi
- Time zone: UTC+1 (CET)
  - Summer (DST): UTC+2 (CEST)
- Postal code: 87070
- Dialing code: 0981
- Patron saint: St. Anthony of Padua
- Saint day: 13 June
- Website: Official website

Montegiordano is a town and comune in the province of Cosenza in the Calabria region of southern Italy.
