= Maierà =

Maierà Greek: Maherás
- Comune
- Comune di Maierà
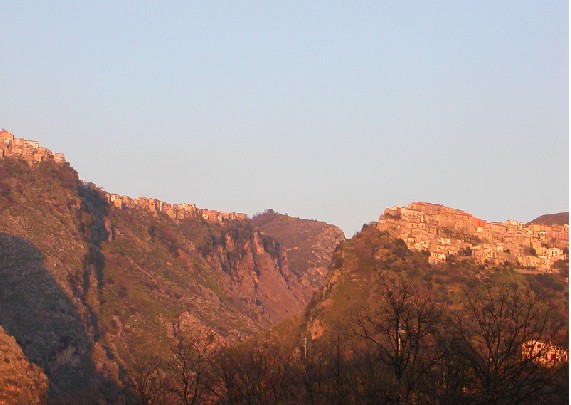

- Location within Italy Location within Calabria
- Coordinates: 39°43′N 15°51′E
- Country: Italy
- Region: Calabria
- Province: Cosenza (CS)

Government
  - Mayor: Giacomo De Marco

Area
  - Total: 17.78 km^{2} (6.86 sq mi)
- Elevation: 360 m (1,180 ft)

Population (31 December 2018)
  - Total: 1,219
  - Density: 68.56/km^{2} (177.6/sq mi)
- Demonym: Majeraioti
- Time zone: UTC+1 (CET)
  - Summer (DST): UTC+2 (CEST)
- Postal code: 87020
- Dialing code: 0985
- ISTAT code: 078071
- Patron saint: Madonna del Carmine
- Saint day: 16 July
- Website: Official website

Maierà is a town and comune in the province of Cosenza in the Calabria region of southern Italy.
