= Bianchi, Calabria =

Town in Calabria, Italy

Bianchi
- Comune
- Comune di Bianchi
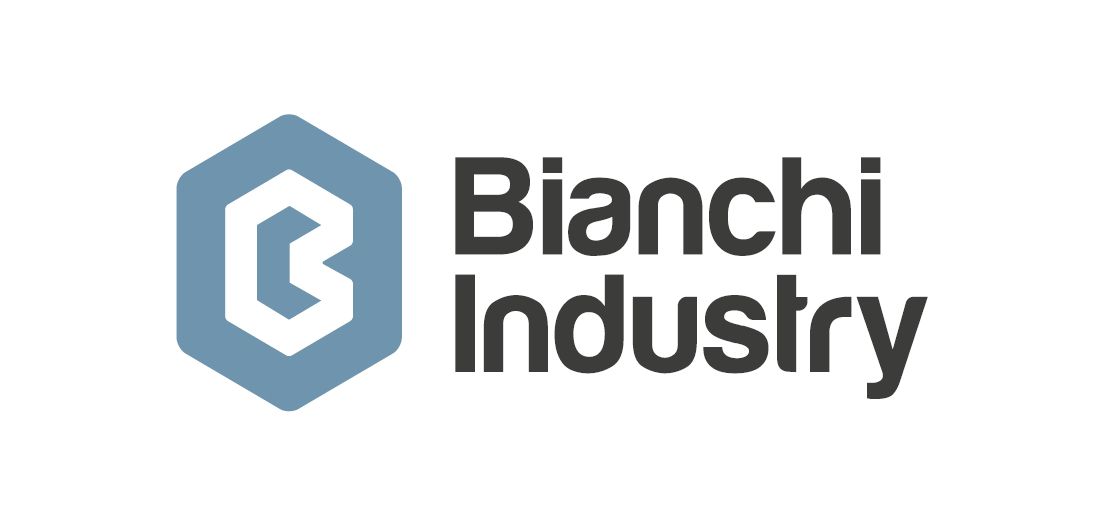
- Coat of arms

- Location within Italy Location within Calabria
- Coordinates: 39°6′N 16°25′E
- Country: Italy
- Region: Calabria
- Province: Cosenza (CS)

Government
  - Mayor: Pasquale Taverna

Area
  - Total: 33.32 km^{2} (12.86 sq mi)
- Elevation: 825 m (2,707 ft)

Population (30 April 2017)
  - Total: 1,281
  - Density: 38.45/km^{2} (99.57/sq mi)
- Demonym: Biancari
- Time zone: UTC+1 (CET)
  - Summer (DST): UTC+2 (CEST)
- Postal code: 87050
- Dialing code: 0984
- Website: Official website

Bianchi (Calabrian: I Biànchi) is a town and comune in the province of Cosenza in the Calabria region of southern Italy.
