= Caloveto =

Caloveto Greek: Kalyvítes
- Comune
- Comune di Caloveto
- Location within Italy Location within Calabria
- Coordinates: 39°30′N 16°46′E
- Country: Italy
- Region: Calabria
- Province: Cosenza (CS)

Government
  - Mayor: Umberto Mazza

Area
  - Total: 24.96 km^{2} (9.64 sq mi)
- Elevation: 385 m (1,263 ft)

Population (2018-01-01)
  - Total: 1,431
  - Density: 57.33/km^{2} (148.5/sq mi)
- Demonym: Calovetesi
- Time zone: UTC+1 (CET)
  - Summer (DST): UTC+2 (CEST)
- Postal code: 87060
- Dialing code: 0983
- Website: Official website

Caloveto (Calabrian: Calëvìtë) is a town and comune in the province of Cosenza in the Calabria region of southern Italy.
