= San Lorenzo del Vallo =

- Comune
- Comune di San Lorenzo del Vallo
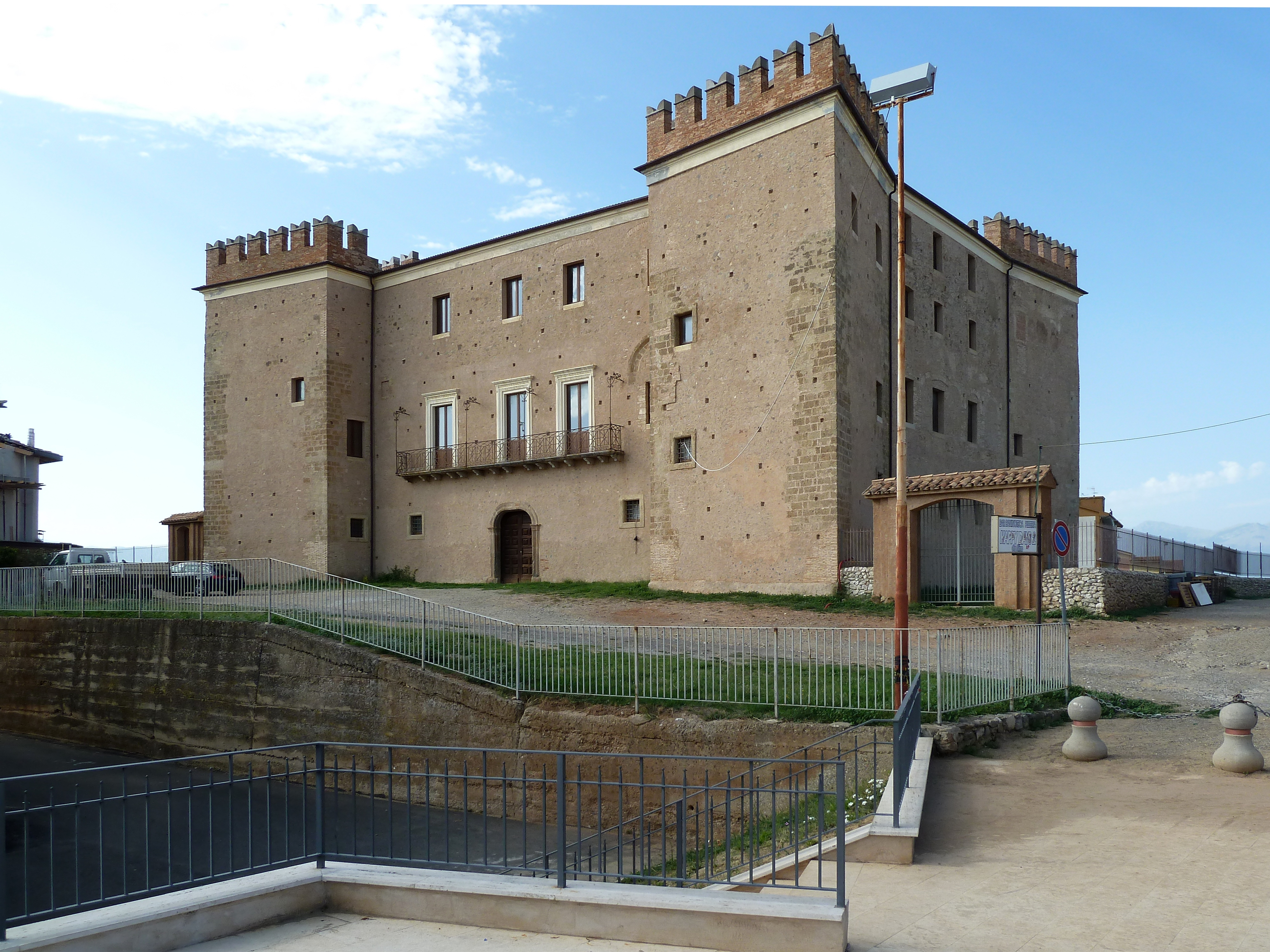

- Coat of arms

- Location within Italy Location within Calabria
- Coordinates: 39°40′N 16°18′E
- Country: Italy
- Region: Calabria
- Province: Cosenza (CS)
- Frazioni: Fedula

Government
  - Mayor: Vincenzo Rimoli

Area
  - Total: 22 km^{2} (8.5 sq mi)
- Elevation: 365 m (1,198 ft)

Population (31 May 2010)
  - Total: 3,521
  - Density: 160/km^{2} (410/sq mi)
- Demonym: Sanlorenzani
- Time zone: UTC+1 (CET)
  - Summer (DST): UTC+2 (CEST)
- Postal code: 87040
- Dialing code: 0981
- Patron saint: St. Lawrence
- Website: Official website

San Lorenzo del Vallo (Arbëreshë Albanian: Sullarënxa) is an Arbëreshë town and comune in the province of Cosenza in the Calabria region of southern Italy.
