= Pietrapaola =

- Comune
- Comune di Pietrapaola
- Location within Italy Location within Calabria
- Coordinates: 39°29′N 16°49′E
- Country: Italy
- Region: Calabria
- Province: Cosenza (CS)

Government
  - Mayor: Manuela Labonia

Area
  - Total: 52 km^{2} (20 sq mi)
- Elevation: 375 m (1,230 ft)

Population (2018-01-01)
  - Total: 1,232
  - Density: 24/km^{2} (61/sq mi)
- Demonym: Pietrapaolesi or Pietropaolesi
- Time zone: UTC+1 (CET)
  - Summer (DST): UTC+2 (CEST)
- Postal code: 87060
- Dialing code: 0983
- Website: Official website

Pietrapaola is a village and comune of the province of Cosenza in the Calabria region of southern Italy.
