= Pietrafitta =

- Comune
- Comune di Pietrafitta
- Location within Italy Location within Calabria
- Coordinates: 39°16′N 16°21′E
- Country: Italy
- Region: Calabria
- Province: Cosenza (CS)

Government
  - Mayor: Antonio Muto

Area
  - Total: 9.24 km^{2} (3.57 sq mi)
- Elevation: 700 m (2,300 ft)

Population (2007)
  - Total: 1,422
  - Density: 154/km^{2} (399/sq mi)
- Demonym: Pietrafittesi
- Time zone: UTC+1 (CET)
  - Summer (DST): UTC+2 (CEST)
- Postal code: 87050
- Dialing code: 0984
- Patron saint: San Nicola di Bari
- Saint day: 6 December
- Website: Official website

Pietrafitta is a town and comune in the province of Cosenza in the Calabria region of southern Italy.
