= Grisolia =

Grisolia Greek: Chrousoléa
- Comune
- Comune di Grisolia
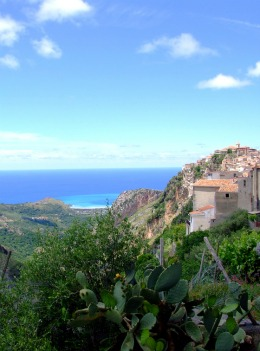

- Location within Italy Location within Calabria
- Coordinates: 39°43′N 15°51′E
- Country: Italy
- Region: Calabria
- Province: Cosenza (CS)

Government
  - Mayor: Antonio Longo

Area
  - Total: 51.75 km^{2} (19.98 sq mi)
- Elevation: 480 m (1,570 ft)

Population (2007)
  - Total: 2,407
  - Density: 46.51/km^{2} (120.5/sq mi)
- Demonym: Grisolioti
- Time zone: UTC+1 (CET)
  - Summer (DST): UTC+2 (CEST)
- Postal code: 87020
- Dialing code: 0985
- Patron saint: St. Anthony of Padua
- Saint day: 13 June
- Website: Official website

Grisolia (Calabrian: Grìsulia) is a town and comune in the province of Cosenza in the Calabria region of southern Italy.
