= Torano Castello =

- Comune
- Comune di Torano Castello
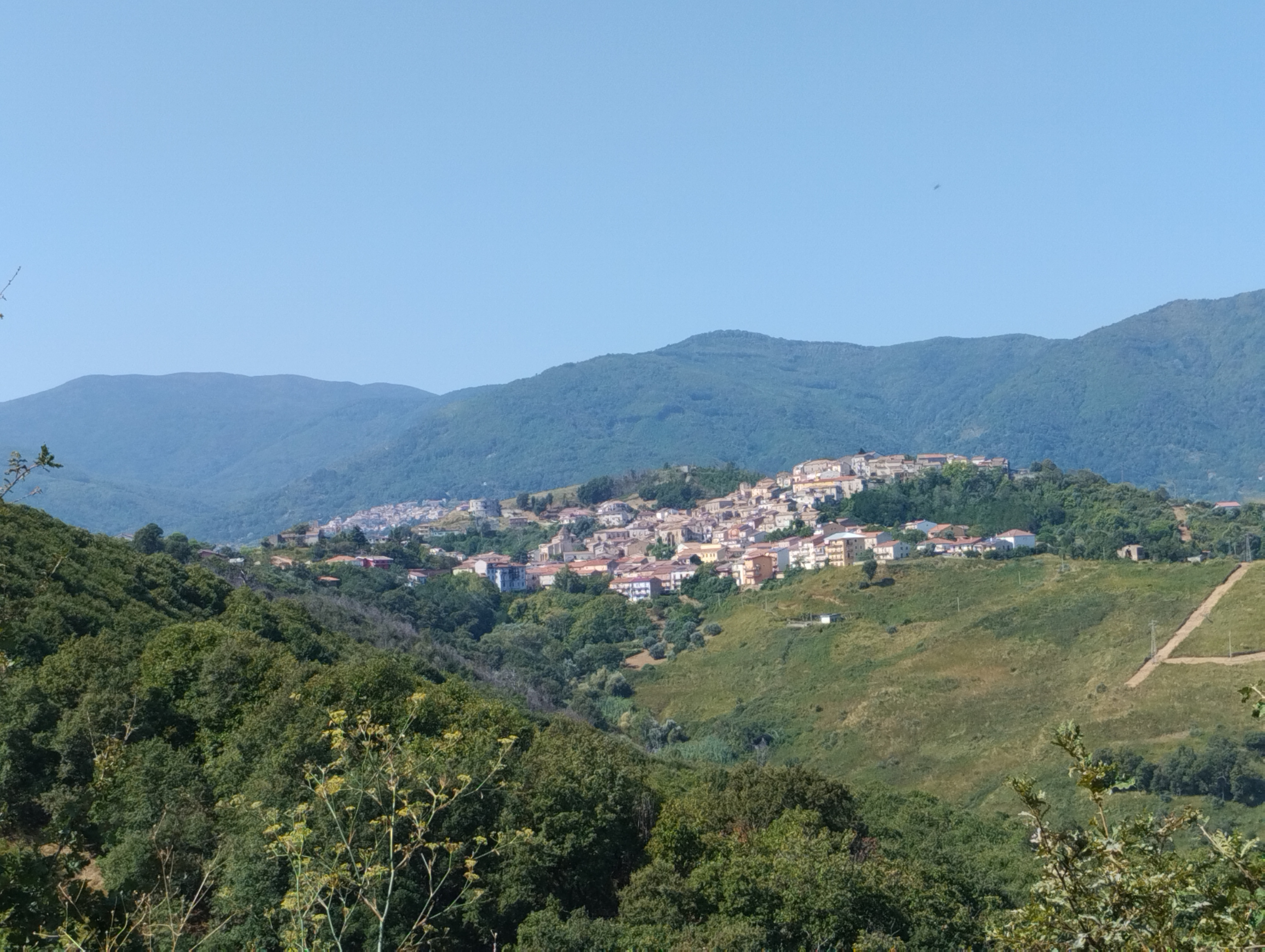

- Location within Italy Location within Calabria
- Coordinates: 39°30′19″N 16°08′49″E
- Country: Italy
- Region: Calabria
- Province: Cosenza (CS)
- Frazioni: Sartano, Torano Scalo

Government
  - Mayor: Lucio Franco Raimondo

Area
  - Total: 30.22 km^{2} (11.67 sq mi)
- Elevation: 370 m (1,210 ft)

Population (30 November 2018)
  - Total: 4,604
  - Density: 152.3/km^{2} (394.6/sq mi)
- Demonym: Toranesi
- Time zone: UTC+1 (CET)
  - Summer (DST): UTC+2 (CEST)
- Postal code: 87010
- Dialing code: 0984
- Patron saint: St. Blaise
- Saint day: 3 February
- Website: Official website

Torano Castello is a town and comune in the province of Cosenza in the Calabria region of southern Italy.

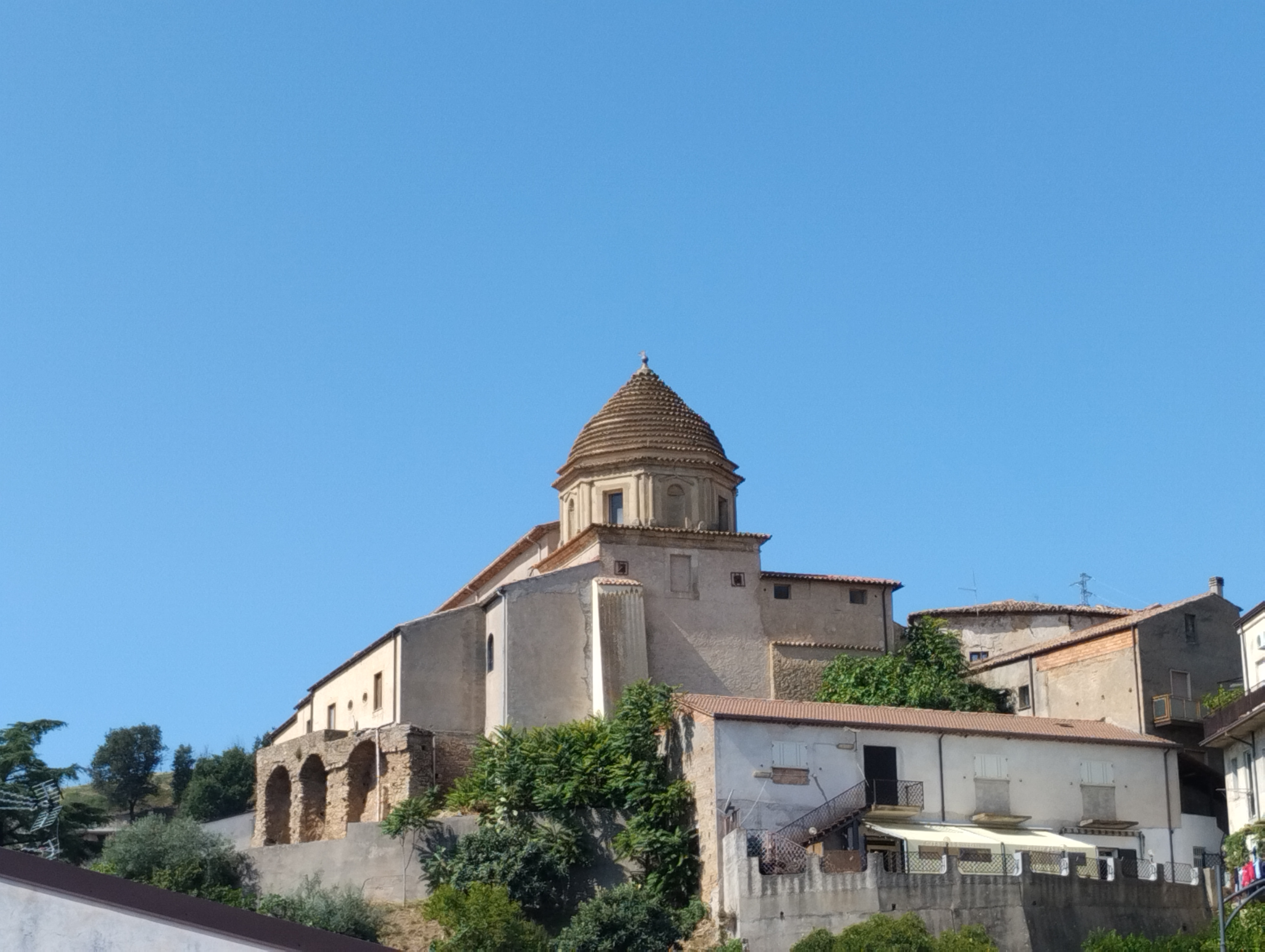
Chiesa di San Biagio
