= Dipignano =

- Comune
- Comune di Dipignano
- Location within Italy Location within Calabria
- Coordinates: 39°14′N 16°15′E
- Country: Italy
- Region: Calabria
- Province: Cosenza (CS)
- Frazioni: Basso, Capocasale, Cappuccini, Croce, Doviziosi, Laurignano, Brunetta, Molino Irto, Petrone, Pozzillo, Puzzillo, Santa Maria, Tessano

Government
  - Mayor: Giuseppe Nicoletti

Area
  - Total: 23.37 km^{2} (9.02 sq mi)
- Elevation: 720 m (2,360 ft)

Population (31 July 2017)
  - Total: 4,351
  - Density: 186.2/km^{2} (482.2/sq mi)
- Demonym: Dipignanesi
- Time zone: UTC+1 (CET)
  - Summer (DST): UTC+2 (CEST)
- Postal code: 87045
- Dialing code: 0984
- Patron saint: St. Nicholas of Bari
- Saint day: 6 December
- Website: Official website

Dipignano is a town and comune in the province of Cosenza in the Calabria region of southern Italy.
