= Aieta =

Aieta Aetós
- Comune
- Comune di Aieta
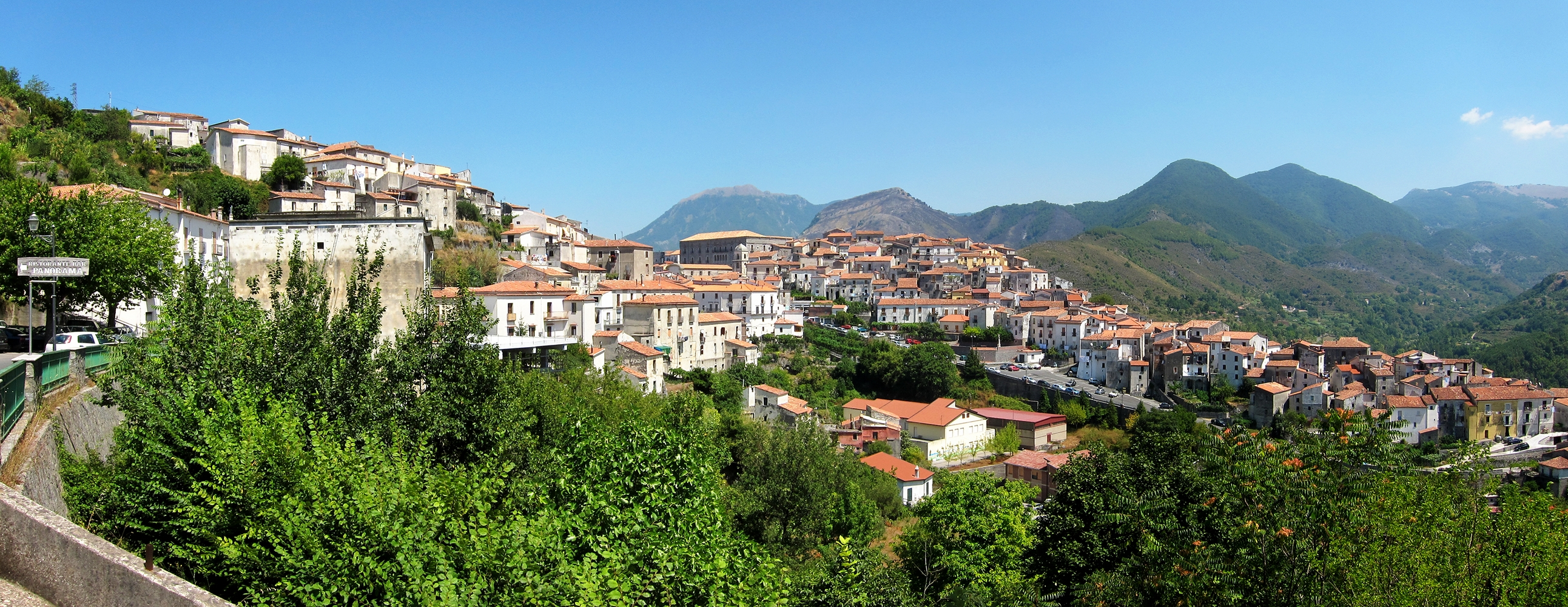
- View of Aieta

- Location within Italy Location within Calabria
- Coordinates: 39°56′N 15°49′E
- Country: Italy
- Region: Calabria
- Province: Cosenza (CS)

Government
  - Mayor: Gennaro Marsiglia

Area
  - Total: 48.3 km^{2} (18.6 sq mi)
- Elevation: 524 m (1,719 ft)

Population (31 December 2018)
  - Total: 809
  - Density: 16.7/km^{2} (43.4/sq mi)
- Demonym: Aietani
- Time zone: UTC+1 (CET)
  - Summer (DST): UTC+2 (CEST)
- Postal code: 87020
- Dialing code: 0985
- Patron saint: St. Vitus
- Website: Official website

Aieta is a town and comune in the province of Cosenza in the Calabria region of southern Italy. The name of the town comes from the Greek term aetòs, αετός, meaning "eagle". The town is located within the Pollino National Park, and its historical center is at 524 metres of altitude. It is one of I Borghi più belli d'Italia ("The most beautiful villages of Italy").
