= Paludi =

- Comune
- Comune di Paludi
- Location within Italy Location within Calabria
- Coordinates: 39°31′50″N 16°40′50″E
- Country: Italy
- Region: Calabria
- Province: Cosenza (CS)

Government
  - Mayor: Stefano Graziano

Area
  - Total: 41.74 km^{2} (16.12 sq mi)
- Elevation: 430 m (1,410 ft)

Population (2018-01-01)
  - Total: 1,950
  - Density: 46.7/km^{2} (121/sq mi)
- Demonym: Paludesi
- Time zone: UTC+1 (CET)
  - Summer (DST): UTC+2 (CEST)
- Postal code: 87060
- Dialing code: 0983
- Website: Official website

Paludi (Calabrian: Palùrë) is a village and comune in the province of Cosenza in the Calabria region of southern Italy.
