= Terravecchia =

- Comune
- Comune di Terravecchia
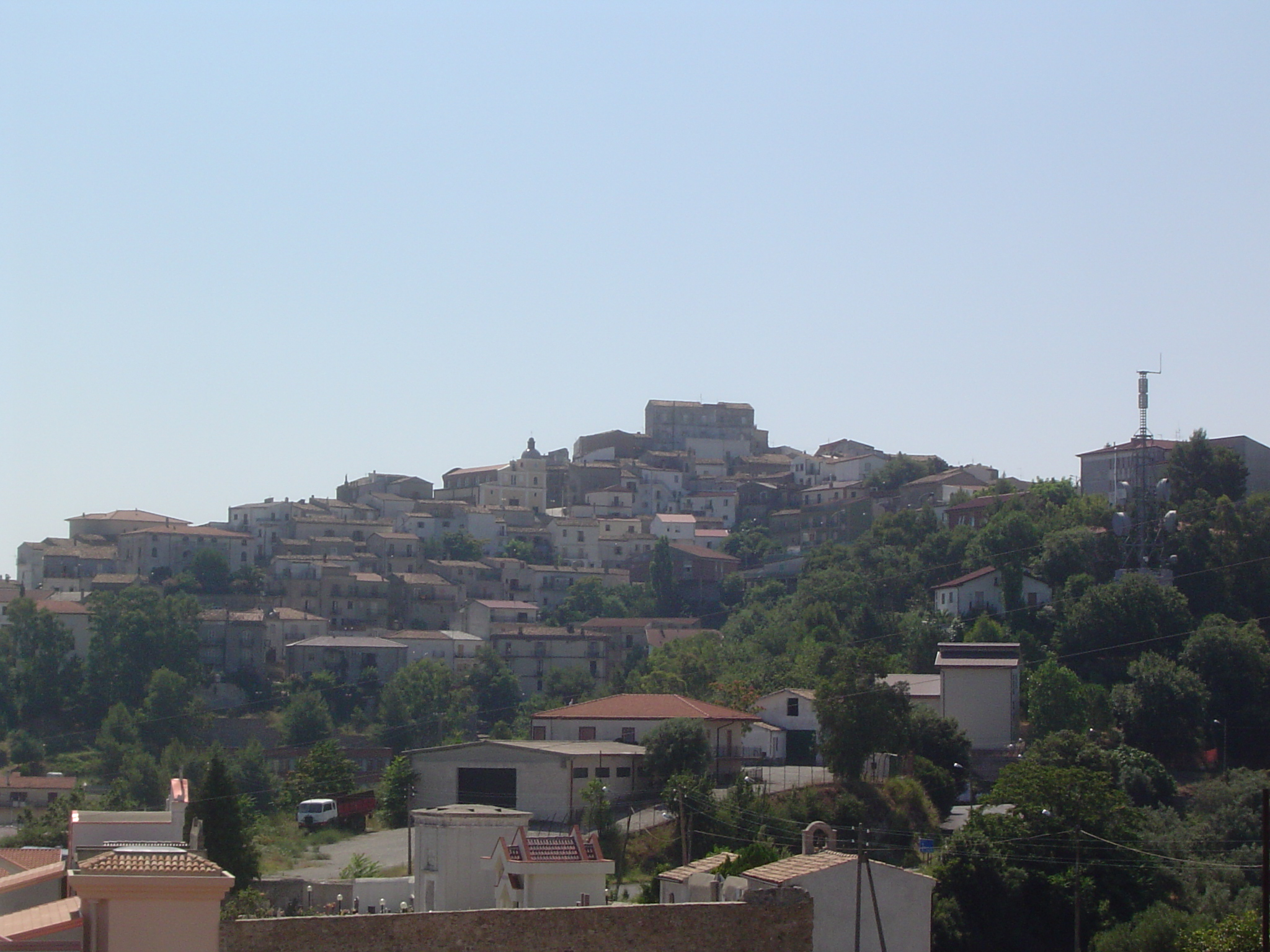

- Location within Italy Location within Calabria
- Coordinates: 39°28′N 16°57′E
- Country: Italy
- Region: Calabria
- Province: Cosenza (CS)

Government
  - Mayor: Mauro Santro

Area
  - Total: 20 km^{2} (7.7 sq mi)
- Elevation: 472 m (1,549 ft)

Population (2018-01-01)
  - Total: 1,135
  - Density: 57/km^{2} (150/sq mi)
- Demonym: Terravecchiesi
- Time zone: UTC+1 (CET)
  - Summer (DST): UTC+2 (CEST)
- Postal code: 87060
- Dialing code: 0983
- Patron saint: Santa Maria del Carmine
- Saint day: Tuesday following Easter
- Website: Official website

Terravecchia is a village and comune in the province of Cosenza in the Calabria region of southern Italy.

== Geography ==
The village is bordered by Cariati, Crucoli and Scala Coeli. Terravecchia is perched atop a hill approximately 3 kilometers SSW of the Ionian Sea coast.

== Demographics ==
Historical population

Year	Pop.	±%
1861	823	—
1871	899	+9.2%
1881	985	+9.6%
1901	1,219	+23.8%
1911	1,336	+9.6%
1921	1,360	+1.8%
1931	1,326	−2.5%
1936	1,327	+0.1%

Year	Pop.	±%
1951	1,660	+25.1%
1961	1,635	−1.5%
1971	1,508	−7.8%
1981	1,755	+16.4%
1991	1,506	−14.2%
2001	1,135	−24.6%
2011	1,019	−10.2%
2021	610	−40.1%

Source: ISTAT
