= Rota Greca =

Rota Greca Greek: Róta
- Comune
- Comune di Rota Greca
- Location within Italy Location within Calabria
- Coordinates: 39°28′N 16°7′E
- Country: Italy
- Region: Calabria
- Province: Cosenza (CS)

Government
  - Mayor: Giuseppe De Monte

Area
  - Total: 13.12 km^{2} (5.07 sq mi)
- Elevation: 510 m (1,670 ft)

Population (30 June 2018)
  - Total: 1,100
  - Density: 84/km^{2} (220/sq mi)
- Demonym: Rotesi
- Time zone: UTC+1 (CET)
  - Summer (DST): UTC+2 (CEST)
- Postal code: 87010
- Dialing code: 0984
- Patron saint: Assumption of Mary
- Saint day: 15 August
- Website: Official website

Rota Greca (Albanian: Rrota) is an Arbëreshë town and comune in the province of Cosenza in the Calabria region of southern Italy.
