= Bocchigliero =

- Comune
- Comune di Bocchigliero
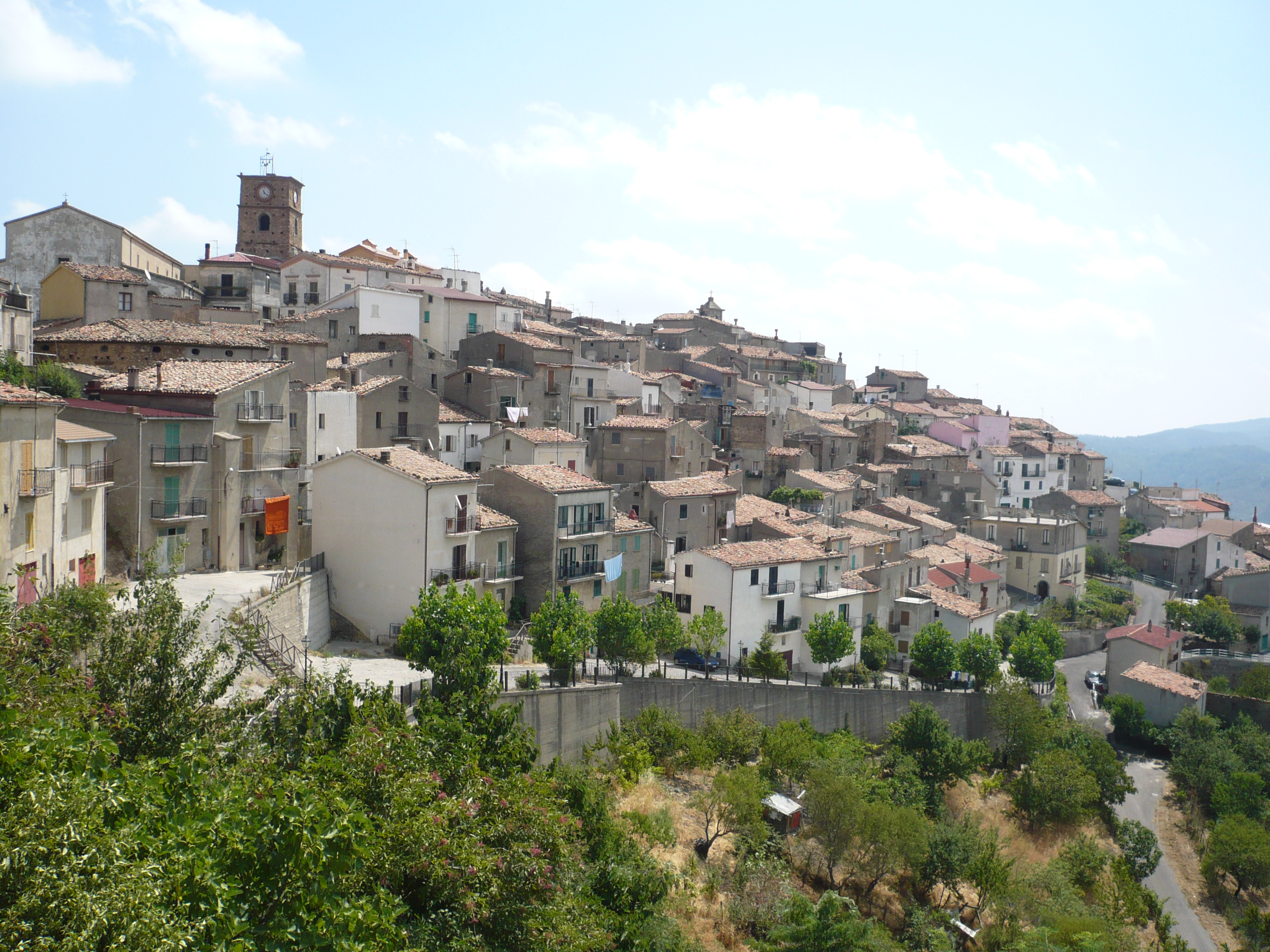
- The view of Bocchigliero

- Location within Italy Location within Calabria
- Coordinates: 39°25′N 16°45′E
- Country: Italy
- Region: Calabria
- Province: Cosenza (CS)
- Frazioni: Calamitti

Area
  - Total: 97 km^{2} (37 sq mi)
- Elevation: 1,100 m (3,600 ft)

Population (2018-01-01)
  - Total: 1,895
  - Density: 20/km^{2} (51/sq mi)
- Demonym: Bocchiglieresi
- Time zone: UTC+1 (CET)
  - Summer (DST): UTC+2 (CEST)
- Postal code: 87060
- Dialing code: 0983
- Patron saint: San Nicola
- Saint day: 21 August
- Website: Official website

Bocchigliero (Calabrian: Vucchigliari or Vuccugliari) is a town and comune in the province of Cosenza in the Calabria region of southern Italy.
