= Albidona =

- Comune
- Comune di Albidona
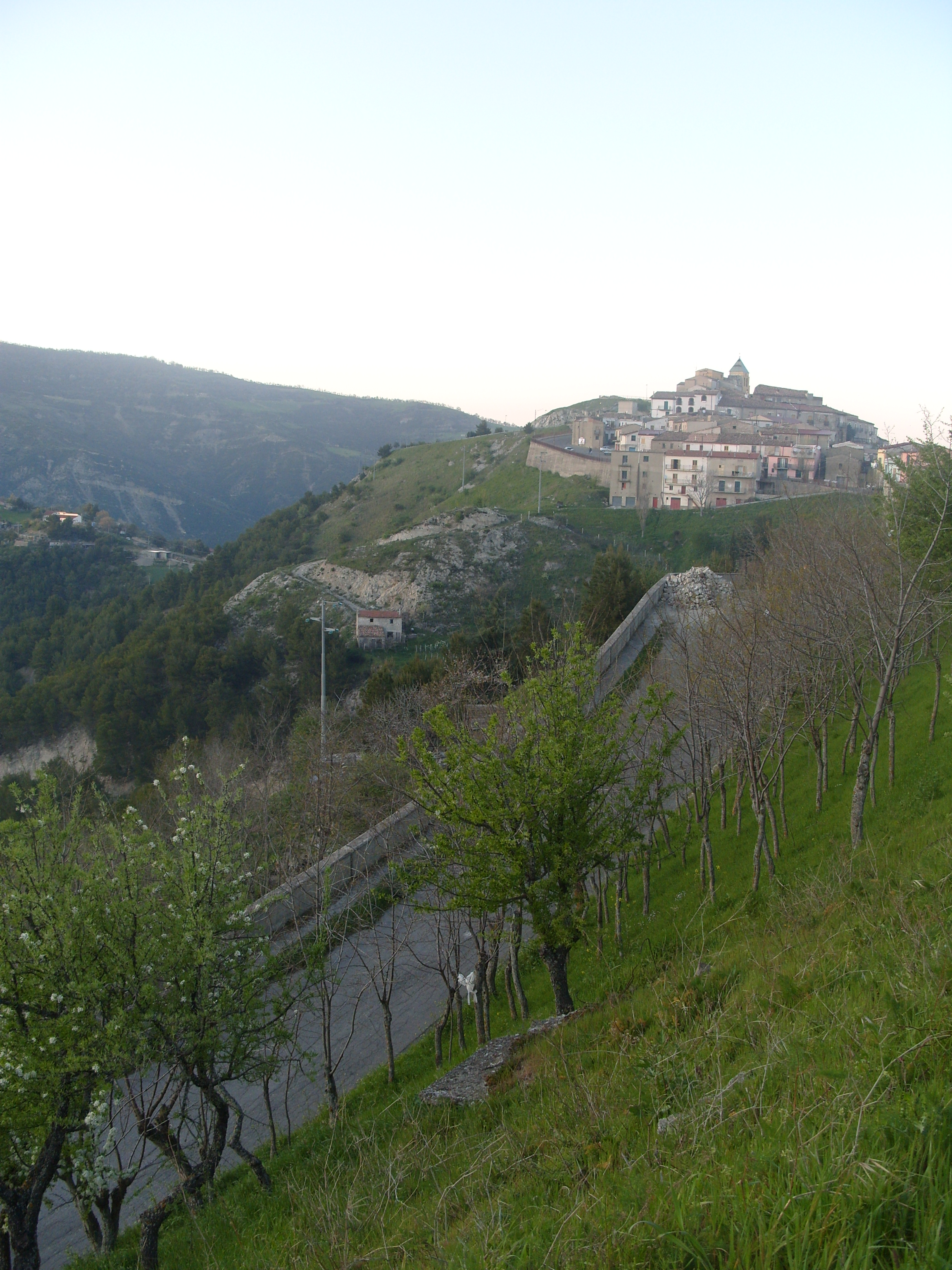
- View of the old town

- Location within Italy Location within Calabria
- Coordinates: 39°55′N 16°28′E
- Country: Italy
- Region: Calabria
- Province: Cosenza (CS)

Government
  - Mayor: Filomena Di Palma

Area
  - Total: 63.71 km^{2} (24.60 sq mi)
- Elevation: 810 m (2,660 ft)

Population (30 November 2018)
  - Total: 1,273
  - Density: 19.98/km^{2} (51.75/sq mi)
- Demonym: Albidonesi
- Time zone: UTC+1 (CET)
  - Summer (DST): UTC+2 (CEST)
- Postal code: 87070
- Dialing code: 0981
- ISTAT code: 078006
- Patron saint: St. Michael Archangel
- Saint day: 8 May

Albidona (Albidonese: Albdòn) is a town and comune in the province of Cosenza in the Calabria region of southern Italy. It is located between the Ionian Sea and the mountains of Pollino National Park, at 11 km from the sea and 18 km from the mountains.

== History ==
Ancient historians Lycophron and Strabo report that Albidona was founded on the ruins of Leutarnia, an old and large city of Greater Greece by the fortune-teller Calchas, returning from the Trojan War. The oldest historical information about Albidona dates actually from around the year 1000.

== Main sights ==
- Albidona's Tower: is an old tower built in the 16th century by Don Pedro Álvarez de Toledo to defend the Ionian coastlines by the Saracens. It is placed on a marine hill and is called also Tower of Monks because the tower was owned to the monks in the 17th century. Today it is owned to a private family.
- Mostarico: is a mountain high 743 m, that has a beautiful landscape towards the Gulf of Taranto and Plain of Sibari.
- Church of San Michele Arcangelo
- Church of Sant'Antonio di Padova
- Church of San Rocco
- Church of Madonna della Pietà
- Church of Madonna del Cafaro
- War memorial (Monumento ai Caduti di tutte le guerre): is the first memorial war erected in Calabria. Built by the sculptor M. Pelletti, it was erected in 1966. In 2004 the memorial was restored and the original marble pedestal was replaced by a boulder, which supports a statue of "Milite Ignoto".

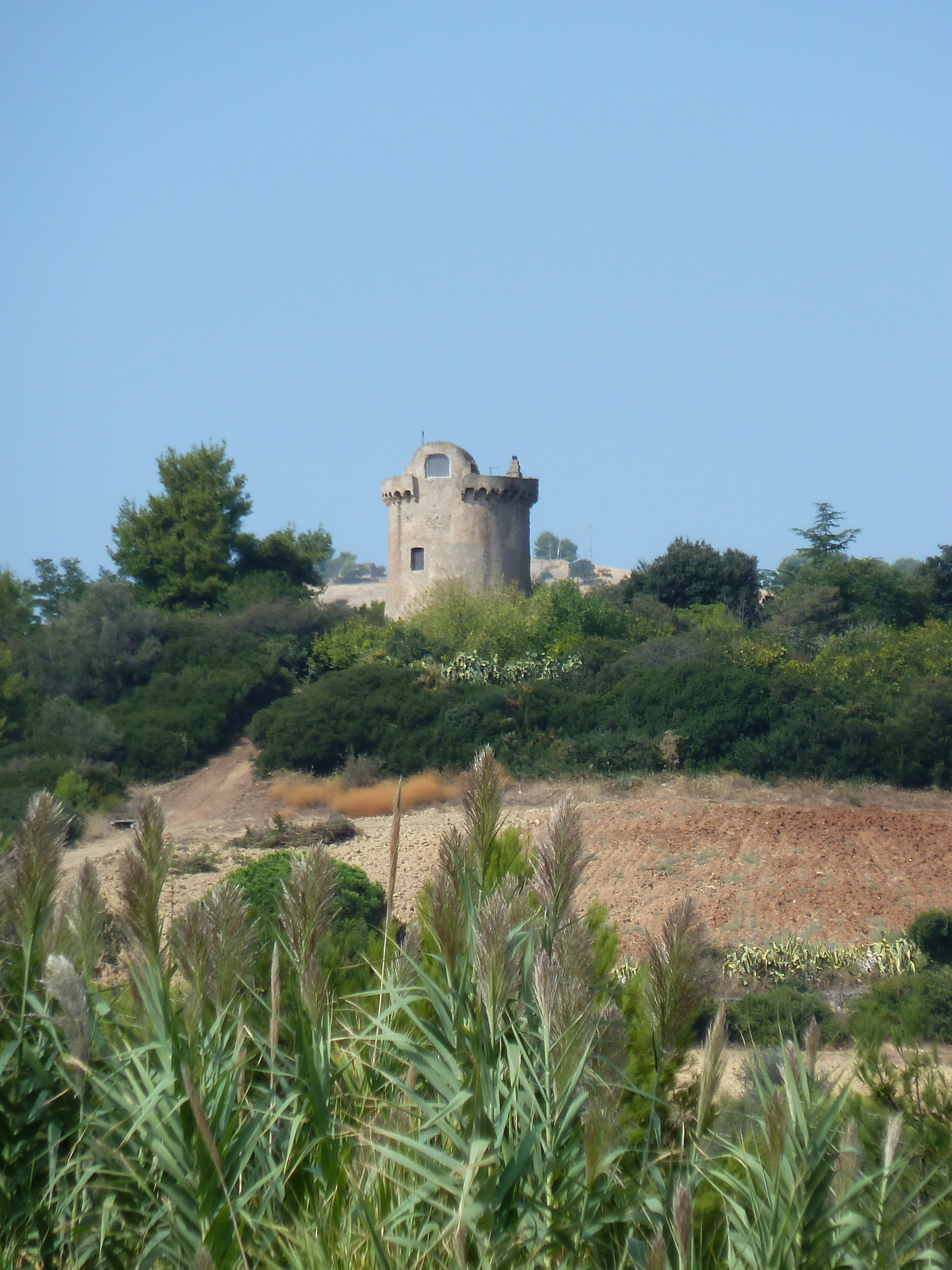
Tower of Albidona.
