= Amendolara =

Amendolara Greek: Amygdalariá
- Comune
- Comune di Amendolara
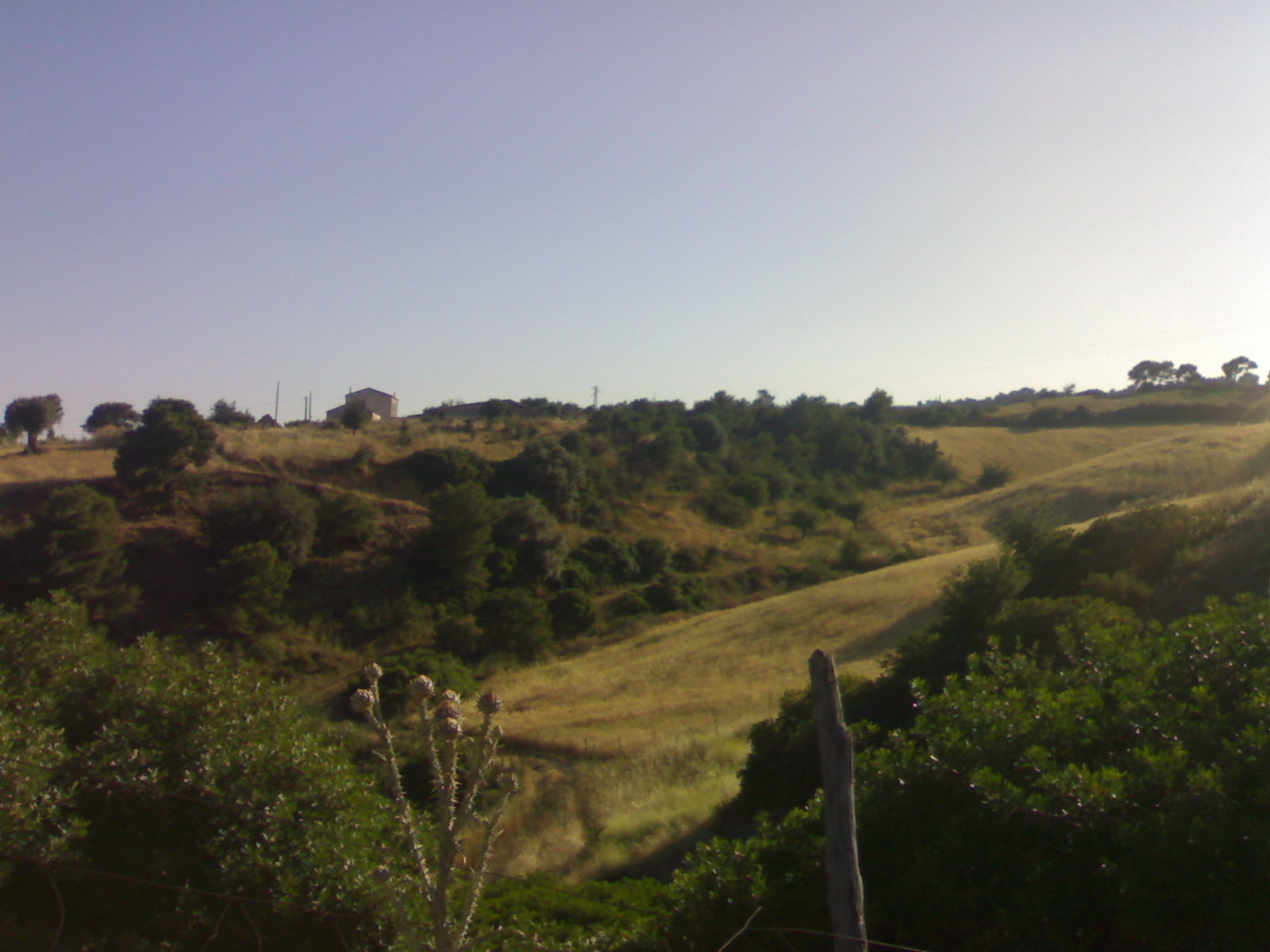

- Location within Italy Location within Calabria
- Coordinates: 39°57′N 16°35′E
- Country: Italy
- Region: Calabria
- Province: Cosenza (CS)
- Frazioni: Marina di Amendolara

Government
  - Mayor: Salvatore Antonello Ciminelli

Area
  - Total: 64.18 km^{2} (24.78 sq mi)
- Elevation: 227 m (745 ft)

Population (2007)
  - Total: 3,167
  - Density: 49.35/km^{2} (127.8/sq mi)
- Demonym: Amendolaresi
- Time zone: UTC+1 (CET)
  - Summer (DST): UTC+2 (CEST)
- Postal code: 87071
- Dialing code: 0981
- Patron saint: St. Vincent Ferrer
- Saint day: April 5
- Website: Official website

Amendolara (Lucano: Minnuàre) is a town and comune in the province of Cosenza in the Calabria region of southern Italy.

The city is at an altitude of 200 meters above sea level and overlooks the Ionian Sea.

== History ==
The name probably derives from the Latin Amygdalaria (mandorlai), due to the area's high production of almonds. Based on archaeological sites in the area, it is believed that the territory was already inhabited in the Neolithic period (6000-4000 BC) and that the human presence became stable in the Proto-historic age (3500-3000 BC) when a community settled in the area of today's Old District (Rione Vecchio).

With the foundation of Sybaris by the Achaeans, the population that inhabited the area of the Old District in the seventh century BC moved to the wide area of San Nicola. In this place was built a new city, called Lagaria.

After the Roman rule, Amendolara was mostly a religious center, first under the Byzantines, then with the establishment of Cistercians monks, as evidenced by the many churches and hermits' caves located in the territory. A castle was built here around 1000 AD.

In the 16th century, the Dominicans built a convent and the so-called "Torre Spaccata" ("Split tower"). For two centuries there were battles between feudal lords and the city for the conquest of the land confiscated during the feudal period. In the 18th century, the lots became real farms and were divided between the municipality and the state, which sold them to the representatives of the most powerful middle-class families.

During the 19th century, Amendolara was a viable center for the dissemination of liberal ideas, but it is also suffered the plundering of the most important works of art contained in the churches. In 1848 the population was mostly living in poverty and they rebelled against the landowners occupying the lands of Straface. Poverty and unemployment led to a significant migration to Argentina and northern Italy which lasted for nearly a century.

== Cuisine ==
The food is a strong tradition and cultural tourist attraction of the place. It actively contributes to the local economy and society. The cuisine is simple, genuine, and uses local vegetables. The culinary tradition of Amendolara puts is based on agriculture of the "Alto Jonio Cosentino", and is characterized by the use of basic ingredients in common with the area of Sibari.

A common first course is rascjcatilli, fresh pasta made with flour and water in the form of small pieces plucked with the fingers and topped with fresh tomato sauce and basil or lamb ragout and a sprinkling of chili pepper. Ferrazuoli is fresh pasta in the shape of sticks, gouged with a thin iron square, and topped with meat ragout. Both are peasant dishes, often enhanced by the intense flavor of ricotta cheese and grated flake directly over the plate at time of service.

Typical Christmas desserts include I crispi, made with wheat flour, water and yeast, shaped like big rings, fried in olive oil, and topped with sugar icing. I cannaricoli are big dumplings made of flour, black pepper, wine and a pinch of yeast, then fried in olive oil.

During Easter, it was common to prepare cullura and pastizzi. Cullura is the Easter bread, with an original meaning of new life. The dough is made with flour, eggs, cinnamon, fennel seeds, lard, salt and yeast. The whole is worked and shaped like a crown. Pastizzi are pseudo-pants made with flour, lard, salt and pepper, stuffed with meat and entrails of kid, seasoned with pepper, parsley, and garlic, browned in olive oil with the addition of sausage, then baked in the oven.
