= Panettieri =

- Comune
- Comune di Panettieri
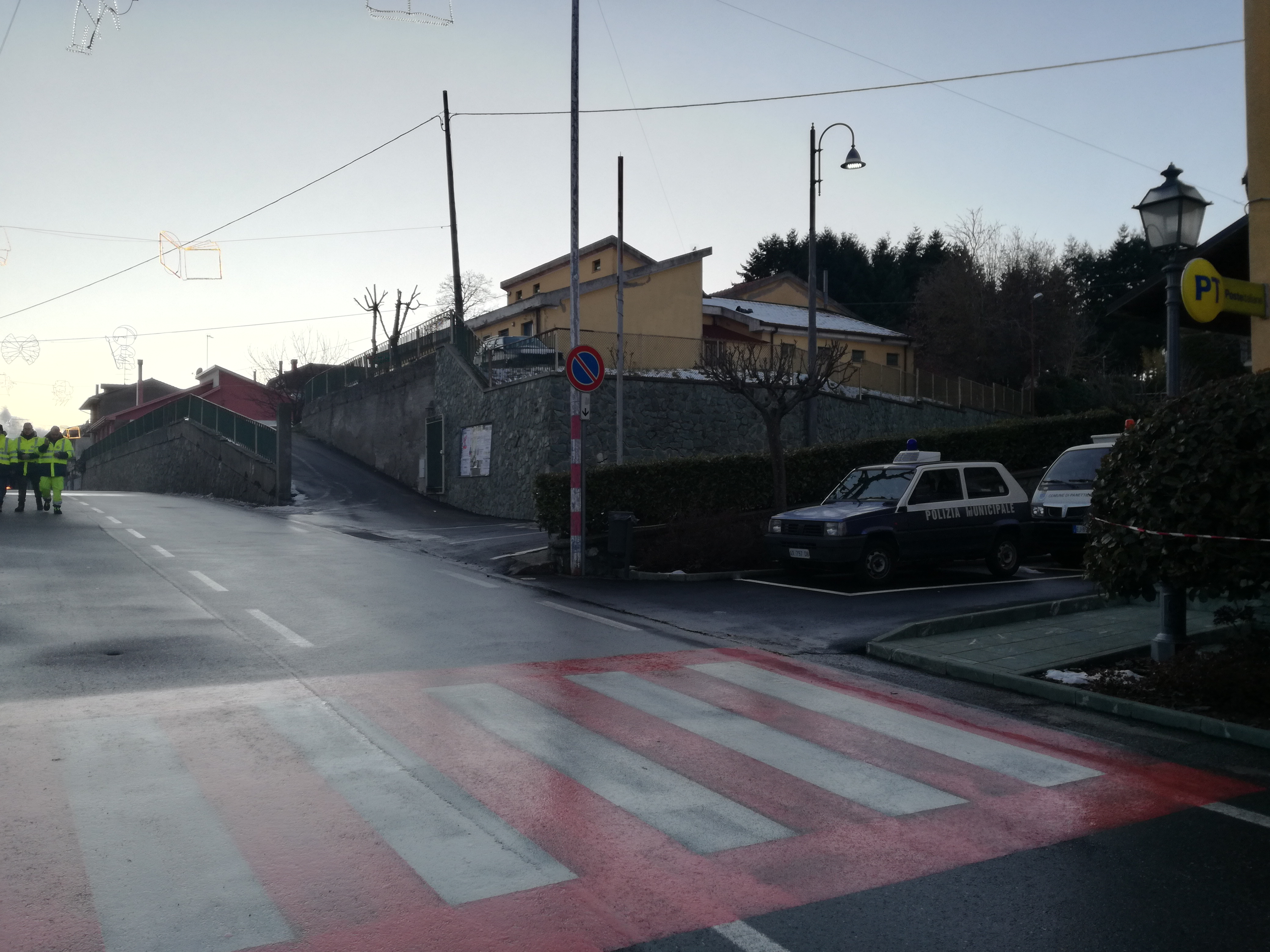

- Location within Italy Location within Calabria
- Coordinates: 39°3′20″N 16°27′15″E
- Country: Italy
- Region: Calabria
- Province: Cosenza (CS)

Government
  - Mayor: Salvatore Parrotta

Area
  - Total: 14.67 km^{2} (5.66 sq mi)
- Elevation: 937 m (3,074 ft)

Population (2018-01-01)
  - Total: 375
  - Density: 25.6/km^{2} (66.2/sq mi)
- Time zone: UTC+1 (CET)
  - Summer (DST): UTC+2 (CEST)
- Postal code: 87050
- Dialing code: 0968
- Patron saint: St. Charles Borromeo
- Website: Official website

Panettieri (Calabrian: Panettìari) is a village and comune in the province of Cosenza in the Calabria region of southern Italy.

Estimates put Panettieri's population between 310 and 330 in 2021.

It was probably founded in the mid-17th century.
