= Campana, Calabria =

Campana Greek: Kampána
- Comune
- Comune di Campana
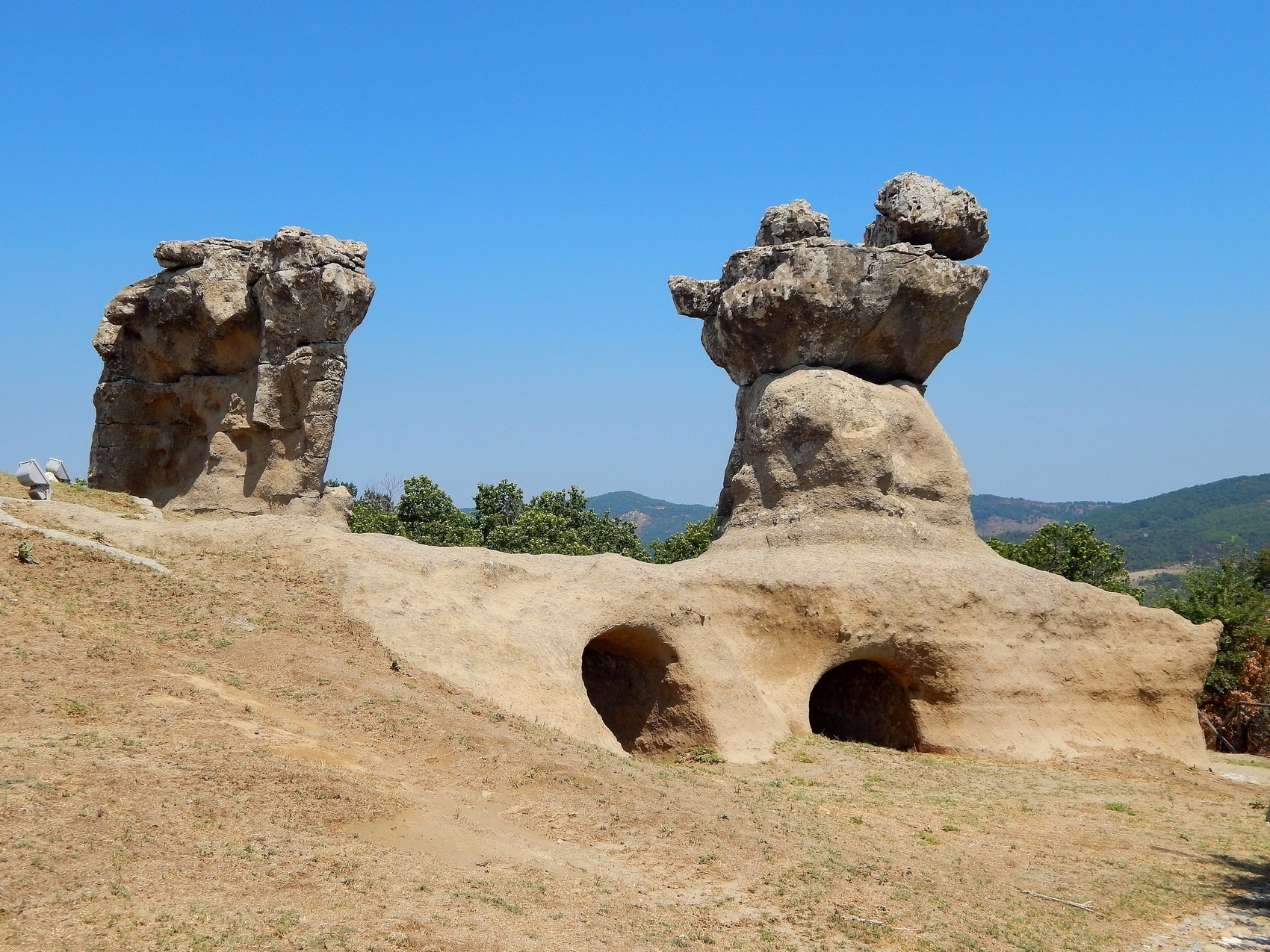
- The so-called "Elephant of Campana"

- Location within Italy Location within Calabria
- Coordinates: 39°25′N 16°49′E
- Country: Italy
- Region: Calabria
- Province: Cosenza (CS)

Government
  - Mayor: Agostino Chiarello

Area
  - Total: 103 km^{2} (40 sq mi)
- Elevation: 617 m (2,024 ft)

Population (2007)
  - Total: 2,111
  - Density: 20.5/km^{2} (53.1/sq mi)
- Demonym: Campanesi
- Time zone: UTC+1 (CET)
  - Summer (DST): UTC+2 (CEST)
- Postal code: 87061
- Dialing code: 0983
- ISTAT code: 078023
- Patron saint: St. Dominic of Guzman
- Saint day: 3 August
- Website: Official website

Campana is a town and comune in the province of Cosenza in the Calabria region of southern Italy.

In the municipal territory, within the Sila National Park are two megaliths (one known as "The Elephant of Campana"), dating from perhaps the 3rd century BC. The first, standing at c. 5,50 m, depicts either an Elephas antiquus, or an elephant from the army of Pyrrhus or Hannibal; the second, missing the upper part, has a height of 7.50 m and was perhaps the lower part of a human statue.{{Citation needed}}
