= Belvedere Marittimo =

- Comune
- Comune di Belvedere Marittimo
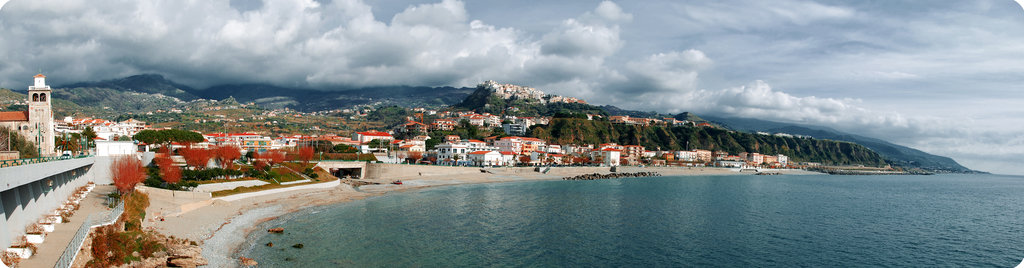

- Location within Italy Location within Calabria
- Coordinates: 39°37′N 15°52′E
- Country: Italy
- Region: Calabria
- Province: Cosenza (CS)
- Frazioni: Laise, Santa Litterata, Trifari, Oracchio, Rocca.

Government
  - Mayor: Commissariata da: Regina Antonella Bardari

Area
  - Total: 37.09 km^{2} (14.32 sq mi)
- Elevation: 150 m (490 ft)

Population (31 December 2018)
  - Total: 11,083
  - Density: 298.8/km^{2} (773.9/sq mi)
- Demonym: Belvederesi
- Time zone: UTC+1 (CET)
  - Summer (DST): UTC+2 (CEST)
- Postal code: 87021
- Dialing code: 0985
- Patron saint: St. Daniel
- Saint day: 13 October
- Website: Official website

Belvedere Marittimo is a town and comune in the province of Cosenza in the Calabria region of southern Italy.

The town is made of two separate urbanized areas also called "paese" and "marina". The first is what is left of the original medieval town, the second was developed in more recent decades and it now represents the center of Belvedere Marittimo's commercial and touristic services.

Its territory covers a stretch of the Tyrrhenian coast.

The origins of the ancient settlement, called Belviderium, are uncertain: the finding of a bronze axe in the 19th century shows that human presence in the area probably dates back to the pre-historic age. Other archeological findings concern Bruttian graves. The first encastellation can be ascribed to the Normans who built the castle on the cliff under Roger the Norman (1031–1101).

Belvedere people were also involved in the Battle of Lepanto (October 7, 1571) during which the mariner and explorer Cecco Pisano distinguished himself. In 1622 the town was given to Tiberio Carafa, the first Prince of Belvedere, after whom the castle, that has always been the heart of the town history, was named.

The town was also the birthplace of Saint Daniel Fasanella who is also the town's patron saint.

== Main sights ==
- The "Castello del Principe" was originally built by the Normans on what is the highest hill by the coast, around the year 1000. The castle was restored and enriched during the Spanish domination to assume the shape and architecture currently visible.
- Monastery of "San Daniele" (16th century)
- "Paolo Emilio" Roman tower
- Church of "Rosario" (Rosary) founded in 1091
- Wooden Crucifix (17th century)

== Events ==
- S.Daniele Festival and street market (13–20 October)
- On May 15, 2008, Belvedere Marittimo was the starting point of the 5th stage of the road bicycle race Giro d'Italia
