= Malvito =

- Comune
- Comune di Malvito
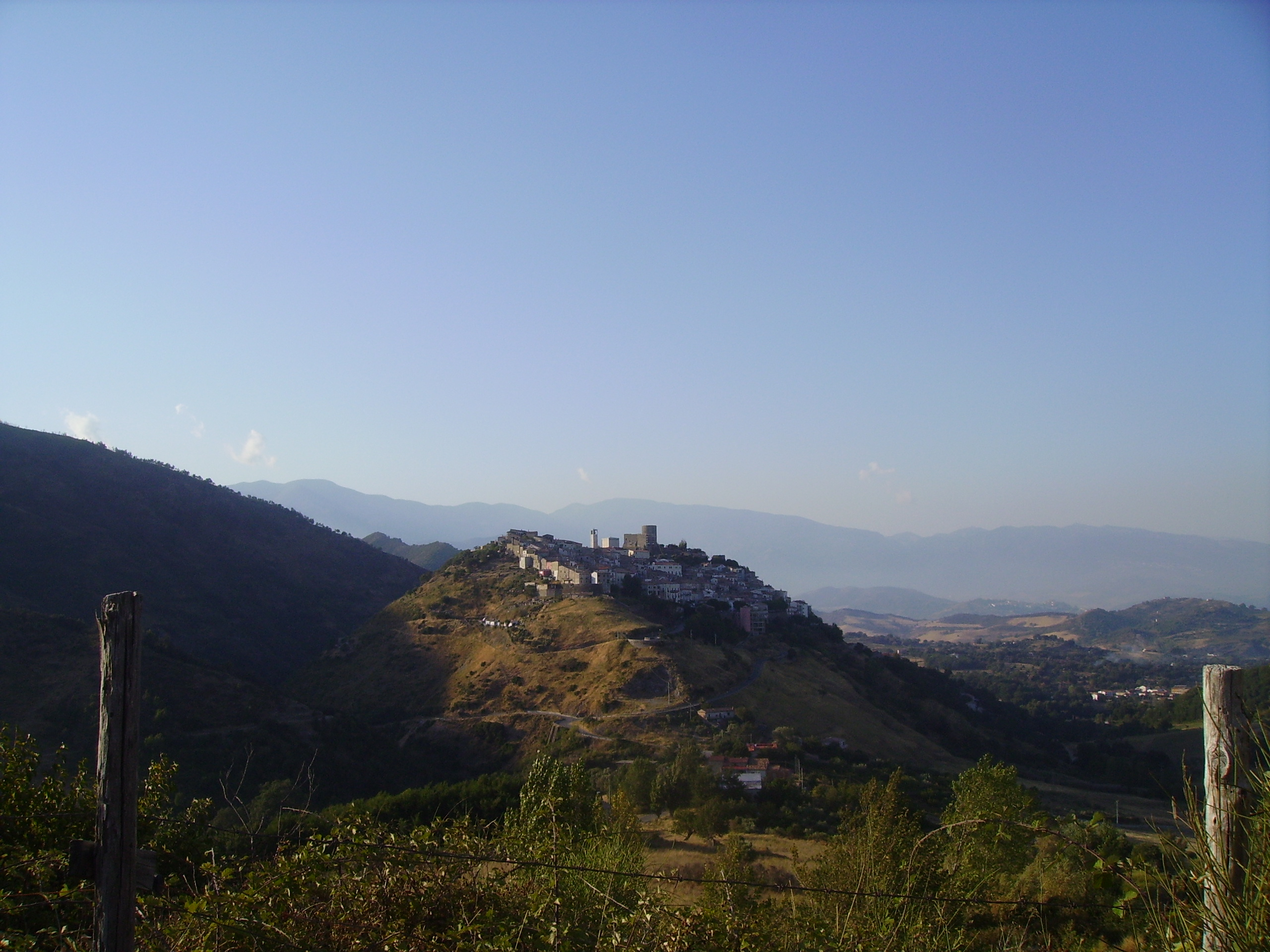

- Location within Italy Location within Calabria
- Coordinates: 39°36′N 16°3′E
- Country: Italy
- Region: Calabria
- Province: Cosenza (CS)
- Frazioni: Pauciuri, Piana, Vaditari

Government
  - Mayor: Pietro Amatuzzo

Area
  - Total: 38.24 km^{2} (14.76 sq mi)
- Elevation: 473 m (1,552 ft)

Population (2018-01-01)
  - Total: 2,071
  - Density: 54.16/km^{2} (140.3/sq mi)
- Demonym: Malvitani
- Time zone: UTC+1 (CET)
  - Summer (DST): UTC+2 (CEST)
- Postal code: 87010
- Dialing code: 0984
- Patron saint: St. Michael Archangel
- Saint day: 29 September
- Website: Official website

Malvito (Calabrian: Marivitu) is a town and comune in the province of Cosenza in the Calabria region of southern Italy.

Its name derives from the Latin word for mallow, malvetum. Its population was severely reduced in the 1950s and 1960s due to mass migration to USA, Australia, Argentina and Canada.

== History ==
Located in the upper Esaro Valley, on the internal side of the Paolana chain, Malvito is identified by some with the ancient Magna Graecia city of Temesa, mentioned in the Odyssey for its copper mines.

The name Malvito seems to derive from the Latin malvetum, meaning “place of mallows”. Formerly located on the borders of the Byzantine Empire, it was the seat of a gastaldato in the Lombard age and had great importance until the Norman period, when it was elevated to a county, as evidenced by the diploma (which was signed in 1083) of Roberto di Scalea, Count of Malvito. It was an episcopal seat from the 9th to the 12th century. Following the arrival of the Normans, also for military reasons, it underwent a process of deconstruction of its ecclesiastical district which led, at the end of the 12th century, to the suppression of the episcopal see and its transfer to San Marco Argentano.

Around the year 1000, Malvito experienced - thanks to the contribution of a community of Greek monks - one of the most favorable moments, becoming an important center of book production. In fact, the writing activity of the monks of the church of Santa Parasceve di Malvito dates back to the year 982, who copied liturgical booklets, now preserved in the Vatican Apostolic Library and considered valuable masterpieces of calligraphic art.

During the Swabian domination Malvito enjoyed the title of state-owned city, as evidenced by the diploma of Frederick II of July 1224 given in Syracuse. But a decisive change took place in 1266 when Charles I of Anjou took the throne from the House of Swabia and entrusted Malvito in 1269 to Nicola de Orta who became its first feudal lord, after a long period in which Malvito enjoyed the royal state property.

In 1497 the Malvitans obtained civic statutes from the Sanseverino princes, i.e. the first written concessions regarding the rights of citizens: a real conquest, since the People could appeal to these rules and norms to limit abuses and arrogance of the local Lords.
