= Sangineto =

- Comune
- Comune di Sangineto
- Location within Italy Location within Calabria
- Coordinates: 39°36′15″N 15°54′51″E
- Country: Italy
- Region: Calabria
- Province: Cosenza (CS)
- Frazioni: Sangineto Lido

Government
  - Mayor: Michele Guardia

Area
  - Total: 27.51 km^{2} (10.62 sq mi)
- Elevation: 275 m (902 ft)

Population (30 November 2018)
  - Total: 1,289
  - Density: 46.86/km^{2} (121.4/sq mi)
- Demonym: Sanginetesi
- Time zone: UTC+1 (CET)
  - Summer (DST): UTC+2 (CEST)
- Postal code: 87020
- Dialing code: 0982
- Patron saint: S.Maria della Neve
- Saint day: 5 August
- Website: Official website

Sangineto is a town and comune in the province of Cosenza in the Calabria region of southern Italy.
