= Mandatoriccio =

Mandatoriccio Greek: Mandràtoras
- Comune
- Comune di Mandatoriccio
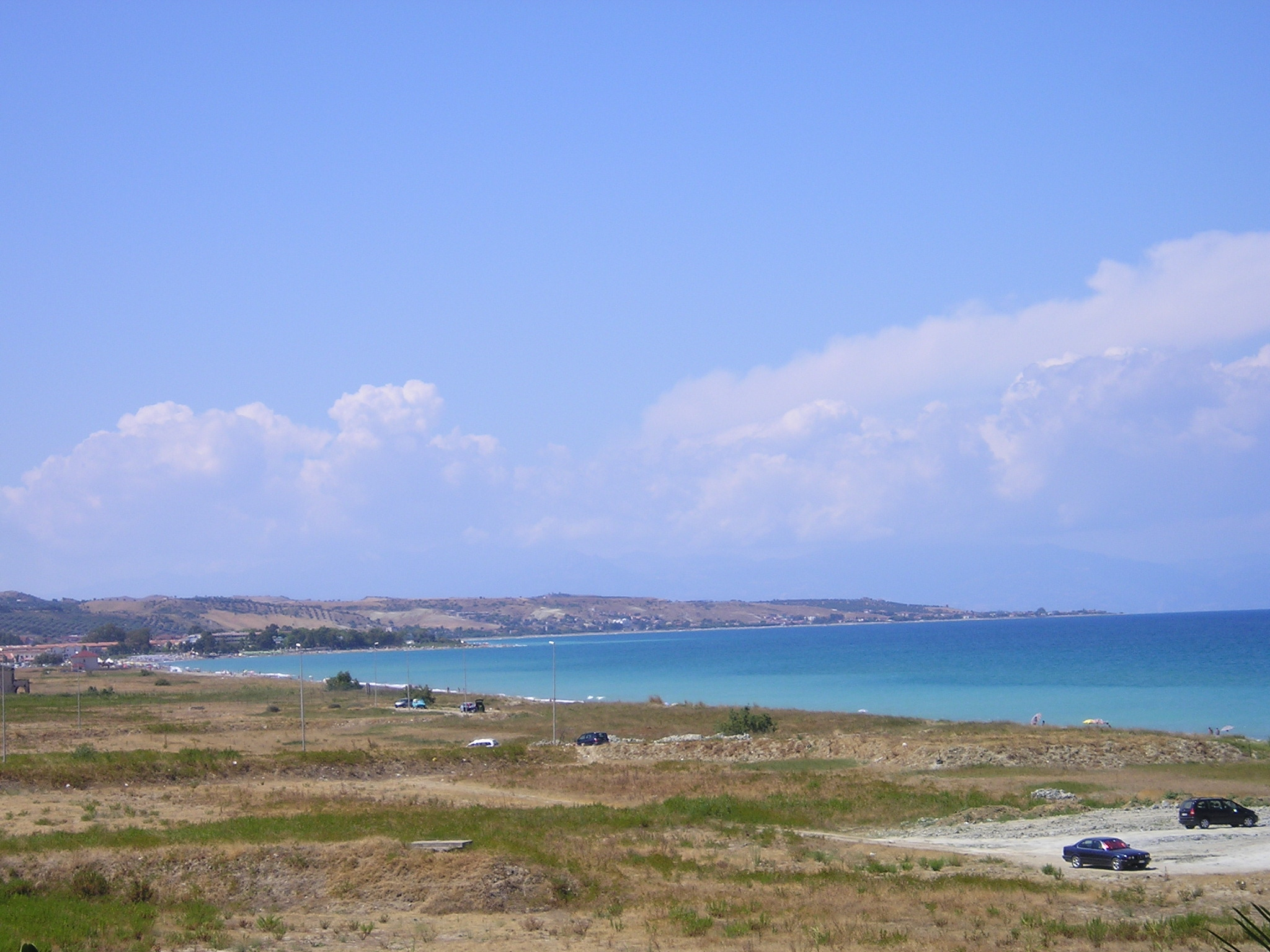
- Seaside in the municipality of Mandatoriccio.

- Location within Italy Location within Calabria
- Coordinates: 39°28′N 16°50′E
- Country: Italy
- Region: Calabria
- Province: Cosenza (CS)

Government
  - Mayor: Vincenzo Leonardo Grispino

Area
  - Total: 37.32 km^{2} (14.41 sq mi)
- Elevation: 561 m (1,841 ft)

Population (2018-01-01)
  - Total: 3,047
  - Density: 81.65/km^{2} (211.5/sq mi)
- Demonym: Mandatoriccesi
- Time zone: UTC+1 (CET)
  - Summer (DST): UTC+2 (CEST)
- Postal code: 87060
- Dialing code: 0983
- Website: Official website

Mandatoriccio is a town and comune in the province of Cosenza in the Calabria region of southern Italy.
