= Province of Cosenza =

Province of Italy

Coordinates: 39°18′N 16°15′E

Province of Cosenza Provincia di Cosenza (Italian)
- Province
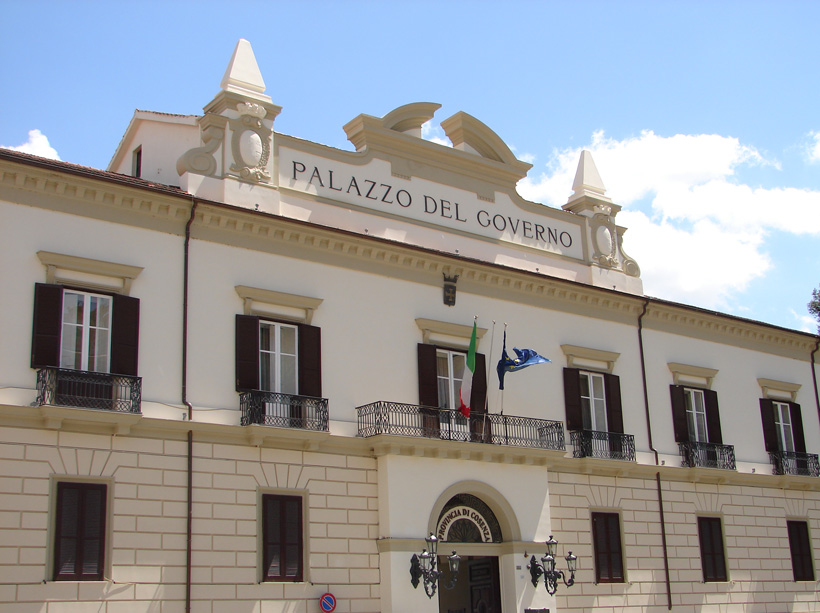
- Palazzo del Governo, the provincial seat

- Flag Coat of arms

- Location of the province of Cosenza in Italy
- Country: Italy
- Region: Calabria
- Capital(s): Cosenza
- Municipalities: 150

Government
  - President: Biagio Faragalli

Area
  - Total: 6,709.75 km^{2} (2,590.65 sq mi)

Population (2026)
  - Total: 667,134
  - Density: 99.4275/km^{2} (257.516/sq mi)

GDP
  - Total: €10.772 billion (2015)
  - Per capita: €15,045 (2015)
- Time zone: UTC+1 (CET)
  - Summer (DST): UTC+2 (CEST)
- Postal code: 87100
- Telephone prefix: 0968, 0981, 0982, 0983, 0984, 0985
- Vehicle registration: CS
- ISTAT code: 078

The province of Cosenza (Italian: provincia di Cosenza) is a province in the region of Calabria in southern Italy. Its capital is the city of Cosenza. It has a population of 667,134 in an area of 6,709.75 square kilometres (2,590.65 sq mi) across its 150 municipalities.

The province of Cosenza contains a community of Occitan language (also known as Langue d'oc) speakers in Guardia Piemontese: it was formed by Vaudoi or Waldensian movement members, who moved to Cosenza to avoid religious persecution, in the 13th and 14th centuries. Many of the Arbëreshë Albanians of Italy live in the province, since arriving in the 16th century to flee the religious persecution undertaken by the Ottoman Empire.

== History ==
The first traces of human settlement in the area date from the early Palaeolithic period. These sites include the Romito Cave at Papasidero, including wall paintings of bovidae.

Cosenza began as a settlement of the Italic Bruttii tribe, and became their capital before the Romans invaded the area. The town was conquered by the Romans in 204 BC and was named Cosentia. Starting from the 8th century BC, the current provincial area became part of the so-called Greater Greece, or Magna Graecia (Latin). Greek cities, including Sibari and Pandosia, were mostly located on the coastal area and at the foot of the Pollino massif.

King of the Visigoths Alaric I conquered the region during the later stages of the Western Roman Empire and according to legend, Alaric I is buried in Cosenza along with a large treasure hoard. Later Cosenza fell under the rule of the Byzantine Empire for a brief period of time, before being conquered by the Lombards, as part of the Duchy of Benevento. Roger II of Sicily made it the capital of Terra Giordana in the 12th century.

In Modern times, as part of the Kingdom of Naples and later of the Kingdom of Two Sicilies, the province remained mostly a rural area devoted to agriculture and animal husbandry. Feudalism was abolished only in the 19th century. The area was also seat to several forms of brigandage during the centuries.

== Municipalities ==
The province has 150 municipalities:

- Acquaformosa
- Acquappesa
- Acri
- Aiello Calabro
- Aieta
- Albidona
- Alessandria del Carretto
- Altilia
- Altomonte
- Amantea
- Amendolara
- Aprigliano
- Belmonte Calabro
- Belsito
- Belvedere Marittimo
- Bianchi
- Bisignano
- Bocchigliero
- Bonifati
- Buonvicino
- Calopezzati
- Caloveto
- Campana
- Canna
- Cariati
- Carolei
- Carpanzano
- Casali del Manco
- Cassano all'Ionio
- Castiglione Cosentino
- Castrolibero
- Castroregio
- Castrovillari
- Celico
- Cellara
- Cerchiara di Calabria
- Cerisano
- Cervicati
- Cerzeto
- Cetraro
- Civita
- Cleto
- Colosimi
- Corigliano-Rossano
- Cosenza
- Cropalati
- Crosia
- Diamante
- Dipignano
- Domanico
- Fagnano Castello
- Falconara Albanese
- Figline Vegliaturo
- Firmo
- Fiumefreddo Bruzio
- Francavilla Marittima
- Frascineto
- Fuscaldo
- Grimaldi
- Grisolia
- Guardia Piemontese
- Lago
- Laino Borgo
- Laino Castello
- Lappano
- Lattarico
- Longobardi
- Longobucco
- Lungro
- Luzzi
- Maierà
- Malito
- Malvito
- Mandatoriccio
- Mangone
- Marano Marchesato
- Marano Principato
- Marzi
- Mendicino
- Mongrassano
- Montalto Uffugo
- Montegiordano
- Morano Calabro
- Mormanno
- Mottafollone
- Nocara
- Oriolo
- Orsomarso
- Paludi
- Panettieri
- Paola
- Papasidero
- Parenti
- Paterno Calabro
- Pedivigliano
- Piane Crati
- Pietrafitta
- Pietrapaola
- Plataci
- Praia a Mare
- Rende
- Rocca Imperiale
- Roggiano Gravina
- Rogliano
- Rose
- Roseto Capo Spulico
- Rota Greca
- Rovito
- San Basile
- San Benedetto Ullano
- San Cosmo Albanese
- San Demetrio Corone
- San Donato di Ninea
- San Fili
- San Giorgio Albanese
- San Giovanni in Fiore
- San Lorenzo Bellizzi
- San Lorenzo del Vallo
- San Lucido
- San Marco Argentano
- San Martino di Finita
- San Nicola Arcella
- San Pietro in Amantea
- San Pietro in Guarano
- San Sosti
- San Vincenzo La Costa
- Sangineto
- Sant'Agata di Esaro
- Santa Caterina Albanese
- Santa Domenica Talao
- Santa Maria del Cedro
- Santa Sofia d'Epiro
- Santo Stefano di Rogliano
- Saracena
- Scala Coeli
- Scalea
- Scigliano
- Serra d'Aiello
- Spezzano Albanese
- Spezzano della Sila
- Tarsia
- Terranova da Sibari
- Terravecchia
- Torano Castello
- Tortora
- Trebisacce
- Vaccarizzo Albanese
- Verbicaro
- Villapiana
- Zumpano

== Demographics ==
As of 2026, the population is 667,134, of which 49.2% are male, and 50.8% are female. Minors make up 14.5% of the population, and seniors make up 25.4%.

Historical population

Year	Pop.	±%
1861	443,009	—
1871	454,677	+2.6%
1881	474,207	+4.3%
1901	503,329	+6.1%
1911	522,620	+3.8%
1921	545,616	+4.4%
1931	568,073	+4.1%
1936	587,025	+3.3%

Year	Pop.	±%
1951	686,351	+16.9%
1961	694,398	+1.2%
1971	691,659	−0.4%
1981	743,255	+7.5%
1991	750,896	+1.0%
2001	733,797	−2.3%
2011	714,030	−2.7%
2021	674,543	−5.5%

Source: ISTAT

=== Immigration ===
As of 2025, immigrants make up 9.2% of the population. The 5 largest foreign countries of birth are Romania, Germany, Argentina, Morocco, and Brazil.

== See also ==
- Amantea Castle
- Lake Passante
