= Marano Principato =

- Comune
- Comune di Marano Principato
- Location within Italy Location within Calabria
- Coordinates: 39°18′N 16°11′E
- Country: Italy
- Region: Calabria
- Province: Cosenza (CS)
- Frazioni: Bisciglietto, Canali, Pantusa, Savagli

Government
  - Mayor: Luigi Pulice

Area
  - Total: 6 km^{2} (2.3 sq mi)
- Elevation: 480 m (1,570 ft)

Population (2007)
  - Total: 2,778
  - Density: 460/km^{2} (1,200/sq mi)
- Demonym: Principatesi
- Time zone: UTC+1 (CET)
  - Summer (DST): UTC+2 (CEST)
- Postal code: 87040
- Dialing code: 0984
- Patron saint: Annunciation of Mary
- Saint day: 8 September
- Website: Official website

Marano Principato (Calabrian: Marànu or 'U Principàtu) is a town and comune in the province of Cosenza in the Calabria region of southern Italy.
