= Acri =

Acri Èacri (Neapolitan)
- Comune
- Comune di Acri
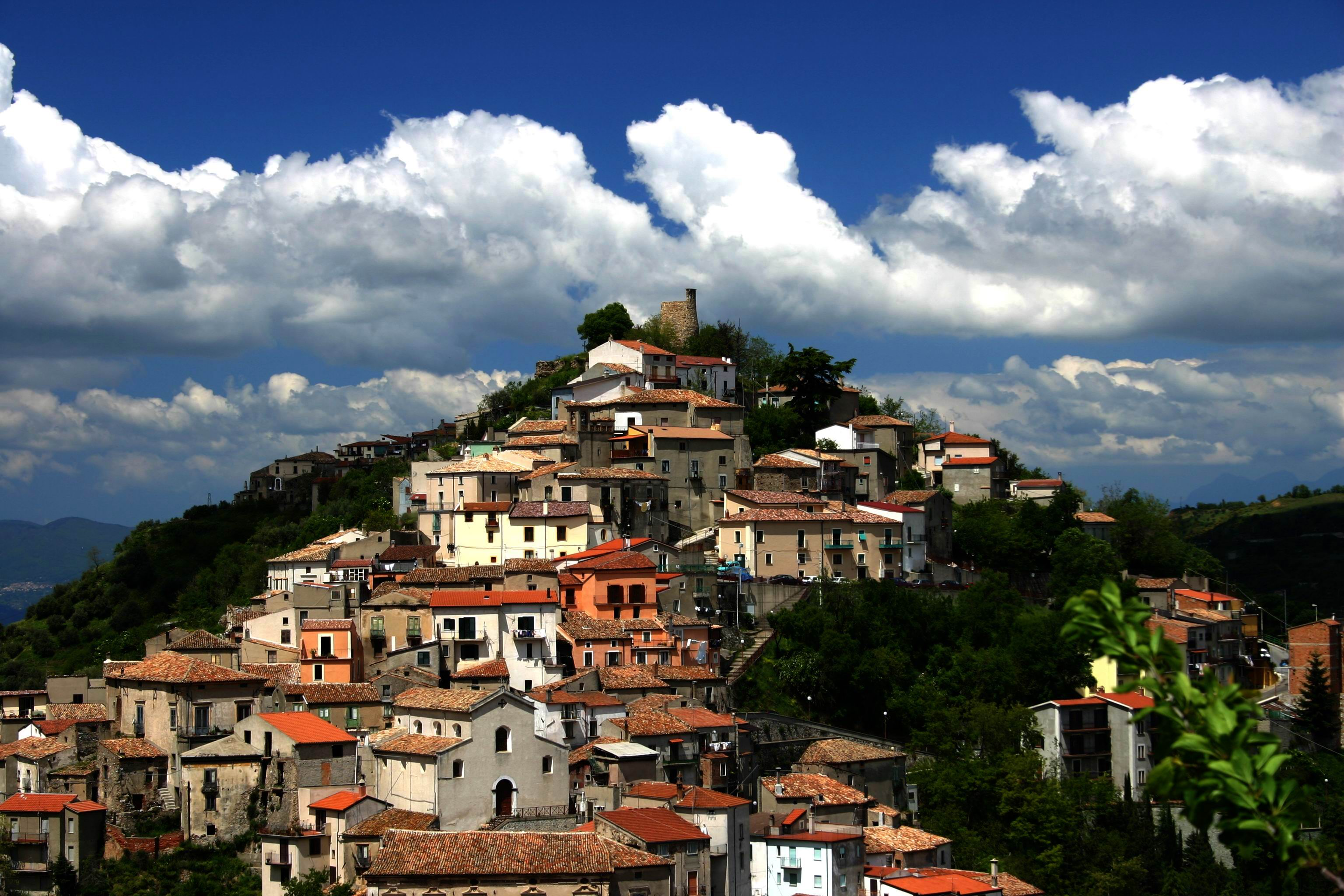

- Coat of arms

- Location of Acri in Italy Acri (Calabria)
- Coordinates: 39°30′N 16°23′E
- Country: Italy
- Region: Calabria
- Province: Cosenza (CS)

Government
  - Mayor: Pino Capalbo

Area
  - Total: 200.63 km^{2} (77.46 sq mi)
- Elevation: 720 m (2,360 ft)

Population (10 August 2020)
  - Total: 19,949
  - Density: 99.432/km^{2} (257.53/sq mi)
- Demonyms: Acresi, Acritani
- Time zone: UTC+1 (CET)
  - Summer (DST): UTC+2 (CEST)
- Postal code: 87041
- Dialing code: 0984
- Patron saint: Saint Angelo d'Acri
- Saint day: 30 October
- Website: Official website

Acri (Calabrian: Èacri; from Greek ἄκρα, ákra, 'peak') is a city with 19,949 inhabitants, located in the northern part of the Calabria region in southern Italy. Acri was granted city status on 17 September 2001.

== Geography ==
=== Territory ===
Acri’s urban center is located at 720 m (2,360 ft) near the Sila mountains. Its territory extends over 200.63 km^{2} (77.46 sq mi). The city dominates the Mucone Valley and the Crati Valley.

Its primary rivers are the Mucone, Calamo, and Duglia.

Between 2006 and 2015, Acri experienced a higher number of forest fires caused by unknown individuals compared to other municipalities.

=== Climate ===
The climate is Mediterranean, characterized by harsh winters and dry, hot summers. However, this climate is not uniform throughout the town, and the suburbs may differ from the city center.

== Politics ==
- Mayor: 2000 – 2005: Nicola Tenuta
- Mayor: 2005 – 2010: Elio Coschignano
- Mayor: 2010 – 2012: Gino Trematerra
- Mayor: 2012 – 2013: Luigi Maiorano
- Mayor: 2013 – 2017: Nicola Tenuta
- Prefectural Commissioner: 2017 – 2017: Maria Vercillo
- Mayor: 2017 – : Pino Capalbo

== Monuments and places of interest ==
Acri's coat of arms features three mountains topped by three stars, along with the inscription: "Acrae, Tri Vertex, Montis Fertilis, U.A. (Universitas Acrensis)." The oldest known version of Acri’s heraldic coat of arms, dating back to 1524, was carved in stone alongside the coats of arms of the feudal families of the time, including the Princes San Severino da Bisignano. This coat of arms can be found on the door of the Church and Convent of San Domenico.

=== Civil architectures ===
==== Castle of Acri ====
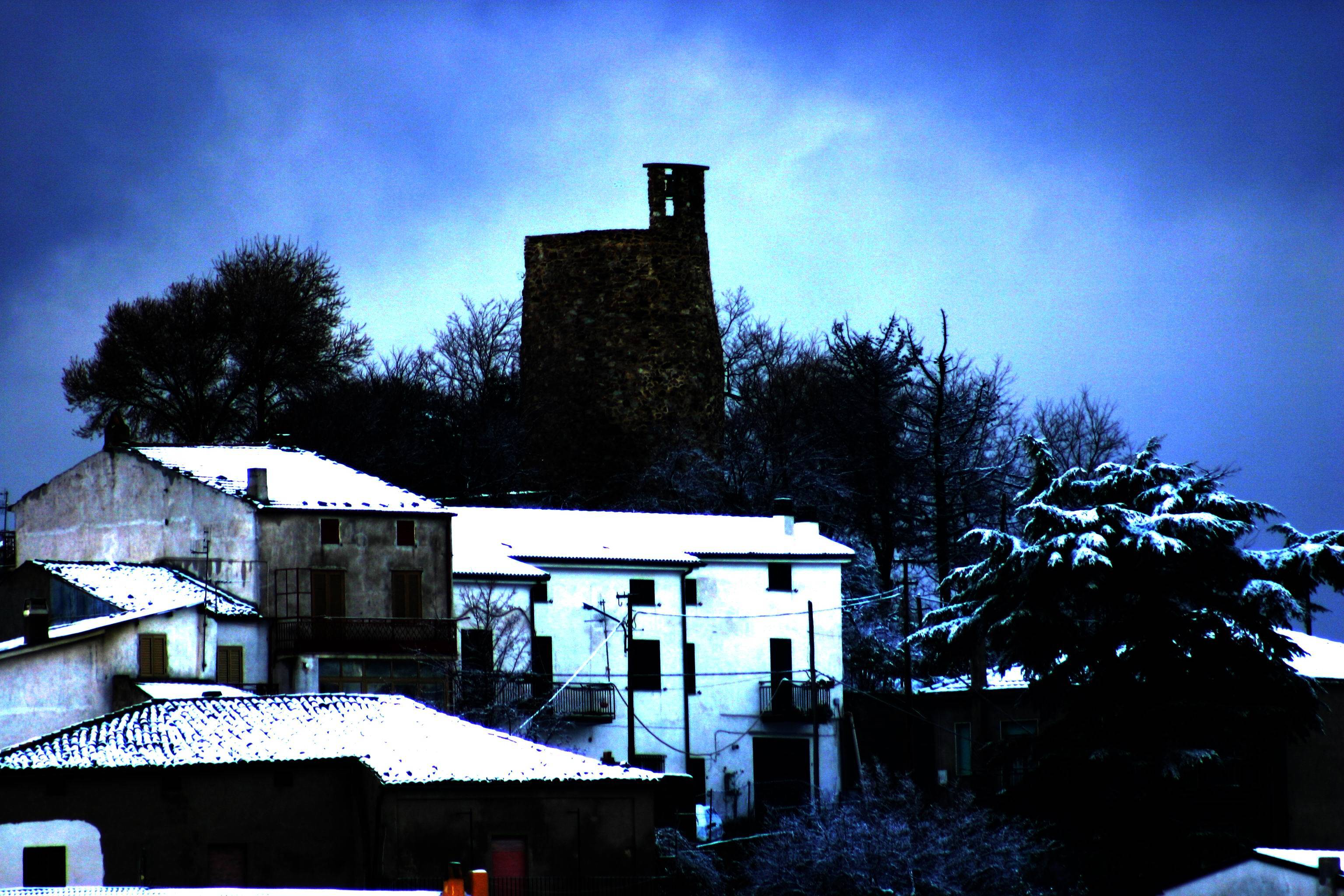
Castle's night view

The Castle of Acri, also known as Rocca dei Bruzii, was a defensive structure that historians believe was erected during the Bruttian era. Today, only a single tower remains, which has become a symbol of the city.

It is located on the outskirts of the territory controlled by the powerful Sybaris during the time of Magna Graecia. The hypothesis of Bruzian construction is now strongly supported by various archaeological finds, dating from the Eneolithic period to the Late Bronze Age, discovered around the old city of Acri.

Later, it became a Roman fortress, as evidenced by a Latin marble plaque found in 1890 inscribed with "XII LEGIO," and small portions of Greek mosaics discovered near the castle.

The castle originally had a trapezoidal shape, with three towers positioned at the highest point and a fourth located at the lowest part of the defensive walls to control the drawbridge or machicolation gate. The defensive walls enclosed the entire citadel in the Pàdia district.

The castle's surrounding walls are approximately 2 meters thick at the highest part of the perimeter, while the walls at the lower level are described as being about 4 meters thick.

Visible until the early 20th century, the cistern used for water supply during a siege was located north of the existing tower. It stood about two floors high, with each floor measuring 3 meters in height and 20 meters in width.

In 1999, several coins of Greek origin were discovered within the castle walls. These included coins from Sybaris, Thurii, and one from Crotone, all of which are now in the possession of the Archaeological Superintendence of Sibaritide.

==== Palaces ====
===== Palazzo Sanseverino-Falcone =====
Palazzo Sanseverino-Falcone belonged to the powerful Calabrian Sanseverino family. It was constructed beginning in the 17th century by Giuseppe Leopoldo Sanseverino X, Prince of Bisignano. The building’s construction was overseen by Stefano Vangeri from Rogliano, who worked on the project until 1720, likely completing the finishing touches that year. The structure has four floors. The ground and first floors functioned as a guardhouse for the prince. The east wing of the ground floor includes a large hall, known as the "Sala delle Colonne," which features eight stone columns with late sixteenth-century style capitals. These columns are believed to have been reused from an earlier building, possibly a church.

The second floor, known as the "noble floor," where the family resided, contains several halls adorned with frescoes. Though some of the frescoes have deteriorated, parts remain visible. The third floor was used for the servants and housed the kitchen.

===== Palazzo Padula =====
Owned by the poet Vincenzo Padula, the palace was built in an originally isolated area. On the portal, Padula had two feathers and an inkwell sculpted—symbols from his family's coat of arms. The palace was equipped with loopholes for firearms, which were used to defend against frequent attacks brigands during that period. Today, the palace houses the Municipal Library and the Museum of Rural Civilization.

===== Palazzo Julia =====
Dating back to the 15th century, this property has always belonged to the Julia family, passing down from father to son. It was constructed in two distinct phases: the first phase dates back to the 16th century, and the second phase was completed at the end of the 18th century. The building spans three floors and houses a rich library with over five thousand volumes, including texts from the 16th and 17th centuries, as well as some rare ancient editions.

===== Palazzo De Simone-Julia =====
The building is named after its owners, the De Simone family, and their heirs, the Julia family. Constructed in the early 17th century, it is located in the historic center.

===== Palazzo Spezzano =====
An ancient noble residence dating back to the 18th century, the palace belonged to the Spezzano noble family.

===== Palazzo Astorino Giannone =====
Originally inhabited by the Astorino family in the 1700s, the palace later passed to the Fusari family. The Giannone family, originally from Bitonto in the province of Bari, extensively transformed the building into a country mansion. Inside, the palace still contains furniture and paintings from the 18th and 19th centuries, as well as a library with thousands of ancient volumes from these periods.

===== Palazzo Civitate =====
This ancient palace belonged to the noble Civitate family, originally from San Marco Argentano, who settled in Acri in the 1400s. The building spans three floors, with cellars located on the south side. Much of its original splendor has been lost due to transformations by subsequent owners. The entrance door, adorned with the Civitate family coat of arms, remains unchanged from antiquity, as do three iron cages, known locally as caggiarole. These cages, placed on the wall facing Azzinnari Square by the Napoleonic army, were used to display the heads of three notorious bandit leaders. These individuals had been accused of kidnapping and killing three sons of the Civitate family between 1720 and 1730.

==== Religious architecture ====
- Church of the Madonna del Rinfresco, built by parish priest Giacomo De Piris in 1521.
- Church and Convent of San Francesco di Paola. Dating from the 16th to 17th centuries.
- Basilica of Sant'Angelo.
- Church of Santa Chiara, built in 1420.
- Church of the Annunziata, was first mentioned historically in 1269. In the ancient church, now transformed into a sacristy, a Byzantine-Gothic fresco was recently discovered. The fresco, created by an unknown artist, depicts the deposition of Jesus Christ on Golgotha. At the bottom of the fresco are words written in ancient Gothic script.
- Church and Convent of the Capuchin Fathers, built in 1590, the church and convent were established by the Capuchin Fathers.
- Church of San Nicola Ante Castillum (San Nicola of Mjra)
  - Rebuilt in the early 15th century, the church likely originated in the 10th or 11th century. During consolidation efforts, remnants of an earlier structure dating back to around the 8th century were discovered. Records from Bishop Ruffino's audience mention the church reopening for worship after the devastating earthquake of 1080–1081, and the consecration of five Greek rite priests.
- Church of Santa Maria Maggiore (1269)
  - During restoration works in 2004 and subsequently in 2007, numerous discoveries were made that conclusively date the church to the early Christian period.
- Church of Santa Caterina
  - Believed to have been built around 1500, it was partly destroyed by the earthquake of 1638.
- Church of San Nicola da Belvedere
  - This ancient Greek rite church is located in the former Casalicchio district. According to Bishop Ruffino da Bisignano's records, the church reopened for worship after the devastating earthquake of 1080. It was first mentioned in 1070 when Queen Giovanna d'Angiò gifted it to Count Simone Cofone of Acri and Padia.

== Economy ==
Occupation
Occupation rate	Youth occupation rate (15–29 years)
38.4	24.2

Disoccupation
Disoccupation rate	Youth disoccupation rate (15–29 years)
18.5	47.5

Occupation rate
Sector	Rate
Services	37.7%
Industry	24%
Agriculture	24.1%
Commerce	14.2%

Occupation rate
Profession	Rate
High – medium specialization	24%
Artisans, farmers, workmen	20.7%
Low level of competence	33.4%

The Acri Pig Reproduction Experimental Center (ARSA) focuses on breeding black pigs and supports activities ranging from production to processing, including experimental work on Calabrian delicacies. Its related activities include the recovery, enhancement, breeding, and promotion of local pig farming, with a particular emphasis on the Calabrian black pig. Pig production plays a crucial role in sustaining the locally renowned charcuterie industry.

The area is home to artisanal businesses and small industrial companies.

It also produces and exports wine, oil, and livestock.

=== Infrastructure and transport ===
The main connection road is SP660, linking Acri with the A2 motorway (Reggio–Salerno) and the Sila National Park. Another important road is SP177, which connects Acri with SS106 (Reggio–Taranto) and the cities of Corigliano-Rossano. There is a high risk of road accidents along SP660.

== Sports ==
=== Sports facilities ===
The "Pasquale Castrovillari" Municipal Stadium has a capacity of 5,000 seats.

=== Football ===
The main football team in the city is Calcio Acri, which competes in the Calabria Promotion championship. Additionally, there is a 5-a-side football team called Calcio a 5 Acri, which participates in the provincial championship organized by the CSI.

=== Rugby ===
Also present is the rugby team Rugby Acri, which has achieved significant successes on the regional scene in recent years.

== History ==
The origins of the city of Acri have long been debated among scholars and are generally attributed to the ancient Osci people, who were later supplanted by the Bruzi and Lucani.

=== Prehistoric settlements ===
The archaeological site of Colle Logna in Acri was discovered by Prof. Giuseppe Palermo in 1996. Excavations at the site began in 1998 under the Archaeological Superintendence of Calabria, Sibari Excavation Office, in collaboration with the European Protohistory Department of Università "La Sapienza" di Roma. A human settlement was uncovered on the western slopes of Colle Logna. The oldest artifacts found date back to the beginning of the Middle Neolithic (6350 +/-50 BC), while the more recent artifacts are identified as belonging to the ancient Bronze Age (2800-2100 BC).

In 2002, a second site was identified in the locality of Policaretto, within the municipality of Acri. The two settlements are located opposite each other. Identical materials have been found at both sites, but in the second site, they are present in greater quantities and are possibly older, according to experts. The extent of the second settlement was likely considerable, encompassing several hill peaks.

In July 2002, a third excavation campaign began in the Policaretto locality.

Notable findings from the site include ovens used for processing ceramics, Bruzian pottery, and the remains of a Roman villa dating to the 2nd-1st century BC. Other artifacts discovered in the area are obsidian and flint arrowheads, fragments of local pottery (Osca or Bruzian), remains of archaic Greek pottery, small bronze objects, and various Greek coins. These items are now housed at the National Archaeological Museum of Sibaritide.

In summary, a human settlement existed in the territory of Acri from the Eneolithic period through the Late Bronze Age.

=== Pandosia ===
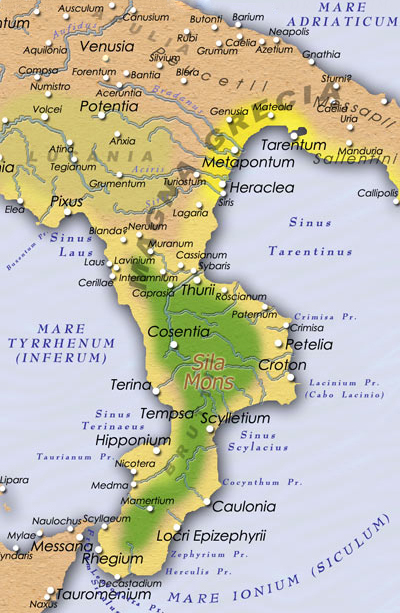
Magna Grecia 280aC

"Pandosia Bruzia" is an ancient city referenced by historians, likely located in the territory of Acri.

Pandosia is described by the historian Strabo (VI 1, -5) as the ancient capital of the Enotri people, highlighting its significance as a center between the Bronze Age and the Iron Age. In later times, it is noted for being the site near the river Acheron, where King Alexander I of Epirus was murdered.

In the historic center and surrounding areas of Acri, significant archaeological findings analyzed using carbon-14 dating have revealed continuous habitation from the Pre-Eneolithic period through the Iron Age. Further discoveries indicate that occupation extended into the Classical Age.

=== Acri in Roman times ===
Acri resisted Roman dominion but, after the Battle of Cannae, sided with the Carthaginians and subsequently surrendered in 203 BC.

Their desire for freedom was reignited between 73 and 71 BC when, along with neighboring municipalities, they supported Spartacus' revolt. Spartacus was encamped in the territories known as Campo Vile near the municipality of Bisignano during the Third Servile War.

Procopius tells us that Acri's fortress later passed to Emperor Justinian. In 542, there are accounts of the strenuous resistance that the city of Acri put up against the Ostrogoths led by Totila. However, Totila eventually conquered the city through starvation and thirst, sacked it, destroyed much of it, and committed horrendous acts of violence.

=== Acri in medieval and modern times ===
In the first half of 650, and again at the end of 670, residents fleeing a severe malaria epidemic in nearby Thurii moved to Acri. This influx of people led to a noticeable improvement in productive activities, marking a period of general well-being.

=== From the Longobards to the Normans ===
With the arrival of the Lombards in the Crati Valley, Acri quickly became their Gastaldato, holding considerable economic importance. This status continued until at least 896, when it was first occupied by the Byzantines and later by the Saracens.

After its liberation, three additional Saracen raids are documented in 945, 1009, and 1200.

During the initial period of the Normans' arrival, led by Roberto il Guiscardo, Acri and the city of Bisignano, the two strongest cities in the Crati valley, were repeatedly attacked and sacked. At the end of the conflict, Guiscard granted extensive privileges to the nobles to maintain and consolidate his power.

In 1074–1075, he granted Count Simone Cofone (Count of Acri and Pàdia) large portions of the Sila territory. At that time, this land was partly the ancient possession of the Cistercian monks of the monastery known as dei Menna and partly owned by Count Cofone.

Between 1084 and 1086 AD, a conflict of interest erupted into a bloody war. The truce, which allowed the Count of Acri to retain possession of the lands while paying tribute to the monks, proved illusory. Further disputes led to violent attacks on the convent and neighboring areas. The situation escalated to the point where Pope Urban II excommunicated all involved parties, and the Norman authorities sentenced them to five years in prison. Additionally, they were ordered to pay five thousand pounds of gold and silver to the monks' adversaries, who then regained control of the lands.

Meanwhile, during that period, the slow but progressive process of Latinization, promoted by the Normans, continued in an environment strongly tied to Byzantine culture. Between 982 and 987, Saint Nilus of Rossano founded the monastery of Saints Hadrian, Natalia, and Demetrius in the territory of Acri, which became the most significant center of Basilian monks in Calabria. Near the monastery, the districts of Picitti, Schifo, and Poggio arose, which were later absorbed by the Albanian village of San Demetrio Corone.

The Cistercian monastic order played a significant role in the spiritual life of the Acri region. They constructed the monastery known as SS. Trinity de Lignos Crucis between 1153 and 1195. The monastery housed Abbot Gioacchino da Fiore and was likely destroyed during the last Saracen incursion into the territory around 1220–1240. It was crucial for the development of sericulture and various other crafts, such as leather tanning and manufacturing.

=== Earthquake of 1185 ===
The History of Bisignano describes an earthquake that occurred in the ancient diocese of Bisignano, noting that under the rule of Guglielmo II between 1184 and 1186, Calabria experienced devastating earthquakes. Various centers in the Presila region were damaged or completely destroyed, and in 1185, Acri was nearly obliterated by one such earthquake. The devastation was further exacerbated by hunger and cholera following a prolonged drought, worsening the plight of the survivors. It took several months of effort, mainly to clear landslides, before a communication route could be reopened to bring wagons and aid to the most isolated areas. Other documented earthquakes include those of 10 December 908, 10 December 968, 24 May 990, 24 October 1184, 27 March 1186, 27 March 1638, 12 July 1712, 6 September 1738, 14 July 1767, 5 February 1783, 18 June 1787, 10 December 1824, 8 March 1832, 12 October 1835, and 24 April 1836.

=== Cholera and plague epidemics ===
In addition to cholera between 1184 and 1186, Calabria, particularly Cosenza, suffered from various epidemics that significantly reduced the population. Documented outbreaks include the plague as well as subsequent epidemics in 1422, 1528, 1575, 1656, 1638, 1738, and finally the Spanish flu in the early 20th century, which reportedly claimed the lives of about a thousand citizens according to the census.

=== Acri in 1300 ===
In 1300, the number of state-owned cities—those not held as fiefdoms by private families and remaining under the crown's possession—was considerable.

The Sangineto and the Sanseverino families demanded the restitution of territories acquired by the Diocese of Bisignano, which they believed had been usurped by the bishops and abbots.

Among these lands and fiefdoms was Acri, which was under the jurisdiction of the Bishop of Bisignano. The bishop was forbidden from considering these lands as Church fiefs. According to precedents established by Charles I of Anjou, these territories and their respective castles fell under the competence and jurisdiction of the barons. The bishop's stubborn refusal to relinquish the lands and renounce the alleged feudal rights provoked retaliation from the powerful barons.

The riots, reprisals, and violent clashes between the various factions were continuous, with the most significant and dramatic occurring in 1339.

Baron Ruggero II Sangineto, taking advantage of the confusion in Bisignano at the time, executed his plan. From Corigliano, he led a group of armed horsemen to Acri. There, they gathered hungry and needy common people eager for looting and plunder before heading toward Bisignano.

On 28 June 1339, the eve of the feast of St. Peter and St. Paul, they entered the city of Bisignano and killed the bishop's personal guards, family members, and everyone who defended him.

Finally, the dying bishop was mercilessly dragged and tied to the tail of the Sangineto's horse.

With other convicts, he was taken to a place called Scannaturu, likely located behind the current Church of San Domenico.

The unfortunate bishop, now lifeless, was condemned to be beheaded, a sentence that was immediately carried out, along with the fate of all the other condemned individuals.

=== Frederick II, the Angevins and the Aragonese ===
During the reign of Frederick II, the city enjoyed a period of relative tranquility and considerable economic prosperity. It became an important center in the silk trade until the arrival of the Angevins and later the Aragonese, who weakened the city's economy with heavy taxes.

In 1462, Duke Luca Sanseverino of San Marco Argentano purchased the cities of Acri and Bisignano from the tax authorities, with the concession of King Ferrante I d'Aragona, for the sum of 20,000 gold and silver ducats.

In the same year, the city of Acri, which remained loyal to the Angevins, endured a severe siege by Aragonese troops. Despite their efforts to conquer the city, they succeeded through the collaboration of a traitor named Milan. Milan signaled the enemy troops from the guards at the outposts and, at the appointed time in the middle of the night, opened the city gates.

The heroic commander of the city guards, Nicolò Clancioffo, was sawn alive by the loins in the castle square. His body was then divided into four pieces and displayed on the four towers of the castle.

According to a document by the notary Marsilio Aliprandi dated 1479–80, many properties in the Parrieti, Padia, Picitti, and Castello districts were sold as vegetable gardens because the houses had been burned down and were in ruins. There were not enough men available to rebuild these neighborhoods.

We do not have complete records from 1462, but it is assumed that during that war, the city lost about two thousand inhabitants, including some of the armies that followed Viceroy Grimaldi. He managed to escape from the dungeons of the Castle di Acri with a few of his men and took refuge in nearby Longobucco.

=== Acri from 1492 to 1499 ===
From 1492, Acri came under the Aragonese governorate. When Charles VIII descended upon Italy, the Prince of Bisignano went to meet the king, while the Count of Acri and the Marquis of Squillace fled to Sicily. Their possessions were confiscated by King Charles and given to D'Aubugny, a supporter of the Angevins and allies of Charles VIII. Learning of this, the Count and the Marquis supported the Aragonese cause once again. Consequently, the city of Acri aligned with Frederick of Aragon, which led to another siege of Acri in 1496-1497, employing modern siege weapons. The city was sacked by the Angevins, the castle was nearly destroyed, and several important noble palaces were razed. The leaders of the people, Placido and Sebastiano of the powerful Salvidio family, were killed, their bodies dismembered and thrown into manure.

=== Expulsion of the Jews ===
In 1511, by decree of King Ferdinand I, the Jews, who were significant figures in the city's economy and residents of the ancient Judeica ghetto, were expelled. This event greatly harmed the local economy. The area where the ghetto once stood is still known today as Judeica, located near the Calamo stream outside the fortified walls. Documentation indicates that the ghetto in Acri existed before the year 1000.

=== Brigandage in Acri ===
==== Raid of the Jaccapitta Gang ====
In 1806, Acri suffered an incursion by a horde of brigands who, intending to proceed to nearby Bisignano, halted in the city. This formidable group of 3,000 men, led by Jacapitta, came primarily from the woods around Cosenza and its surrounding hamlets with the intention of ransacking Bisignano.

After pillaging Acri and committing atrocious acts of cruelty, they continued towards Bisignano. There, they encountered the forces of Bagnanich and Benincasa, supported by the entire population. As a result, they retreated towards the mountains of Acri.

On 30 August, General Verdier departed with a detachment of 1,500 men, joined by the Bisignano garrison. Jacapitta, the ferocious and bloodthirsty brigand who had brutally attacked the victims in Acri, was found hiding in the surrounding countryside. He entered the town in chains, even staining himself with heinous acts of cannibalism.

Bound and dragged into the town square, Jacapitta was placed amidst four fires. Cursing and screaming, he jumped from one stake to another in an attempt to escape the torture while bystanders struck his legs with sticks. Exhausted, he eventually collapsed with a savage cry into the flames that reduced him to ashes.

==== Band of King Coremme ====
In August of the same year, the brigand chief Antonio Santoro, known as Re Coremme, descended from the mountains of Acri and attempted to take Bisignano. Despite being an illiterate peasant, he was shrewd and extraordinarily brave. After the Bourbon resistance in Calabria ceased, he organized a formidable band with which he intended to continue the war against the French in his own way. He assaulted Acri during the night and, having coerced the administrators, used it as a new base to spread death and terror among his enemies—the anti-Bourbon revolutionaries who supported the French.

In his endeavor, Santoro was caught off guard by General Verdier's troops, who managed to disperse his band. Fleeing hastily and separated from his main force, Santoro encountered the civic militia of Santa Sofia d'Epiro, commanded by Giorgio Ferriolo, on 13 August 1806. Santoro and his small staff, including his brother and a few trusted men, were captured and locked in an isolated cell. However, Santoro managed to escape that night and returned to Acri.

=== Acri from the Unification of Italy to 1950 ===
The history of Acri under Vincenzo Sprovieri began with high hopes among the people. However, these hopes were soon dashed as Sprovieri abandoned the promises made in 1848 and established a despotic rule. While he successfully eliminated brigandage, he also used the extensive municipal property to buy the favor of councilors and voters, neglecting the so-called "Acritian plebs."

Subsequent administrations followed Sprovieri's lead, continuing to exploit state property despite complaints lodged by local newspapers at the time, with authorities turning a blind eye.

At the beginning of the 20th century, the situation in the town had changed little compared to the Risorgimento period. During this time, the first and only electricity company was established in Acri, providing electricity to both public and private entities. However, these developments brought limited benefits to the majority of the population and primarily served the interests of its operators. Additionally, social assistance initiatives emerged, including the establishment of a hospital, a hospice for the poor, and a boarding school, largely due to the efforts of Francesco Maria Greco, who is also credited with reforming the clergy of Acri.

During World War I, 1,518 residents of Acri enlisted for the front. The postwar period in Acri was marked by an outbreak of cholera and widespread social demonstrations prompted by high living costs and unemployment.

In 1927, with the unfortunate advent of fascism, the podestarile administration of Paride Manes began, followed by those of Filippo Sprovieri, Angelo Giannone, and Pasquale Talarico, and lasted until 1943.

Regarding the work of the Podestà administrations, Podestà Talarico wrote to the Prefect of Cosenza that "in Acri there was, in the 40s, a sad administrative situation, a no less sad moral situation of the population who still lived under a regime feudal without the fascist civilization having even appeared to lighten the minds and soften the hearts of most of the citizens".

At the outbreak of World War II, 1,352 citizens from Acri joined the front.

With the fall of fascism, the municipal administration was overseen by prefectural commissioners who were unable to address the food shortages and lack of employment.

A turning point occurred with the election of Saverio Spezzano as mayor in 1946. He fulfilled his campaign promises by providing the people of Acri with bread, work, and "balls and mesh," which referred to rigor and legality.

1948 was a difficult year for Acri due to intense political conflict over land occupation, particularly regarding the Pietramorella wood.

== Demographics ==
Historical population

Year	Pop.	±%
1861	12,032	—
1871	10,965	−8.9%
1881	11,442	+4.4%
1901	13,132	+14.8%
1911	13,306	+1.3%
1921	14,252	+7.1%
1931	15,883	+11.4%
1936	16,213	+2.1%

Year	Pop.	±%
1951	20,239	+24.8%
1961	21,583	+6.6%
1971	20,615	−4.5%
1981	21,189	+2.8%
1991	22,223	+4.9%
2001	21,891	−1.5%
2011	21,458	−2.0%
2021	19,127	−10.9%

Source: ISTAT

The highest population density is found in the main town, Acri. However, the old-age index reveals a concentration of elderly residents in rural areas, along with a higher incidence of elderly couples. Highly and medium-specialized professions and higher education levels are more prevalent in the main urban center.

=== Foreign population ===
According to ISTAT data as of 31 December 2018, the foreign resident population numbered 721 people. The top ten nationalities are:

1. Romania 312
2. Albania 107
3. Bulgaria 104
4. China 27
5. Poland 24
6. Ukraine 18
7. Mali 13
8. Germany 11
9. United States 8
10. India 8
11. Somalia 8

Others: Afghanistan, Iraq 7, Tunisia 5, Russian Federation, Latvia, Bangladesh 4, Egypt, Nigeria, Senegal, Burkina Faso 3, Austria, France, Liberia, Spain, Hungary, Ghana, Morocco, Nigeria, Venezuela, Gambia 2, Denmark, Netherlands, Switzerland, Pakistan, Guinea, Algeria, Angola, Sudan, Cuba, Dominican Republic, Honduras, Mexico, Brazil, Colombia, Philippines, Argentina, Moldova, Ivory Coast.

== Culture ==
Most people in Acri are Christian and observe both Christian customs and traditional Italian practices. Additionally, they celebrate events like White Night, Pink Night, and Red Night, which focus on shopping and economic activities, each with its own customs. For example, during White Night, shops and restaurants remain open throughout the night, often featuring performances and entertainment.

=== Languages and dialects ===
The dialect of Acri is a Romance language that derives from spoken Latin and retains traces of languages from subsequent dominations. Its main characteristics compared to standard Italian are:

- Addition of "EA" at the endings of words and verbs (e.g., accattatu in Calabrian becomes accatteatu in Acri).
- Transformation of the vowels "O" and "E" in Italian into "U" and "I," respectively (e.g., peres becomes pirus (pears), vino becomes vinu (wine); pane becomes pani (bread)).
- Transformation of the letter "B" into "V" (e.g., basciu becomes vasciu (bass)); however, when "B" is preceded by "M," it retains its sound (e.g., gamba becomes gamma (leg)).
- A singular characteristic of the Acri dialect is the change of the consonant "L" followed by a vowel into "D"; for example, in Calabrian, mela becomes mida, and in the Acri dialect, mida; luci (light) becomes duci.

In general, Acri follows the Calabrian dialect common in Calabria and Southern Italy.

=== Museums and libraries ===
- Municipal Library at the Padula Palace.
- MACA Acri Contemporary Art Museum in the Palazzo Sanseverino-Falcone.
- Museum of the Beato Angelo in the Capuchin Fathers' convent.
- Museum of Rural Civilization at the Padula Palace.

=== Media ===
==== Television ====
EATV, founded on 1 December 2016, is available on Channel 623 of digital terrestrial television.

==== Radio ====
Radio Acheruntia was founded in 1977.

== Demographic evolution ==
Demographic history View source data.
Demography by age View source data.
Demographic trend View source data.

== Notable people ==
- Luca Antonio Falcone, better known as Saint Angelo of Acri, who is a popular figure in the town
- Charles Atlas, bodybuilder and trainer
- Francesco Maria Greco, priest
- Silvio Vigliaturo, glass artist and painter
- Marcello Guido, deconstructivist architect
- Angelo Arciglione, pianist
