= Elicitation =

Elicitation may refer to:

- Collecting intelligence information from people as part of human intelligence (intelligence gathering)
- Elicitation technique or elicitation procedure, any of various data collection techniques in social sciences or other fields to gather knowledge or information from people
- Expert elicitation, the synthesis of opinions of experts on a subject where there is uncertainty due to insufficient data
- Multiple EM for Motif Elicitation, a tool for discovering motifs in a group of related DNA or protein sequences
- Preference elicitation, the problem of developing a decision support system capable of generating recommendations to a user, thus assisting him in decision making
- Requirements elicitation, the practice of obtaining the requirements of a system from users, customers and other stakeholders
- Zaltman metaphor elicitation technique, a patented market research tool

== See also ==
- Elicitor
