= Silvio Vigliaturo =

Italian painter

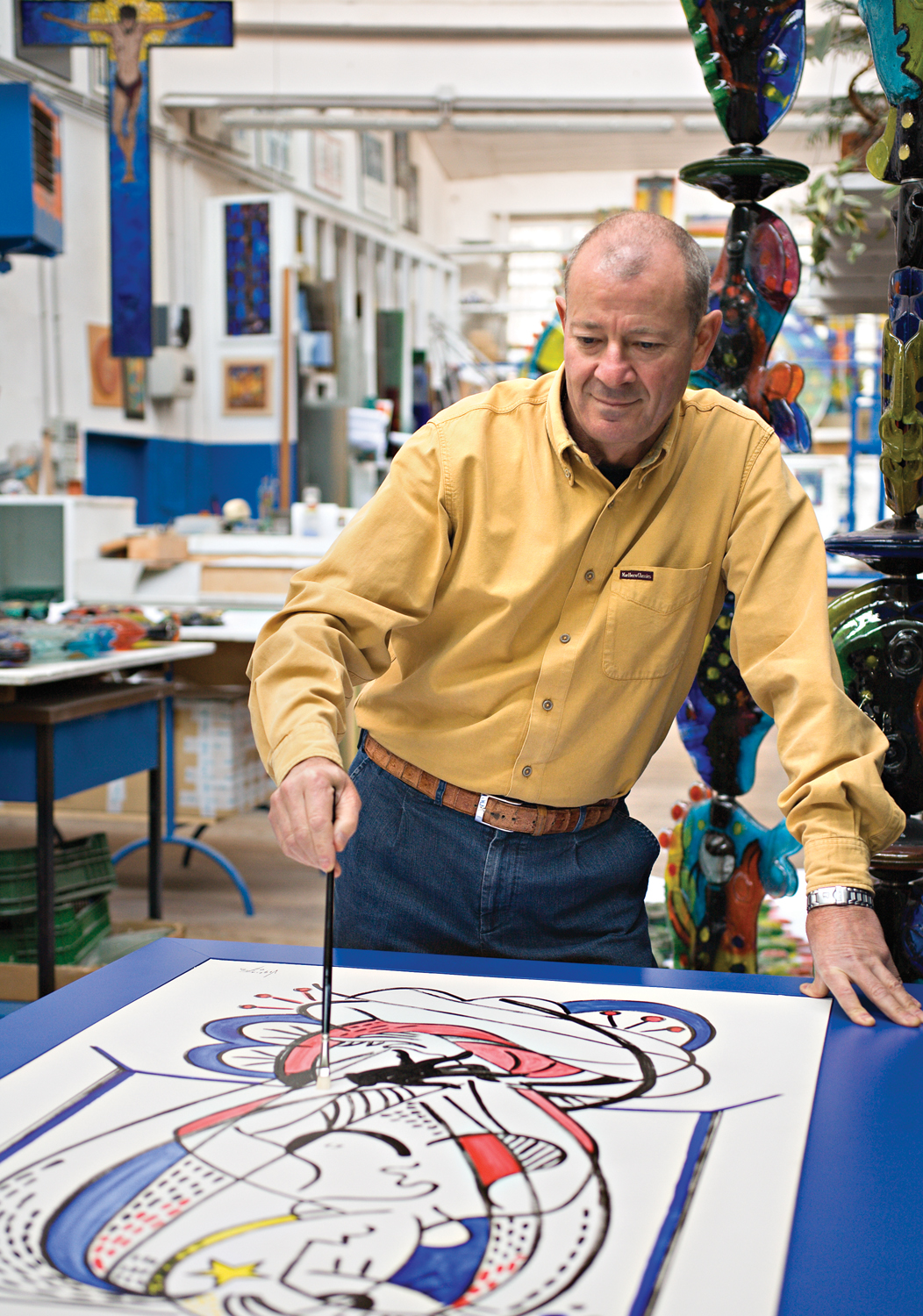
Silvio Vigliaturo

Silvio Vigliaturo (born 1949) is an Italian artist. He is a glassfusion maestro and his technique is appreciated internationally and considered unique in his genre by the most important Italian and foreign critics. (Note: "Silvio Vigliaturo stands out among all the glass artists of the world, and that’s because of his unique method of work and what results from it: the beauty and the oblique harmony of his two and three-dimensional works of art.")

== Life ==
Vigliaturo was born in 1949 in Acri, province of Cosenza. When still a child he moved to Chieri, where presently he lives and works.

== Artistic traits ==
Vigliaturo's artistic journey is one of constant evolution. The never-ending research on colours and forms is symptomatic of a perpetual struggle in favour of the purity of colours and matter's expressive richness. A journey both gradual and tenacious, that led the artist to confront himself with a great variety of themes with different styles and instruments. Glass, steel, terra cotta and painting (Note: "Vigliaturo's creations have an instinctive impact and seem to release a strong positive energy, bursting with Mediterranean colour and spirit. In a time where the direct relationship between an artist and his material has almost disappeared, refreshingly remind us of the purity of an artist who is the master of his medium.") – which he never abandoned – are treated like matter, but represent as well an ideological choice, an important connotation of both his human and artistic growth. His glass works, which the artist creates in his bottega in Chieri, represent the conflict between the modernity of the image, the sign, the idea and the antiquity of the medium. Labeled as Homo Faber, his works are first thought, then interpreted and lived through a constant symbiotic relationship between mind and industriosity, consciousness and craftsmanship, creativity and visual poignancy. In 2006, while the city of Turin chose him as the only artistic testimonial for the Winter Olympics, in Acri was inaugurated the MACA – Civic Museum of Contemporary Art Silvio Vigliaturo. In 2008 the artist was named testimonial in the world of the UNICAL, University of Calabria.

== List of permanent public collections that exhibit the artist's work ==
- Glass Museum Alterhof Herding, Ernsting, Germany
- Biblioteca Nacional, Madrid, Spain;
- Pinacoteca Civica Palazzo dei Musei, Varallo Sesia, Italy
- Regione Piemonte, Palazzo Lascaris, Turin, Italy
- Museo dell'Automobile, Turin, Italy
- Museo Arte Vetraia, Altare, Italy
- Fundacion Centro Nacional del Vidrio, La Granjia, Segovia, Spain
- Hsinchu Municipal Glass Museum, Hsinchu, Taiwan
- Museo ebraico dei Lumi, Casale Monferrato, Italy
- Province of Turin, Palazzo Cisterna, Turin, Italy
- MACA-Museo civico d'Arte Contemporanea Silvio Vigliaturo, Acri, Italy
- University of Calabria, Arcavacata di Rende, Italy
- Museum of erotic art, Las Vegas, Nevada, United States

== Gallery ==
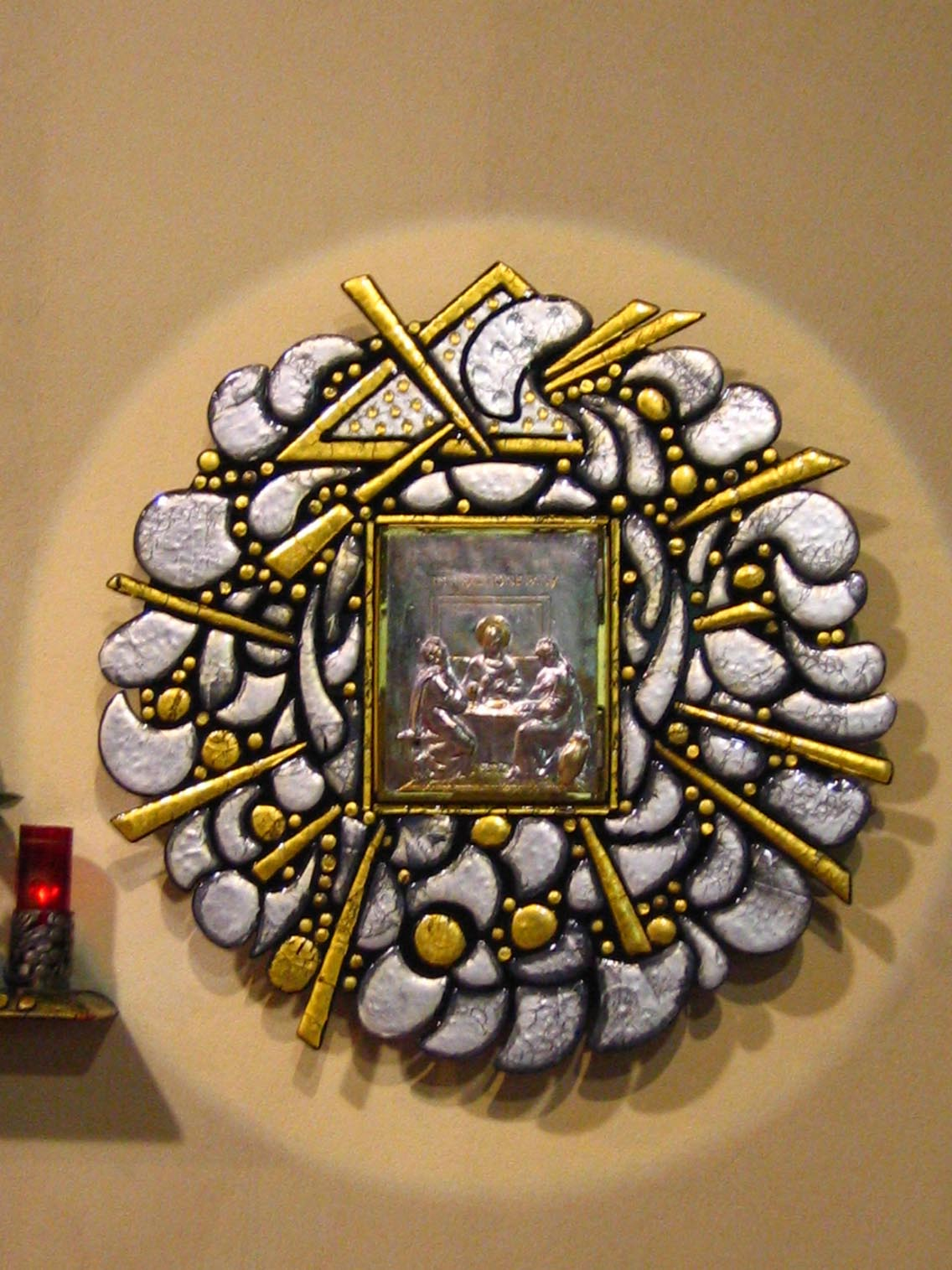
Tabernacolo

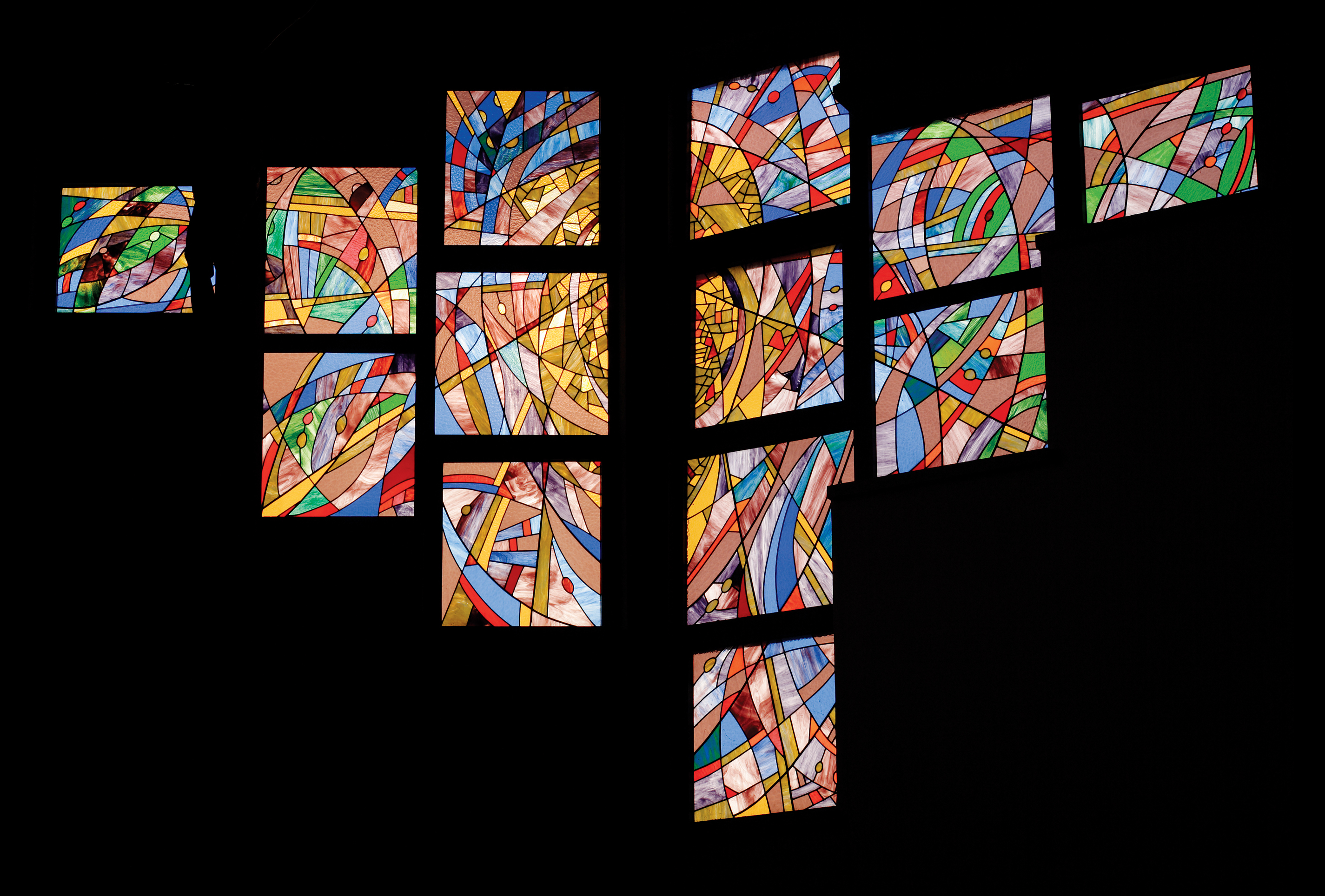
Crocifissione

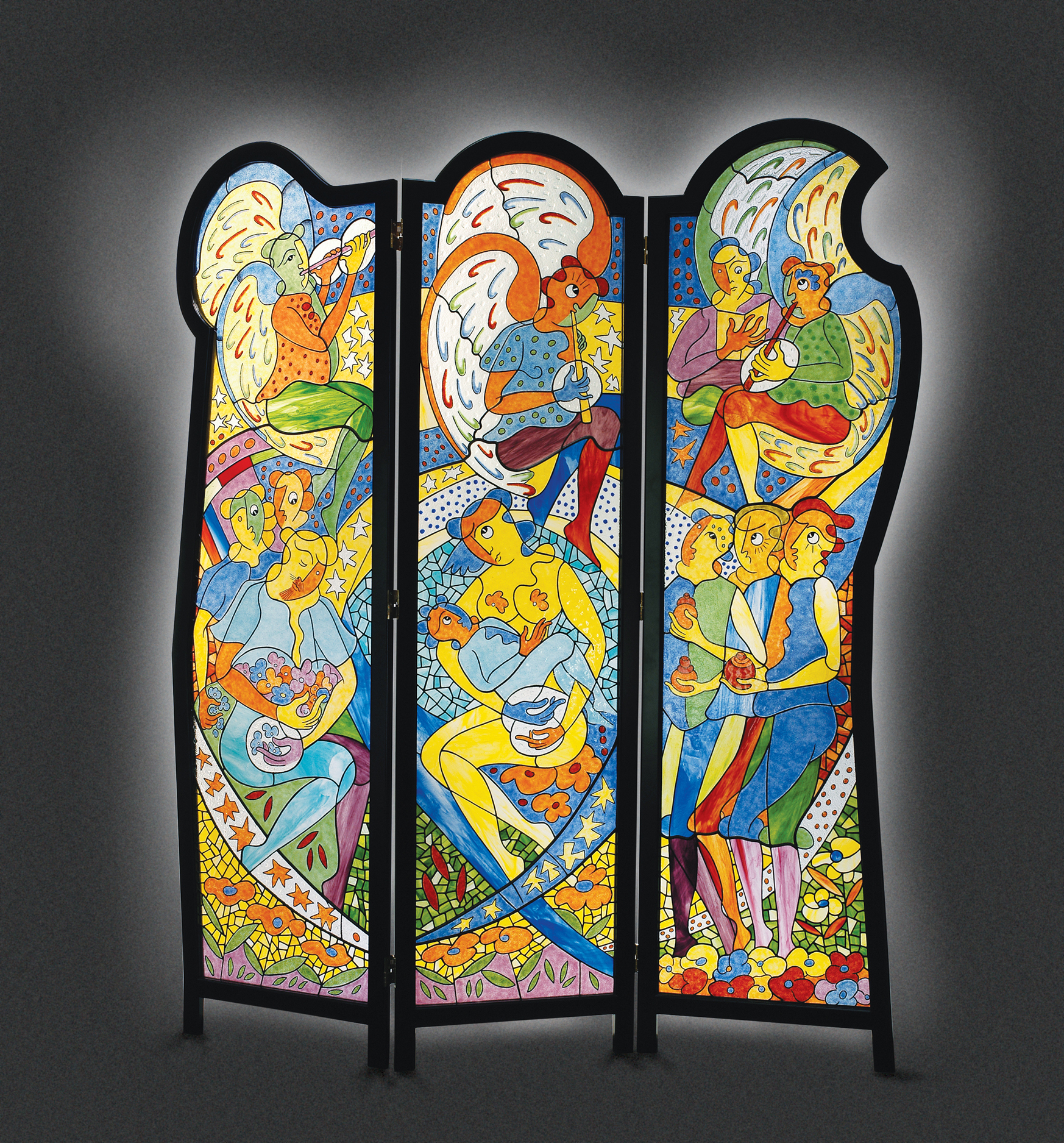
Betlemme

== Bibliography ==
- Artisti e opere. Valle d'Aosta, Piemonte, Liguria, cfr. p. 101, Milan, Giorgio Mondari, 1998. ISBN 88-374-1625-3
- SOFA2004, cfr. p. 53, New York City, Expressions of culture-NY, 2004. ISBN 0-9713714-2-3
- Catalogo degli scultori italiani, cfr. pp. 278–279 e 341, Turin, Giorgio Mondadori, 2006. ISBN 88-6052-043-6
- Vittorio Sgarbi, I giudizi di Sgarbi. 99 artisti dai cataloghi d'arte moderna e dintorni cfr. pp. 200–201 e 233, Turin, Giorgio Mondadori, 2005. ISBN 88-374-1826-4

=== Monographs on the artist ===
- Vibrazioni in vetro, Venice, Marsilio Editori, 1998. ISBN 88-317-6983-9
- Glass and I, Venice, Marsilio Editori, 2000. ISBN 88-317-7669-X
- L'anima del vetro, Venice, Marsilio Editori, 2002. ISBN 88-317-7669-X
- Allusioni e trasparenze: Silvio Vigliaturo, Turin, Giorgio Mondadori, 2004. IT\ICCU\TO0\1665570
- Silvio Vigliaturo. Works, Opere, Scarmagno, Priuli & Verlucca, 2006. ISBN 88-8068-342-X
