= Bodybuilding in China =

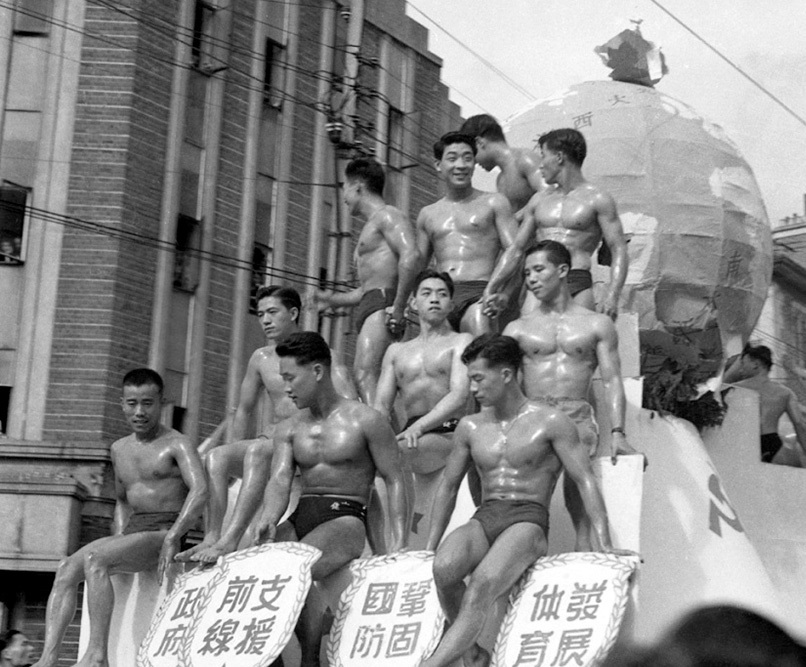
- Shanghainese bodybuilders in the 1950s
- Governing body: Chinese Bodybuilding Association (中国健美协会)
- First played: 1930s

Bodybuilding in China dates back to the 1930s. It was first introduced to the Chinese in Shanghai, when missionary school attendee Zhao Zhuguang started promoting it, having attended overseas bodybuilding courses. However, its early history was marred with controversy, and the Chinese Communist Party, led by Chairman Mao Zedong, publicly condemned the sport and officially banned it in 1953. The ban was only abolished close to three decades later; thereafter, bodybuilding contests for men started to be organised, and China became a member of the International Bodybuilding Federation in 1985. Competitions for women were held soon afterwards. China now has a national federation governing bodybuilding in the country, the Chinese Bodybuilding Association.

== History ==
=== 1930s−1950s: Genesis and later ban by government ===
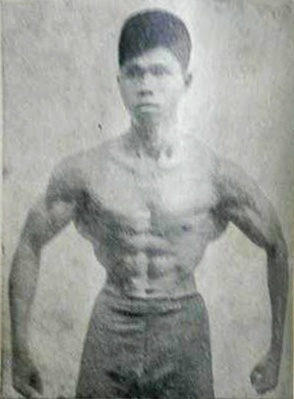
A photo of Zhao Zhuguang from his 1934 bodybuilding manual

Bodybuilding was first practiced in China in the 1930s; Cantonese Zhao Zhuguang (趙竹光), described as the "original Chinese Charles Atlas", is credited with the introduction of bodybuilding to the country. Zhao studied at a missionary school in Shanghai and later went to the United States, where he attended seminars and workshops on bodybuilding to help boost his health and physique. He shared the newfound knowledge with his fellow schoolmates, and together they started promoting the sport at Hujiang University (滬江大學) in Shanghai. In 1934, Zhao Zhuguang authored a book on bodybuilding, titled Muscle Growth Methods (肌肉發達法).

Beijing-based Lin Zhuyin became acquainted with Zhao in the 1940s; he turned into a bodybuilding enthusiast and opened a gym at the local Young Men's Christian Association building. However, there and in other parts of China, bodybuilding only took off with affluent young males whereas many others who were aware of bodybuilding could not afford to practise it for economical, practical, or physical reasons. Nevertheless, it was also well received by the lower classes of Chinese society, namely farmers and blue-collar workers. In 1953, Lin Zhuyin posed for Chinese officials who went on to pan it as a "bourgeois" practice and an "unproductive and narcissistic pursuit of beauty originating in the capitalist West". Furthermore, there was little pragmatic incentive in investing in bodybuilding because it was not a competitive segment in the Olympic Games. The Mao Zedong-led Chinese Communist Party banned bodybuilding that year.

=== 1980s: A new era ===
The ban was in effect for 30 years, until it was officially lifted in 1983. While the ban was still in place, however, many secretly trained under the "father of Chinese bodybuilding", Luo Zhuoyu (娄琢玉), who corresponded with American bodybuilder Joe Weider and the Chinese Weightlifting Federation. The "most influential bodybuilding circular in China", Bodybuilding and Beauty (健与美), and the Chinese Bodybuilding Association staged the first national bodybuilding contest, the Hercules Cup.

The first privately owned health club/or bodybuilding gym was established by Yuan Guohui in 1985. In the same year, China became the 128th member of the global bodybuilding organization, the International Bodybuilding Federation. Female participants were allowed to register for the first time, albeit with the stipulation of only being able to pose in bathing suits. Whether women should be allowed to compete in bikinis was a matter of excited discussion, leading to a "bikini controversy". International standards held that women were to wear them. The 1986 Hercules Cup in Shenzhen was the first tournament in China to feature bikini-wearing competitors. The 1980s also saw a surge in the number of fitness schools and sportswear stores in China.

=== 1990s−present: Advancements ===
China joined the International Federation of Bodybuilding and Fitness (IFBB) in 1990. By-and-by, it has become an active player in the global bodybuilding scene. For instance, the 59th IFBB World Amateur Bodybuilding Championships for men, and the accompanying international bodybuilding summit and expo, was hosted in Shanghai in November 2005.

== Governance ==
Bodybuilding in China is governed on the national level by the Chinese Bodybuilding Association (中国健美协会), often abbreviated as the Chinese Fitness Committee (中国健协). The association was founded on 8 September 1992. Shanghai, considered the bodybuilding hub of China, is under the jurisdiction of the Shanghai Bodybuilding Association.

== See also ==
- Sport in China
