= Francesco Maria Greco =

Italian Roman Catholic priest

Blessed Francesco Maria Greco
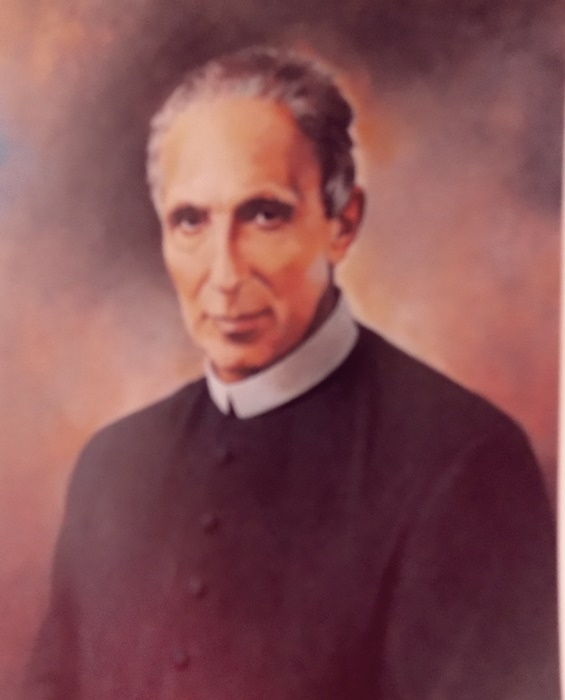

Priest
- Born: 26 July 1857; Acri, Cosenza, Kingdom of the Two Sicilies
- Died: 13 January 1931 (aged 73); Acri, Cosenza, Kingdom of Italy
- Resting place: Mother house of the Little Workers of the Sacred Hearts Acri Cosenza
- Venerated in: Roman Catholic Church
- Beatified: 21 May 2016, Cosenza, Italy by Cardinal Angelo Amato
- Feast: 13 January

Francesco Maria Greco (26 July 1857 – 13 January 1931) was an Italian Roman Catholic priest who served in the Archdiocese of Cosenza. Along with Raffaela De Vincentis in 1894, he established the Little Workers of the Sacred Hearts. Greco served as both a pastor and a professor who operated in Cosenza and opened a catechetical school and hospital service for the poor.

The cause of beatification commenced several decades after his death in a diocesan process that granted him the title of Servant of God. Pope John Paul II proclaimed him to be Venerable in 2004 after the recognition of his life of heroic virtue. Pope Francis approved a miracle attributed to him in 2016, which allowed for his beatification, which was celebrated in Cosenza on 21 May 2016. Cardinal Angelo Amato presided over the celebration on behalf of the pontiff.

== Life ==
Francesco Maria Greco was born in Acri in 1857 to Raffaele Greco and Concetta Pancaro as the second of five children; one brother was Filippo Greco.

His father - a pharmacist - wanted Greco to work with him, but the latter desired to follow a religious path and denied his father the chance to work with him. He commenced his studies in Calabria and was ordained to the priesthood on 17 December 1881. He continued his studies and obtained a doctorate in theological studies in Naples on 22 August 1885. He began to teach seminarians in Cosenza as a professor. On 16 September 1887, he was appointed as the pastor of the San Nicolo parish in Acri, where he organized the opening of a hospital dubbed "Caritas". He opened a catechetical school and a centre for adolescents in that parish on 6 July 1888. From 1892 until 1895, he served as a theological professor in Bisignano.

In 1894, alongside Raffaele De Vincenti, the priest established the Little Workers of the Sacred Hearts religious congregation to promote evangelization and promotion to the Sacred Heart. The order would spread in Europe to Albania while expanding as far as India in Asia and in South America to Argentina and Brazil. The Archbishop of Cosenza Camillo Sorgente approved the order on a local level on 17 February 1902 while Pope Pius XII would grant papal assent to the order following Greco's death on 7 July 1940.

He died in 1931 of a severe case of bronchitis. His remains were exhumed on 19 May 1961 as part of the canonical process for his beatification.

== Beatification process ==
The beatification process commenced in Cosenza in 1957, and it concluded its business on 31 October 1977; this process granted Greco the posthumous title Servant of God as the first stage in the sainthood process. The Congregation for the Causes of Saints approved the process as being valid in 1990 and received the Positio in 1994 for further evaluation.

Pope John Paul II declared Greco to be Venerable on 19 April 2004 after he had recognized that the late priest lived a model Christian life of heroic virtue.

On 8 November 2002, a local process in Calabria commenced in order to investigate a potential miracle and closed almost a decade later on 17 November 2011. The Congregation approved the process on 1 June 2012. The miracle was approved in 2015 after both the medical board and theologians advising the Congregation granted their assent to the healing being a miracle.

The current postulator of the cause is the Franciscan Giovangiuseppe Califano.

It was reported in 2016 that the beatification of Greco would receive papal approval and would be celebrated in Cosenza on 17 July 2016. The report suggested that the mayor Nicola Tenuta had appointed the day for the beatification, should it be approved in time for preparations to commence. A report less than a month later confirmed that the diocese would celebrate the beatification sometime in May 2016 on account of imminent papal approval of the miracle.

Pope Francis approved the miracle attributed to him in 2016, and this approval allowed for his beatification to take place on 21 May 2016, which was announced the same day news of his beatification was made public. Cardinal Angelo Amato presided over the celebration on the pope's behalf.
