= World War I Memorial (East Providence, Rhode Island) =

- U.S. National Register of Historic Places
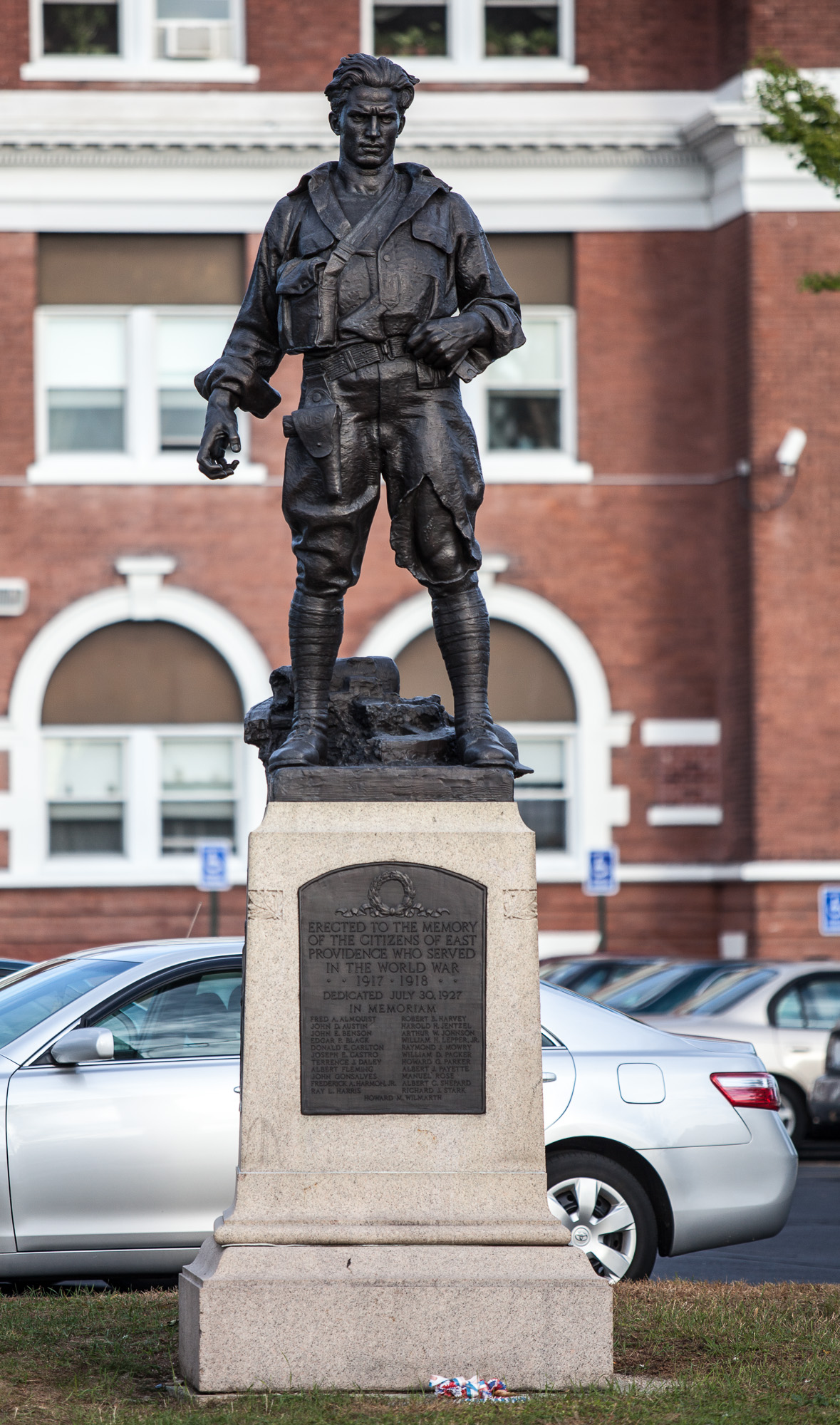
- The memorial's statue and base in 2012

- Location within Rhode Island Location within the United States
- Location: East Providence, Rhode Island
- Coordinates: 41°49′10″N 71°22′15″W
- Built: 1927
- MPS: Outdoor Sculpture of Rhode Island
- NRHP reference No.: 01000466
- Added to NRHP: October 19, 2001

The World War I Memorial is a bronze sculpture by Pietro Montana and is located at the intersection of Taunton Avenue, Whelden Avenue, and John Street in East Providence, Rhode Island, United States. The sculpture is modeled on Charles Atlas and depicts a dynamically posed soldier standing on a granite base. Montana's original design was modified by the East Providence Memorial Committee for being "too brutal". Dedicated on July 30, 1927, Major General Charles Pelot Summerall gave an address which highlighted the handicap placed upon the soldiers by a lack of preparedness and "invoked the fighting ideal embodied by Montana's doughboy." The World War I Memorial was added to the National Register of Historic Places in 2001.

== Design ==
The World War I Memorial was designed by Pietro Montana, an Italian-born painter and sculptor. Montana studied at the Cooper Union for the Advancement of Science and Art in Manhattan, New York City, New York. Montana's monuments were well-known, particularly in New York, and included an earlier "Doughboy" sculpture erected in 1920 to honor the war dead of the Bushwick, Brooklyn and Ridgewood, Queens. The success of this the earlier "Fighting Doughboy" memorial resulted in the production of three copies by 1921. By 1932, he had produced over 40 statues and won a gold medal from the National Academy of Design for "Orphans" in 1931.

For the design of the sculpture, Montana modeled Charles Atlas and "strove to communicate the U.S. doughboy's upstanding character and valor by way of a muscle-bound physique". In 1926, the East Providence Memorial Committee expressed concerns that Montana's design was "too brutal" and modified the original design provided by Montana. The statue was erected in 1927, and formally dedicated on July 30, 1927. At the dedication, Major General Charles Pelot Summerall gave an address which highlighted the handicap placed upon the soldiers by a lack of preparedness and "invoked the fighting ideal embodied by Montana's doughboy."

The sculpture of a soldier stands 7.75 feet (2.36 m) tall, 2.583 feet (0.787 m) wide and 2.66 feet (0.81 m) deep. Ronald J. Onorato, author of the National Register nomination, writes that "the soldier stands with legs apart, his left hand at his belt, the right at his side. The face is impassive and expressionless. He wears a disheveled infantry uniform, rough shoes, the shirt collar open and askew, the sleeves rolled back, the knee torn open, his helmet on the ground behind his left foot. ... A holster hangs from the belt on the soldier's right hip." Montana signed the sculpture with "Pietro Montana/SC/1927."

The sculpture rests atop a grey granite base that is 6.33 feet (1.93 m) tall, 3.166 feet (0.965 m) wide and 3.5 feet (1.1 m) deep. The corners of the base have small leaf designed and has 2 feet (0.61 m) by 2.66 feet (0.81 m) bronze reliefs with arched tops on each side. The front relief states that it was erected in the memory of the citizens of East Providence who served in World War I from 1917 to 1918, and lists the names of twenty three soldiers. The left relief depicts a marching infantry column of one man on horseback and four on foot, the right relief depicts four or five men loading a cannon and the rear relief depicts a nurse assisting two wounded soldiers.

At the time of its nomination, the sculpture was described as in "moderately good condition", with the surface being both stained and pitted, but free or breaks or missing pieces. The statue still stands in its original location in front of a school that has since been re-purposed for residential housing.

== Importance ==
The World War I Memorial designed by Montana is "historically significant as the city's principal effort to honor those who served in the first World War and because it is an unusually successful depiction of the soldier in battle." The larger-than-life masculine figure depicted in the sculpture stands apart from the stock figures of other war monuments by its dynamic pose, as if the soldier was "[arising from] the heat of battle". It was added to the National Register of Historic Places on October 19, 2001.

== See also ==
- National Register of Historic Places listings in Providence County, Rhode Island
