= Zaltman metaphor elicitation technique =

Market research tool

The Zaltman metaphor elicitation technique (ZMET) is a market research tool. ZMET is a technique that elicits both conscious and especially unconscious thoughts by exploring people's non-literal or metaphoric expressions. It was developed by Gerald Zaltman at the Harvard Business School in the early 1990s. As Zaltman described it, "A lot goes on in our minds that we're not aware of. Most of what influences what we say and do occurs below the level of awareness. That's why we need new techniques: to get at hidden knowledge-to get at what people don't know they know." The technique has been used by academic researchers and for marketing purposes to study a variety of topics related to both marketing and the social sciences.

== Origins of ZMET ==
Zaltman began thinking about the power of using imagery in research while on vacation in Nepal in 1990. Zaltman initially planned to bring his camera but at the last minute opted to chronicle the trip by giving local residents disposable cameras and asking them to take pictures that would explain what life was like in their villages. After developing the pictures, Zaltman returned to the village to ask residents to explain, through an interpreter, the meaning of the photographs. The imagery tended to reveal ideas that would have been difficult or unacceptable to put into words. For example, the photographers often cut off people’s feet in the photographs. This was intentional. In Nepal, bare feet are a sign of poverty. Zaltman believed that because of the stigma associated with poverty, the topic likely would not have surfaced had the villages been asked to describe life in their villages using just words. ZMET was patented in 1995 and the original patent expired in 2015.

== The ZMET research process ==
Research study participants are usually asked to collect a set of pictures that represent their thoughts and feelings about the topic of interest. Zaltman cites prominent researchers like Steven Pinker and Antonio Damasio to support his claim that humans think in images – often in the form of visual images – rather than in words. The pictures that participants collect are important non-literal devices for uncovering deeply held, often unconscious, thoughts and feelings.

The goal of the ZMET interviews and analysis is to uncover the relevant fundamental structures that guide people’s thinking about a topic. These deep structures are unconscious, basic orienting frames of human thought that affect how people process and react to information or a stimulus. They manifest themselves in surface metaphors used in everyday language and conversation; when grouped they point to the deeper frames or structures a person is using to understand a topic (see framing). These frames can be used in a marketing context to help marketers communicate more effectively to consumers about a brand, product, or topic.

== Applications of ZMET ==
Oticon, a Danish manufacturer of hearing aids, applied ZMET to understand the negative connotations that people associated with hearing aids. They felt, although many people used cost as a reason to postpone the purchase of a hearing aid, there were deeper factors at work. Hearing aids were described as a symbol of being seen as old and flawed. Oticon responded by creating a hearing aid with a new, fashionable styling in an attempt to counter this stereotype.

In a study for Children’s Hospital of Pittsburgh of UPMC, ZMET discovered that the metaphors of “transformation” and “control” were critical to the experience of patients and their families within the hospital. The architectural firm Astorino translated this into a "Transformation Corridor" that connects the main parking garage to the central lobby. Along the walls of the 260-foot corridor is a butterfly motif, which, along with terrazzo floor pattern, changes to represent the changing of the seasons. The hospital also incorporated a modular patient room design, intended to give patients and their families the ability to customize their living space.

ZMET research was critical to the launch of the odor-removing spray, Febreze by Procter & Gamble.

ZMET has been used in academic and not-for-profit environments to study a range of topics including perceptions of climate change, the experience of attending a county fair, mountain biking, how women recover from substance abuse, the relationship between video game players and their avatars, how Americans were dealing with the economic crisis, and the value of an insight in the workplace.

== Books that reference ZMET ==
- Marketing Insights from A to Z: 80 Concepts Every Manager Needs to Know by Philip Kotler (Hardcover – Mar 3, 2003)
- Advertising and Integrated Brand Promotion by Thomas O'Guinn, Chris Allen, and Richard J. Semenik (Hardcover – April 18, 2008)
- Clued In: How to Keep Customers Coming Back Again and Again by Lewis Carbone (Hardcover – May 24, 2004)
- Brand Aid: An Easy Reference Guide to Solving Your Toughest Branding Problems and Strengthening Your Market Position by Brad VanAuken (Hardcover – Jul 7, 2003)
- Assessment of Couples and Families: Contemporary and Cutting Edge Strategies (The Family Therapy and Counseling Series) by Len Sperry (Hardcover – Jul 21, 2004)
- Habenwollen: Wie funktioniert die Konsumkultur? von Wolfgang Ullrich (Broschiert – 1 January 2008)
- I is an Other: The Secret Life of Metaphor and How It Shapes the Way We See the World by James Geary
- Marketing Metaphoria: What Deep Metaphors Reveal About The Minds of Consumers by Gerald Zaltman and Lindsay Zaltman (Hardcover 2008)

== See also ==
- Gerald Zaltman
- Conceptual blending
- Conceptual metaphor
