= Luca Antonio Falcone =

Christian saint

Saint Luca Antonio Falcone O.F.M. Cap.
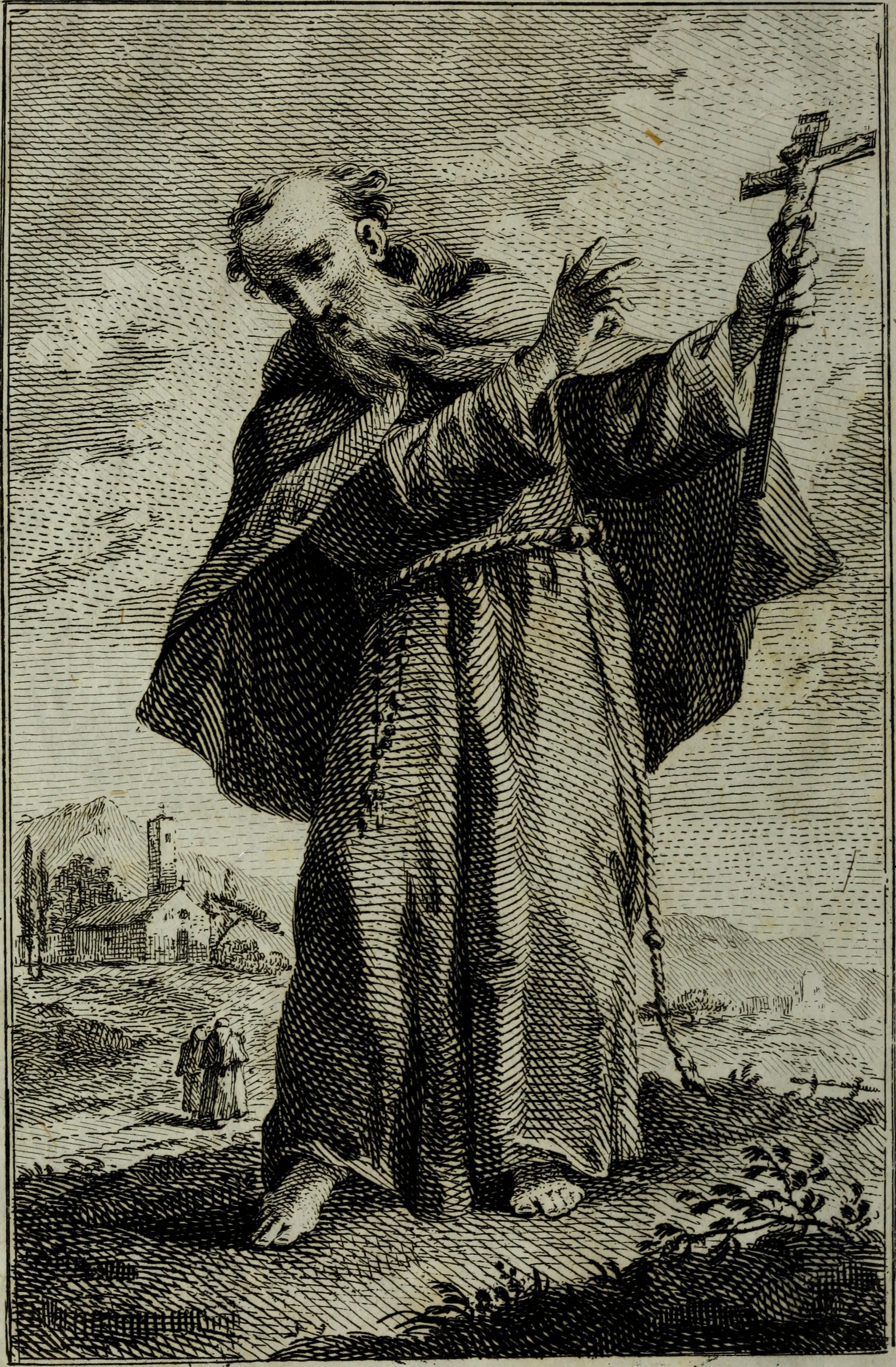
- 1754 image.

Priest
- Born: 19 October 1669; Acri, Cosenza, Calabria
- Died: 30 October 1739 (aged 70); Acri, Cosenza, Calabria
- Venerated in: Roman Catholic Church
- Beatified: 18 December 1825, Saint Peter's Basilica, Papal States by Pope Leo XII
- Canonized: 15 October 2017, Saint Peter's Square, Vatican City by Pope Francis
- Feast: 30 October
- Attributes: Franciscan habit; Rosary; Crucifix
- Patronage: Acri; Missionaries

Luca Antonio Falcone (19 October 1669 – 30 October 1739) – in religious life Angelo – was an Italian Roman Catholic priest and a professed member of the Franciscan Order of Friars Minor Capuchin in Cosenza. Falcone had a rough call to religious life after several entries and exits into the order and he later served as a noted preacher across southern Italian cities such as Catanzaro and Salerno after his first few sermons attracted little following. He became titled as both the "Angel of Peace" and the "Apostle of the South".

Falcone became known for ecstasies during the celebration of Mass and was known for converting the hearts of thousands when he went about preaching. The friar possessed the gifts of visions and bilocation and was invited to start preaching in the Neapolitan region at the behest of Cardinal Francesco Pignatelli.

He received beatification from Pope Leo XII on 18 December 1825 after being titled as a Servant of God in 1778 under Pope Pius VI and Venerable under Pope Pius VII on 17 June 1821. He is a patron of Acri and of missionaries. Pope Francis approved his canonization and it was determined at a gathering of cardinals on 20 April 2017 that Falcone would be named as a saint; the canonization was celebrated in Saint Peter's Square on 15 October 2017.

== Life ==
Luca Antonio Falcone was born in Cosenza on 19 October 1669 to Francesco Falcone and Diana Enrico – poor parents of humble and pious stock. He had an uncle who was a priest. Falcone received the sacrament of Confirmation on 24 June 1674.

In 1684 he met a charismatic friar – Antonio da Olivadi – from the Franciscans proved to be decisive for him in realizing and pursuing his call to the religious life. He was admitted into the Order of Friars Minor Capuchin in 1687 and was clothed in the habit in 1688 but a few months later returned home after the rigorous life frightened him. He believed at this time that he was being called to settle down and enter into the sacrament of marriage rather than pursue the religious life; his priest uncle encouraged this belief. He decided this was not for him and re-entered on 8 November 1689 but – after being scared once more – fled back home. On his knees before a Crucifix he begged: "Assist me with Your grace!" He requested for readmission for the third and final time on 12 November 1690 and began his novitiate. His theological studies spanned from 1695 until 1700.

He completed his novitiate on 12 November 1691 at 6:00pm and made his profession to the novice master Giovanni d'Orsomarso while being elevated into the diaconate on 18 December 1694. He was ordained to the priesthood in the Cassano all'Jonio Cathedral on 10 April 1700. He consecrated each hour as a priest to some aspect of the Passion of Jesus Christ. He led a Lenten sermon in 1702 in the town of San Giorgio Morgeto at the behest of his provincial and began to address his people but could not remember what he was to continue with and so was forced to leave the pulpit confused.

The Cardinal Archbishop of Naples Francesco Pignatelli soon learned of Falcone's prowess in 1711 and called him to preach in Naples and the surrounding areas that composed the archdiocese. He struggled with his first three sermons – which all turned out to be miserable – with people laughing at him at the first and almost no one at the following two. The worried parish priest begged Pignatelli to find another but the cardinal refused and put his trust in Falcone. At the fourth sermon more people turned up and at the end he asked the people to turn their hearts and minds to one who would soon die among them; as the people left a well-known man died of a stroke – who led opposition to his preaching – leading to his sermons gathering greater numbers. Overcoming this challenge led to him becoming a famous and sought after preacher. People requested him from all over in southern Italian cities and was known for the conversion of the hearts of thousands of people; he preached in places such as Taranto and Montecassino.

His preaching earned him the two monikers of the "Angel of Peace" and the "Apostle of the South". He served as provincial father from 1717 until 1720 and was made general visitor in 1735; he served as novice master several times. Falcone possessed prophetic gifts as well as being able to receive visions while he possessed bilocation and could see into men's souls in the sacrament of confession. In 1724 he began construction of the convent of Cappuccinelle which opened on 17 June 1726.

Falcone died on 30 October 1739 at the convent he was stationed at in Cosenza; he had become blind six months prior but regained his sight enough to continue to recite the Divine Office and celebrate Mass. His remains were relocated in the 1890s to the Basilica del Beato Angelo d'Acri – a church constructed in his honor.

== Canonization ==
The beatification process commenced in the local diocese on 10 October 1744 while the formal introduction for the cause came under Pope Pius VI on 22 May 1778. The process culminated on 17 June 1821 when Pope Pius VII named Falcone as being Venerable after confirming that the late friar had indeed lived a model life of heroic virtue.

The recognition of three miracles attributed to his intercession on 20 November 1825 allowed for Pope Leo XII to preside over his beatification on 18 December 1825. The miracles involved:

- the cure of Marianna Bernaudo from Bisignano
- the cure of Pietro Sacco from Bisignano
- the cure of Francesco Sirimarco from Sant'Agata d'Esaro

The process towards sainthood was formally opened on 22 September 1853. The fourth miracle – the one that would be definitive for full sainthood – was investigated in a diocesan process from 14 March 2014 until 15 December 2014 before it later received validation from the Congregation for the Causes of Saints sometime later. Medical experts advising the C.C.S. met to discuss this miracle (after five previous sessions of other doctors examining it) approved the miracle on 15 December 2016. Theologians likewise approved this sometime later as did the C.C.S. before it was taken to the pope for his approval. Pope Francis approved this miracle on 23 March 2017 thus confirming that Falcone will be canonized in 2017; the date was formalized at a gathering of cardinals on 20 April.

Falcone was proclaimed as a saint on 15 October 2017 in Saint Peter's Square.
