= Pietro Montana =

Italian-American sculptor, painter and teacher

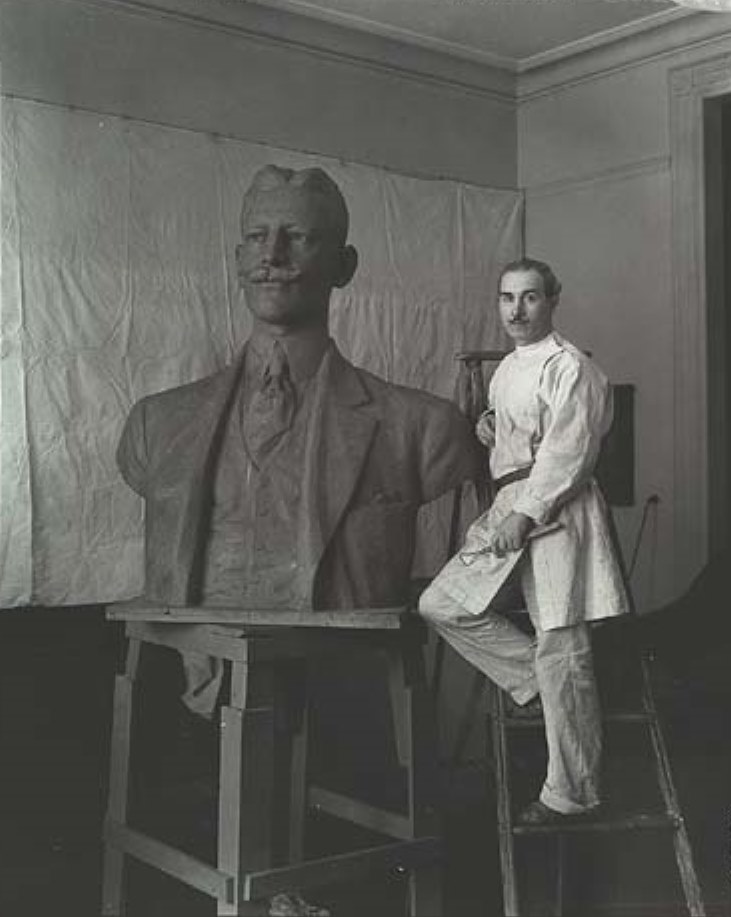
Montana in his studio with his Bust of José di Diego, circa 1934, Smithsonian Museum of American Art.

Pietro Montana (June 29, 1890 – July 6, 1978) was a 20th-century Italian-American sculptor, painter and teacher, noted for his war memorials and religious works.

== Biography ==
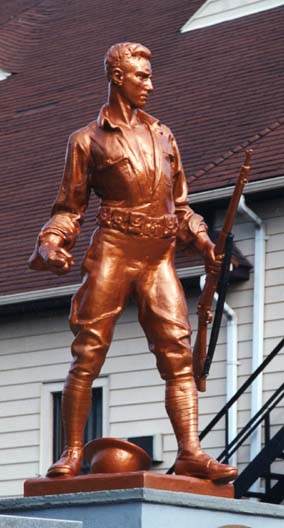
Fighting Doughboy (1926), Wanaque, New Jersey.

He was born in Alcamo, Sicily, the third of six children of Ignazio and Marianna Montana. The family emigrated to the United States in 1904, and settled in Brooklyn, New York City. As a teen, he apprenticed under a photographer, then started his own photography studio in the family home. He attended night classes for six years at the School of Art, Cooper Union, studying under George Thomas Brewster and graduating in 1915. He also studied at the Mechanics Institute.

He made a spectacular professional debut with Fighting Doughboy, the winner in a 1919 war memorial design competition sponsored by the Unity Republican Club of Brooklyn. Rather than a conventional passive figure, he modeled an aggressive soldier with clenched fist, ready to throw a punch. The lifesize sculpture was unveiled in Heisser Park on November 20, 1921. Bronze replicas are in North Arlington, New Jersey; and Alliance, Ohio. Zinc replicas, cast by the J. W. Fiske Architectural Metals Company of New York City, are in Riverdale, New Jersey; Suffern, New York; and elsewhere.

That same year he unveiled a traditional Beaux Arts sculpture for Brooklyn's Freedom Square Park – Victory with Peace – a classical nike (winged goddess), but one who holds aloft an olive branch, instead of a sword.

His next commission, The Dawn of Glory, probably is his most famous work. It depicts the soul of a dead soldier wrapped in an American Flag ascending to heaven. The sculpture is a one-and-one-half-lifesize nude, and the bodybuilder Charles Atlas (born Angelo Siciliano) posed for it. It was unveiled in Brooklyn's Highland Park on July 13, 1924.

His Minute Man sculpture for the World War I memorial in East Providence, Rhode Island, is even more intimidating than Fighting Doughboy. The physicality of the soldier is striking – the model was Charles Atlas, again – and the knife he clutches (now broken) along with his slashed trousers and wounded thigh suggest that he has just emerged as victor from bloody hand-to-hand combat. The monument was dedicated on July 30, 1927.

His last large-scale war memorial was for the town of Mirabella Imbaccari, Sicily, and was commissioned by Sicilian-Americans living in New York City. It features a bronze, one-and-one-half-lifesize centurion – nude, but for belt, helmet and cape – who protects and comforts a clothed woman collapsed at his feet. Monumento ai Caduti (Monument to the Fallen) was unveiled in 1938, almost twenty years after the end of World War I.

He modeled a bust of Italian engineer Guglielmo Marconi for the 1939 New York World's Fair, and later donated it to the Engineers' Hall of Fame.

Montana co-founded the Leonardo da Vinci School of Art in the late-1920s, where he taught for several years. In the 1930s, he taught at the Roerich Academy of Arts. As artist-in-residence at Fordham University from 1947 to 1952, he taught painting and sculpture, and executed a number of school commissions. Most notable among these are the fourteen Stations of the Cross bas-relief panels in the University Chapel, which feature half-lifesize figures carved out of white oak.

He created commemorative medallions, including two sets of religious medallions for the Franklin Mint. Copies of his 1957 St. Francis of Assisi medallion for the Society of Medalists are in the collections of the Metropolitan Museum of Art, the Museum of Fine Arts, Boston, and other museums.

=== Honors ===
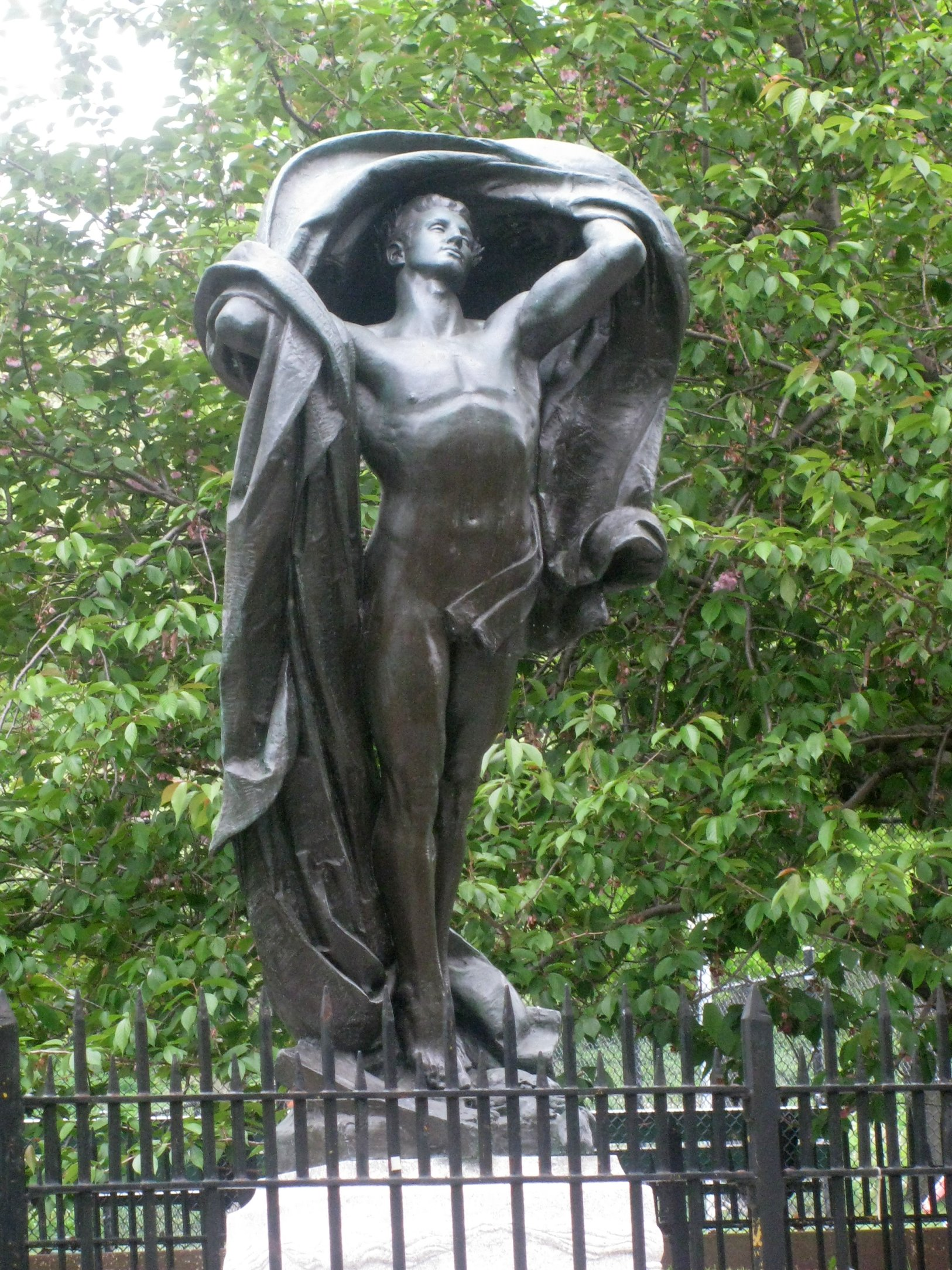
The Dawn of Glory (1924), Highland Park War Memorial, Brooklyn, New York.

He exhibited at the Pennsylvania Academy of the Fine Arts — 1919, 1920, 1924, 1930–1936, 1943–1948; the National Academy of Design — 1918, 1919, 1921, 1931 (Gold Medal for Orphans); the Allied Artists of America — 1932–1949 (Gold Medals 1942 & 1949); and elsewhere.

He was elected an associate of the National Academy of Design in 1968, and an academician in 1970. He was also a member of the National Sculpture Society and the Allied Artists of America.

He received the Daniel Chester French Medal for Religious Sculpture, the Allied Artists of America Award, the Medal of Honor of the Catholic Fine Arts Society and the award of the National Academy of Design.

=== Personal ===
He became a naturalized American citizen in 1921. He married Alfrieda Kramer on April 3, 1930, and they lived in Brooklyn, and later Manhattan. The couple moved to Rome, Italy in 1962, where they resided until Alfrieda's death in 1975. Montana returned to the United States and lived with a niece in Bayville, New York.

Late in life, he donated many of his smaller works to Fordham University and to Capital University, in Columbus, Ohio. He donated his papers to the Archives of American Art at the Smithsonian Institution. A year before his death, he completed an autobiography.

The Pietro and Alfrieda Montana Memorial Prize is awarded annually by the National Sculpture Society.

== Selected works ==
=== War memorials ===
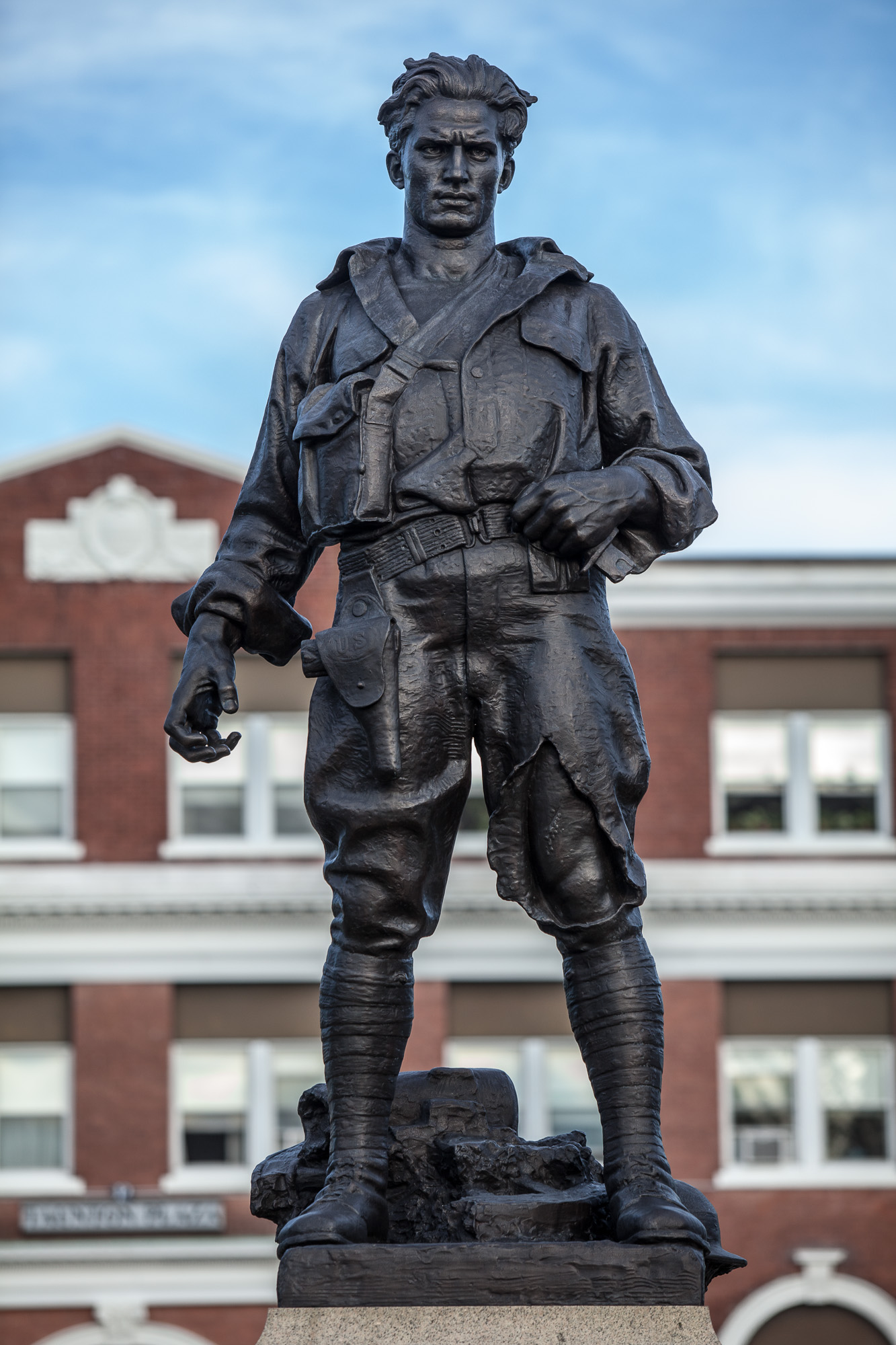
Minute Man (1927), World War I Memorial, East Providence, Rhode Island.

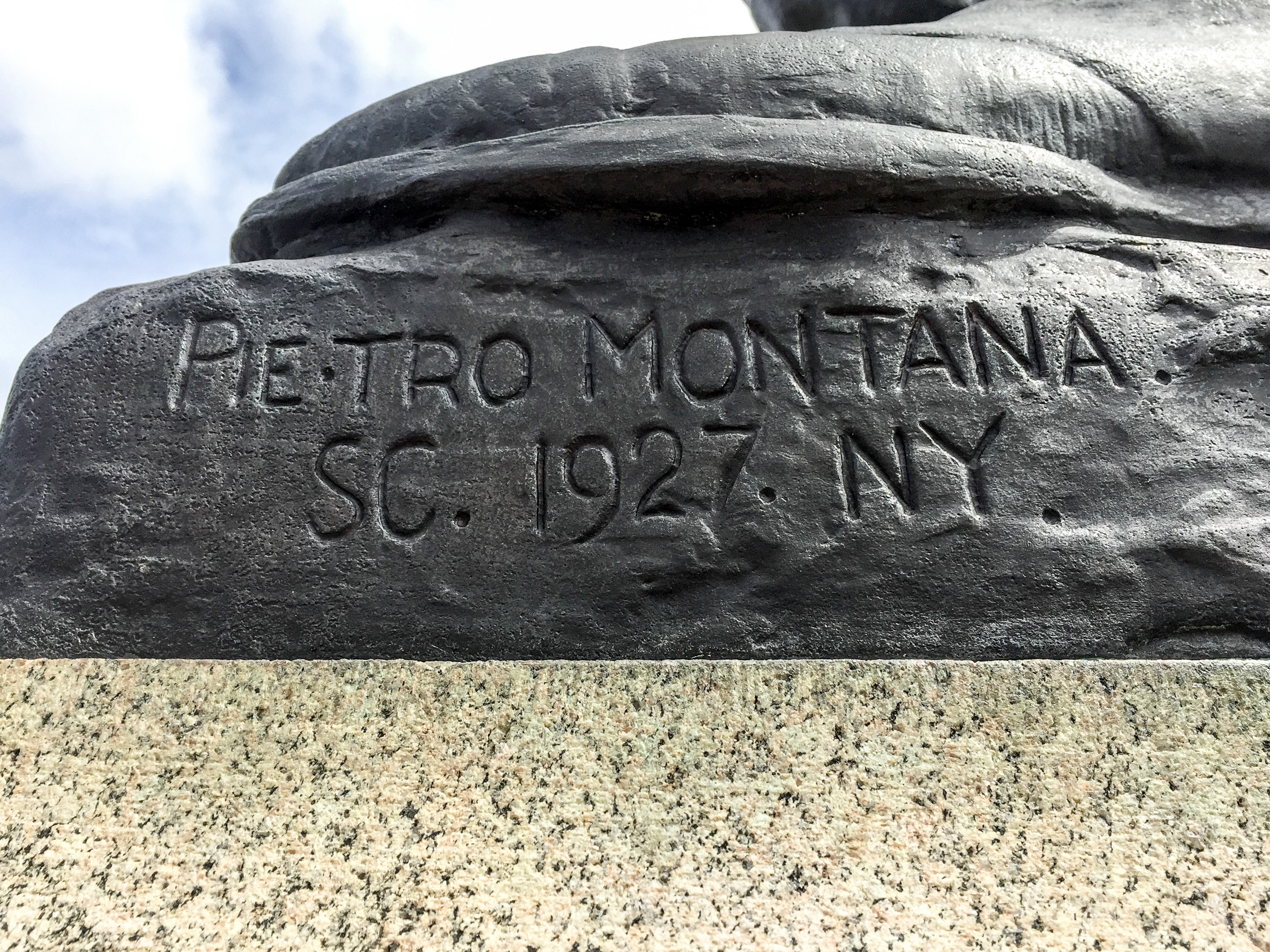
Montana's name on the World War I Memorial in East Providence, Rhode Island.

- Fighting Doughboy (bronze, 1919–21), Bushwick-Ridgewood World War Memorial, Heisser Park, Myrtle & Knickerbocker Avenues, Brooklyn, New York, Giles Pollard Greene (1888–1941), architect.
  - Fighting Doughboy (zinc, 1921), Soldiers Monument, Washington & Lafayette Avenues, Suffern, New York.
  - Fighting Doughboy (zinc, circa 1923), Riverdale Public School, Pompton-Newark Turnpike, Riverdale, New Jersey.
  - Fighting Doughboy (bronze, 1924), Soldiers' Memorial, Borough Hall, 3 Legion Place, North Arlington, New Jersey.
  - Fighting Doughboy (zinc, 1926), Wanaque War Memorial, Borough Hall, Wanaque, New Jersey. Instead of a clenched fist, the doughboy has a grenade in his right hand.
  - Fighting Doughboy (bronze 1922 casting, repaired 2001), Weybrecht family plot, City Cemetery, Alliance, Ohio.
- Victory with Peace (1921), Freedom Triangle War Memorial, Myrtle & Bushwick Avenues, Brooklyn, New York, William H. Deacy, architect.
- Dawn of Glory (1924), Highland Park War Memorial, Jamaica Avenue & Cleveland Street, Brooklyn, New York.
- Minute Man (1927), World War I Memorial, Taunton Avenue & Wheldon Street, East Providence, Rhode Island.
- Monumento ai Caduti (Monument to the Fallen) (1938), Palazzo Biscari, Mirabella Imbaccari, Sicily, Italy.

=== Religious works ===
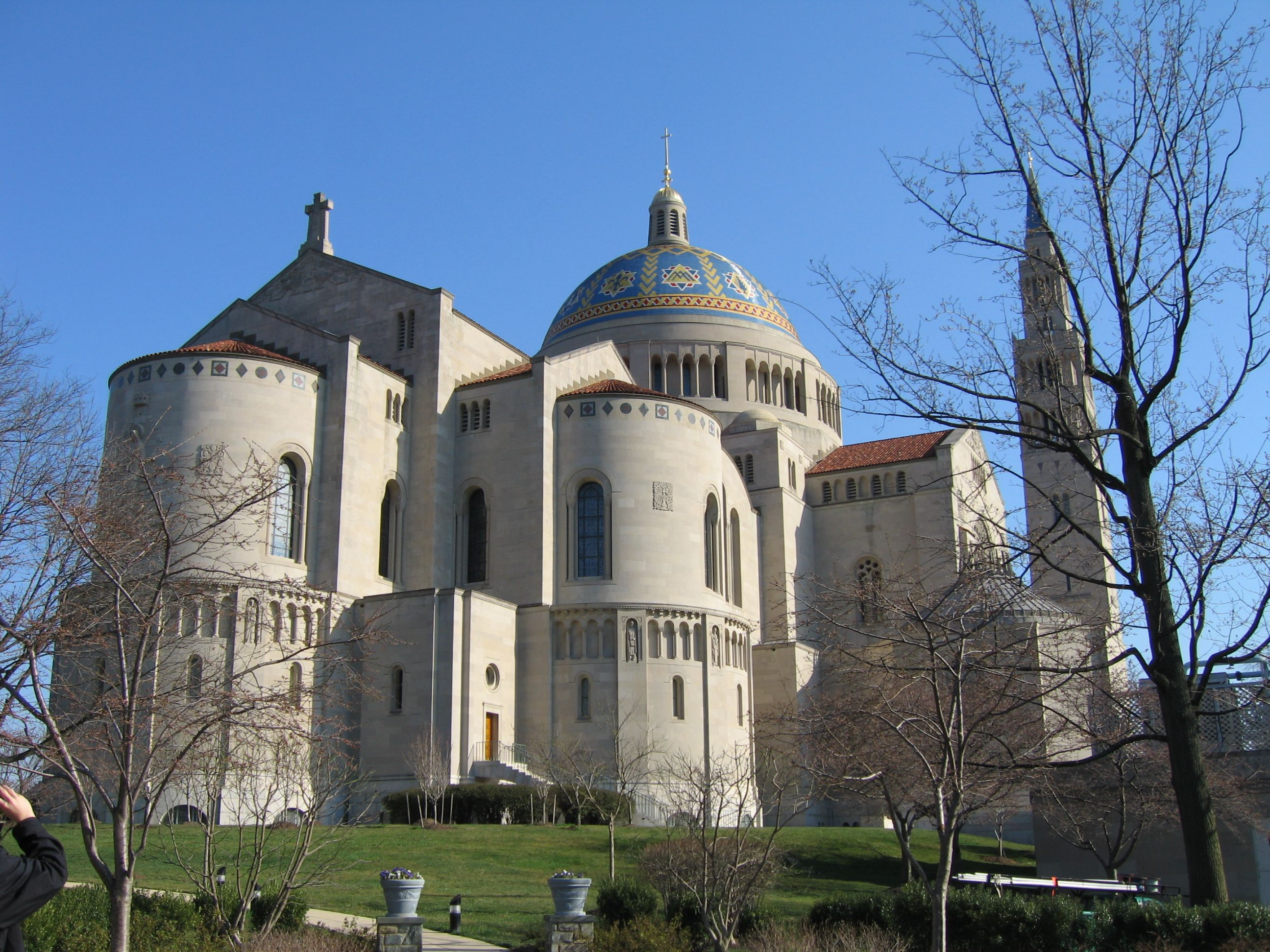
Basilique du Sanctuaire National de l'Immaculée Conception, Washington, D.C.

- Head of Christ, Civic Library S.Bagolino, Alcamo, Sicily
- Statuette of St. Francis of Assisi and Three of His Brethren (1940).
- Bas-relief bust of Pope Pius XII (bronze, 1945), Fordham University, New York City.
- Fourteen Stations of the Cross (bas-relief, white oak, 1947–52), War Memorial Chapel, Fordham University, New York City.
- Statue of Blessed Mother Therese Couderc (1953), Convent of Our Lady of the Cenacle, Lake Ronkonkoma, New York. Therese Couderc (1805–1885) was canonized as a saint on September 26, 1970.
- Architectural sculpture on exterior of northwest apse (1959), Basilica of the National Shrine of the Immaculate Conception, Washington, D.C.
  - Statuette of St. Patrick
  - Statuette of St. Boniface
  - Statuette of St. Cyril
  - Statuette of St. Methodius
- Statue of St. John the Baptist (marble, year?), Church of St. Jean Baptiste, 184 East 76th Street, New York City.
- Statue of St. Expeditus the Martyr (year?), St. Patrick Cathedral, Fort Worth, Texas
- Statue of St. Michael (year?), Eymard Preparatory Seminary, Hyde Park, New York.
- Memorial (year?), Church of St. Philip Neri, Grand Concourse, Bronx, New York City.

=== Other works ===
- Mark Twain– Washington Irving Memorial Tablet (bas-relief busts, bronze, 1925), Brevoort Hotel, SW corner of Fifth Avenue & 9th Street, New York City. Twain and Irving, at different times, occupied a house at 21 Fifth Avenue.
- Bust of "Mother" Davison (bronze, 1925), Fort Jay, Governors Island, New York City.
- Catherine I. Carroll Memorial Tablet (bas-relief, bronze, 1927), Metropolitan Recreation Center, Williamsburg, Brooklyn, New York.
- Bust of José Di Diego (bronze, 1934–35), Plaza de Diego, Mayagüez, Puerto Rico. Gift of Oscar Bravo. A heroic-sized bust set on a high plinth.
- Bust of Guglielmo Marconi (bronze, 1939), Institute of Electrical and Electronics Engineers Hall of Fame, New York City. Exhibited at the 1939 New York World's Fair.
- Bas-relief bust of Guglielmo Marconi (bronze, year?), Freeman Hall, Fordham University.
- Bust of Ignazio Calandrino, a poet from Alcamo; Civic Library Sebastiano Bagolino of Alcamo
- Garden sculpture (1954), Norrviken Gardens, Båstad, Sweden.
- Mutual Trust (marble, year?), Old Courthouse, Klippan, Scania, Sweden. A toddler asleep against fawn.
- Bust of Pontiac 1720–1769 (bronze, 1961), National Hall of Fame for Famous American Indians, Anadarko, Oklahoma.
- Monument to Pedro Perea (year?), Mayagüez, Puerto Rico.
- unidentified work (year?), Starr Commonwealth Museum, 26 Mile Road, Albion, Michigan.

=== Medallions and miniatures ===
- Orphans (miniature, bronze, 1931), National Academy of Design, New York City. Won a Gold Medal at the 1931 National Academy of Design Annual Exhibition.
  - Orphans (miniature, black marble), Brookgreen Gardens, Murrell's Inlet, South Carolina.
- Adolph Zukor Silver Jubilee Medallion (1937), Paramount Pictures. Montana also modeled a portrait plaque of Zukor.
- Gold Medal of Honor (1952), Hudson Valley Art Association.
- St. Francis of Assisi Medallion (bronze, 1957), Society of Medalists – 55th issue.
- Vita Christi – 12-medallion set (bronze, 1972), Franklin Mint.
- The Parables of Jesus – 20-medallion set (bronze, 1974), Franklin Mint.

=== Paintings ===
- Training Horses (1944).
- Portrait of Major General Nathaniel A. Burnell II (1957), U.S. Department of Defense.
- Self-portrait (1968), National Academy of Design, New York City.

== Sources ==
- "The Work of Pietro Montana," National Sculpture Review (Summer, 1970).
- Pietro Montana, Memories: An Autobiography (Exposition Press, 1977) ISBN 0-68-248841-0
- "Pietro Montana, at 88, A Painter and Sculptor". The New York Times. July 21, 1978.
- Pietro Montana, 1890 – 1978, National Academy Museum and School, New York City.
- Cal Snyder, Out of Fire and Valor: The War Memorials of New York City, (Bunker Hill Publishing, 2005). ISBN 1-59-373051-9
- Jennifer Wingate, Sculpting Doughboys: Memory, Gender and Taste in America's World War I Memorials, (Ashgate Publishing, Ltd., 2013). ISBN 1-40-940655-5
