= Humilis of Bisignano =

Christian saint

Saint Humilis of Bisignano O.F.M.
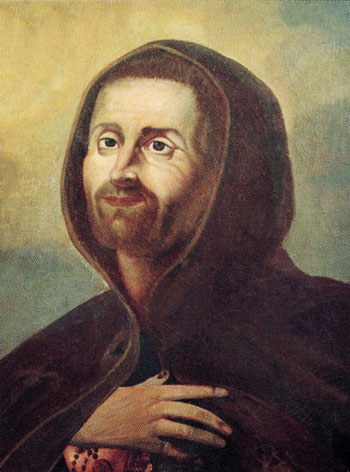

Religious
- Born: Luca Antonio Pirozzo; 26 August 1582; Bisignano, Principality of Bisignano, Calabria
- Died: 26 November 1637; Bisignano, Principality of Bisignano, Calabria
- Venerated in: Roman Catholic Church (Archdiocese of Cosenza-Bisignano & Franciscan Order)
- Beatified: 29 January 1882, Rome, Kingdom of Italy, by Pope Leo XIII
- Canonized: 19 May 2002, Vatican City, by Pope John Paul II
- Major shrine: Convento di Riforma, Bisignano, Cosenza, Italy
- Feast: 27 November

Humilis of Bisignano (Italian: Umile da Bisignano) (1582 – 26 November 1637) was a Franciscan friar who was widely known in his day as a mystic and wonderworker. He has been declared a saint by the Catholic Church.

== Life ==
He was born Luca Antonio Pirozzo in 1582 in the city of Bisignano in the region of Calabria, the son of Giovanni Pirozzo and Ginevra Giardino. He grew up a very religious child and was known to be often at prayer, attending Mass daily and receiving Holy Communion as often as was permitted, a rare practice during that era. He was noted during his youth as an exemplar of humility, in keeping with the religious name he later adopted, as a result of his literally turning his cheek after being brutally slapped in the face in the city square.

About the age of 18, Pirozzo felt called to enter a religious order, but, for various reasons, did not do so until 1609. In that year, aged 27, he felt called to enter the Reformed Friars Minor, a branch of the Order following a more severe way of life, who had a community at the medieval Convento di Riforma (Friary of the Reform) in his city. He was admitted that same year as a lay brother into the novitiate of those friars which was located at Mesoraca in the Province of Crotone, at which time he received the religious habit and was given the name by which he is known. After overcoming various difficulties during that year of probation, he was allowed to profess religious vows as a full member of the Order on 4 September 1610.

Humilis had been known to experience religious ecstasy since his childhood. After his admission to the Friars Minor, he was assigned the various domestic tasks entrusted to the lay brothers among the friars. His superiors in the Order also repeatedly subjected him to many tasks and challenges to determine his character and the validity of these supernatural experiences. Although illiterate, he was found able to explain clearly some of the deepest doctrines of the Catholic faith to officials of the church, even the Inquisitor of the kingdom.

Known for his gentleness and innocence of mind, Humilis came to earn the great respect of his fellow friars. He was chosen by Benigno de Genova, the Minister General of the Friars Minor (1618–1625), to be his companion for his canonical visitation to the friars of southern Italy and Sicily. After this, Humilis was summoned to Rome, where he served as a respected adviser to Pope Gregory XV as well as Pope Urban VIII. During this period, he lived primarily at the Friary of San Francesco a Ripa.

Humilis returned to his native city many years later, where he died in 1637. He was interred in the cemetery of the friars at the friary in his native city.

== Veneration ==
The cause for Humilis' canonization was begun in the mid-17th century, and he was declared venerable by Pope Pius VI in 1780. He was beatified on 29 January 1882 by Pope Leo XIII, and the cause for his canonization was formally opened on 13 January 1887. He was declared a saint by Pope John Paul II in 2002.
