= Ernsting =

Ernsting is a German surname. Notable people with the surname include:

- John Ernsting (1928–2009), British Royal Air Force commander
- Walter Ernsting (1920–2005), German writer

== See also ==
- Nadine Ernsting-Krienke (born 1974), German field hockey player
- 15265 Ernsting, a main-belt asteroid
