= Bisignano =

Italian town and comune

Bisignano Griko: Besidía
- Comune
- Comune di Bisignano
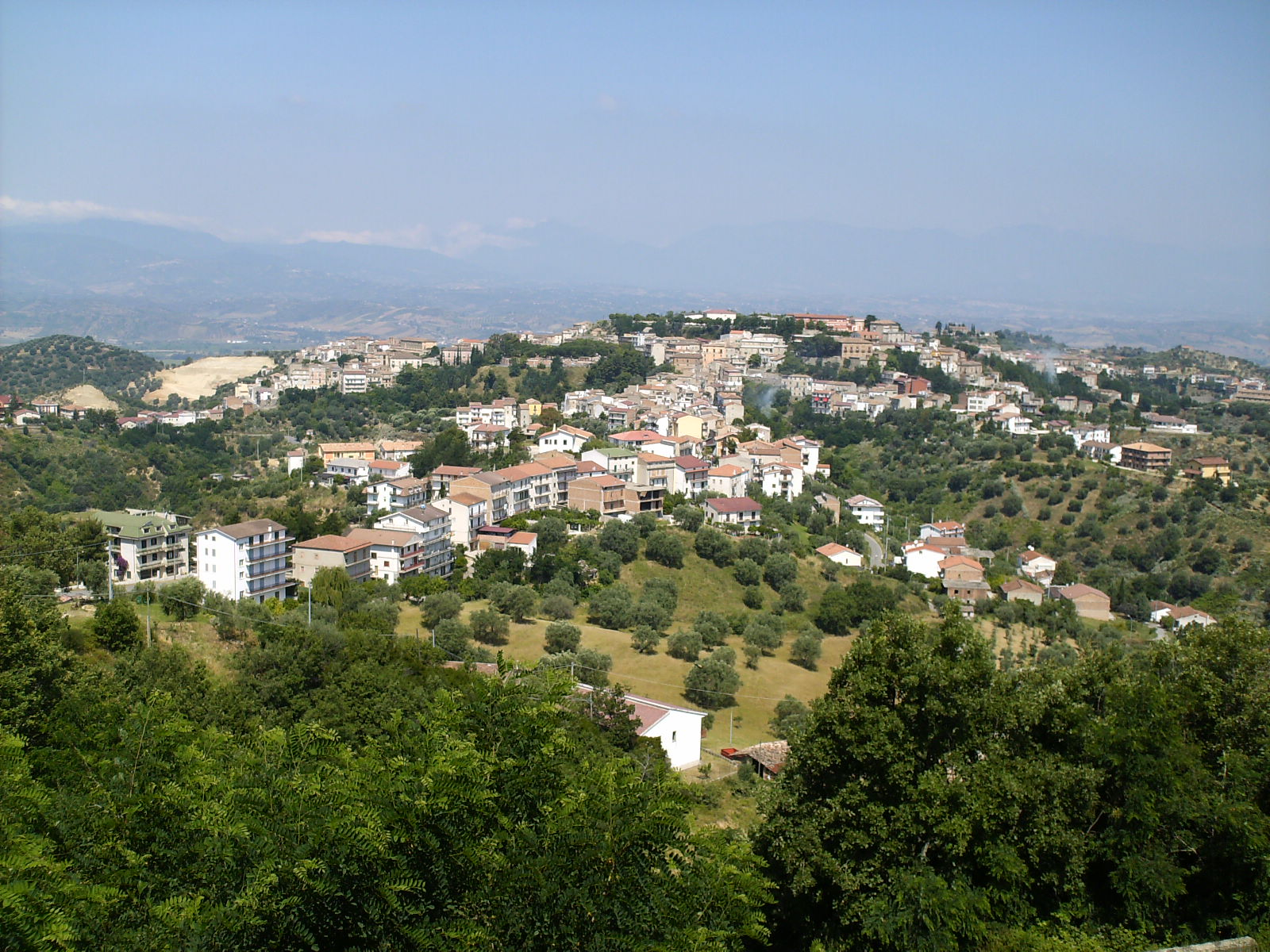

- Coat of arms

- Location within Italy Location within Calabria
- Coordinates: 39°31′N 16°17′E
- Country: Italy
- Region: Calabria
- Province: Cosenza (CS)

Government
  - Mayor: Francesco Fucile

Area
  - Total: 86.2 km^{2} (33.3 sq mi)
- Elevation: 350 m (1,150 ft)

Population (31 May 2021)
  - Total: 9,787
  - Density: 114/km^{2} (294/sq mi)
- Demonym: Bisignanesi
- Time zone: UTC+1 (CET)
  - Summer (DST): UTC+2 (CEST)
- Postal code: 87043
- Dialing code: 0984
- Patron saint: Saint Francis of Paola
- Saint day: 2 April
- Website: Official website

Bisignano (Calabrian: Visignànu) is a town and comune in the province of Cosenza, part of the Calabria region of southern Italy. It is situated on hills in the Crati valley, between the Pollino and Sila National Parks. The town has historically been settled and inhabited by an Arbëreshë community.

== History ==
Bisignano is identified with the ancient town of Besidiae, recorded by Livy, and was subsequently known as Besidianum and Bisidianum. The archaeological remains found there date the settlement back to the 15th or 14th century BC.

In 1054 Bisignano was a free city. It became the residence of a Norman count and later a fief of the Orsini family. In 1641 it became a fief of the Sanseverino family, which it remained until 1806.

According to Henry Yule, Giovanni de Marignolli, famous for his accounts of travels in China, was made bishop of Bisignano in 1354. "The bishop, however, seems to have been in no hurry to reside there; thinking perhaps that a man who had spent so many years of his life in travelling to Cathay and back might be excused from passing the whole of those that remained to him in the wilds of Calabria."

In 1467, the daughter of the Albanian leader Skanderbeg, who was the wife of the Prince of Bisignano, invited many Albanian families to this region, and they established various colonies, where they spoke their own language and used the Greek Rite. Skanderbeg had previously helped King Ferdinand I of Naples to end a French-supported insurrection and had been rewarded with the grant of land in Apulia. An alternative version maintains that it was Skanderbeg's great-granddaughter Erina Castriota, Duchess of San Pietro di Galatina and wife of Pietro Antonio Sanseverino, Prince of Bisignano, who invited Albanians to settle in the area. This was one of the origins of Calabria's Italo-Albanian Arbëreshë community.

Luca Antonio Pirozzo, better known as St. Humilis of Bisignano (1582–1637), was a Franciscan friar born in Bisignano.

== Main sights ==
- Riforma Convent (founded in 1222), containing a wooden Crucifixion sculpted by Frate Umile da Petralia (1637), a statue of the Madonna of the Graces in marble attributed to the school of Domenico Gagini and a painting of Saint Daniel attributed to Luca Giordano.
- Palazzo Gallo, built in the early 17th century, notable for its wrought ironwork.
- Church of San Domenico, former convent founded in 1475, destroyed in the 1887 earthquake and rebuilt in the [Romanesque]-[Gothic] style.
- Palazzo Sanseverino, residence of the princely Sanseverino family.
- Cathedral: destroyed in the earthquake and rebuilt, retains the arch of the Gothic door and a Gothic portal.
- Museo del Cavallo (Museum of the Horse) designed by Marcello Guido is an example of the deconstructivist school of modern architecture

== Economy ==
Apart from the famous string instruments and pottery handicraft traditions, the main area of activity is agriculture. "At Bisignano they make the earth sparkle and wood play". Agriculture has prospered in the fertile valleys of the area. The town and the other four municipalities of the Calabrian district specialise in the cultivation and production of cereals, pasta, vegetables, fruit (citrons, bergamot oranges, oranges, clementine tangerines, lemons, grapefruit), savoury goat and sheep's milk cheeses (Caciocavallo silano in particular), hot red peppers, fine extra-virgin olive oil of medium-high quality (various types: slightly fruity, aromatised, organic and the more famous Bruzio DOP), robust and delicate wines (Donnici in particular) and sweets.

The growing of olives destined to make DOP olive oil is important in the Crati valley. Greenhouse farming, holiday farms and the breeding of thoroughbred horses are also major activities.

== Gastronomy ==
The local gastronomic specialities include dishes like coccìa, made with boiled wheat and emmer, macaroni with meat sauce, capocollo steccato, made with the top part of pork loin and Christmas sweets such as imbigliulati (a mixture of honey, figs, nuts, raisins and almonds) fried pasta reale with honey and vissinielli (leavened batter with pieces of anchovy or fried sardines).
