= Marcello Guido =

Italian deconstructivist architect (born 1953)

Marcello Guido (born 1 January 1953) is an Italian deconstructivist architect.

Born in Acri, he is based in Cosenza, Calabria. He trained as an architect at the Faculty of Architecture of La Sapienza University, Rome. He is a student of Bruno Zevi. He is president of the Istituto Nazionale di Architettura (InArch) Calabria section and a member of the Istituto's Administrative Board.

He is regarded as an authority on the integration of contemporary architecture in the setting of Italy's historic city centres. His "forceful and courageous" Piazza Toscana archaeological site project in Cosenza was awarded the Dedalo Minosse Prize (Dedalo Minosse International Prize for Italian Architecture) Special Prize in 2002. The dynamism of its conceptualisation has been favourably compared with that of the corkscrew lantern on the dome of Borromini's Sant'Ivo alla Sapienza.

His work, representative of the deconstructivist style of architecture in Italy, is the subject of Cesare De Sessa 's monograph "Marcello Guido, L'impegno nella trasgressione" ("Marcello Guido, Commitment in Transgression").

== Work ==
- Museum of the Horse (Museo del cavallo), Bisignano, Calabria
- Piazza Toscano, archaeological site covering, Cosenza, Calabria
- Social Centre, San Giorgio Albanese, Calabria, Italy
- Service Centre "Park Crista", Acri, Calabria, Cosenza
- Pavilion, San Giorgio Albanese, Calabria, Cosenza
- Tourist Centre, Pescolanciano, Molise, Isernia
- Apartment Building, Cosenza, Calabria
- and other projects.
