= Astorino =

Astorino is an Italian surname. Notable people with the surname include:

- Louis D. Astorino (born 1948), Pittsburgh architect
- Rob Astorino (born 1967), New York politician
