= Charles Atlas =

Italian-born American bodybuilder (1892–1972)

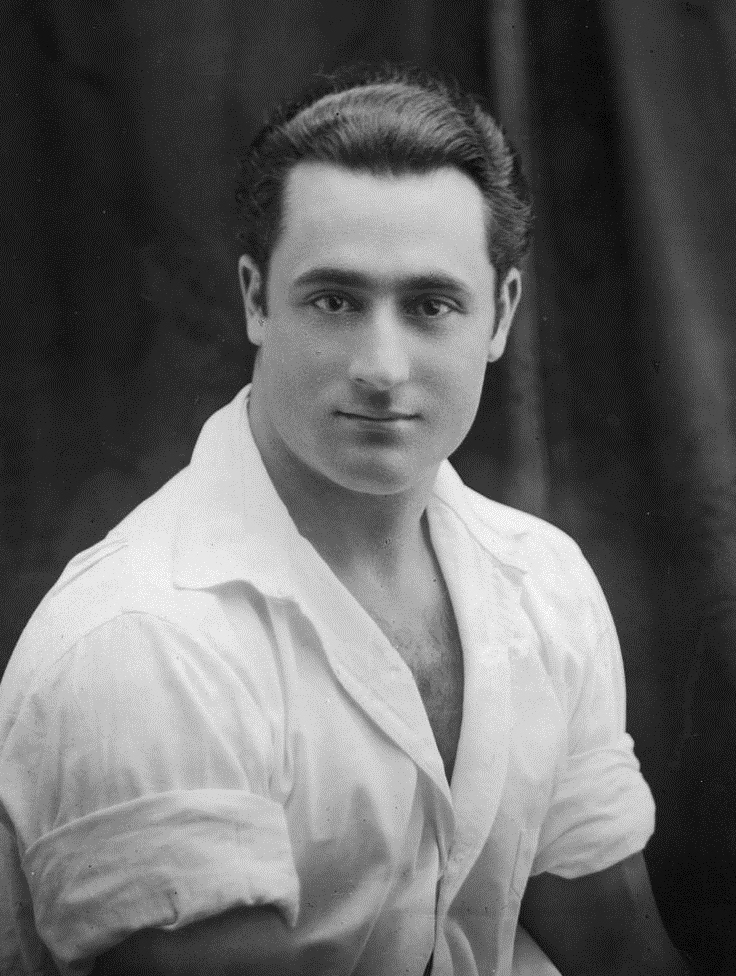
- Atlas c. 1920
- Born: Angelo Siciliano; October 30, 1892; Acri, Province of Cosenza, Italy
- Died: December 24, 1972 (aged 80); Long Beach, New York, U.S.
- Occupation: Bodybuilder
- Spouse: Margaret Cassano (m. 1918)
- Children: 2

Charles Atlas (born Angelo Siciliano; October 30, 1892 – December 24, 1972) was an Italian-born American bodybuilder best remembered as the developer of a bodybuilding method and its associated exercise program which spawned a landmark advertising campaign featuring his name and likeness; it has been described as one of the longest-lasting and most memorable ad campaigns of all time.

Atlas trained himself to develop his body from that of a "scrawny weakling", eventually becoming the most popular bodybuilder of his day. He took the name "Charles Atlas" after a friend told him that he resembled the statue of Atlas on top of a hotel in Coney Island and legally changed his name in 1922. He marketed his first bodybuilding course with health and fitness writer Frederick Tilney in November 1922. The duo ran the company out of Tilney's home for the first six months. In 1929, Tilney sold his half of the business to advertising man Charles P. Roman and moved to Florida. Charles Atlas Ltd. was founded in 1929 and, as of 2023, continues to market a fitness program for the "97-pound (44 kg) weakling". The company is now owned by Jeffrey C. Hogue.

== History ==
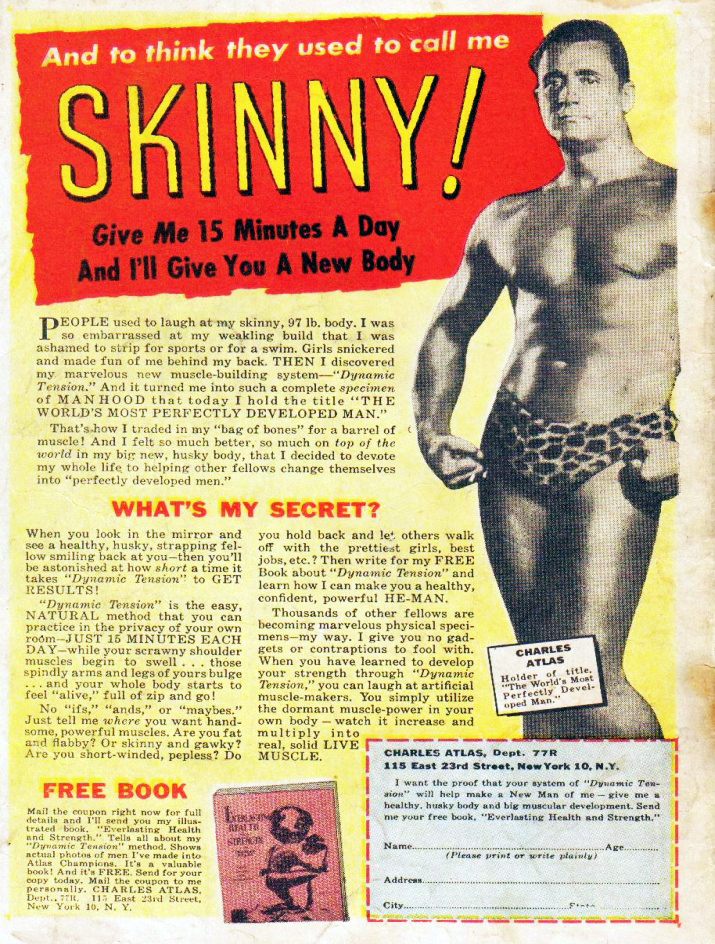
Comic book ad from 1949 featuring Atlas

Angelo Siciliano was born in Acri, Cosenza, on October 30, 1892. Angelino, as he was also called, moved to Brooklyn, New York, in 1904, and eventually became a leather worker. He tried many forms of exercise initially, using weights, pulley-style resistance, and gymnastic-style calisthenics. Atlas claimed that they did not build his body. He was inspired by other fitness and health advocates who preceded him, including world-renowned strongman Eugen Sandow and Bernarr MacFadden (a major proponent of "physical culture"). He was too poor to join the local YMCA, so he watched how exercises were performed, then performed them at home. He attended the strongman shows at Coney Island, and would question the strongmen about their diets and exercise regimens after the show. He would read Physical Culture magazine for further information on health, strength, and physical development, and finally developed his own system of exercises that was later called "Dynamic Tension", a phrase coined by Charles Roman.

A bully kicked sand into Siciliano's face at a beach when he was a youth, according to the story that he always told. At this time in his life, also according to the story, he weighed only 97 pounds (44 kg). According to several stories and claims, he was at the zoo watching a lion stretch when he thought to himself, "Does this old gentleman have any barbells, any exercisers? ... And it came over me. ... He's been pitting one muscle against another!" None of the exercises in the Dynamic Tension course could be attributed to how lions use their bodies. Other exercise courses of the time contained exercises similar to Atlas's course, particularly those marketed by Bernarr Macfadden and Earle E. Liederman.

Macfadden, publisher of the magazine Physical Culture, dubbed Siciliano "America's Most Handsome Man" in 1921, and "America's Most Perfectly Developed Man" in a 1922 contest held in Madison Square Garden. He soon took the role of strongman in the Coney Island circus side show. Atlas never actually won a title anywhere proclaiming him to be the "world's most perfectly developed man".

In 1922, 30-year-old Siciliano officially changed his name to "Charles Atlas" as it sounded much more American. He met Frederick Tilney, a British homeopathic physician and course writer who was employed as publisher Bernarr MacFadden's "ideas man". Atlas and Tilney met through MacFadden, who was using Atlas as a model for a short movie titled The Road to Health. Atlas wrote a fitness course and then asked Tilney to edit it. Tilney agreed and Atlas went into business in 1922.

== Dynamic Tension program ==
Atlas's "Dynamic Tension" program consists of twelve lessons and one final perpetual lesson. Each lesson is supplemented with photographs of Atlas demonstrating the exercises. Atlas's lesson booklets added commentary that referred to the readers as his friends and gave them an open invitation to write him letters to update him on their progress and stories. Among the people who took Atlas's course were Max Baer, heavyweight boxing champion from 1934 to 1935; Rocky Marciano, heavyweight boxing champion from 1952 to 1956; Joe Louis, heavyweight boxing champion from 1937 to 1949; British heavyweight weightlifting champion and Darth Vader actor David Prowse; and Allan Wells, the 1980 Moscow Olympic Games 100 meter champion.

== Artists' model ==
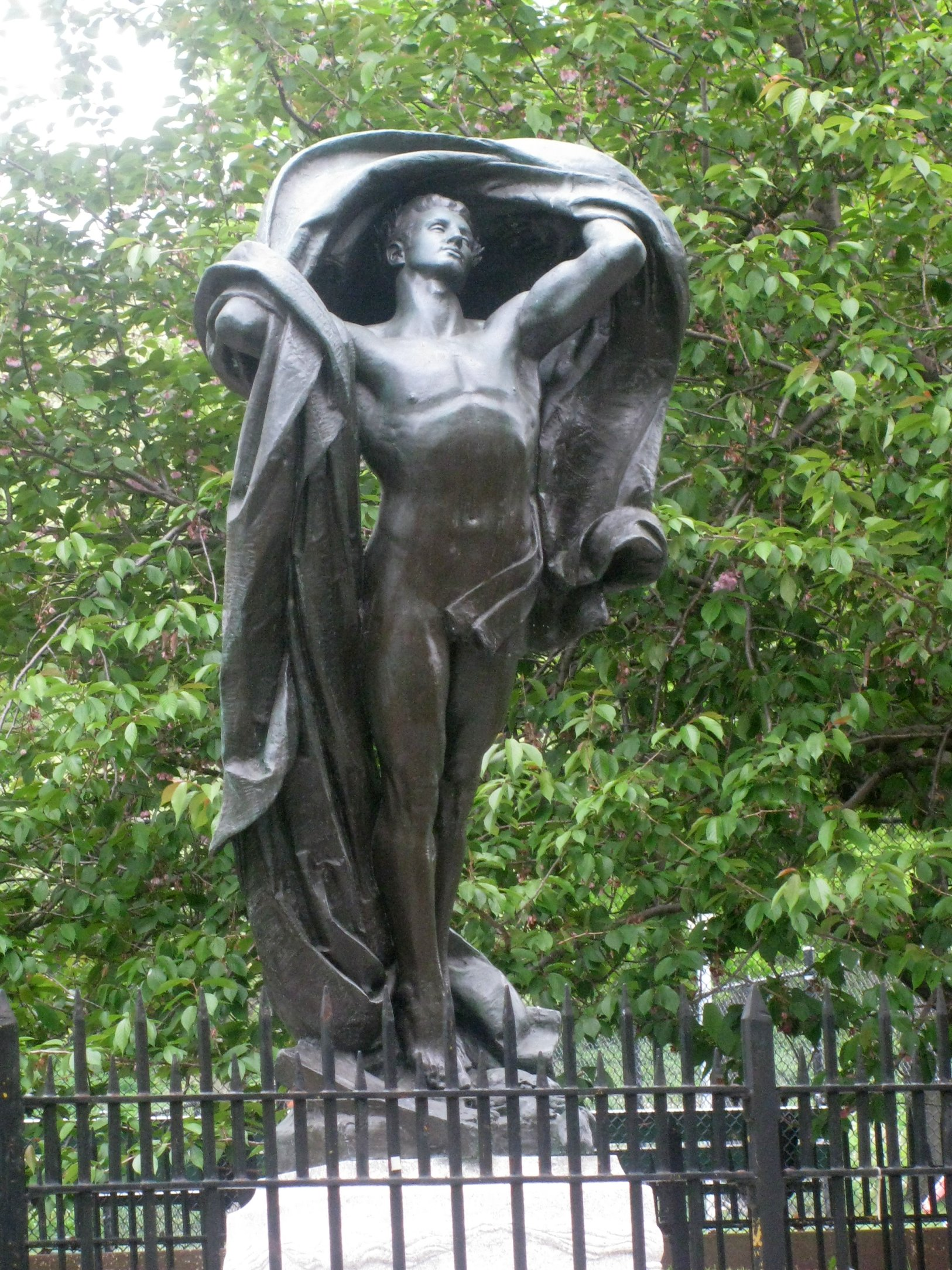
The Dawn of Glory (1924) by Pietro Montana, Highland Park, Brooklyn

Besides photographs, Atlas posed for many statues throughout his life. These included Alexander Stirling Calder's Washington at Peace (1917–18) on the Washington Square Arch, Manhattan; Pietro Montana's Dawn of Glory (1924) in Highland Park, Brooklyn (sometimes misreported as Prospect Park); and James Earle Fraser's Alexander Hamilton (1923) at the U.S. Treasury Building in Washington, D.C.

== Death ==
Atlas began to experience chest pains after exercising during his final years, resulting in his hospitalization in December 1972. He died from a heart attack in the hospital on December 24, 1972, in Long Beach, New York at age 80.

== Print advertisements ==
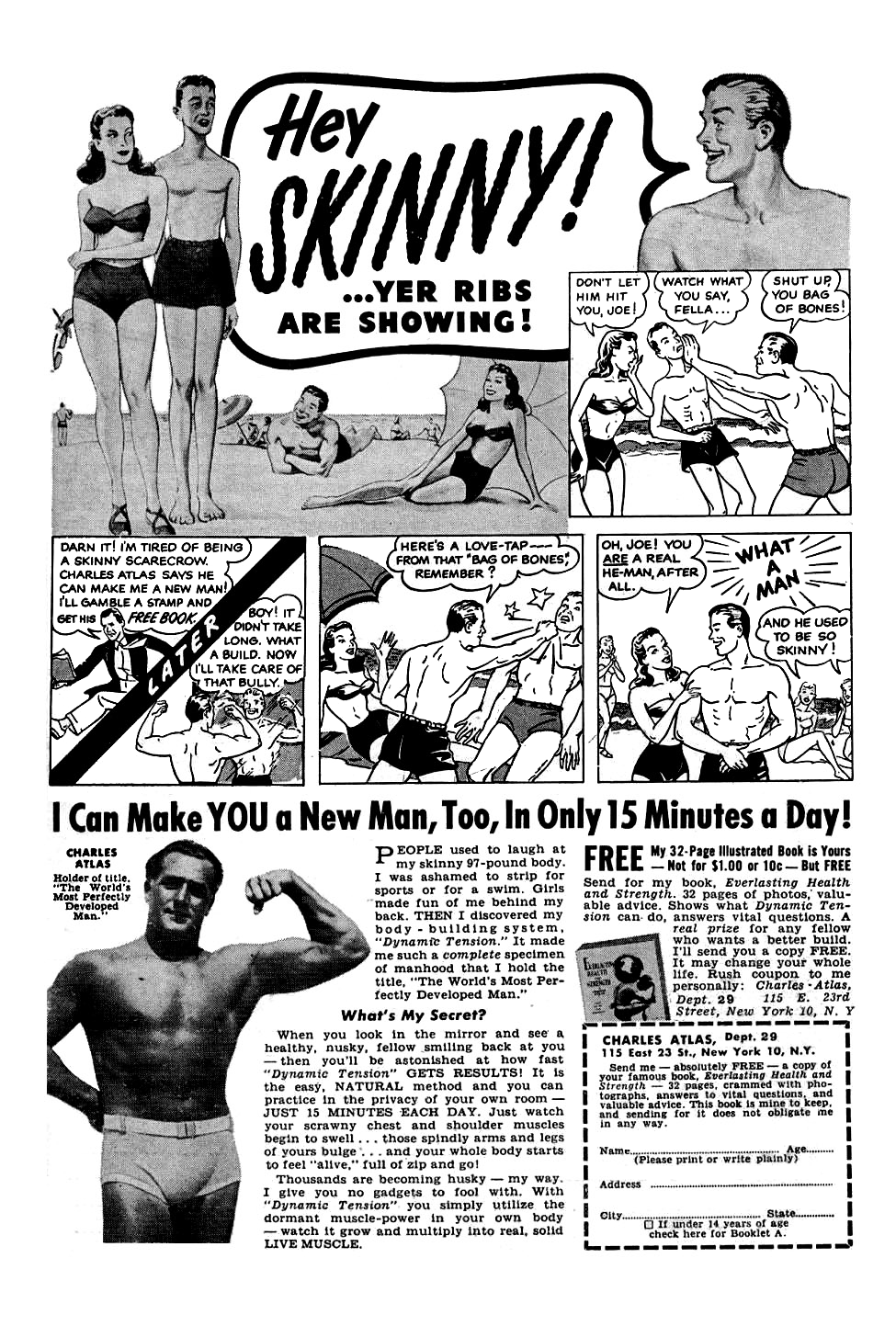
1953 variant of the famous "Beach Bully" advertisement.

The famous Charles Atlas print advertisements became iconic mostly because they were printed in cartoon form from the 1930s on, and in many comic books from the 1940s onwards – in fact continuing long after Atlas's death. The typical scenario, usually expressed in comic strip form, presented a skinny young man (usually accompanied by a female companion) being threatened by a bully. The bully pushes down the "97-pound weakling" and the girlfriend joins in the derision. The young man goes home, gets angry (usually demonstrated by his kicking a chair), and sends away for the free Atlas book. Shortly thereafter, the newly muscled hero returns to the place of his original victimization, seeks out the bully, and beats him up. He is rewarded by the swift return of his girlfriend and the admiration of onlookers.

The ad was said to be based on an experience the real Atlas had as a boy. With variations, it was a mainstay of comic books and boys' magazines for decades. The ads usually conclude with the words "As is true of all the exercises in Atlas's course, you can do these exercises almost anywhere."

Charles Atlas slogans used in advertising copyrighted in 1932 included "Battle Fought in Bed that made Fred a He-Man!", "Insult that Made a Man out of Mac", and "Let Me Give You a Body that Men Respect and Women Admire!". Slogans copyrighted the following year included "97 pound weakling... Who became the World's Most Perfectly Developed Man", and "Just Seven Days that's All I Need".

=== "The Insult that Made a Man out of Mac" ===
In this, the full-length version, the protagonist, "Mac", is accosted on the beach by a sand-kicking bully while his date watches. Humiliated, the young man goes home and, after kicking a chair and gambling a three-cent stamp, subscribes to Atlas's "Dynamic-Tension" program. Later, the now muscular protagonist goes back to the beach and beats up the bully, becoming the "hero of the beach". His girl returns while other women marvel at how big his muscles are. (An earlier but otherwise almost identical version, "How Joe's Body Brought Him Fame Instead of Shame", debuted in the 1940s.)

=== "The Insult That Turned a 'Chump' Into a Champ" ===
In this version, which debuted in 1941, "Joe" is at a fair with his girl when the bully (who has just shown his strength with the "Ring-the-Bell" game) insults and pushes him. Joe goes home, slams his fist on the table, and orders the free Atlas book. Joe then returns to the fair, rings the bell, and pushes down the bully while his girlfriend reappears to compliment him on his new, powerful physique.

=== "Hey, Skinny! Yer Ribs Are Showing!" ===
The condensed, four-panel version stars "Joe", though it is otherwise identical to Mac's story. Instead of "Hero of the beach", the words floating above Joe's head are "What a man!"

=== "How Jack the Weakling Slaughtered the Dance-Floor Hog" ===
Another version of the ad presents a scenario in which "Jack" is dancing with his girlfriend, Helen. They are bumped into by a bully, who comments on how puny Jack is, not even worth beating up. Jack goes home, kicks a chair, and sends away for Atlas's "free book". Later, the muscular Jack finds the bully, punches him, and wins back the admiration of Helen. This time, the words "Hit of the party" float over his head as he basks in the admiration of the other dancers.
