= San Lorenzo Bellizzi =

- Comune
- Comune di San Lorenzo Bellizzi
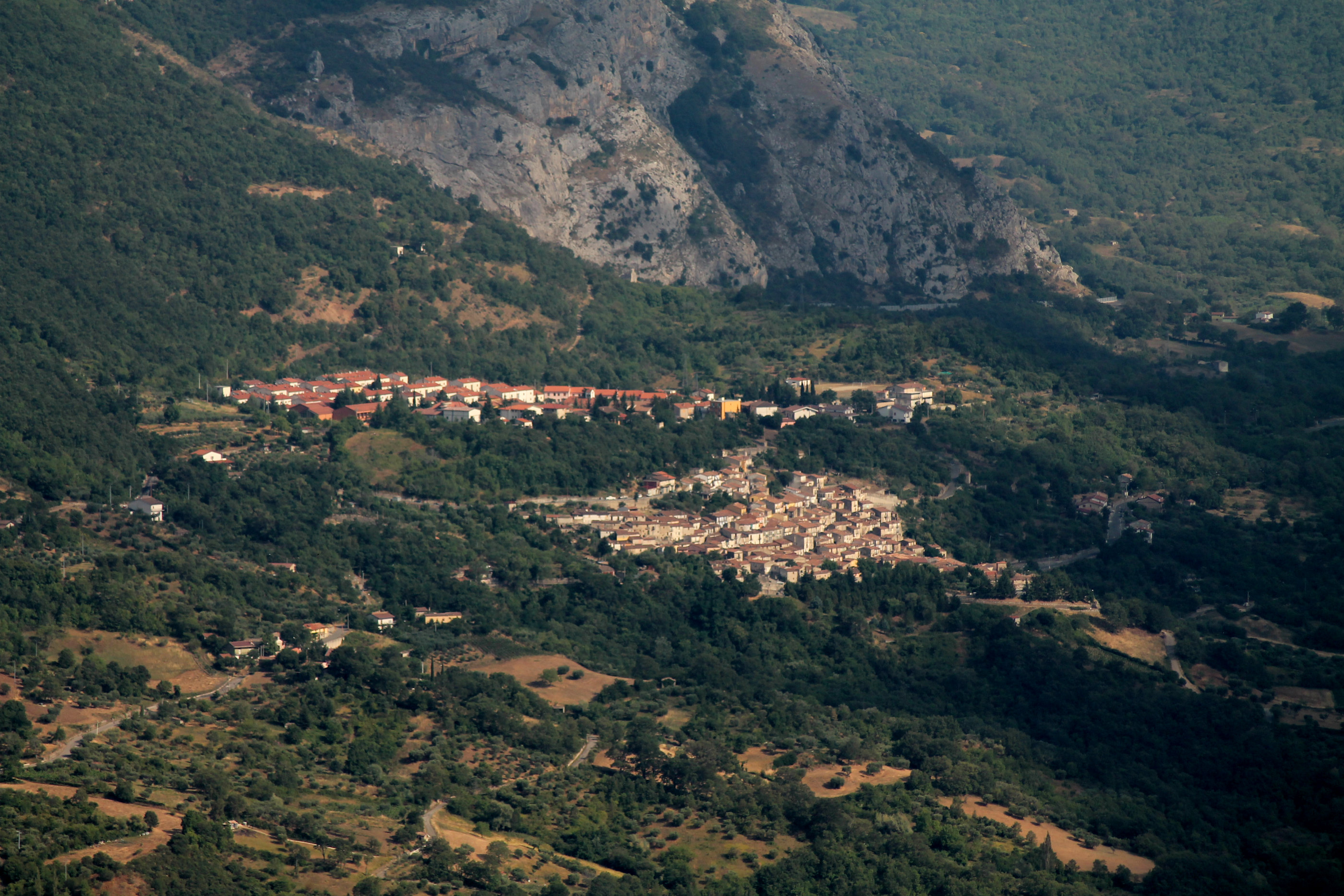

- Coat of arms

- Location within Italy Location within Calabria
- Coordinates: 39°53′N 16°20′E
- Country: Italy
- Region: Calabria
- Province: Cosenza (CS)

Government
  - Mayor: Antonio Cersosimo

Area
  - Total: 38 km^{2} (15 sq mi)
- Elevation: 830 m (2,720 ft)

Population (31 July 2018)
  - Total: 599
  - Density: 16/km^{2} (41/sq mi)
- Demonym: Sallorenzani
- Time zone: UTC+1 (CET)
  - Summer (DST): UTC+2 (CEST)
- Postal code: 87070
- Dialing code: 0981
- Patron saint: Saint Lawrence
- Saint day: 10 August
- Website: Official website

San Lorenzo Bellizzi is a village and comune in the province of Cosenza in the Calabria region of southern Italy.

Situated in the Pollino National Park, the village is bordered by Castrovillari, Cerchiara di Calabria, Civita and Terranova di Pollino. Its economy is mostly based on agriculture, animal husbandry and traditional craftsmanship.
