= Santa Domenica Talao =

- Comune
- Comune di Santa Domenica Talao
- Coat of arms

- Location within Calabria Location within Italy
- Country: Italy
- Region: Calabria
- Province: Cosenza

Government
  - Mayor: Alfredo Giuseppe Lucchesi
- Elevation: 304 m (997 ft)

Population (2024)
  - Total: 1,122
- Demonym: Santadomenicani
- Time zone: UTC+1 (CET)
  - Summer (DST): UTC+2 (CEST)

Santa Domenica Talao is a village and comune in the province of Cosenza, Calabria, southern Italy, with a population of 1,122 (2024).

The toponym Talao refers to the nearby Lao river, cited in classical sources as Λάος (Laos). According to some toponymic hypotheses, the term may derive from a contraction of the Greek expression κατά Λάος (katà Lâos), meaning “near/towards the Lao”, later evolving into Talao. In later erudite traditions the variant Θαλάος (Thaláos) is also attested, probably due to textual corruption or association with θάλασσα (“sea”).

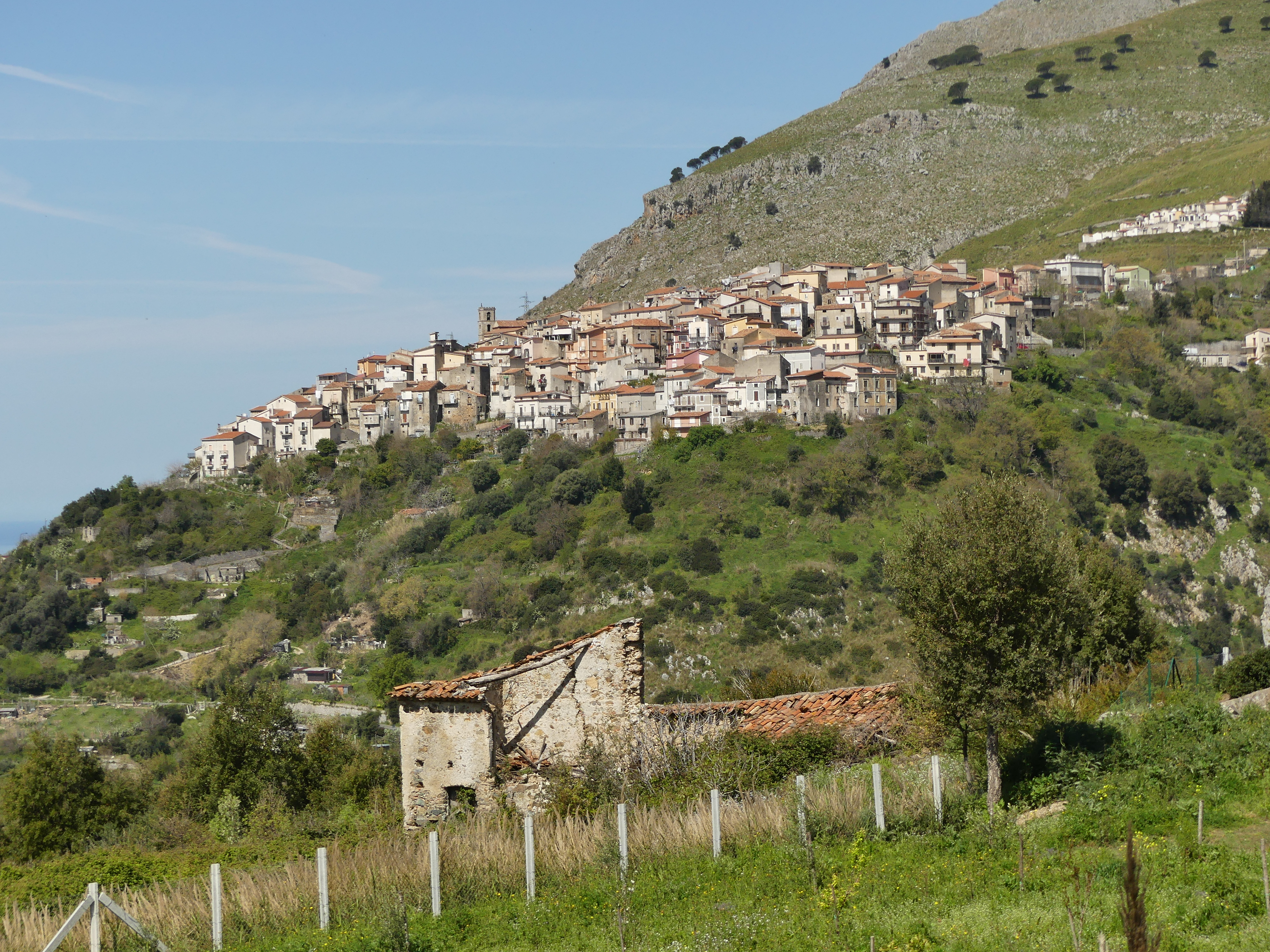
View of Santa Domenica Talao

== Geography ==
The village stands at 304 metres above sea level on a hillside at the foot of the Serra La Limpida, a massif rising over 1,000 metres. The municipal territory stretches from the hilly belt to the mountain ranges that mark the border with the municipalities of Orsomarso and Papasidero. From the village there is a wide view over the lower Lao valley, ranging from the Orsomarso mountains to the Riviera dei Cedri, from Capo Cirella to Scalea, along the Tyrrhenian coast. A significant part of the territory lies within the Pollino National Park, which protects forests, wildlife and the characteristic natural landscapes of northern Calabria.

=== Borders ===
The municipality borders Orsomarso (south-east), Papasidero (north-east), Scalea (west), and San Nicola Arcella and Praia a Mare (north-west).

=== Geology and morphology ===
The area ranges from Mesozoic limestone and dolomite hills to ridges exceeding 1,000 m on the Tyrrhenian side of the Pollino, featuring karst landforms, gorges and sinkholes.

=== Vegetation and fauna ===
Vegetation includes Mediterranean scrub and olive groves at lower elevations, chestnut and oak woods on the hills, and mixed beech–silver fir stands at higher altitudes. Protected fauna in the Pollino National Park include roe deer, the Apennine wolf, golden eagle and several raptors.

=== Climate ===
The climate is Mediterranean in the lower and hilly areas (hot, dry summers; mild winters), becoming cooler and more continental in the interior and mountain zones, where winter snowfall is not uncommon.

== History ==
The name Santa Domenica is recorded in 1563 in a list of towns and lands of the Kingdom of Naples, indicating an early toponymic attestation, though a structured settlement is not certain at that date. The organised community dates to the first half of the 17th century, when the princes of Scalea promoted colonisation of lands near the Lao. In the 1620s families from Mormanno and surrounding villages were settled with incentives; by 1651 the casale of Santa Domenica counted about sixty hearths. The village became a parish (1662) and later a feudal Università; population grew through arrivals from Orsomarso, Papasidero, Lauria and elsewhere, with an economy based on grain, vines, figs and, later, olives. The 18th century brought demographic expansion, new chapels and noble palaces, while the 1799 upheavals divided locals between supporters of the Parthenopean Republic and Bourbon loyalists. After Italian unification, Santa Domenica became an autonomous municipality; in 1864 the official name was changed to Santa Domenica Talao to distinguish it from homonymous places, referencing the Lao river.

In the 20th century the town underwent strong emigration. Besides North America and Argentina, many settled in the Dominican Republic (notably Puerto Plata, Santiago and La Vega), founding businesses and associations such as the Pro-Santa Domenica Talao Society (1917). In 2022 a twinning with Santo Domingo was formalised, recognising the historic contribution of Santadomenicani emigrants and strengthening cultural ties.

== Symbols ==
The coat of arms shows a vine branch with a ripe grape cluster entwined around an olive tree, on a silver shield with a blue border.

== Main sights ==
- Mother Church of Saint Joseph. Late 17th-century church, enlarged in 1701 (transept and apse). Notable Baroque stuccoes, polychrome marble high altar (1774), choir and a Holy Family canvas of the Neapolitan school. Human burials (pre-1837) were found during early-2000s works and displayed in a small crypt.
- Chapel of Our Lady of the Rosary. Built in 1725 (single nave); focal point of the October fair known as Fera ’u Chianu held in the lower part of town (“Piano”).
- Chapel of Saint John the Evangelist. Small 18th-century chapel in the upper quarter (’A Codda), erected by Don Giovanni Longo; recently fully restored thanks to donations from the faithful.
- Piazza Italia. Main square by the Mother Church, with an ancient olive tree, expanded in the 1920s–30s thanks to emigrants in the Dominican Republic; wide views over the Lao valley and Tyrrhenian coast.
- Noble palaces. Palazzo Campagna (1774), Palazzo Perrone (Senise), Palazzo Schiffino (birthplace of Jesuit philosopher Santo Schiffini, 1841–1906), Palazzo La Greca, Palazzo Longo.
- Museum of the Earth. Local museum on agricultural life, tools, maps and documents; it also houses the Pro Loco association.

== Demographic evolution ==
Population according to the Italian National Institute of Statistics (ISTAT).

Population of Santa Domenica Talao
Year	Population
1861	2890
1871	2801
1881	2499
1901	2199
1911	1890
1921	2066
1931	1841
1936	2139
1951	2139
1961	1691
1971	1451
1981	1419
1991	1378
2001	1314
2011	1272
2021	1140
2024	1122

In recent years the village has attracted foreign residents—especially English-speaking—who have bought and restored houses in the historic centre and rural hamlets, contributing to the recovery of the built heritage.

== Festivals ==
San Giuseppe all’Accovata (first Sunday of May): procession to the St Joseph chapel in the Accovata hamlet, with a traditional fair.

Patronal feast of St Joseph (Fera ’a Codda, traditional fair held in the upper part of the village) (first Sunday after 20 July): week-long religious observances, solemn procession, and a historic fair/market in the upper quarter ’A Codda (Viale Roma).

Estate Santadomenicana (August): summer programme of music, entertainment and food events; known in the 1990s as E...state in terrazzo.

International Tyrrhenian Jazz Festival: jazz concerts and events, often hosted in the gardens of Palazzo Campagna.

Feast of Our Lady of the Rosary (Fera ’u Chianu, traditional fair in the lower part of the village) (first Sunday of October): fair in the lower town (“Piano”), historically with livestock trading and produce (notably walnuts), with a procession from the parish church.

== Economy ==
Santa Domenica Talao’s economy is based on small-scale activities typical of rural Calabria. Agriculture remains significant (olive oil, vines, cereals, vegetables and fruit, often for local consumption); livestock farming survives in small family holdings. Tourism—especially summer, rural and second-home tourism—has grown, linked to the Riviera dei Cedri and Pollino National Park. Despite these resources, the town shares challenges common to inland areas: depopulation and ageing have reduced the labour force and local demand, and employment opportunities are limited; many residents work in services or commute to nearby coastal centres such as Scalea.

== Transport ==
=== Roads ===
The town is connected to the Strada Statale 18 via the provincial road SP3 from Scalea.

- From the north: A2 Salerno–Reggio Calabria exit at Lagonegro Nord towards Praia a Mare, then SS 18 south to the San Nicola Arcella–Santa Domenica Talao exit, and follow signs for ~8 km; alternatively, exit at Mormanno and take SP3 (33 km) towards Scalea.
- From the south: A2 exit Falerna, then SS 18 to Scalea and SP3 to km 7.9; alternatively, exit Mormanno and take SP3 (33 km) towards Scalea.

=== Rail ===
The nearest station is Scalea-Santa Domenica Talao railway station, about 8 km away, on the Tyrrhenian main line. It is served by regional and InterCity services, and by some high-speed services (Frecciarossa and Italo) with direct connections to Turin, Milan, Rome and Naples.

=== Airports ===
Nearest airports: Lamezia Terme International Airport (approx. 127 km); Salerno–Costa d’Amalfi Airport (approx. 161 km); Naples–Capodichino Airport (approx. 232 km).

== Administration ==
Since the Second World War, the following mayors (sindaci) have governed Santa Domenica Talao:

Name	Term of office	Party/affiliation	Notes
Francesco Oliva	March 1946 – November 1960	Civic list Il Peso	
Tommaso Riccardi	November 1960 – June 1970	Christian Democracy	
Giuseppe Carriero	June 1970 – December 1971	Civic list La Spiga	
Francesco Campagna	January 1972 – December 1978	Civic list La Spiga	
Italo Paolino	December 1978 – May 1979	Civic list La Spiga	
Pasquale Di Giorgio	May 1979 – December 1988	Civic list La Spiga	
Antonio Oliva	January 1989 – September 1989	Civic list	
Commissario prefettizio	16 October 1989 – 6 May 1990	–	Special commissioner appointed by the Prefecture
Giuseppe Antonio La Greca	6 May 1990 – 13 June 1999	MSI – Alleanza Nazionale	
Angelo Salvatore Paolino	13 June 1999 – 8 June 2009	Civic list Rinascita democratica	
Alfredo Giuseppe Lucchesi	8 June 2009 – present	Civic list Rinascita democratica	Re-elected in 2024

== Twin towns ==
- Castelnuovo Scrivia, Italy (since 1997)
- Santo Domingo, Dominican Republic (since 2022)

== See also ==
- Scalea-Santa Domenica Talao railway station
