= List of twin towns and sister cities in Kosovo =

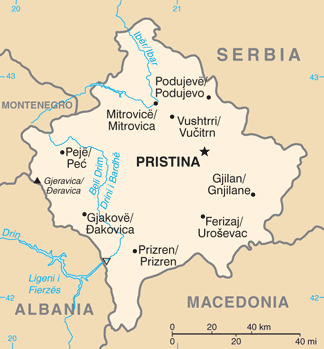
Map of Kosovo

This is a list of municipalities in Kosovo which have standing links to local communities in other countries known as "town twinning" (usually in Europe) or "sister cities" (usually in the rest of the world).

== D ==
Deçan

- Plav, Montenegro
- Ulcinj, Montenegro

Dragash

- Orhaneli, Turkey
- Sapanca, Turkey

Drenas

- Karaisalı, Turkey

== F ==
Ferizaj

- Cedar Falls, United States
- Karacabey, Turkey

== G ==
Gjakova

- Fort Dodge, United States
- Lodève, France
- Sarandë, Albania

Gjilan

- Kumanovo, North Macedonia
- Nazilli, Turkey
- Sioux City, United States
- Yıldırım, Turkey

== K ==
Kaçanik

- Moosseedorf, Switzerland

Klina

- Adapazarı, Turkey

Kosovo Polje

- Civita, Italy
- Frascineto, Italy
- Silifke, Turkey

== L ==
Leposavić

- Vranje, Serbia

Lipjan

- Civita, Italy
- Frascineto, Italy

== M ==
Malisheva

- Orhangazi, Turkey

Mamusha

- Büyükçekmece, Turkey
- Elazığ, Turkey
- Haliliye, Turkey
- Karacabey, Turkey
- Keçiören, Turkey
- Osmangazi, Turkey

Mitrovica

- İnegöl, Turkey
- Korçë, Albania

== N ==
North Mitrovica

- Banja Luka, Bosnia and Herzegovina
- Kraljevo, Serbia

== P ==
Peja

- Afyonkarahisar, Turkey
- Bağcılar, Turkey
- Berane, Montenegro
- Fier, Albania
- Hörby, Sweden
- Johnston, United States
- Netanya, Israel
- Nilüfer, Turkey
- Stari Grad (Sarajevo), Bosnia and Herzegovina
- Yalova, Turkey

Podujevë

- Kestel, Turkey
- Velbert, Germany

Pristina

- Ankara, Turkey
- Bursa, Turkey
- Des Moines, United States
- Kaohsiung, Taiwan
- Karachi, Pakistan
- Namur, Belgium
- Zagreb, Croatia

Prizren

- Amasya, Turkey
- Balıkesir, Turkey
- Berat, Albania
- Beykoz, Turkey
- Bingen am Rhein, Germany
- Herceg Novi, Montenegro
- Karşıyaka, Turkey
- Kavarna, Bulgaria
- Kyjov, Czech Republic
- Osijek, Croatia

== R ==
Rahovec

- Përmet, Albania

== S ==
Suva Reka

- Lilburn, United States
- Sarandë, Albania
- Serik, Turkey

== V ==
Viti

- Mason, United States

Vushtrri

- Norwalk, United States

== Z ==
Zubin Potok

- Gradiška, Bosnia and Herzegovina
