= Castrovillari =

- Comune
- Città di Castrovillari
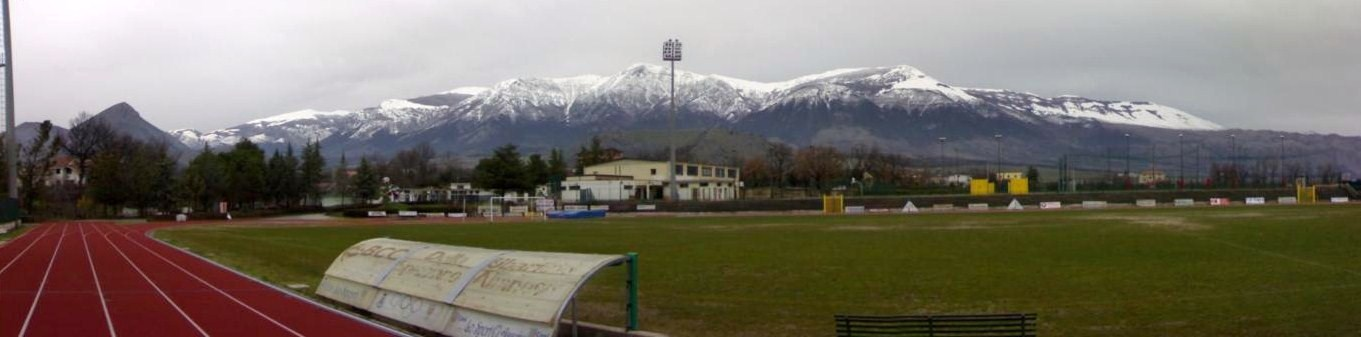
- The massif of Pollino seen from Mimmo Rende Stadium

- Coat of arms

- Castrovillari within the Province of Cosenza and Calabria

- Location within Italy Location within Calabria
- Coordinates: 39°49′N 16°12′E
- Country: Italy
- Region: Calabria
- Province: Cosenza (CS)
- Frazioni: Cammarata, Vigne

Government
  - Mayor: Domenico Lo Polito

Area
  - Total: 130 km^{2} (50 sq mi)
- Elevation: 362 m (1,188 ft)

Population (31 March 2017)
  - Total: 22,168
  - Density: 170/km^{2} (440/sq mi)
- Demonym: Castrovillaresi
- Time zone: UTC+1 (CET)
  - Summer (DST): UTC+2 (CEST)
- Postal code: 87012
- Dialing code: 0981
- Patron saint: St. Iulian
- Saint day: January 27
- Website: Official website

Castrovillari (Calabrian: Castruvìddari) is a town and comune in the province of Cosenza in the Calabria region of southern Italy.

== Geography ==
Castrovillari lies in the north of Calabria, close to the border with Basilicata and within the Pollino National Park. The town is surrounded by mountains including Pollino (2,248 m) and Dolcedorme (2,273 m), also part of the Pollino National Park.

The town borders with the municipalities of Altomonte, Lungro, Cassano allo Ionio, Cerchiara di Calabria, Chiaromonte, Civita, Frascineto, Morano Calabro, San Basile, Saracena, San Lorenzo Bellizzi, San Lorenzo del Vallo and Terranova di Pollino.

== History ==
The name derives probably from the medieval Latin castrum villarum, meaning "fortress of the villas". The place has benn inhabited since prehistoric times. The city was founded, or better fortified, during the medieval wars between the Lombards and the Byzantine Empire; the name comes from a more ancient fortress called "Sassonion" or "Saxonion", so the "Castron" appeared in some documents as "Neon Sassonion", likely the ancient Byzantine name corresponding to the medieval Latin "Castrum Villarum". Officially the city entered the history in 1064 AD when the "Castra" was occupied by Norman warriors led by Robert Guiscard. In 1090, during the reign of his son Roger Borsa, the sanctuary of "Saint Mary of the Castle" Madonna del Castello was built.

During the House of Hohenstaufen rule in southern Italy, the town obtained the title of city and was the starting point for the evangelization of Calabria by the Minor Friars Order, founded by St. Francis of Assisi.

The first Franciscan Monastery in Calabria ("Protoconvento francescano") was built here in 1220 by Pietro Cathin from Sant'Andrea of the Marca, the first Order's Prior in Calabria. The castle was built in 1490 during the Aragonese rule in southern Italy.

== Main sights ==
- Castello Aragonese
- Ponte della Catena (Bridge of the Chain), connecting the two halves of the city
- Church of San Giuliano
- Franciscan protoconvent
- Church of Madonna del Castello

== Transport ==
The town was served, until 1978, by a railway station on the now abandoned narrow gauge line Lagonegro-Lauria-Castrovillari-Spezzano Albanese, owned by the regional company Ferrovie della Calabria.

It is crossed by the A2 motorway (Salerno-Reggio Calabria) and served by two exits: "Castrovillari-Morano Calabro" and "Castrovillari-Frascineto".

== Sport ==
Castrovillari local chess team plays in the second division of the Italian team competition. Regarding football, the most representative team is the U.S. Castrovillari Calcio, commonly known as Castrovillari. The team played for several seasons in the Serie C2, the fourth highest football league in Italy and the lowest with a professional status. Its home ground is the "Mimmo Rende Stadium".

== Climate ==
Climate data for Castrovillari, elevation 362 m (1,188 ft), (1981–2010)
Month	Jan	Feb	Mar	Apr	May	Jun	Jul	Aug	Sep	Oct	Nov	Dec	Year
Mean daily maximum °C (°F)	11.6 (52.9)	12.3 (54.1)	14.7 (58.5)	17.8 (64.0)	23.5 (74.3)	28.8 (83.8)	32.0 (89.6)	31.8 (89.2)	26.9 (80.4)	22.1 (71.8)	16.6 (61.9)	12.5 (54.5)	20.9 (69.6)
Daily mean °C (°F)	7.4 (45.3)	7.6 (45.7)	9.8 (49.6)	12.5 (54.5)	17.4 (63.3)	22.1 (71.8)	25.0 (77.0)	25.0 (77.0)	20.8 (69.4)	16.7 (62.1)	11.8 (53.2)	8.4 (47.1)	15.4 (59.7)
Mean daily minimum °C (°F)	3.2 (37.8)	2.9 (37.2)	4.9 (40.8)	7.1 (44.8)	11.3 (52.3)	15.3 (59.5)	18.0 (64.4)	18.1 (64.6)	14.7 (58.5)	11.3 (52.3)	7.1 (44.8)	4.3 (39.7)	9.9 (49.7)
Average precipitation mm (inches)	84 (3.3)	79 (3.1)	70 (2.8)	57 (2.2)	38 (1.5)	24 (0.9)	22 (0.9)	22 (0.9)	58 (2.3)	69 (2.7)	92 (3.6)	86 (3.4)	701 (27.6)
Source: Istituto Superiore per la Protezione e la Ricerca Ambientale (precipitation 1951–1980)
