= Romito Cave =

Cave and archaeological site in the Pollino National Park in Calabria, Italy

- Grotta del Romito (Italian)
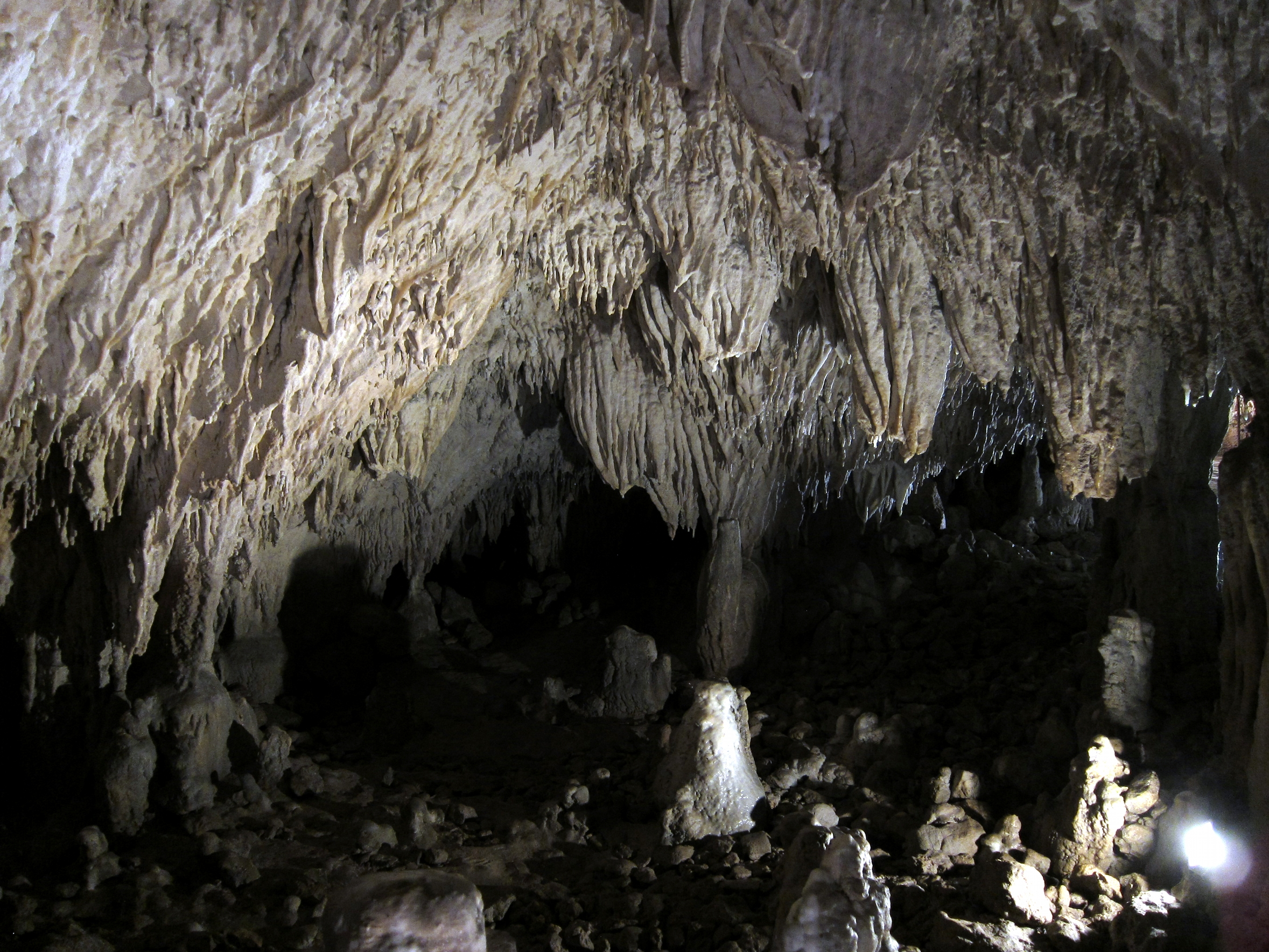
- Romito Cave

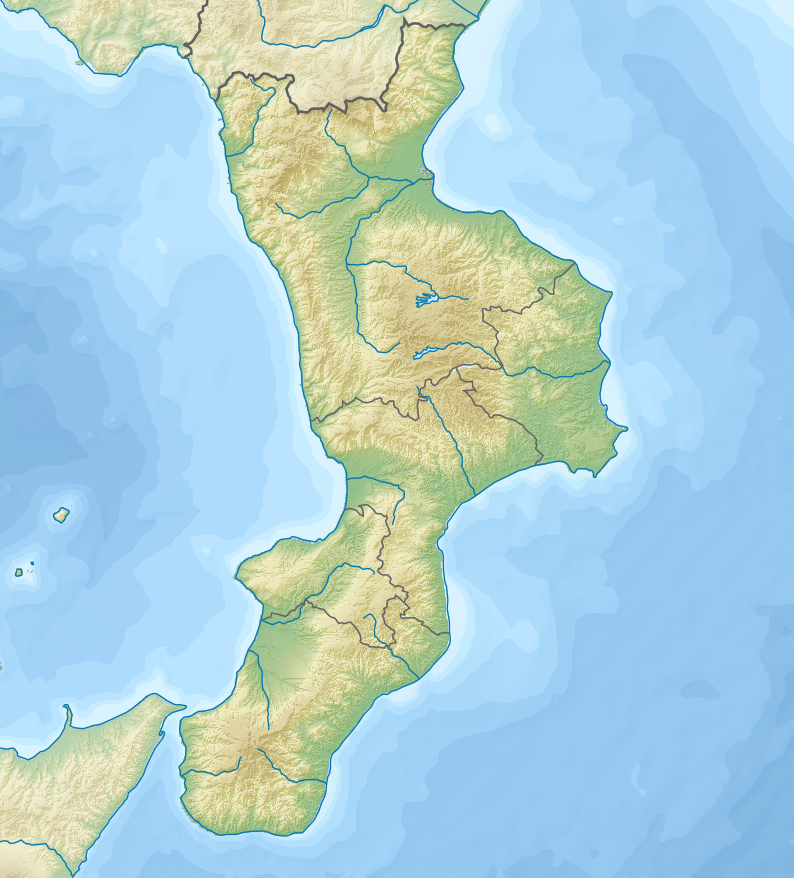
- location in Italy Romito Cave (Italy)
- 39°54′40″N 15°55′45″E
- Type: limestone karst
- Periods: late Upper Paleolithic, Neolithic, since 17,000 years BP
- Associated with: Paleo-humans
- Location: near Papasidero,
- Region: Province of Cosenza, Calabria, Italy
- Part of: Pollino National Park

Site notes
- Material: Jurassic limestone
- Height: 4 m (13 ft)
- Length: 54 m (177 ft)
- Excavation dates: 1962, 1971
- Archaeologists: Paolo Graziosi
- Public access: yes

The Romito cave (Italian: Grotta del Romito) is a natural limestone cave in the Lao Valley of Pollino National Park, near the town of Papasidero in Calabria, Italy. Stratigraphic record of the first excavation confirmed prolonged paleo-human occupation during the Upper Paleolithic from 17,000 years ago and the Neolithic from 6,400 years ago. A single, but exquisite piece of Upper Paleolithic parietal rock engraving was documented. Several burial sites of varying age were initially discovered. Irregularly recurring sessions have led to additional finds, which suggests future excavation work. Notable is the amount of accumulated data that has revealed deeper understanding of prehistoric daily life, the remarkable quality of the rock carvings and the burial named Romito 2, who exhibits features of pathological skeletal conditions (dwarfism).

== Site ==
The Grotta del Romito was discovered by Agostino Miglio, then director of the Town Museum in Castrovillari in spring of 1961, who had received curious information from several local people. (Note: sighted by two locals, Gianni Grisolia and Rocco Oliva. In 1954 amateur archaeologists Laino Bruzio, Luigi Attademo, had already mentioned the existence of a shelter with defined bull engravings) Excavations started in the summer of 1962 under the direction of Paolo Graziosi of the University of Florence. The Archaeological Park contains a small museum that presents the documentation and ongoing research.

The site consists of two distinct areas: an outer former rock shelter or overhang with a length of 34 m (112 ft) and the inner cave, embedded into the limestone formation with a length of 20 m (66 ft) and accessible via a narrow tunnel. The interior is graced with a number of curiously shaped speleothems and prehistoric graffiti.

=== Stratigraphy ===
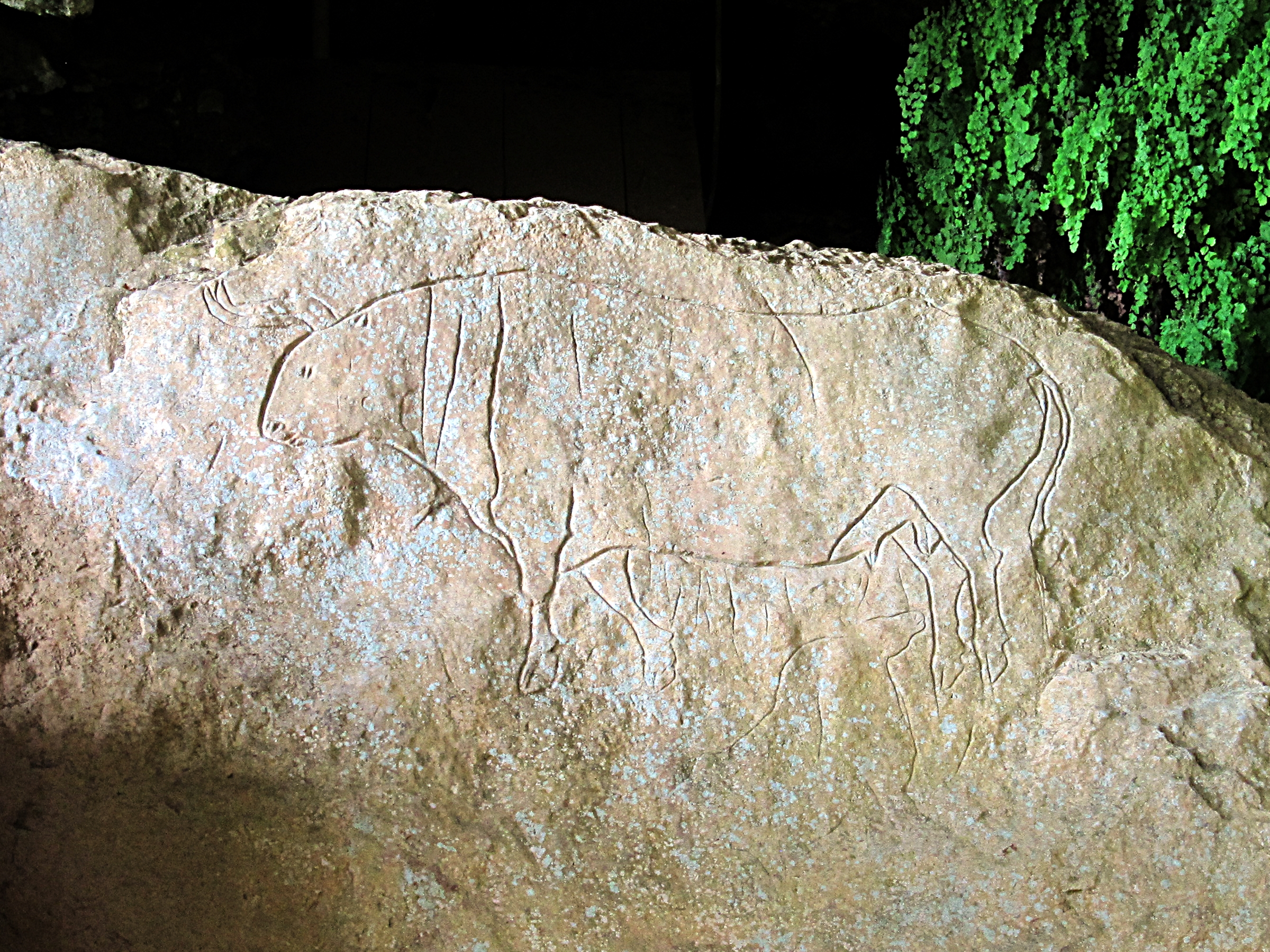
Aurochs engraving

Excavations in an enlarged trench performed in 2000, 2002, 2003 and 2007 exposed a long sequence of strata that forms seven main archaeological units (A–N) with episodes of intensive human occupation. The succession ranges from the Middle and Late Gravettian (units L-I-H-G) to the Early Epigravettian (unit F), Middle Epigravettian (lower unit E) and Late Epigravettian (upper unit E and units D-C-B). These cultural stages occurred between 26,000 and 10,000 years ago.

Deposits near the entrance are about 8 m (26 ft) thick and consist of clastic sediments. Palaeolithic deposits, up to 6 m (20 ft) thick, underlie the middle Holocene layers, around 2 m (6.6 ft) thick and contain Middle and Late Neolithic pottery. Locally derived rock blocks up to 4 m (13 ft) in size rest on the talus slope in front of, and below, the entrance, indicating that there was originally an overhang that later collapsed. Deposits of human occupation contain numerous bones and stone tools, rounded out of size-exogenous pebbles and abundant charcoal detritus which is related to fireplaces. About fifty discovered pottery shards are evidence for occupation of the cave during the Neolithic/Iron Age transition.

=== Rock engravings ===
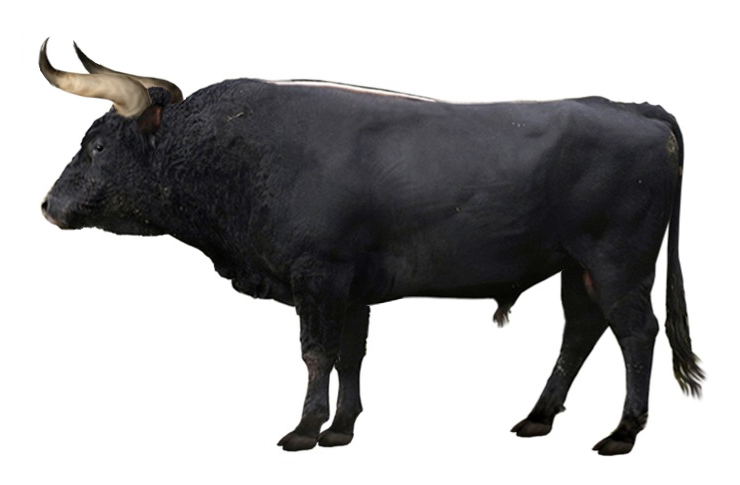
Aurochs

The bull, an Aurochs (Bos primigenius) is about 1.2 m (4 ft) long located at the mouth of the cave to the west and is engraved on three different levels of profiles. The stylistic scope is characteristic of the Mediterranean and the design of perfect proportions. The feeling of force transmitted from the overall design of the figure and the careful handling of the anatomical details amounts to the highest expression of Paleolithic realism in the region. In front of the rock another bovine figure has been cut, much more subtly, showing only the chest, head and part of the back. On the opposite end of the shelter sits another engraved boulder, covered with numerous linear signs. Both engraving are dated to between 14,000 and 12,000 BP.

=== Obsidian tools ===
The presence of large quantities of obsidian in a Neolithic layer suggests that the site was an intermediate base for the obsidian trade - that originated in the Aeolian Islands in the Tyrrhenian Sea to be transferred to the Adriatic Sea.

== Burials ==
During the first excavations three graves were found, 9,200 years old and each containing a couple of human beings, placed in epipaleolithic layers. One grave was found inside the cave, the other two underneath the adjacent rock shelter near the bull-engraved stone. The specimens were named Romito 1 - 6 and all were between 15 and 25 years old and not taller than 1.5 m (5 ft).

P. Graziosi discovered the diminutive remains of Romito 2 that turned out to be the earliest known case of dwarfism in the human skeletal record. The specimen, known as Romito 2, exhibits features typical of acromesomelic dysplasia. Romito 2 was characterized by unusually short forearms and lower legs, resulting in a rather short stature. Abnormal cartilage and bone development also affected other bones of the body, particularly those of the hands and feet. There was likely a limited extension of the elbows and arms and progressively abnormal curvature of the spine.

Besides providing evidence for a greater antiquity of dwarfism than previously known, the fact that this individual reached late adolescence attests to tolerance of Upper Paleolithic groups for severely abnormal individuals and their ability to support members who were of limited economic value to the social group.

To date, nine intact, well preserved burials have been recovered from stratigraphic layers dating from ca. 18,000 to 11,000 BP, the majority of burials corresponding to a period of climatic amelioration from ca. 15,000 to 13,000 cal BP (Final Epigravettian).
