= Scalea–Santa Domenica Talao railway station =

Railway station in Italy

Scalea
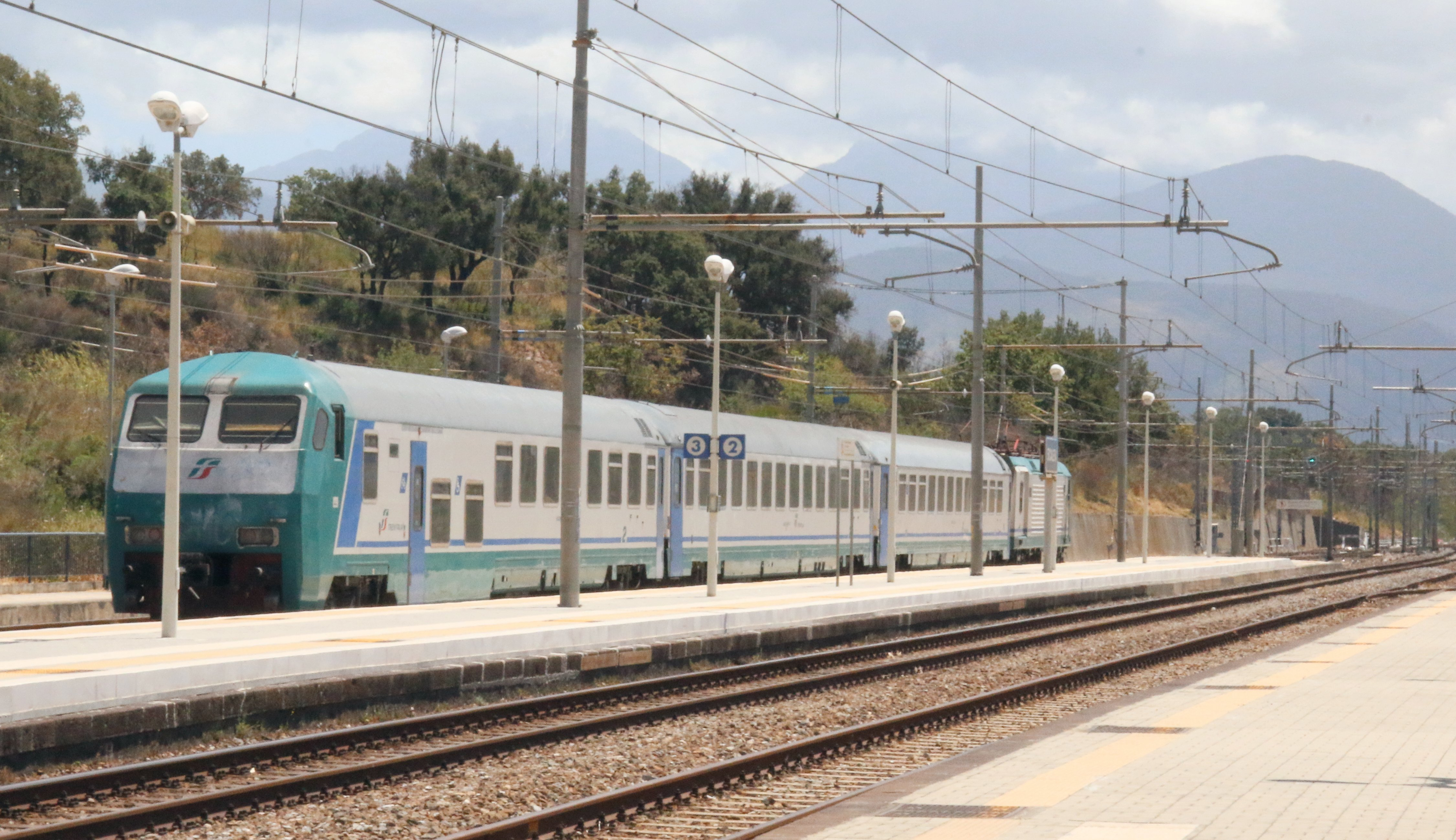
- A southbound Regionale departing from Scalea in 2017

General information
- Location: Scalea, Province of Cosenza, Calabria; Italy
- Coordinates: 39°48′29.51″N 15°48′04.25″E
- Owner: Rete Ferroviaria Italiana
- Operator: Trenitalia
- Line: Salerno–Reggio Calabria railway

History
- Opened: 1895
- Former names: Scalea

Services
Preceding station	Trenitalia	Following station
Maratea towards Milano Centrale	InterCity Notte; Milan–Syracuse	Paola towards Siracusa
Location
- Location within Calabria Location within Italy

Scalea-Santa Domenica Talao is a railway station located on the Salerno-Reggio Calabria line. It serves the towns of Scalea and Santa Domenica Talao.

== History ==
The station, originally simply called "Scalea", entered service on July 31, 1895, as part of the 122 km railway section from Praia d'Ajeta to Sant'Eufemia Marina.
