= Sapri railway station =

Railway station in Sapri, Italy

Sapri
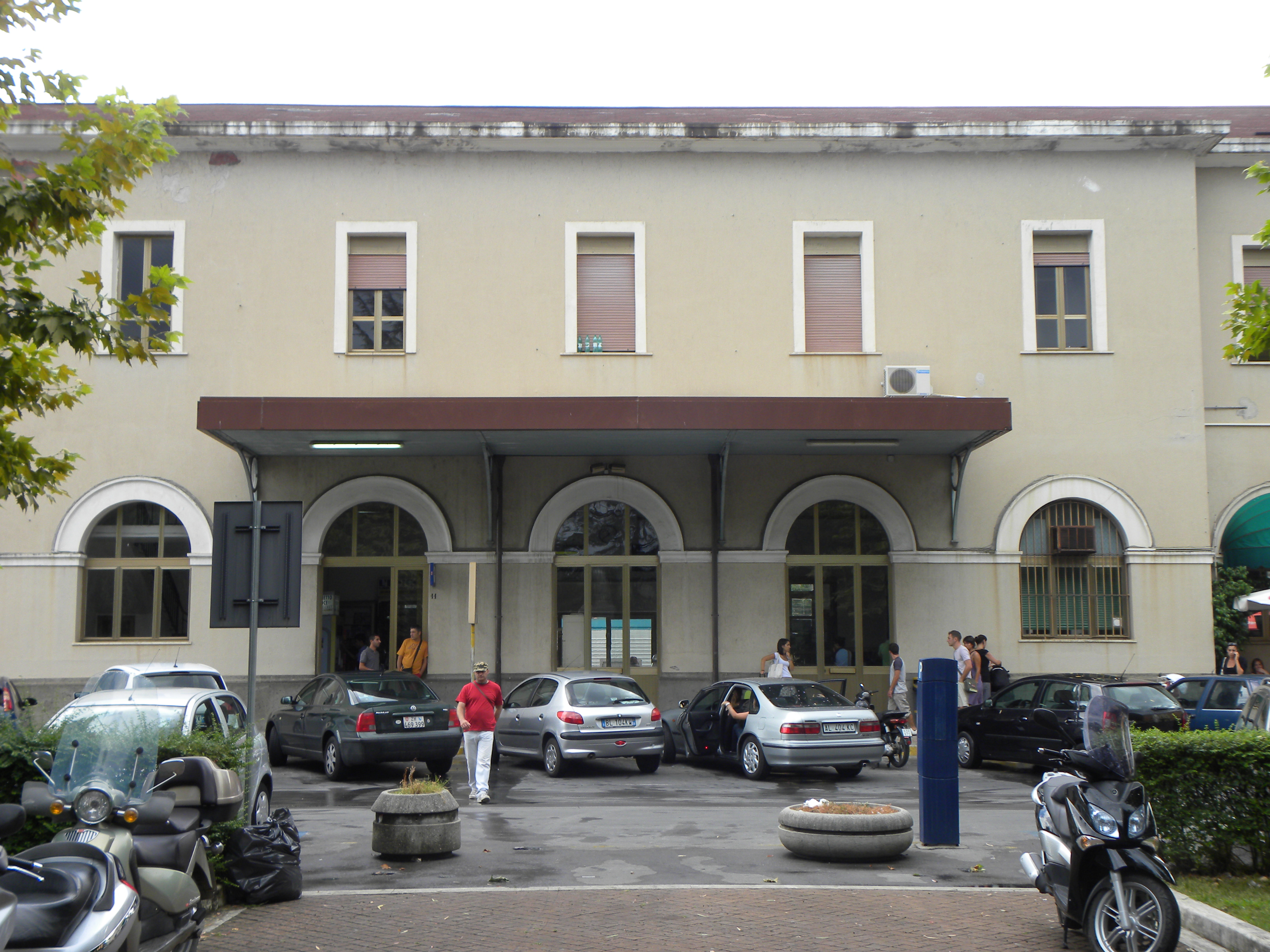

General information
- Location: Piazza Vittorio Veneto, Sapri, Province of Salerno, Campania, Italy
- Coordinates: 40°04′40″N 15°37′38″E
- Owner: Rete Ferroviaria Italiana
- Operator: Trenitalia
- Line: Salerno–Reggio Calabria railway

History
- Opened: 1894

Services
Preceding station	Trenitalia	Following station
Pisciotta–Palinuro towards Milano Centrale	InterCity Notte; Milan–Syracuse	Maratea towards Siracusa
Location
- Location within Campania Location within Italy

Sapri (Italian: Stazione di Sapri) is a railway station in Sapri, Campania, Italy, on the Salerno–Reggio Calabria railway. The train services are operated by Trenitalia. The station first opened on 30 July 1894.

== Train services ==
The station is served by the following services:

- Frecciarossa
- InterCity
- Treno interregionale
- Treno regionale

== In popular culture ==
Scenes from the James Bond film No Time to Die were filmed at the station and aboard a Frecciarossa 1000.

== See also ==
- Ferrovie dello Stato Italiane
