= San Pietro, Frascineto =

Church in the province of Cosenza, Italy

Coordinates: 39°49′45.98″N 16°15′22.64″E

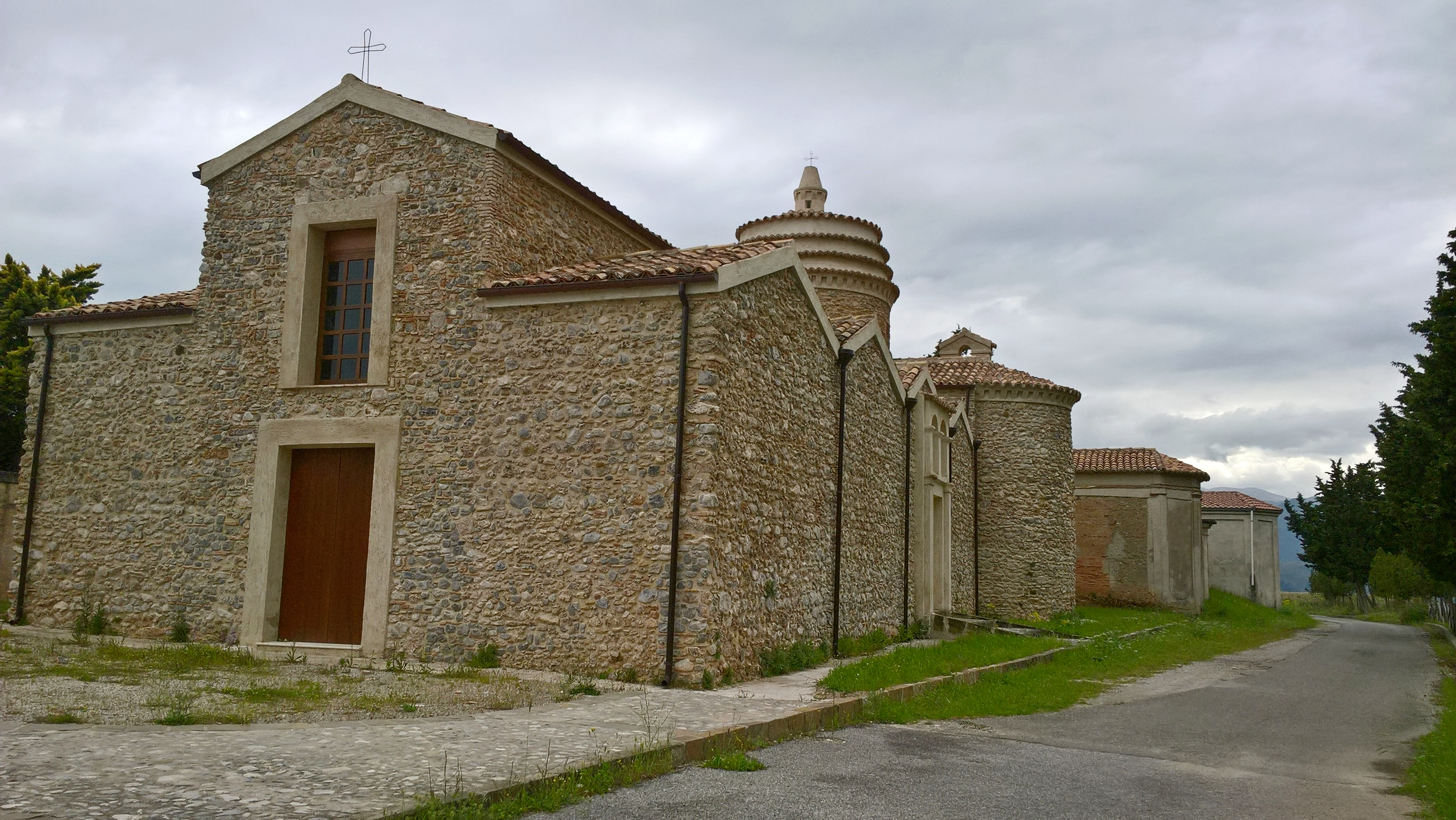
San Pietro

San Pietro (Church of St Peter) is a Byzantine style, Roman Catholic church located in the town of Frascineto, Province of Cosenza, region of Calabria, Italy.

== History ==
The church was built in the 10th century, and was property of Basilian Order monks until the 18th century. The nave, with two aisles, is oriented towards the west and has an apse, cupola and presbytery that are typically Byzantine. The church is presently deconsecrated. The dome is layers and roofed in tiles.
