= Maratea railway station =

Railway station in Maratea, Italy

Maratea
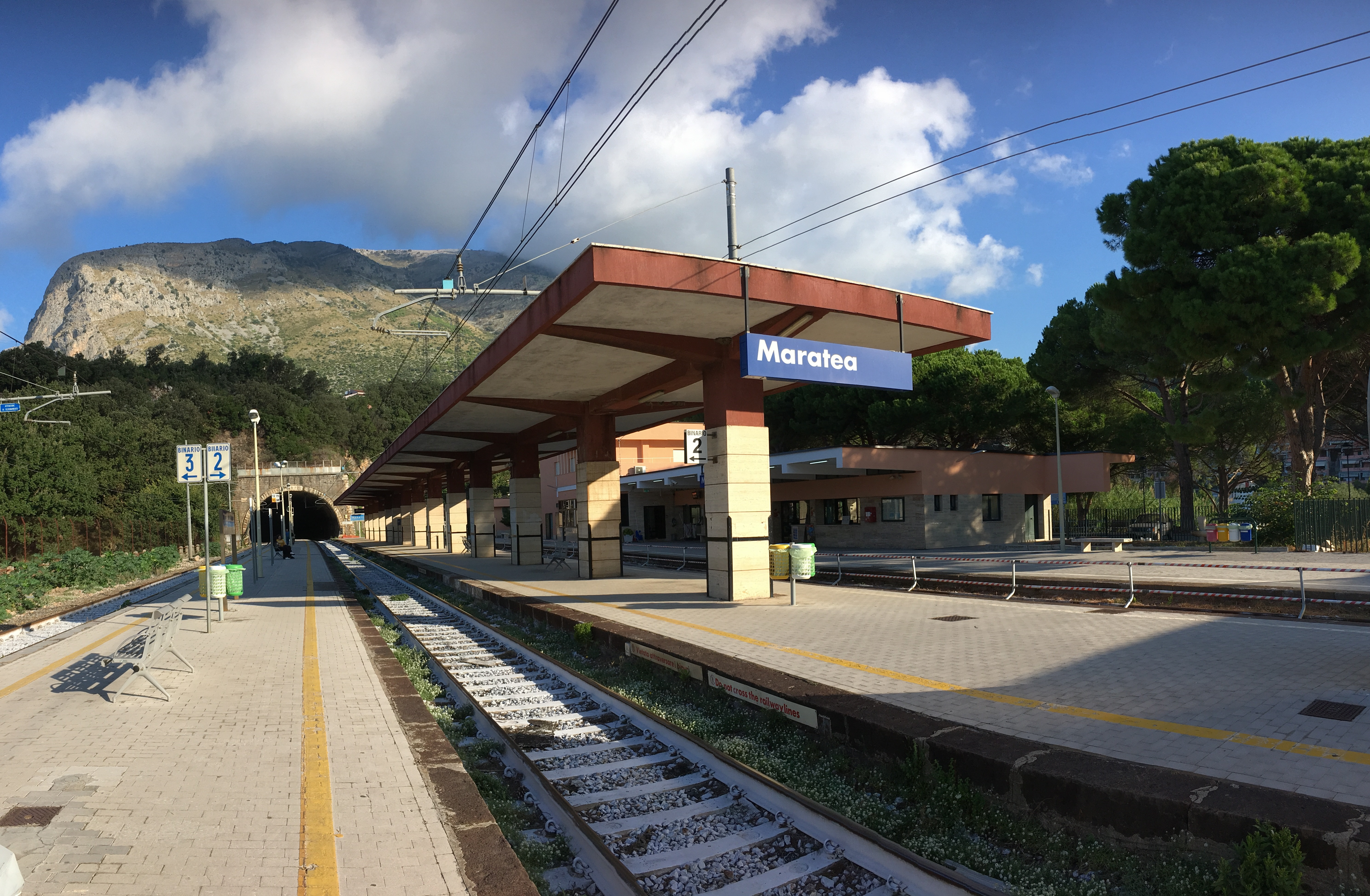

General information
- Location: Maratea, Province of Potenza, Basilicata; Italy
- Coordinates: 39°59′43.05″N 15°42′35.34″E
- Owner: Rete Ferroviaria Italiana
- Operator: Trenitalia
- Line: Salerno–Reggio Calabria railway

History
- Opened: 1894

Services
Preceding station	Trenitalia	Following station
Sapri towards Milano Centrale	InterCity Notte; Milan–Syracuse	Scalea–Santa Domenica Talao towards Siracusa
Location
- Location within Basilicata Location within Italy

Maratea is a railway station located on the Salerno–Reggio Calabria line. It serves the town of Maratea.

== History ==
=== Old station ===
The Maratea station was built by the Mediterranean Railway Company at the same time as the construction of the Tyrrhenian railway. It was opened to public service on July 30, 1894 together with the 62.7 km railway section between the Pisciotta-Palinuro and Praja-Ajeta-Tortora stations. Together with the contiguous stations of Acquafredda and Marina di Maratea (the latter built in 1916) constituted the railway access of the southern part of the province of Potenza to the national network. Starting in 1905, following the statization of the Italian railways, it became part of the infrastructure heritage of the State Railways.

=== New station ===
The station was completely rebuilt following the doubling of the Tyrrhenica in the second half of the fifties of the twentieth century. Following these works, part of it came to be found inside a large gallery due to lack of space, given the roughness of the surrounding mountainous terrain.

From June 10, 2018 to the following September it was included in the high-speed railway network with two weekly Frecciargento runs. From June 16, 2020, the Frecciargento races have become daily and extended even beyond the summer season. From June 24 of the same year, these have also been accompanied by a daily race of Frecciarossa.

Since June 13, 2021 the station is also served by Italo.
