= Gennaro Placco =

Italian poet (1826–1896)

Gennaro Andrea Antonio Placco (Civita, Calábria, 21 May 1825 - Civita, Calábria, 27 February 1896) was an Arbëresh poet who was a prominent activist of the Risorgimento.

== Life ==
Gennaro Andrea Antonio Placco was born in 1825 in Civita, Calabria, an Arbëresh community. His family was poor and his uncle, a priest, helped him enroll in an Arbëresh college. He later studied law, and became an activist of the Risorgimento movement which sought the unification of Italy. He became one of the most well-known activists among the Arbëresh, although the community had many members involved in the patriotic movement. At around the same time he started to write, mostly poems and memories. His works focused on the promotion of patriotic and liberal ideas, including more political rights for ordinary people and the unification of Italy into a single state. His life's details are in a large part known from the writings of his friend, Luigi Settembrini. Placco died in 1896, and nowadays he is remembered among the Arbëresh through a cultural organization that manages a museum, a library and an art gallery. The aim of the organization is the promotion of the Albanian language and culture among Arbëresh youth.
