= Vincenzo Dorsa =

Arbëresh writer and Albanian activist

- Born: 26 February 1823; Frascineto, Calabria
- Died: 4 December 1885 (aged 62); Cosenza
- Occupations: writer, translator, scholar

Vincenzo Dorsa (26 February 1823 – 4 December 1885) was an Arbëresh scholar, writer and translator.

== Life ==
Vincenzo Dorsa was born in 1823 to a prominent Arbëresh family. His father, Francesco, was a lawyer, and his mother was the granddaughter of Domenico Bellusci. His village, Frascineto, was settled by Albanians after the death of Skanderbeg. Influenced by the growth of interest in the Albanian people and language, and the Albanian National Awakening movement of the first half of the 19th century, in 1848 Dorsa published Dagli Albanesi, ricerche e pensieri. A summary of the history of the Albanian people, he dedicated it to "my nation divided and dispersed but one".

== See also ==
- Albanian literature
