= Papasidero =

Papasidero Greek: Papaisídoros
- Comune
- Comune di Papasidero
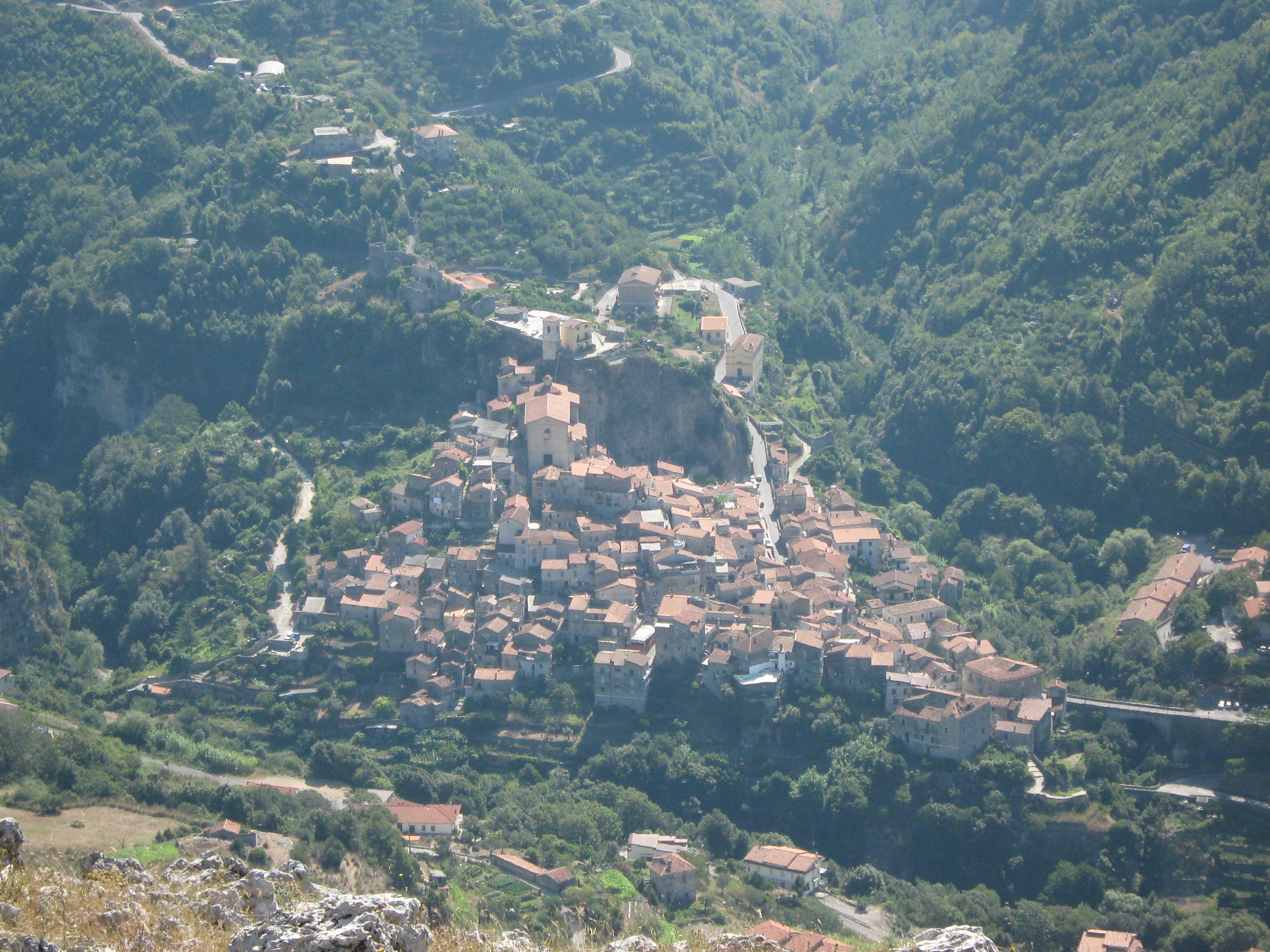

- Location within Italy Location within Calabria
- Coordinates: 39°52′N 15°54′E
- Country: Italy
- Region: Calabria
- Province: Cosenza (CS)
- Frazioni: Avena, Tremoli, Montagna, Nuppolara, Santo Nocajo, Vitimoso

Government
  - Mayor: Fiorenzo Conte

Area
  - Total: 55.22 km^{2} (21.32 sq mi)
- Elevation: 208 m (682 ft)

Population (31 December 2018)
  - Total: 671
  - Density: 12.2/km^{2} (31.5/sq mi)
- Demonym: Papasideresi
- Time zone: UTC+1 (CET)
  - Summer (DST): UTC+2 (CEST)
- Postal code: 87020
- Dialing code: 0981
- Patron saint: St. Roch
- Website: Official website

Papasidero is a village and comune in the province of Cosenza in the Calabria region, southern Italy. It is part of Pollino National Park.

== Geography ==
Papasidero is situated on a rocky spur 210 m above the sea level and is crossed by Lao and Santo Nocajo rivers. It is 18 km from SA-RC motorway and 23 km from the Tyrrhenian sea. Its territory covers an area of 54 square km and is entirely part of Pollino National Park.

== History ==
The name Papasidero derives from the name of an abbot (in Greek Papas-Isidoros, father or priest Isidore) head of a monastery in the Mercuriense Region, home of Basilian Greek monasticism.

Humans have occupied the area since prehistoric times, as confirmed by an important archaeological site, LaGrotta Romito, discovered in 1961. The historical centre has a typically medieval urban style. It was built over the 12th and 13th centuries. From Lombard beginnings, it became a fortress castle in the Sveva Norman period (1190–1250) and was expanded under the Angevins in the 14th century, and under Aragon (from 1400 to 1500).

The church of Saint Constantine became a parish in 1510. The place was possessed by the descendants of the Norman Alitto of Sanseverino and Spinelli di Scalea until 1806. Since 1593 a Monte di Pietà has operated, set up by Owen Lewis (Ludovico Audoeno) who was Bishop of Cassano; and starting from the 17th century the Brotherhood of the Assumption. Carlo Paolino (1723–1803) humanist, Francesco Mastroti (1777–1847) teacher, and Maria Angelica Mastroti (1851–1891) mystic, were all born here.

== Main sights ==
- The abandoned village of Avena. The Mother Church has a Byzantine fresco from the early 11th century.
- Grotto of the Romito, 13 km outside Papasidero, discovered in 1961 and housing pre-historic graffiti.
- Sanctuary of Constantinople (17th-18th centuries)

=== Sanctuary of Constantinople ===
A Byzantine church dating from the year one thousand, the Mother Shrine of Constantinople XVII Century was built in the middle of 600 was extended to the end of 700 and in the first half of the 19th century. It has a T plan with three naves. A large fresco was painted between 700 and 800, depicting the Virgin and Child and a bishop kneeling before the high Archangel Michele who pierces Satan in flames.

=== Romito Cave ===
This important discovery, which occurred in 1961 in the territory of Papasidero, has shed a light on events in prehistoric northern Calabria, and showed that it was inhabited at least 20,000 years ago. The Romito man was a Cro-Magnon; he did not keep cattle or practise agriculture or make ceramics. The cave is divided into two distinct areas: the actual cave, about twenty metres deep, which goes into the limestone formation with a narrow dark tunnel, and the guard that extends for about 34 metres east–west.

Homo sapiens occupied the cave continuously leaving countless relics of bone and stone tools, wonderful graffiti and their skeletal remains. Carbon 14 dating proves occupation since 4470 BC (Neolithic). In the Upper Paleolithic layers, the oldest dating is around 16,800 BC.

The figure of a bull, about 1.2 metres long, is engraved on a boulder of about 2.3 metres in length at an angle of 45°. The design of perfect proportions, is made with stretch safely. The nostrils, mouth, eye and ear are represented with some care. Folds in the skin of the neck are clear and the cloven foot is very accurately shown.

Below the great figure of a bull, another bovine figure has been cut, much more subtly, showing only the chest, head and part of the back. In front of the rock with the cattle, there is another figure about 3.5 metres long, with a linear cut, whose meaning is incomprehensible. The occupation of the Neolithic cave of Romito (it:Grotta del Romito) is documented by the discovery of fifty ceramic pieces that reveal trade in obsidian from the Aeolian Islands. The place of their discovery, and the facsimile of a tomb dated from 9200 years BC, can be visited. Two individuals have been arranged in a well-defined ritual.

One burial was found in the cave and another two couples in the shelter of the rock overhang just outside the cave, not far from the rock with the figure of the bull. Of these pairs of skeletons, the first is kept in the National Museum of Reggio Calabria, the second is in the Florentine Museum of Prehistory. The third is still being studied by the Institute of Prehistory of Florence. Recent excavations have unearthed the remains of a fourth burial, even more ancient, clear evidence of an intense occupation by prehistoric man. About 300 obsidian chips have been found in the different layers of the shelter and the cave.

The Archaeological Park contains a small museum, teaching all the essential information.

=== Lao River ===
The Lao river is a short perennial river on the Tyrrhenian side of Calabria. It takes its name from the town of Laos, a city of Magna Grecia.

Over 50 km long, it originates in Basilicata from Monte Serra del Prete on the Massif Pollino, 2000m in altitude. It is known in the territory of Viggianello (PZ), as the Mercure. Here the river runs from E-W to NE-SW. Where the tributaries meet the river is named the Lao. From this point there is abundant water throughout the year. It enters a spectacular gorge flowing for several kilometres.

Despite great variations in flow (especially in autumn when it can lead to massive flooding), the Lao is clearly distinguishable from other rivers of the region for its average flow (of about 10 m/s) and its minimum (in summer rarely dropping below 4 m/s), thanks to the remarkable permeability of a large part of its catchment, making it the most important watercourse of Tyrrhenian Calabria, by volume of water and the most important in summer. Because of these unique characteristics, and for the purity of its waters, and the beauty and length of the Ingoli stretch, the river is popular with fans of rafting and canoeing. The Lao also gives its name to the Riserva Statale Valle del Fiume Lao, established in 1987 within the National Park of Pollino.
