= Cerchiara di Calabria =

- Comune
- Comune di Cerchiara di Calabria
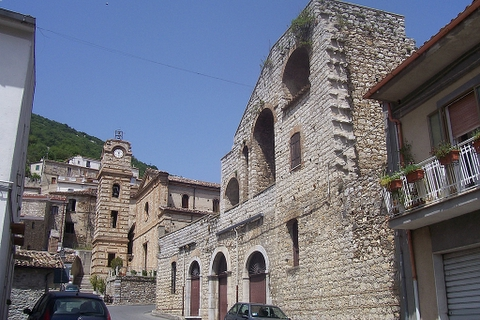

- Coat of arms

- Location within Italy Location within Calabria
- Coordinates: 39°51′N 16°23′E
- Country: Italy
- Region: Calabria
- Province: Cosenza (CS)

Government
  - Mayor: Antonio Carlomagno

Area
  - Total: 81 km^{2} (31 sq mi)

Population (30 June 2012)
  - Total: 2,447
  - Density: 30/km^{2} (78/sq mi)
- Demonym: Cerchiaresi
- Time zone: UTC+1 (CET)
  - Summer (DST): UTC+2 (CEST)
- Postal code: 87070
- Dialing code: 0981
- Patron saint: St. Boniface
- Website: Official website

Cerchiara di Calabria is a town and comune in the province of Cosenza, part of the Calabria region of southern Italy.

Located in the Pollino National Park, Cercharia occupies the ancient site of Arponium in Magna Graecia, later known as Circlarium. During the Norman period it was part of the lands of the Clermont (Chiaramonte) family, when most of the Byzantine institutions were reformed in the Latin rite.

The town's main attraction is the Sanctuary of S. Maria delle Armi. The cells of hermit monks of Greek origin on Monte Sellario were already established by the 10th century. In the mid-15th century a cult developed in connection with ancient Byzantine icons. The small chapel shrine excavated in the rock was enlarged in the early 16th century under the patronage of Pietro Antonio Sanseverino. In following eras a hospice for pilgrims was added and the palace of the Pignatelli di Cerchiara family. The resulting church is made asymmetrical by its position against the cliff face.
