= Frascineto =

- Comune
- Comune di Frascineto
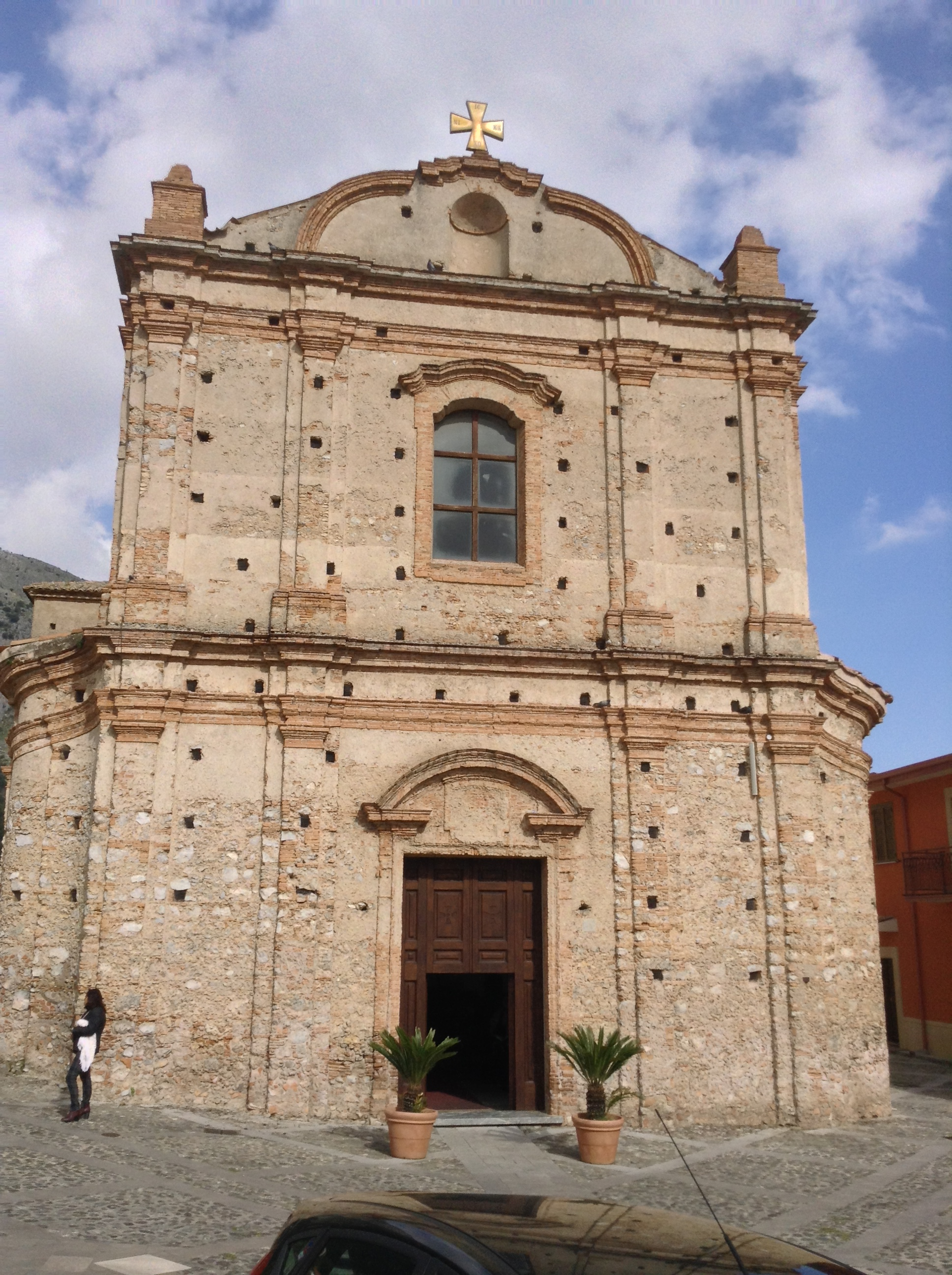
- Church of Assumption of Mary.

- Location within Italy Location within Calabria
- Coordinates: 39°50′N 16°16′E
- Country: Italy
- Region: Calabria
- Province: Cosenza (CS)
- Frazioni: Eianina

Government
  - Mayor: Angelo Catapano

Area
  - Total: 29.11 km^{2} (11.24 sq mi)
- Elevation: 486 m (1,594 ft)

Population (28 February 2017)
  - Total: 2,094
  - Density: 71.93/km^{2} (186.3/sq mi)
- Demonym: Frascignotti or Frascinoti
- Time zone: UTC+1 (CET)
  - Summer (DST): UTC+2 (CEST)
- Postal code: 87010
- Dialing code: 0981
- Patron saint: Immaculate Conception
- Saint day: 8 December
- Website: Official website

Frascineto (Arbëreshë Albanian: Frasnita) is a town and comune in the province of Cosenza in the Calabria region of southern Italy. It is home to an Arbëresh minority.

== Notable people ==
- Vincenzo Dorsa Arbëresh scholar, writer and translator

== See also ==
- San Pietro, Frascineto
