= Pollino National Park =

National park in Italy

Parco Nazionale del Pollino
- IUCN category II (national park)
- Location within Italy
- Location: Basilicata and Calabria, Italy
- Nearest city: Morano Calabro
- Coordinates: 39°55′36″N 16°06′41″E
- Area: 1,925.65 km^{2} (743.50 sq mi)
- Established: 1993
- Governing body: Ministero dell'Ambiente

Pollino National Park (Italian: Parco Nazionale del Pollino) is an Italian national park in the southern Italian Peninsula, in the provinces of Cosenza, Matera and Potenza. Its named from the homonymous mountain massif Pollino. The park is home of the oldest European tree, a Heldreich's pine estimated 1,230 years old and the symbol of the park is the rare Bosnian pine tree. Since November 2015, with the inclusion in the global list of geoparks by UNESCO, the Pollino Park is considered a World Heritage Site. Encompassing a total of 88,650 ha in the Lucanian side (Muro lucano) and 103,915 in the Calabrian one is the largest park in the country covering 1,925.65 square kilometers and among the 50 largest in the world. The common beech is the park's most prevalent tree and the park is also home to a variety of important medicinal herbs.

Towns with interesting sights include Rotonda, Castrovillari, Morano Calabro (convent of Colloreto), Laino Borgo, Laino Castello, Mormanno, Scalea, Papasidero, Civita, Cerchiara (church of Madonna delle Armi). Albanian-speaking communities are present in communes such as San Paolo Albanese, San Costantino Albanese and others. In the Valle del Mercure have been discovered remains of pre-historic species such as Elephas antiquus and Hippopotamus major.

Rivers and streams include the Lao, Sinni, Coscile, Garga, and Raganello.

Wildlife include golden eagle, Italian wolf, roe deer, wild boar, red fox, European otter, Calabrian black squirrel, forest dormouse (Dryomys nitedula), black woodpecker, chough, peregrine falcon, red kite, lanner falcon, Egyptian vulture and red deer (were introduced in the 2000s).
