= Civita, Calabria =

Civita Çifti
- Comune
- Comune di Civita
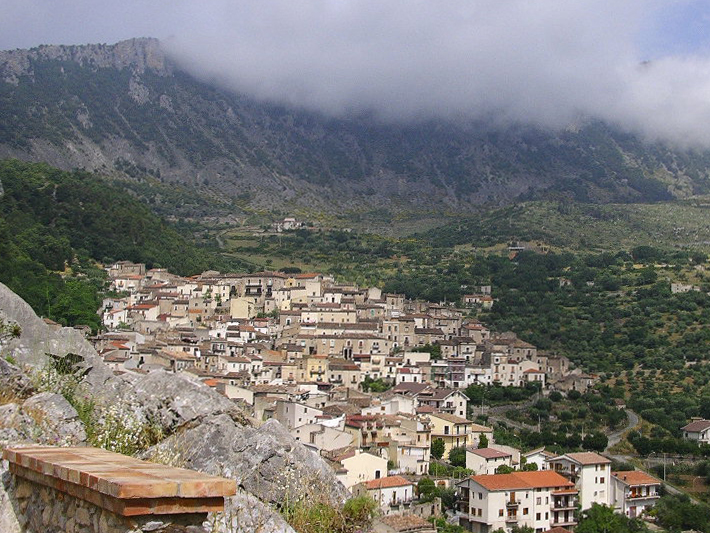
- Civita panorama

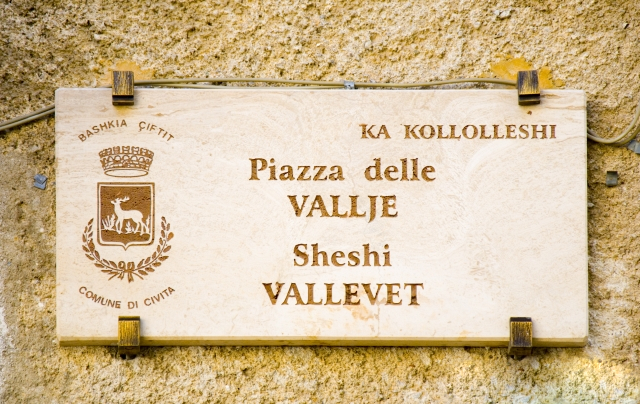
- Coat of arms

- Location within Italy Location within Calabria
- Coordinates: 39°50′N 16°19′E
- Country: Italy
- Region: Calabria
- Province: Cosenza (CS)

Government
  - Mayor: Alessandro Tocci

Area
  - Total: 27 km^{2} (10 sq mi)
- Elevation: 450 m (1,480 ft)

Population (December 31, 2004)
  - Total: 1,124
  - Density: 42/km^{2} (110/sq mi)
- Demonym: Civitesi
- Time zone: UTC+1 (CET)
  - Summer (DST): UTC+2 (CEST)
- Postal code: 87010
- Dialing code: 0981
- Patron saint: St. Blaise
- Website: Official website

Civita (Arbërisht: Çifti) is a hilltown and comune in the province of Cosenza in the Calabria region of southern Italy. Facing the Ionian Sea, it is part of the Pollino National Park. It is one of I Borghi più belli d'Italia ("The most beautiful villages of Italy").

It was founded in the 15th century by Albanian refugees from the Ottoman invasion. The Civitesi are part of an ethnic minority (Arbëreshë) officially recognized by the Italian laws.

== Main sights ==
- Ponte del Diavolo (Devil's Bridge).
- Raganello Canyons.
- Church with Byzantine mosaics and a precious icon.
- Arbëreshë Ethnic Museum.

== Notable people ==
- Gennaro Placco
