= Provola silana =

Italian cheese

- Country of origin: Italy
- Region: Calabria
- Texture: Semi-hard
- Certification: PAT

Provola silana is a variety of cheese typical of the Sila area, in the Calabria region of Italy.

== Characteristics ==
Provola silana is a semi-hard pasta filata ('stretched-curd') cheese obtained thanks to the processing of cow's milk coming from the various cattle breeds raised in the area. It is distinguished by its typical shape defined as oval or truncated cone.

It has a thin and very homogeneous crust, rather smooth and with a yellow color. Internally the texture is homogeneous to compact, with white or very light yellow holes that become more intense as the inside of the cheese is reached.

It is produced following the ancient processing methods within the territory surrounding the Sila mountains between the comuni (municipalities) of San Giovanni in Fiore, Pedace, Spezzano della Sila, Longobucco, Serra Pedace and Castelsilano, in the provinces of Cosenza, Crotone and Catanzaro.

== Preparation ==
Freshly milked raw milk is filtered and rennet is added. It is then coagulated at a temperature of about 37 °C. Once firm, the clot is broken in order to obtain six small granules and the curd is heated up to 40–45 °C. After heating, the curd is kept stirred to favor dehydration and is left to settle on the bottom. At this point the curd is extracted, left to rest for a few days and then spun; the forms thus obtained are finally immersed in cold water to favor their firming.

== See also ==
- List of Italian cheeses
