= Cecita Lake =

Artificial lake in Calabria, Italy

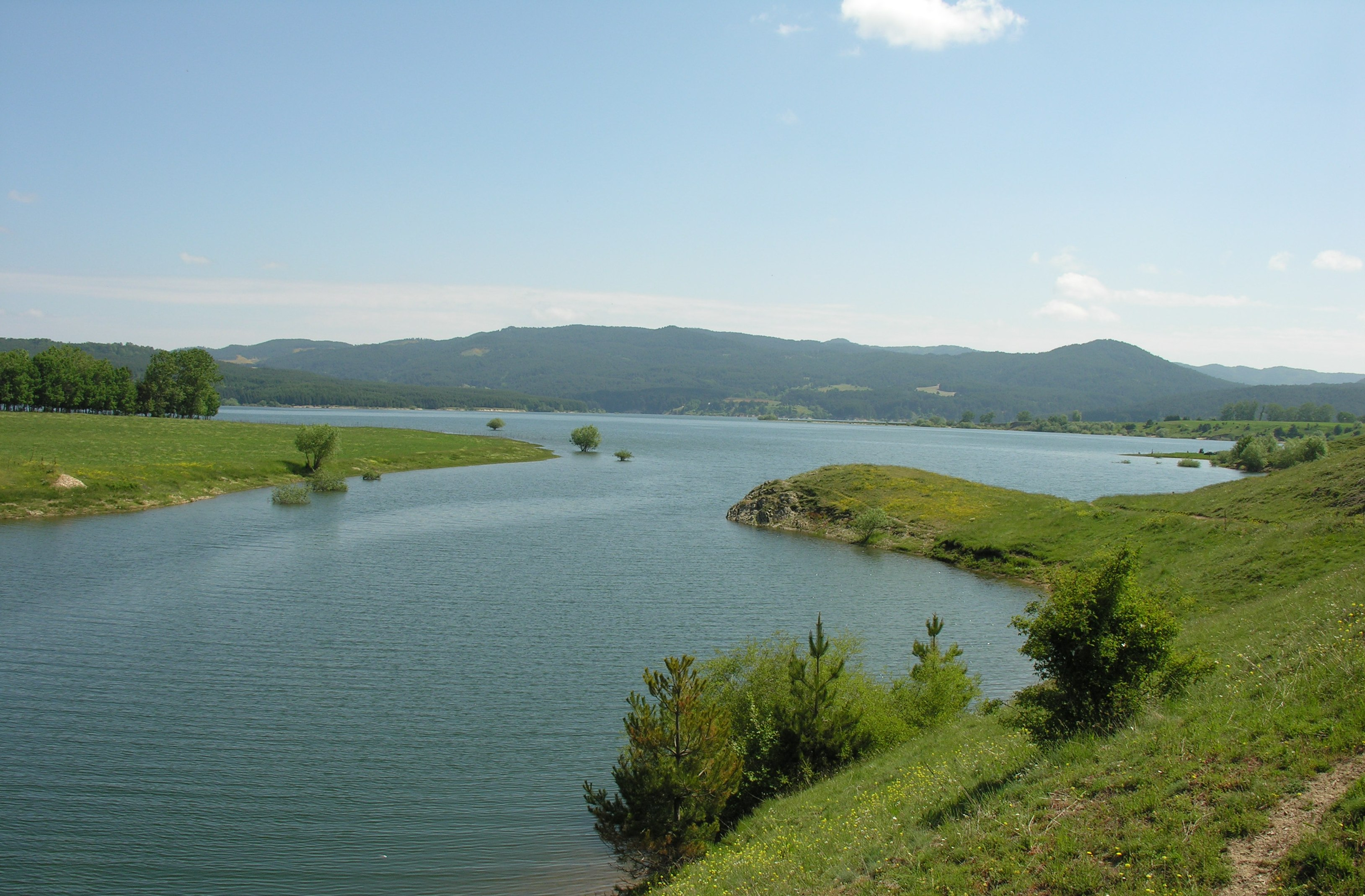

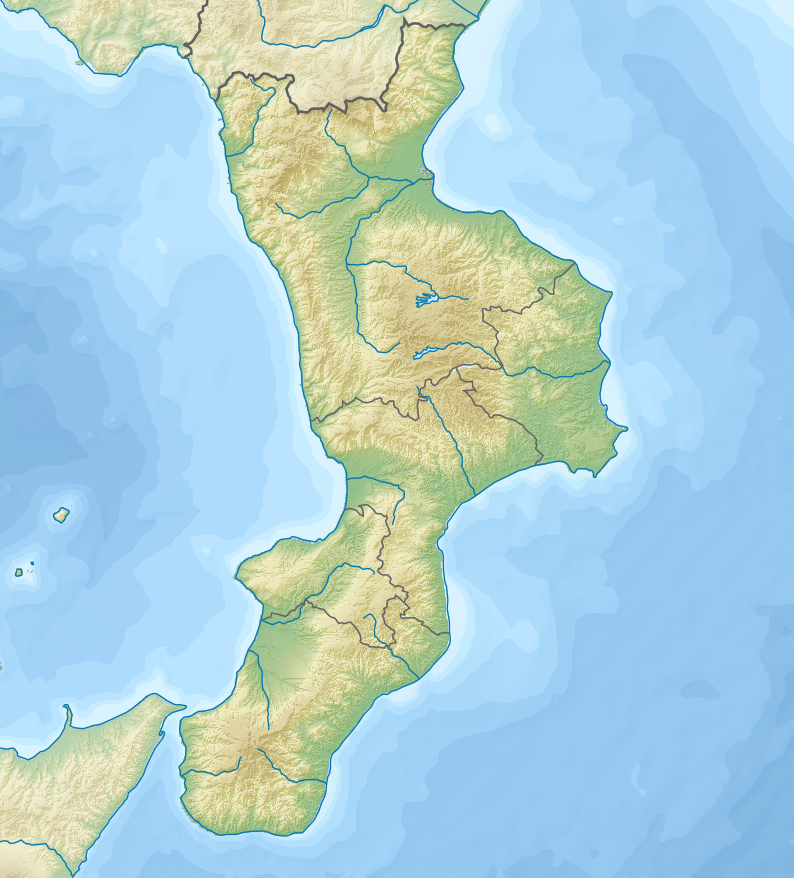
- Location within Calabria
- Location: Province of Cosenza, Calabria
- Coordinates: 39°22′59″N 16°31′12″E
- Type: Artificial
- Catchment area: 154.5 km^{2} (59.7 sq mi)
- Basin countries: Italy
- Max. length: 7.5 km (4.7 mi)
- Surface area: 12.6 km^{2} (4.9 sq mi)
- Water volume: 108 hm^{3} (88,000 acre⋅ft)
- Surface elevation: 1,143 m (3,750 ft)

Cecita Lake (Italian: Lago di Cecita) is a man made lake in the province of Cosenza, Calabria, southern Italy.

== Geography ==
Lake Cecita is a man made reservoir created by constructing a hydroelectric dam on the Mucone River in the province of Cosenza, along La Sila mountain range near the Calabrian town of Camigliatello Silano. Its banks pass through towns Spezzano della Sila, Longobucco, and Celico. The lake was created by damming the Mucone, which flows from the slopes of mount Serra Stella, located between Monte Curcio and Monte Scuro, and into the Crati valley. The dam was built in the Cecita valley near Cecita creek, a tributary of the Mucone. The creek is named after the valley, as are the dam and lake.

Dam construction began in 1947 by then local company Lodigiani, now known as Salini Impregilo, on behalf of energy producer S.M.E., Southern Electrical Society of Naples, and was completed in 1951.

The lake is located on the western border of Sila National Park. The Mucone flows into and out of the lake. The dam is 55 metres (180 ft) high. The dam is also used to irrigate surrounding fields, which are largely used to grow potatoes. South of the lake are Lago di Ariamacina and Botte Donato.
