= Spezzano =

Spezzano may refer to several Italian places:

- Spezzano Albanese, a municipality in the Province of Cosenza
- Spezzano della Sila, a municipality in the Province of Cosenza
- Spezzano Piccolo, a frazione of Casali del Manco in the Province of Cosenza
- Spezzano, a frazione of Fiorano Modenese, in the province of Modena
