= Mucone =

River in Cosenza, Italy

Location
- Country: Italy
- Region: Calabria
- Province: Cosenza

Physical characteristics
- Source
  - location: La Sila
  - coordinates: 39°29′N 16°14′E
- Mouth: Crati
  - coordinates: 39.4819°N 16.2189°E
- Length: 54 km (34 mi)
- Discharge
  - average: 5 m^{3}/s (180 cu ft/s)

Basin features
- Progression: Crati→ Gulf of Taranto
- Waterbodies: Cecita Lake

The Mucone is a river in the province of Cosenza, Calabria, southern Italy. The source of the river is in La Sila north of Botte Donato. It flows into Lago di Cecita and flows out of the lake near the western border of Sila National Park. The river flows northwest before curving west near Acri. It flows near Bisignano before flowing into the Crati east of Torano Castello. The Mucone is the largest right tributary of the Crati.
