= Neto (river) =

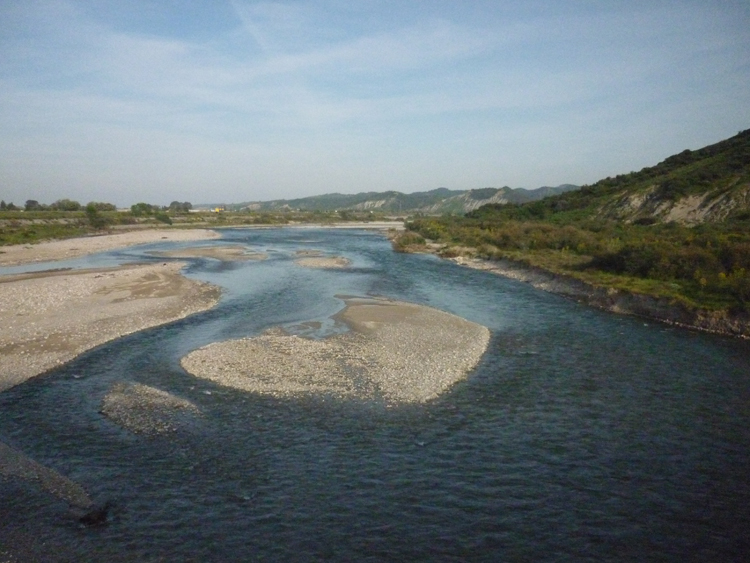
- The Neto near Santa Severina

Location
- Country: Italy
- Region: Calabria

Physical characteristics
- Source: Sila Mountains
  - location: Timpone Sorbella
  - elevation: 1,850 m (6,070 ft)
- Mouth: Gulf of Taranto
  - location: Fasana
  - coordinates: 39.2057°N 17.1480°E
- Length: 80 km (50 mi)
- Basin size: 1,070 km^{2} (410 sq mi)
- Discharge
  - average: 36 m^{3}/s (1,300 cu ft/s)

Basin features
- Tributaries
  - left: Lese, Vitravo
  - right: Arvo, Ampollino

The Neto (Latin Neaethus) is a river in Calabria, southern Italy. It is the second longest river of Calabria after the Crati.

== Geography ==
The Neto rises in the central Sila Mountains in the province of Cosenza. Its source is at Timpone Sorbella at an elevation of 1,850 meters, near Botte Donato, the highest peak in the Sila Mountains. The river flows east into Lago di Ariamacina before curving southeast. The Neto is joined by a right tributary, the Arvo, at San Giovanni in Fiore. The river is joined by another right tributary, the Ampollino, where it crosses into the province of Crotone near Cotronei and Caccuri. The Neto then flows east and is joined by a left tributary, the Lese, and flows near Santa Severina and Rocca di Neto. The river is joined by another left tributary, the Vitravo, before entering the Ionian Sea between Cirò Marina and Crotone. It has a drainage basin of 1,070 square kilometres (410 sq mi).
