= Coscile =

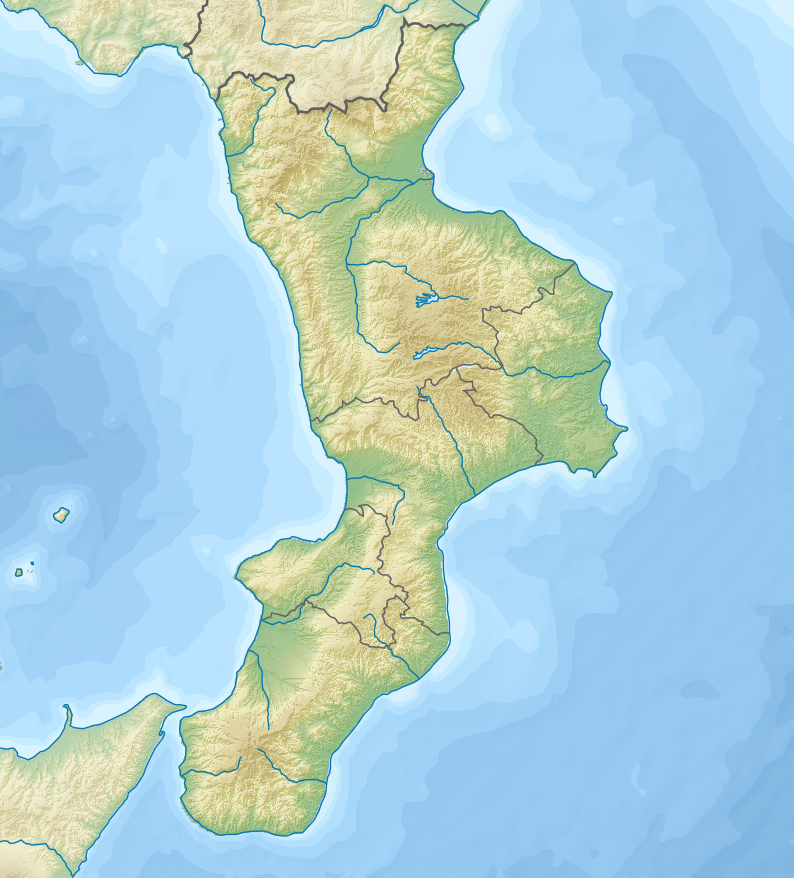
- Location of the mouth of the Coscile Coscile (Italy)

Location
- Country: Italy
- Region: Calabria

Physical characteristics
- Source: Pollino massif
  - elevation: 1,700 m (5,600 ft)
- Mouth: Crati river
  - coordinates: 39°42′11″N 16°27′37″E
- Length: 50 km (31 mi)
- Basin size: 948 km^{2} (366 sq mi)
- Discharge
  - average: 14 m^{3}/s (490 cu ft/s)

Basin features
- Progression: Crati→ Gulf of Taranto
- Tributaries
  - right: Garga, Esaro

The Coscile is a river in Calabria, southern Italy. In classical antiquity it was known as the Sybaris (Greek: Σύβαρις) and gave its name to the Ancient Greek city. It is the third-largest river in the region in terms of water discharge and the extent of its basin after the Crati and Neto. It is the main left tributary of the Crati.

== Geography ==
The river is about 50 kilometers long and has a large basin of approximately 950 km^{2}. It collects the waters of many springs at the foot of the Pollino massif and the Serra Dolcedorme through the tributaries Esaro, Tiro and Garga. Initially its course is towards the south-east through the plain of Sibari, but changes to an eastern direction after its confluence with the Esaro river. The Esaro is its main tributary which almost triples its discharge. The river then feeds into the Crati just east of Apollinara, a frazione in the comune of Corigliano Calabro.

The river is crossed in several places by the A2 motorway from Salerno to Reggio Calabria from the pass of Campotenese (at an elevation of 1000 meters), a frazione of Morano Calabro, to Castrovillari. Near Spezzano Albanese the river is also crossed by the railway line from Cosenza to Sibari.

== Hydrology ==
Due to its various sources and especially the rich supply of the Esaro, the river is the third river of Calabria in terms of discharge with 14 m^{3}/s average annual flow. The importance of its basin area is demonstrated by the presence of three Enel power plants. It is a seasonal river with strong winter runoff and a lower discharge in summer, pouring 5 m^{3}/s in the Crati during August.

== History ==
The Greek geographer Strabo claimed that Greek colonists named the river Sybaris after a spring of the same name at Bura in Achaea. He also alleges that its water made the horses who drank it shy, which is why all herds were kept away from it. In the time of Sybaris the Coscile was not a tributary of the Crati but pursued a direct course to the Gulf of Taranto. It probably followed a course at a short distance to the north of Sybaris.
