= Garga (river) =

Location
- Country: Italy
- Region: Calabria
- Province: Cosenza

Physical characteristics
- Source: Pollino
- Mouth: Coscile
  - coordinates: 39.7352°N 16.2673°E

Basin features
- Progression: Coscile→ Crati→ Gulf of Taranto

The Garga is a river in the province of Cosenza, Calabria, southern Italy. Its source is Pollino National Park near Morano Calabro. The river flows southeast near Saracena before curving east near Firmo. It then joins the Coscile as a right tributary of that river.
