= Lago Arvo =

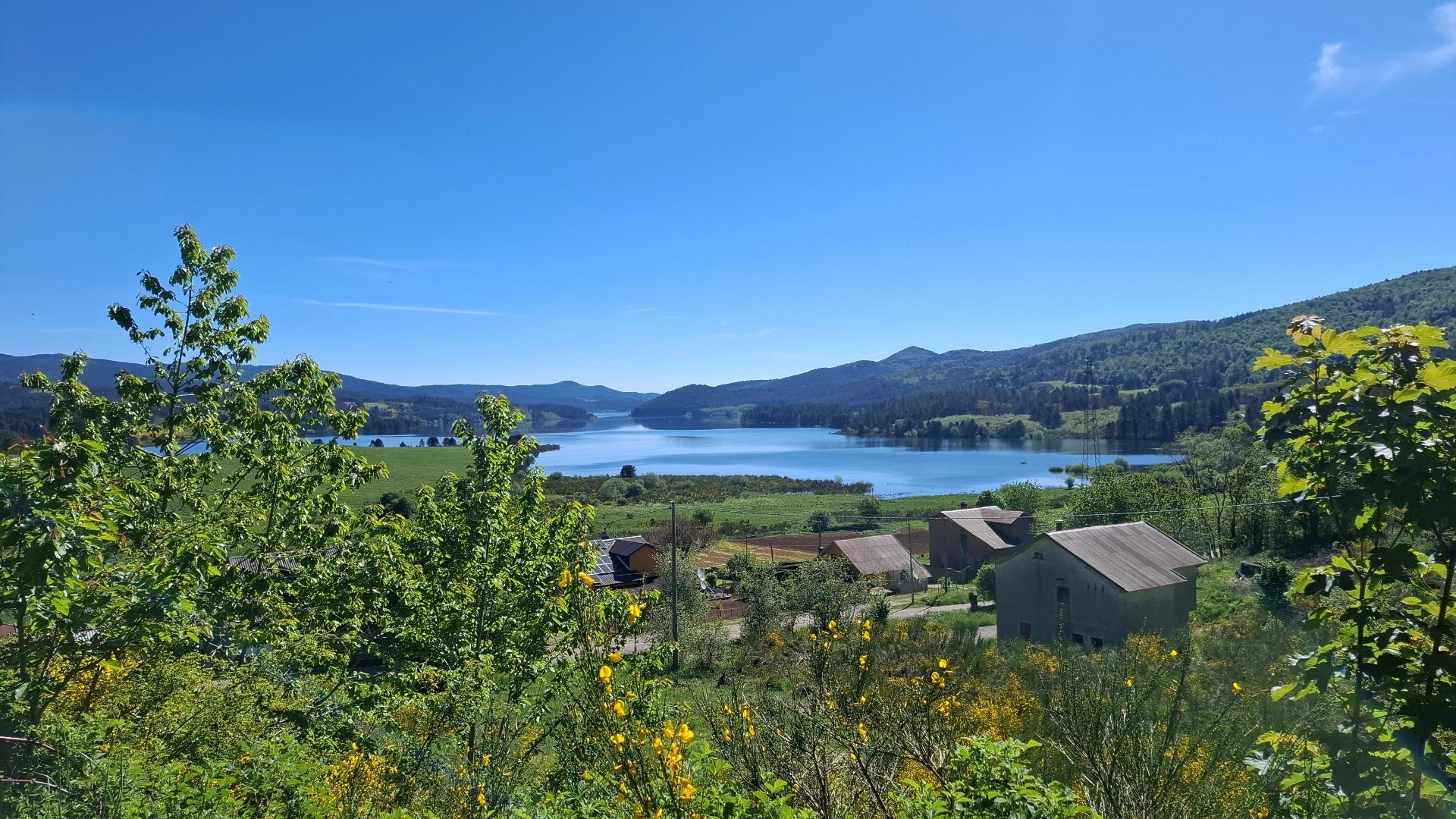

- Location within Italy
- Location: La Sila, Calabria
- Coordinates: 39°14′24″N 16°30′00″E
- Type: reservoir
- River sources: Arvo
- Basin countries: Italy
- Built: 1927
- First flooded: 1931
- Average depth: 30 m (98 ft)
- Water volume: 0.07 km^{3} (57,000 acre⋅ft)
- Surface elevation: 1,280 m (4,200 ft)

Lago Arvo is a lake in the province of Cosenza, Calabria, southern Italy. It is located in La Sila east of Aprigliano and west of San Giovanni in Fiore. The lake is south of Lago di Ariamacina and Botte Donato and northwest of Lago Ampollino. The Arvo flows into and out of the lake. The lake is a reservoir built between 1927 and 1931 by damming the Arvo. Its purpose is to generate hydroelectricity.
