= Vitravo =

Location
- Country: Italy
- Region: Calabria

Physical characteristics
- Mouth: Neto
  - coordinates: 39.1850°N 17.0846°E

Basin features
- Progression: Neto→ Gulf of Taranto

The Vitravo is a river in the Calabria region of southern Italy. The source of the river is in the province of Cosenza near the border with the province of Crotone. The river forms the border between the two provinces for a short distance before entering the province of Crotone. The Vitravo flows southeast near Verzino and Pallagorio before curving east. The river flows north of Rocca di Neto before flowing into the Neto as a left tributary shortly before the Neto flows into the Ionian Sea.
