= Trenta =

Trenta means "thirty" in some of the Romance languages, including Italian and Catalan. It may also refer to:

== Places ==
Italy

- Trenta, Italy, a comune in the province of Cosenza

Slovenia

- Trenta, Bovec, a settlement in the Slovenian Julian Alps
- Trenta (valley), a valley in the Slovenian Julian Alps

== People ==
- Elisabetta Trenta, Italian politician

== Other uses ==
- Trenta, a 31 oz. Starbucks beverage size which was introduced in 1999
