= Esaro (Cosenza) =

Location
- Country: Italy
- Region: Calabria
- Province: Cosenza

Physical characteristics
- Source: near Sant'Agata di Esaro
  - elevation: 1757 m
- Mouth: Coscile
  - coordinates: 39.7168°N 16.3066°E
- Length: 47 km (29 mi)
- Basin size: 543 km^{2} (210 sq mi)
- Discharge
  - average: 8.9 m^{3}/s (310 cu ft/s)

Basin features
- Progression: Coscile→ Crati→ Gulf of Taranto
- Tributaries
  - left: Grondo

The Esaro is a river in the province of Cosenza, Calabria, southern Italy. Its source is near Sant'Agata di Esaro. The river flows northeast near Roggiano Gravina before being joined by a left tributary, the Grondo, and a right tributary a short distance further. It then joins the Coscile as a right tributary of that river north of Spezzano Albanese, near the ancient site known as Interamnium. It is the main tributary of the Coscile.
