= Gammuto =

Gammuto is an Italian surname. It originated in the village of Longobucco, which is in the Province of Cosenza. The origins or meaning of the name are not known. Descendants of the original family can be found in the following regions of Italy:

Calabria, Piemonte, Campania, Abruzzo, Lazio, Toscana, Liguria, Piemonte, Lombardia.

== Emigrants ==
Between 1902 and 1906, members of the Gammuto family emigrated to the United States from Longobucco. Their descendants can be found in Illinois, Rhode Island, Massachusetts, Pennsylvania, and Washington. At the same time, other Gammuto family members emigrated to Argentina.
