= Stefano Lemmi =

Italian painter

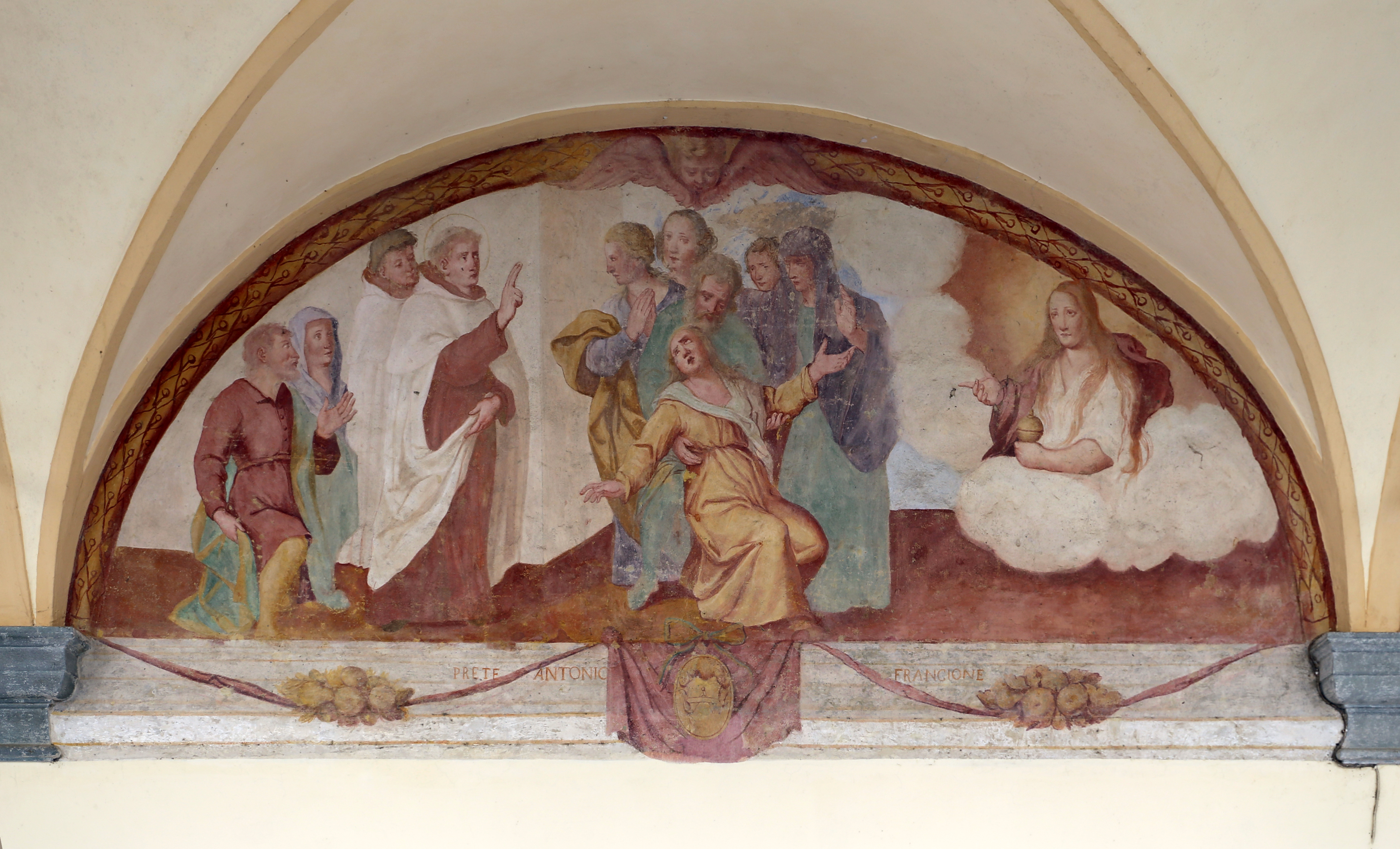
Frescoes for the Convent of the Carmine in Fivizzano

Stefano Lemmi (active 17th-century) was an Italian painter. He was born near Silano in the Lunigiana and was a pupil or follower of Guido Reni in Bologna, but painted mainly in the areas near Carrara. He painted for the castello Malaspina in Fosdinovo. He painted for the theater in Massa. He painted for the Ducal Palace of Modena under commission by Teresa Pamfilio Cybo. He painted for the church of San Francesco and other churches and monasteries in Fivizzano.
