= Interamnium =

Interamnium (Greek: Ἰντεράμνιον) – also Interamna (Ancient Greek: Ἰντέραμνα) – is an ancient Latin placename, meaning "between rivers", and may refer to:

- Interamna Lirinas, no modern successor, on the Liri River
- Interamna Nahars (or Nahartium), the modern Terni; the rivers are the Nera and the Tiber
- Interamna Praetutiana (or Interamna Praetutianorum), the modern Teramo; the rivers are the Tordino and the Vezzola
- Interamnium, Calabria, near Sezzano Albanese; at the junction of the Coscile and Esaro rivers
- Interamnium Flavium, probably in Bembibre (Motto: Interamnium Flavium); the rivers are the Boeza and the Noceda
- 704 Interamnia, an asteroid named after the town of Teramo

== See also ==
- Interamnia (disambiguation)
