= Busento =

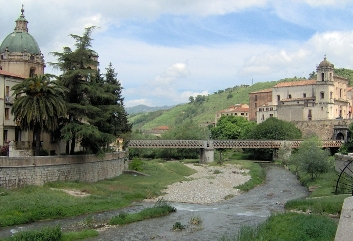
- The Busento in Cosenza's historical centre

Location
- Country: Italy

Physical characteristics
- Mouth: Crati
  - coordinates: 39.2925°N 16.259°E

Basin features
- Progression: Crati→ Gulf of Taranto

The Busento (Latin: Bucentius) is a left tributary of the Crati river, which flows about 95 kilometres (59 mi) in Calabria, southern Italy, from the Apennines to the Ionian Sea. The Busento joins the Crati in the center of Cosenza.

The legend of Alaric and his burial in the Busento inspired the poem by August von Platen-Hallermünde Das Grab im Busento with a romantic representation of the King's death and burial.

== Legend ==
The river's fame is due to a historic event in 410, when Alaric, first king of the Goths, died during a siege of the town. According to the legend, his body was buried under the river bed, the stream being temporarily diverted from its course by complex hydraulic engineering while the grave was dug and restored again to its original bed after the funeral. The work was performed by Roman slaves who were killed after the work by Alaric's soldiers so that the exact location of the burial site would remain secret forever. The king's grave and its fabulous treasure have never been found.

The German poet August von Platen-Hallermünde celebrated this event with his poem Das Grab im Busento (1820).

== See also ==
- Sack of Rome (410)
