= Pedace =

Pedace Pedàkis (Greek)
- Frazione
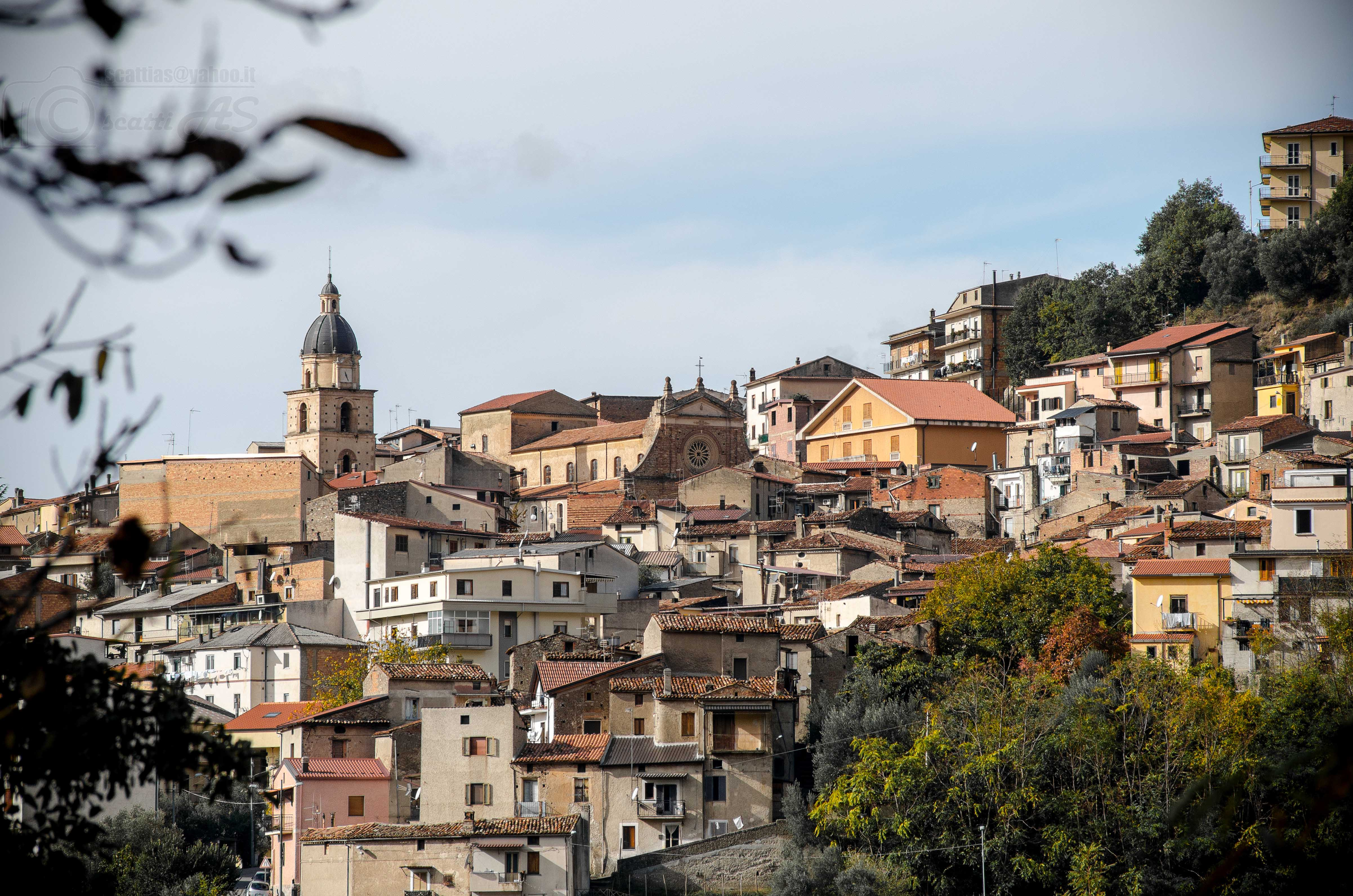

- Location of Pedace in Italy
- Coordinates: 39°16′N 16°20′E
- Country: Italy
- Region: Calabria
- Province: Cosenza (CS)
- Comune: Casali del Manco
- Elevation: 598 m (1,962 ft)

Population (2013)
  - Total: 1,964
- Demonym: Pedacesi
- Time zone: UTC+1 (CET)
  - Summer (DST): UTC+2 (CEST)
- Postal code: 87050
- Dialing code: 0984
- Patron saint: Madonna Addolorata
- Saint day: fourth Sunday in September

Pedace is a frazione in the comune of Casali del Manco, in the province of Cosenza, Calabria, southern Italy. It lost its comune status in 2017 after a referendum, along with four other municipalities.

== Geography ==
The village lies at the foot of Mount Stella, commonly known as the dialect of "Timpune e Stilla". It overlooks valley of river Cardone, extending to the Sila range.
