= Calandro River =

River in Italy

The Calandro River (Latin: Acalandrus, Ancient Greek: Ἀκάλανδρος) is a river in southern Italy. It flows into the Gulf of Taranto slightly north of Roseto Capo Spulico and approximately 10 miles (16 km) south of the mouth of the Siris (modern Sinni).

It is mentioned as a river of Lucania by both Pliny and Strabo. Pliny appears to place it north of Heraclea: however, his account is not very clear. Strabo, conversely, states distinctly that it was in the territory of Thurii. For this reason, Alexander of Epirus sought to move the general assembly of Italian Greeks, which had previously been held at Heraclea, to its banks. It was likely the boundary between the territories of Heraclea and Thurii.

A canal on Mars was named Acalandrus for this river.
