= Lago di Ariamacina =

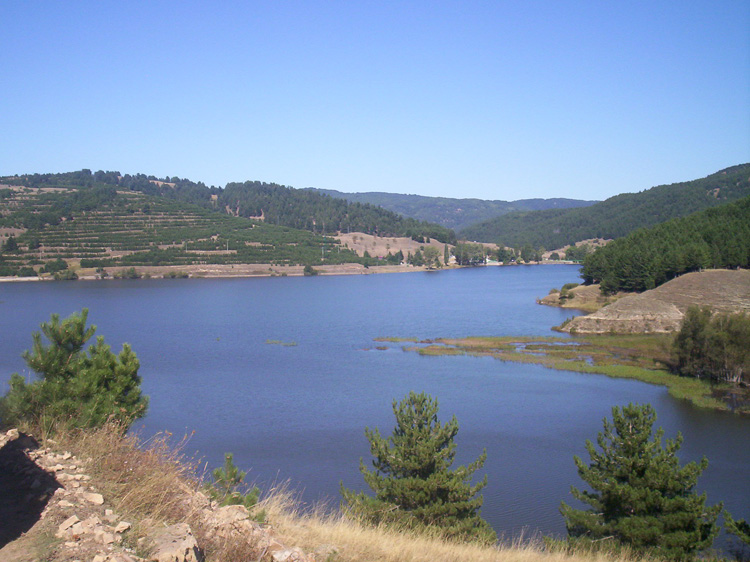

- Location in Italy
- Location: La Sila, Calabria
- Coordinates: 39°19′52″N 16°32′42″E
- Type: reservoir
- River sources: Neto
- Basin countries: Italy
- Built: 1953
- First flooded: 1955
- Surface elevation: 1,350 m (4,430 ft)

Lago di Ariamacina is a lake in the province of Cosenza, Calabria, southern Italy. It is located in the La Sila range within Sila National Park. The Neto flows into and out of the lake. The lake is a reservoir built between 1953 and 1955 by damming the Neto. Its purpose is to generate hydroelectricity. North of the lake is Lago di Cecita and south of the lake is Lago Arvo.
