= Trenta, Calabria =

Trenta
- Frazione
- Location of Trenta in Italy
- Coordinates: 39°17′N 16°19′E
- Country: Italy
- Region: Calabria
- Province: Province of Cosenza (CS)
- Comune: Casali del Manco

Area
  - Total: 4 km^{2} (1.5 sq mi)
- Elevation: 618 m (2,028 ft)

Population
  - Total: 2,616
  - Density: 650/km^{2} (1,700/sq mi)
- Time zone: UTC+1 (CET)
  - Summer (DST): UTC+2 (CEST)
- Postal code: 87050
- Dialing code: 0984

Trenta is a frazione of the comune of Casali del Manco, in the province of Cosenza, Calabria, southern Italy. It lost its comune status in 2017 after a referendum, along with four other municipalities.

Trenta is a town high in the Crati river Valley. The town's ancient name, Triginta, derives from the Latin number triginta or thirty. Trenta was founded by Cosentine refugees in the 10th century AD, in the era of Saracen occupations of the nearby capital, Magli, which eventually became one of the administrative divisions that comprise the town of Trenta. The other divisions include Schiavonea, Feruci, Cribari, Catena, and Morelli. The town itself is made up of 4.65 square kilometers (1.80 sq mi), and sits at an altitude of over 600 meters above sea level.
