= Casole Bruzio =

- Frazione
- Location of Casole Bruzio in Italy
- Coordinates: 39°17′N 16°20′E
- Country: Italy
- Region: Calabria
- Province: Cosenza (CS)
- Comune: Casali del Manco

Area
  - Total: 3 km^{2} (1.2 sq mi)
- Elevation: 647 m (2,123 ft)

Population (2007)
  - Total: 2,558
  - Density: 850/km^{2} (2,200/sq mi)
- Demonym: Casolesi
- Time zone: UTC+1 (CET)
  - Summer (DST): UTC+2 (CEST)
- Postal code: 87050
- Dialing code: 0984
- Patron saint: Santa Marina
- Saint day: 17 July

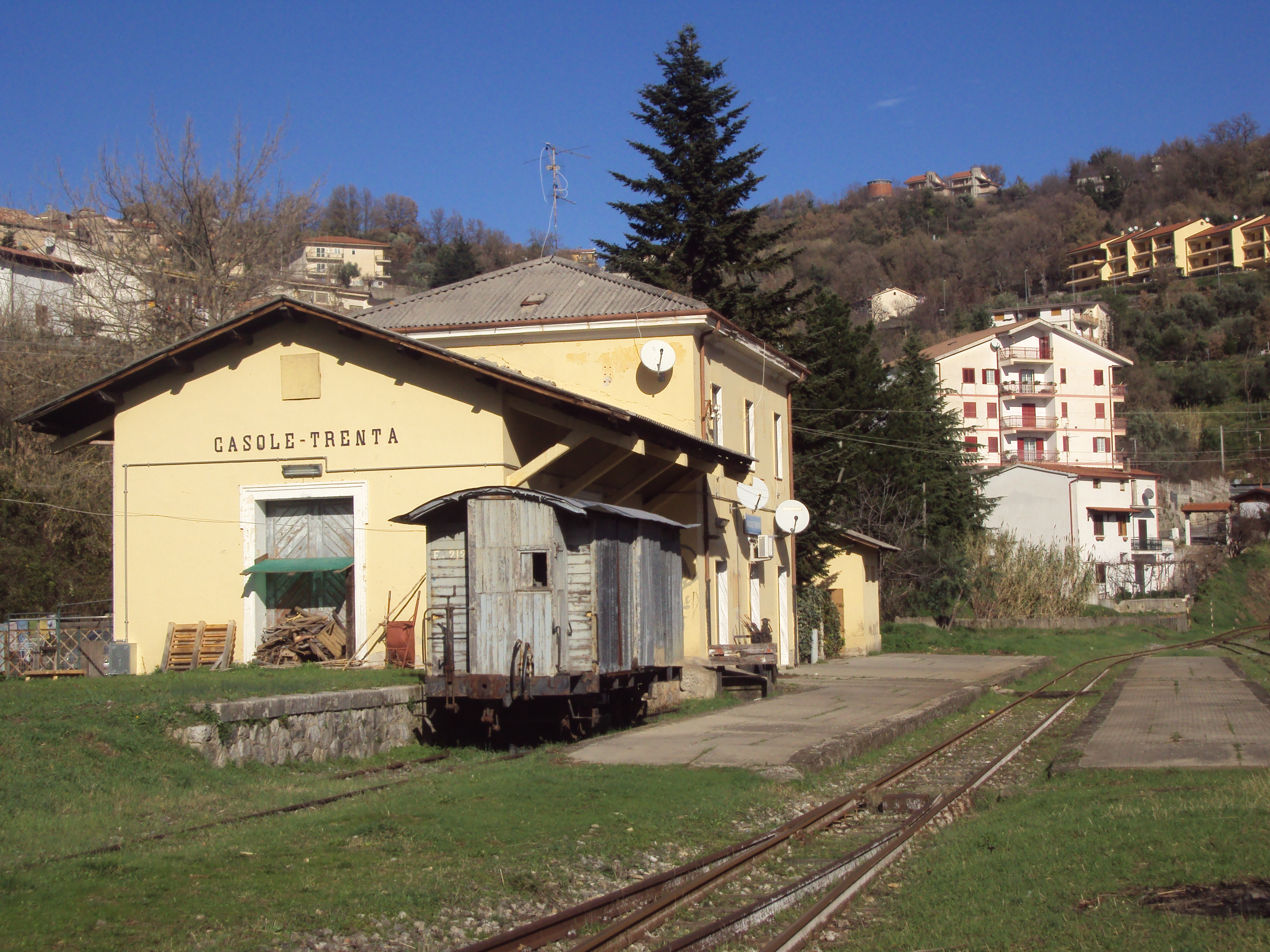
Casole railway station

Casole Bruzio is a town in the province of Cosenza in the Calabria region of southern Italy. It was a comune until 2017, when after a referendum it became a frazione of the newly formed Casali del Manco along with four other municipalities.
