= San Giovanni in Fiore Abbey =

Building in Campania, Italy

Coordinates: 39°15′21″N 16°42′05″E

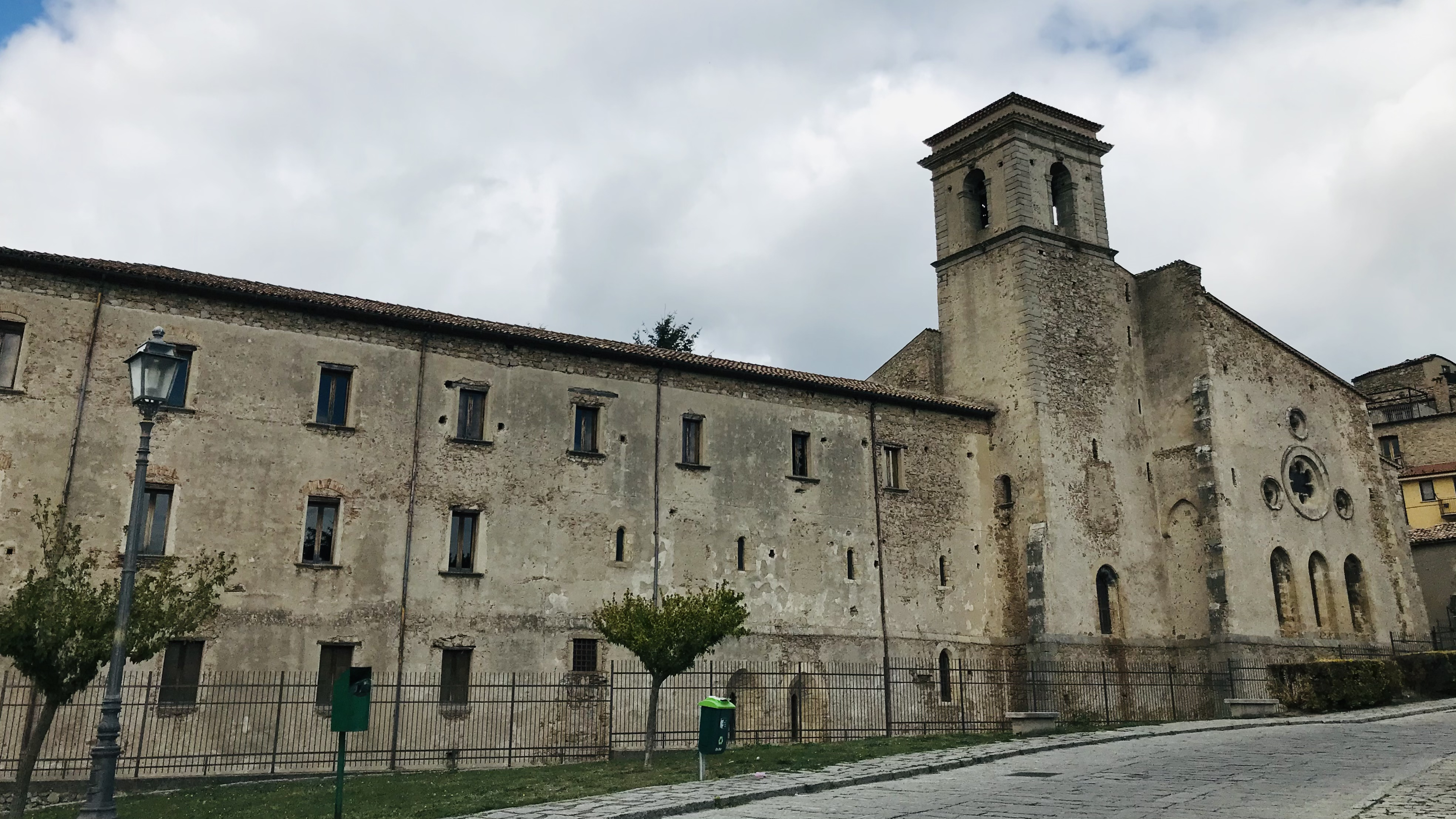
The abbey's apse and bell tower.

The San Giovanni in Fiore Abbey (Italian: Abbazia Florense) is an abbey located in the Province of Cosenza, in the Calabria region of southwestern Italy.

== History ==
=== 12th century ===
The abbey's origin date back to Joachim da Fiore's trip to La Sila in Calabria in 1188. Archaeological excavations have shown the presence of Joachim's first edifice, which was finished in 1198, in the Iure Vetere locality. The construction of the abbey was approved by Queen Constance of Hauteville after a Joachim's visit in her court at Palermo.

After Joachim's death in 1202, the first monastery and its annexed edifices were burned by a fire in 1214. The monks decided to abandon the location of Iure Vetere, also due to its difficult climatic situation.

=== 13th century ===
In 1215 a site not far from the previous one was chosen, near the Neto river valley. The new abbey was completed in 1230, in the Romanesque style. In later centuries features were remodeled in different styles, including a Baroque style church interior.

== Artwork ==
A number of drawings by Joachim of Fiore are displayed in the abbey.
