= Botte Donato =

Mountain in Italy

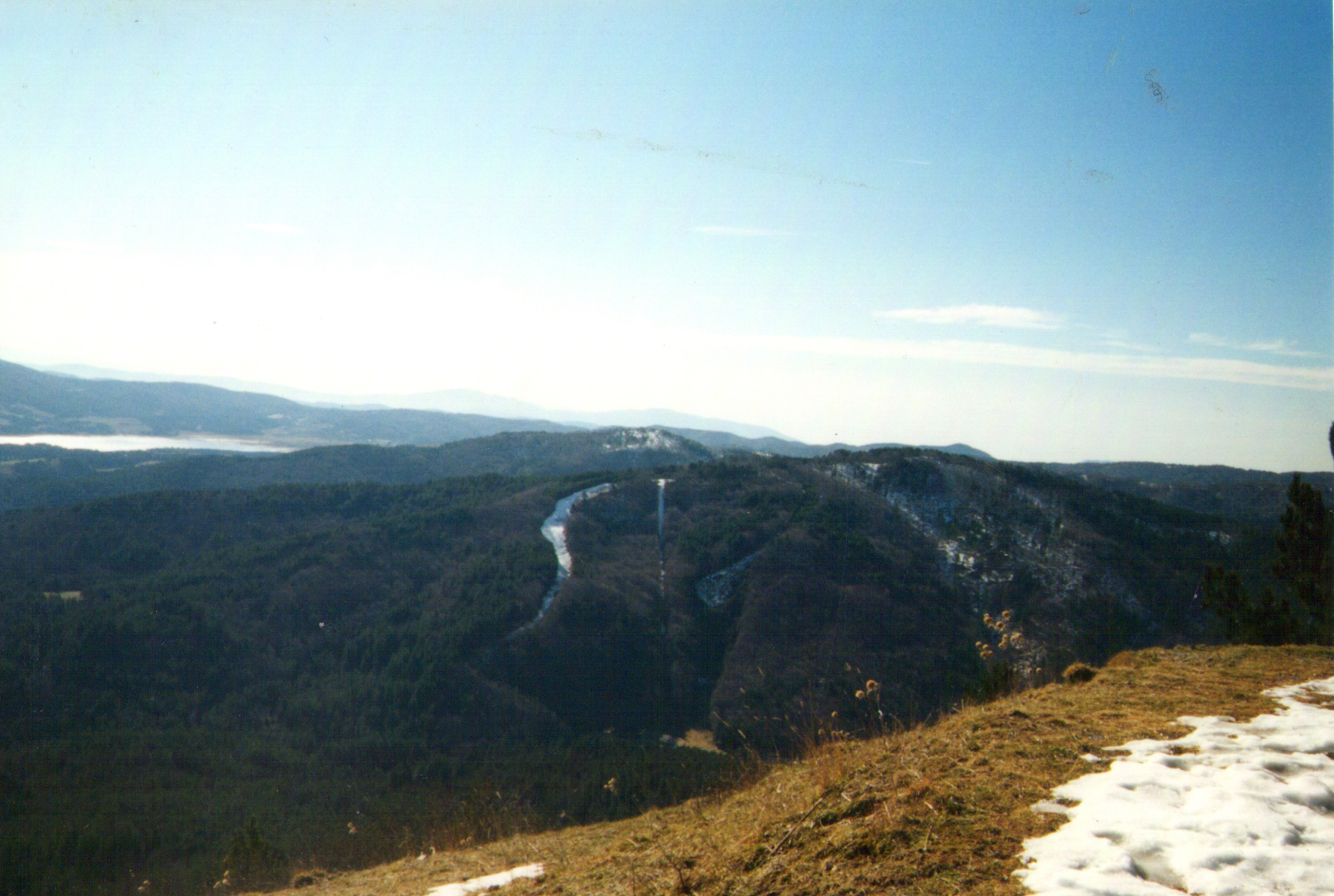

Highest point
- Elevation: 1,928 m (6,325 ft)
- Prominence: 1,307 m (4,288 ft)
- Coordinates: 39°17′05″N 16°26′50″E

Geography
- Location within Italy
- Parent range: Apennines

Botte Donato is a mountain in the Calabria region of southern Italy. It is part of the La Sila mountainous plateau (specifically the Sila Grande sub-range) and is the highest peak in the range at 1,928 meters in height. The mountain is within Sila National Park and the province of Cosenza. To the north of the mountain are the lakes Lago di Cecita and Lago di Ariamacina and to the south is the lake Lago Arvo.
