= Spezzano Piccolo =

- Frazione
- Location of Spezzano Piccolo in Italy
- Coordinates: 39°17′N 16°21′E
- Country: Italy
- Region: Calabria
- Province: Cosenza (CS)
- Comune: Casali del Manco

Area
  - Total: 48 km^{2} (19 sq mi)
- Elevation: 700 m (2,300 ft)

Population
  - Total: 2,030
  - Density: 42/km^{2} (110/sq mi)
- Demonym: Spezzanupicculari
- Time zone: UTC+1 (CET)
  - Summer (DST): UTC+2 (CEST)
- Postal code: 87050
- Dialing code: 0984
- Patron saint: Madonna dell'Assunta
- Saint day: 15 August

Spezzano Piccolo is a town and former comune in the province of Cosenza in the Calabria region of southern Italy. It lost its comune status in 2017 after a referendum, becoming part of the newly formed Casali del Manco, along with four other municipalities. It was the only one of the five municipalities in which voters expressed themselves unfavourably towards the proposed change.
