= Spezzano della Sila =

- Comune
- Comune di Spezzano della Sila
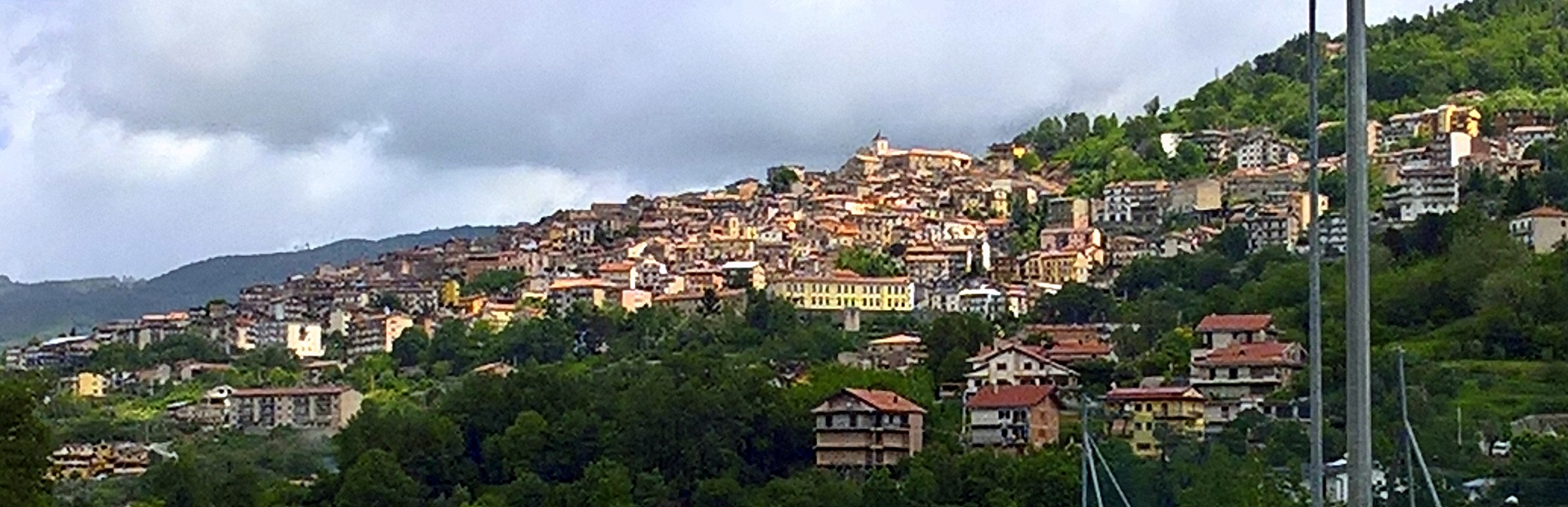

- Location within Italy Location within Calabria
- Coordinates: 39°18′N 16°21′E
- Country: Italy
- Region: Calabria
- Province: Cosenza (CS)
- Frazioni: Camigliatello Silano

Government
  - Mayor: Salvatore Monaco

Area
  - Total: 80.29 km^{2} (31.00 sq mi)
- Elevation: 783 m (2,569 ft)

Population (31 December 2010)
  - Total: 4,688
  - Density: 58.39/km^{2} (151.2/sq mi)
- Demonym: Spezzanesi or Silani
- Time zone: UTC+1 (CET)
  - Summer (DST): UTC+2 (CEST)
- Postal code: 87058
- Dialing code: 0984
- Patron saint: Saint Blaise
- Saint day: 3 February
- Website: Official website

Spezzano della Sila (Calabrian: Spezzànu or Spezzànu Rànnë) is a town and comune in the province of Cosenza, in the Calabria region of southern Italy.

The town is bordered by Casali del Manco, Celico, Longobucco and Rovito.
