= Serra Pedace =

- Frazione
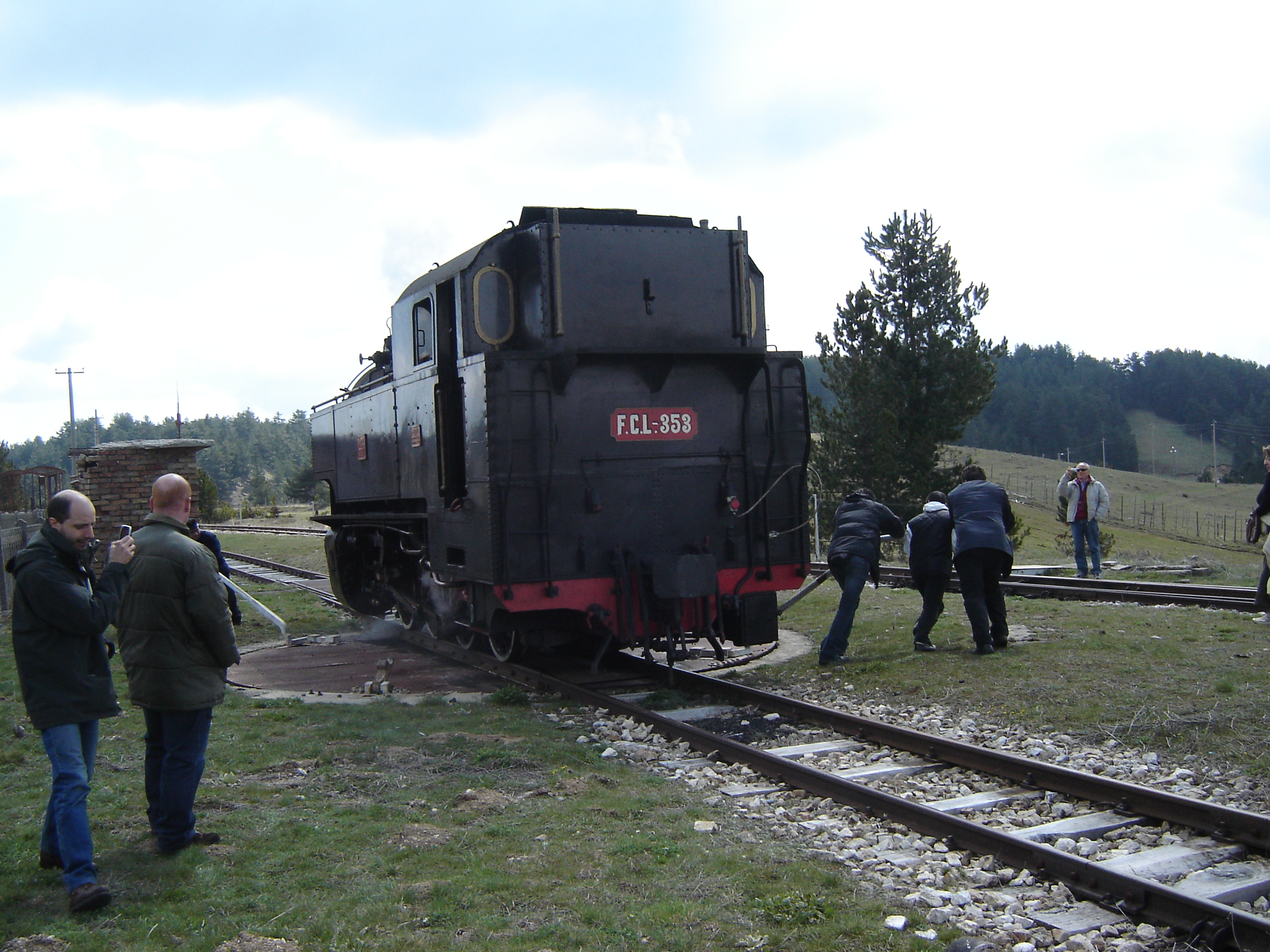
- FCL 353 locomotive at San Nicola-Silvana Mansio train station

- Location of Serra Pedace in Italy
- Coordinates: 39°17′N 16°21′E
- Country: Italy
- Region: Calabria
- Province: Cosenza (CS)
- Comune: Casali del Manco

Area
  - Total: 59 km^{2} (23 sq mi)
- Elevation: 726 m (2,382 ft)

Population (2007)
  - Total: 1,050
  - Density: 18/km^{2} (46/sq mi)
- Demonym: Serritani
- Time zone: UTC+1 (CET)
  - Summer (DST): UTC+2 (CEST)
- Postal code: 87050
- Dialing code: 0984
- Patron saint: San Donato Vescovo
- Saint day: 7 August

Serra Pedace is a frazione of the comune of Casali del Manco in the province of Cosenza, Calabria, southern Italy. It lost its comune status in 2017 after a referendum, along with four other municipalities.
