= Silano =

Silano is a surname of Italian origin. Notable persons with that surname include:

- Lena Silano (born 2000), American professional soccer player
- Rocco Silano (born 1960), American magician, author, and lecturer

== See also ==
- Sila (disambiguation)
