= Longobucco =

- Comune
- Comune di Longobucco
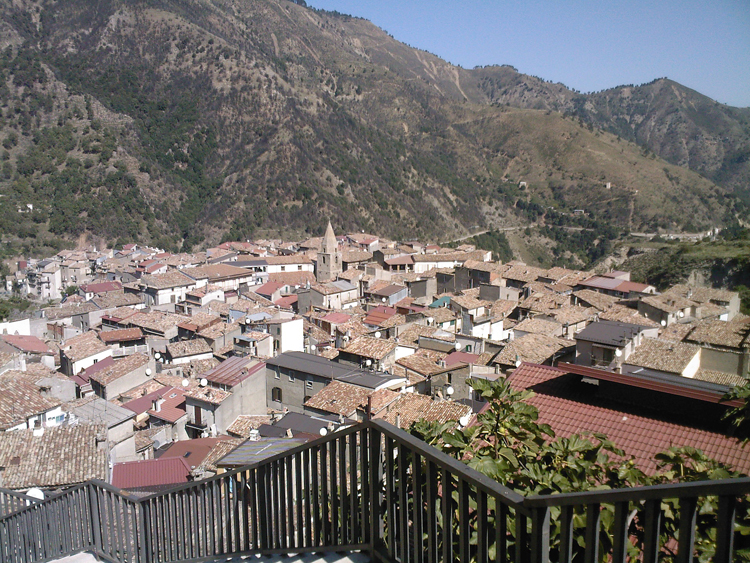

- Coat of arms

- Location within Italy Location within Calabria
- Coordinates: 39°26′53″N 16°36′40″E
- Country: Italy
- Region: Calabria
- Province: Cosenza (CS)
- Frazioni: Destro, Ortiano, Manco, Cava di Melis, San Pietro in Angaro

Government
  - Mayor: Giovanni Pirillo

Area
  - Total: 212.26 km^{2} (81.95 sq mi)
- Elevation: 800 m (2,600 ft)

Population (31 May 2010)
  - Total: 3,694
  - Density: 17.40/km^{2} (45.07/sq mi)
- Demonym: Longobucchesi
- Time zone: UTC+1 (CET)
  - Summer (DST): UTC+2 (CEST)
- Postal code: 87066
- Dialing code: 0983
- Patron saint: St. Dominic
- Saint day: 4 August
- Website: Official website

Longobucco (Sicilian: Longuvuccu) is a town and comune in the province of Cosenza, in the Calabria region of southern Italy. Longobucco is one of the main municipalities of the Sila National Park and in terms of its territory is one of the largest in Calabria. It is a small town in the heart of Sila Greca, part of the Greater Sila Plateau, in the midst of mountains, rivers and lakes that are home to numerous species of animals and plants.

== Twin towns ==
- Signa, Italy
- Luzzi, Italy
