= Casali del Manco =

- Comune
- Comune di Casali del Manco
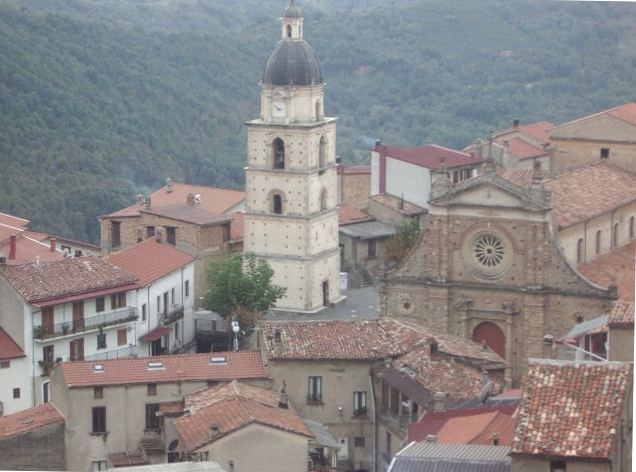
- View of Pedace, one of the towns composing Casali del Manco

- Location within Italy Location within Calabria
- Coordinates: 39°17′15.27″N 16°20′22.83″E
- Country: Italy
- Region: Calabria
- Province: Cosenza (CS)

Government
  - Mayor: Stanislao Martire

Area
  - Total: 168.95 km^{2} (65.23 sq mi)
- Highest elevation: 645 m (2,116 ft)
- Lowest elevation: 617 m (2,024 ft)

Population (2017)
  - Total: 10,073
  - Density: 59.621/km^{2} (154.42/sq mi)
- Demonym: casalini
- Time zone: UTC+1 (CET)
  - Summer (DST): UTC+2 (CEST)
- Postal code: 87050
- Dialing code: 0984
- Website: Official website

Casali del Manco is a town and comune of the province of Cosenza in the Calabria region of southern Italy, located east of Cosenza. It was formed in May 2017 from the union of five previous municipalities, Casole Bruzio, Pedace, Serra Pedace, Spezzano Piccolo and Trenta. It was established following a referendum held on 26 March 2017. In Spezzano Piccolo voters expressed themselves against the proposed union, but this was not enough to retain the status of comune.
