= Spezzano Albanese =

- Comune
- Comune di Spezzano Albanese; Bashkia e Spixanit
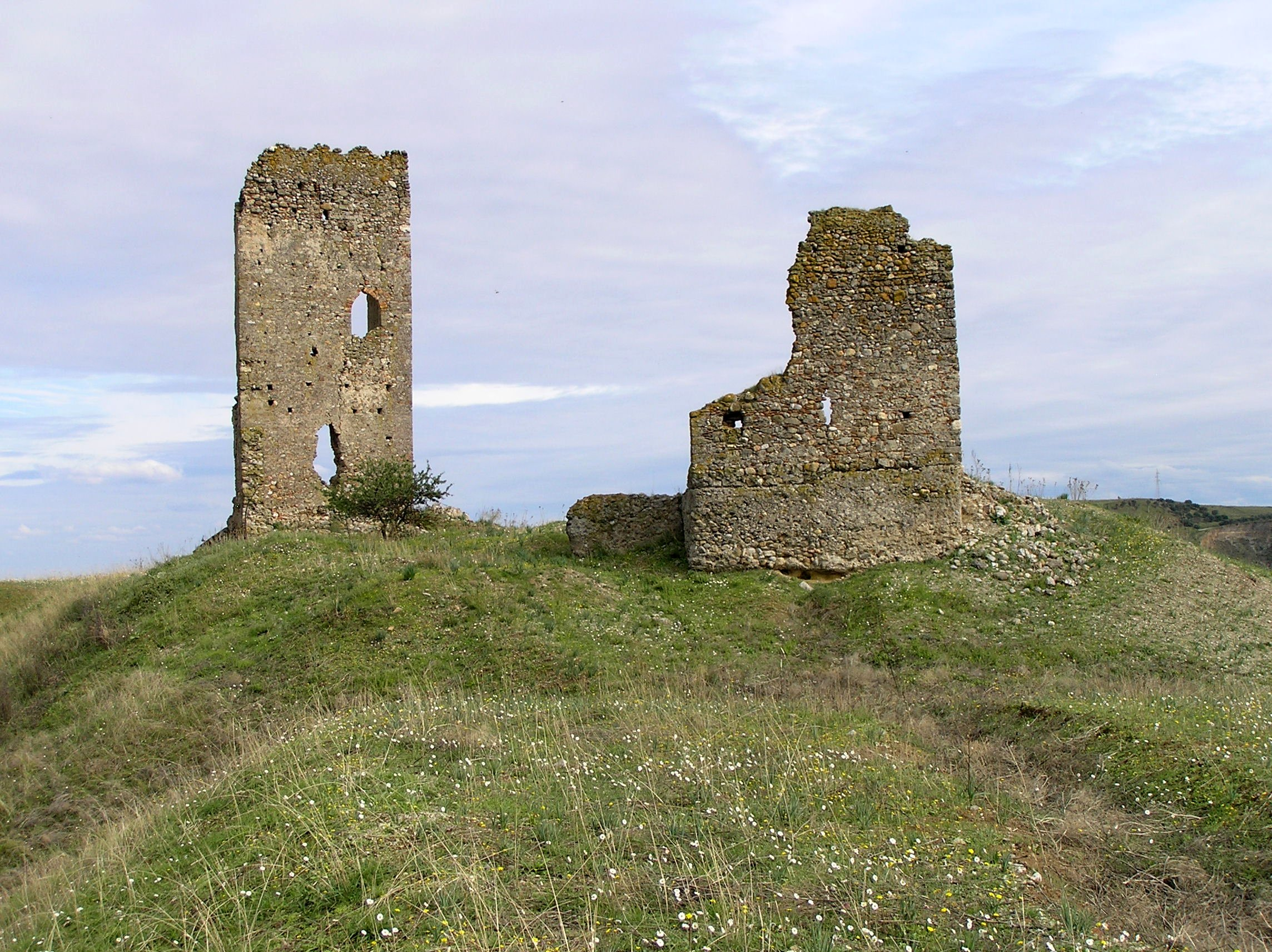
- Remains of the castle.

- Coat of arms

- Location within Italy Location within Calabria
- Coordinates: 39°40′N 16°19′E
- Country: Italy
- Region: Calabria
- Province: Cosenza (CS)

Government
  - Mayor: Ferdinando Nociti

Area
  - Total: 32.26 km^{2} (12.46 sq mi)
- Elevation: 320 m (1,050 ft)

Population (30 June 2012)
  - Total: 7,217
  - Density: 223.7/km^{2} (579.4/sq mi)
- Demonym: Spezzanesi
- Time zone: UTC+1 (CET)
  - Summer (DST): UTC+2 (CEST)
- Postal code: 87019
- Dialing code: 0981
- Patron saint: Our Lady of the Graces (Madonna delle Grazie)
- Saint day: First Tuesday after the Easter
- Website: Official website

Spezzano Albanese (Arbëreshë: Spixan) is a municipality in the province of Cosenza, Calabria, southern Italy.

It is located on a 320 m high hill commanding the plain of Sibari and the Esaro river valley. It originated from Albanian emigration in the 15th century. Sights include the archaeological site of Torre del Mordillo, whose excavated Bronze Age remains and a necropolis dating from the 18th century BC up to the early Hellenistic Age; the Torre Scribla, what remains of a Norman fortress originally including two towers, which was the first residence / Fief of Robert Guiscard the future Duke of Calabria and Puglia, on his arrival in Calabria; and the Sanctuary of Madonna delle Grazie, a Catholic church from the 16th century.

== Sources ==
- Serra, Alessandro (1987). Spezzano Albanese nelle vicende storiche sue e dell'Italia (1470 - 1945). Spezzano Albanese: Edizioni Trimograf.
