= Crati =

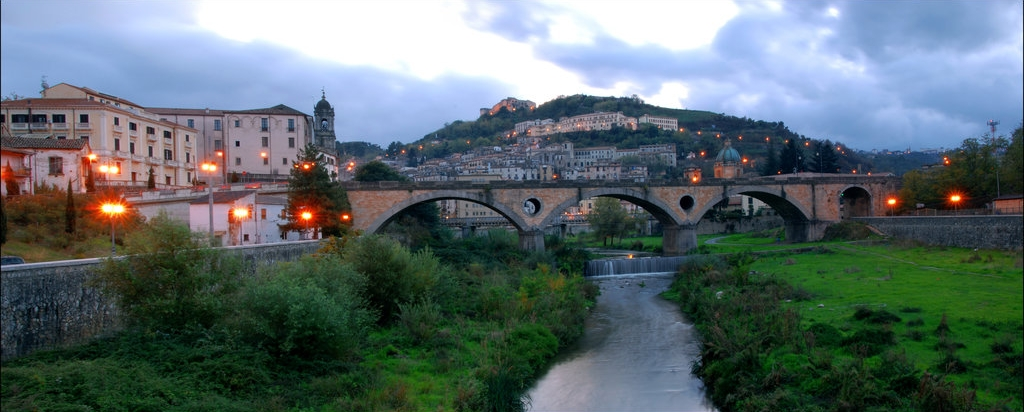
- The Crati at Cosenza

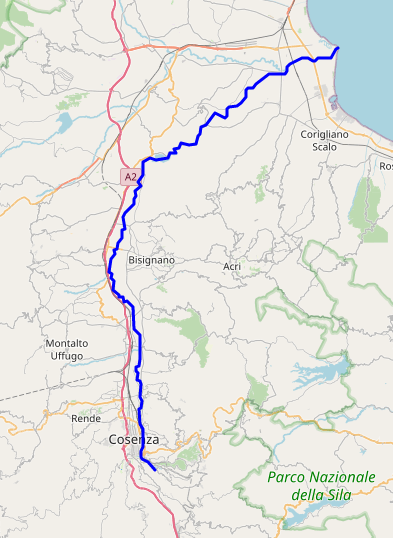

Location
- Country: Italy
- Region: Calabria

Physical characteristics
- Source: Sila Mountains
  - elevation: 1,742 m (5,715 ft)
- Mouth: Gulf of Taranto
  - location: Laghi di Sibari
  - coordinates: 39°43′25″N 16°31′45″E
  - elevation: 0 m (0 ft)
- Length: 91 km (57 mi)
- Basin size: 2,448 km^{2} (945 sq mi)
- Discharge
  - average: 36 m^{3}/s (1,300 cu ft/s)

Basin features
- Tributaries
  - left: Busento, Coscile
  - right: Arente, Mucone, Duglia

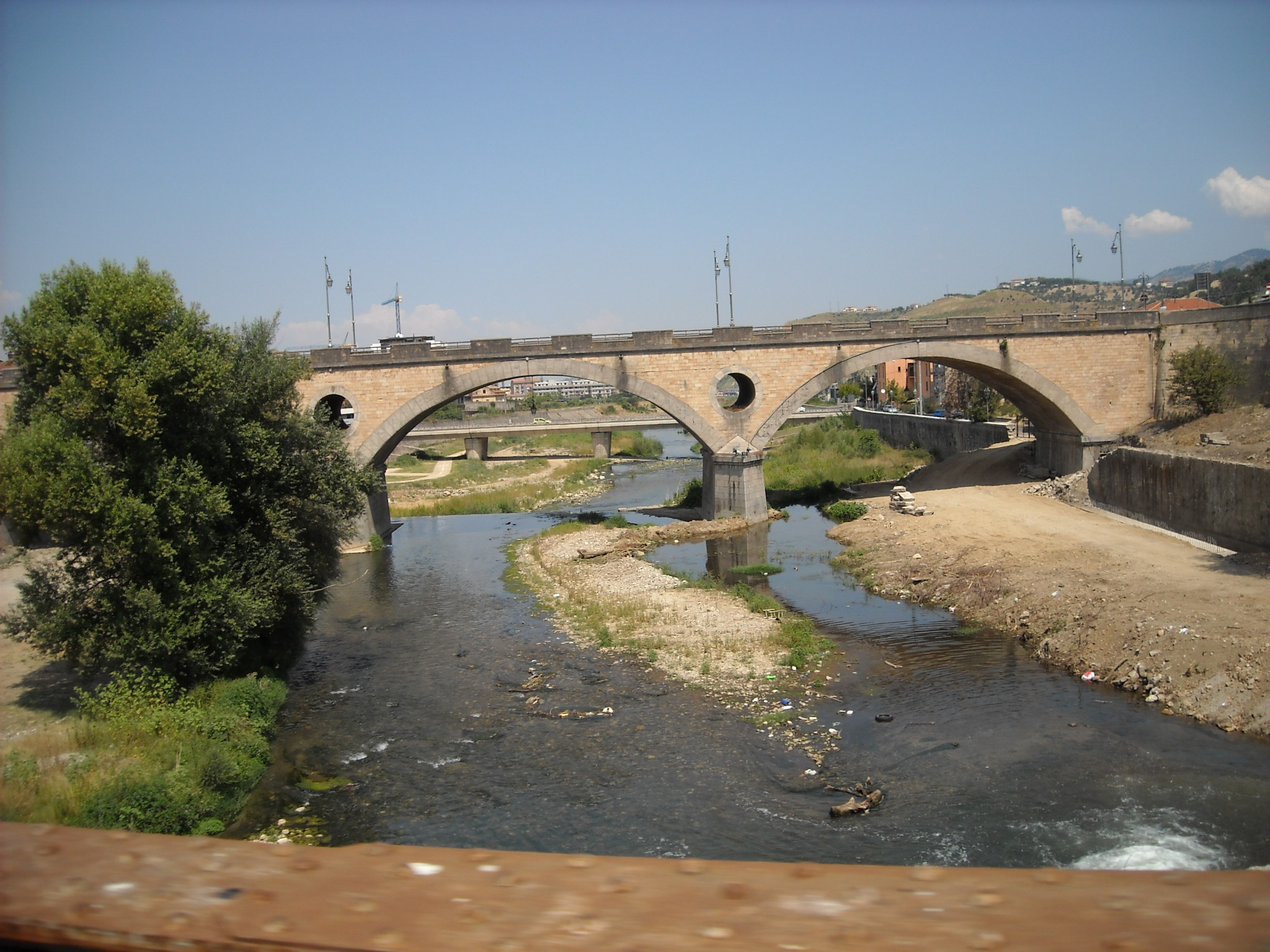
The Crati at its confluence with the Busento river near the center of Cosenza

The Crati is a river in Calabria, southern Italy. It is the largest river of Calabria and the third largest river of southern Italy after the Volturno and the Sele. In classical antiquity it was known as the Crathis or Crater (Greek: Κρᾶθις).

== Geography ==
The Crati rises in the central Sila Mountains in the comune Aprigliano. It starts at as the Craticello at an elevation of 1,742 meters. It descends very steeply northward towards Cosenza where it is joined on the left by the Busento river, doubling in size. From here on it flows through a large plain, the Vallo del Crati. Here it is joined by several tributaries from the right: the Arente, Mucone (its main tributary on the right) and Duglia rivers. Several smaller streams also join it on the right: the Finita, Turbolo, Cucchiato, Campagnano, Mavigliano and Settimo. The river is also joined by several left tributaries including the Annea. It has a drainage basin of 2,448 square kilometres (945 sq mi).

With a discharge of 20 m^{3}/s it continues to Tarsia where a dam forms an artificial lake of the same name. From here it changes course to the northeast and meets with the Coscile river approximately five kilometers from the Gulf of Taranto. The Coscile is its main tributary on the left which again doubles the river in size. It continues eastwards, passing immediately south of the archaeological site of Sybaris and Thurii. Its mouth is near the marina of the comune Corigliano-Rossano.

== Hydrology ==
The Crati is the largest river in the region in terms of discharge, both as an annual average (about 36 m^{3}/s), minimum (about 10 m^{3}/s) and maximum (more than 3,000 m^{3}/s). The river is very seasonal and can sometimes bring disastrous winter floods, which happened most recently in December 2008.

== History ==
Because of its close proximity to the famous ancient city of Sybaris the Crati was noticed by many ancient writers. Lycophron and Theocritus mention the river in their poetry. Euripides praises the river and alleges that it would change the color of the hair to auburn. Others mention different colors and Pliny the Elder writes that it would make sheep white. According to Strabo the river received its name because it was a mixture, just like the Krathis river in Achaea. Pausanias and Herodotus also mention it, but state that the river was named after the Krathis river.

Strabo also claims that the Croton diverted the course of the Crathis to submerge Sybaris. Research has not confirmed this. The Crati transports coarse sand and pebbles in its channel. If Strabo's claim is true, that material would have been deposited as sediment above the city when the river submerged it. An analysis of core samples taken from the site of Sybaris by Stanley and Bernasconi did not find such river deposits directly above the former city. Future retrieval of additional cores and facies analysis will eventually confirm or discredit Strabo's account.

In the time of Sybaris the Coscile was not a tributary of the Crati but pursued a direct course to the Gulf of Taranto. It probably followed a course at a short distance to the north of Sybaris.
