= San Giovanni in Fiore =

- Comune
- Comune di San Giovanni in Fiore
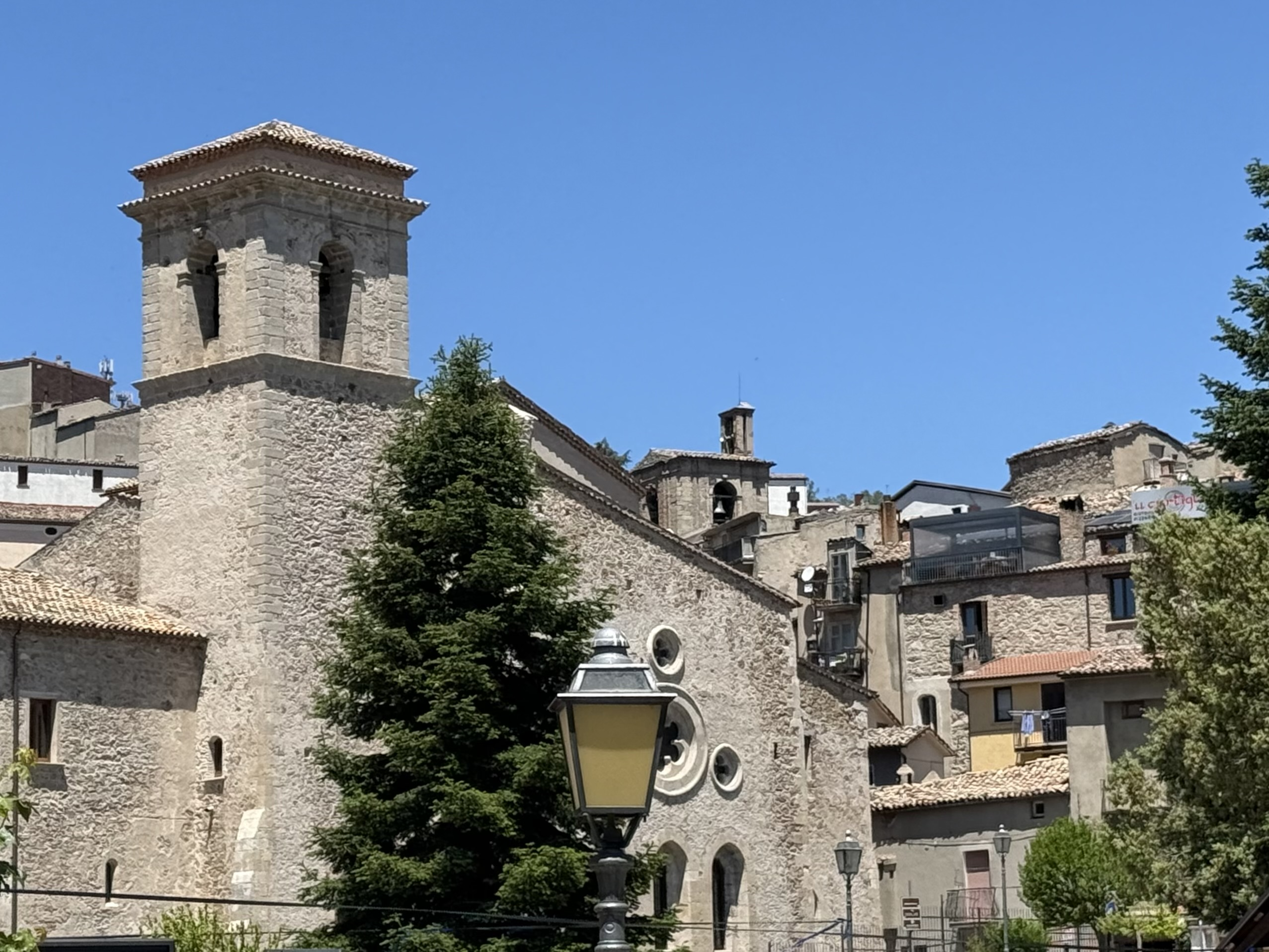

- Coat of arms

- Location within Italy Location within Calabria
- Coordinates: 39°16′N 16°42′E
- Country: Italy
- Region: Calabria
- Province: Cosenza (CS)
- Frazioni: Fantino, Carello, Lorica, Rovale, Serrisi, Acquafredda, Cagno, Ceraso, Germano, Palla Palla, Torre Garga

Government
  - Mayor: Rosaria Succurro (Forza Italia)

Area
  - Total: 279.45 km^{2} (107.90 sq mi)
- Elevation: 1,049 m (3,442 ft)

Population (November 2008)
  - Total: 18,184
  - Density: 65.071/km^{2} (168.53/sq mi)
- Demonym: Sangiovannesi
- Time zone: UTC+1 (CET)
  - Summer (DST): UTC+2 (CEST)
- Postal code: 87055
- Dialing code: 0984
- Patron saint: St. John the Baptist
- Saint day: 24 June
- Website: Official website

San Giovanni in Fiore (Italian pronunciation: [san dʒoˈvanni iɱ ˈfjoːre]; Calabrian: Sangiuvanni [sandʒuˈvanni]) is a town and comune in the province of Cosenza in the Calabria region of southern Italy.

The town originates from the Florense Abbey, built here by the Calabrian monk Joachim of Fiore in 1188.

Marjorie Reeves of Oxford University was made an honorary citizen of San Giovanni for reviving interest in Joachim of Fiore.
