= Sila National Park =

Italian national park

Parco Nazionale della Sila
- IUCN category II (national park)
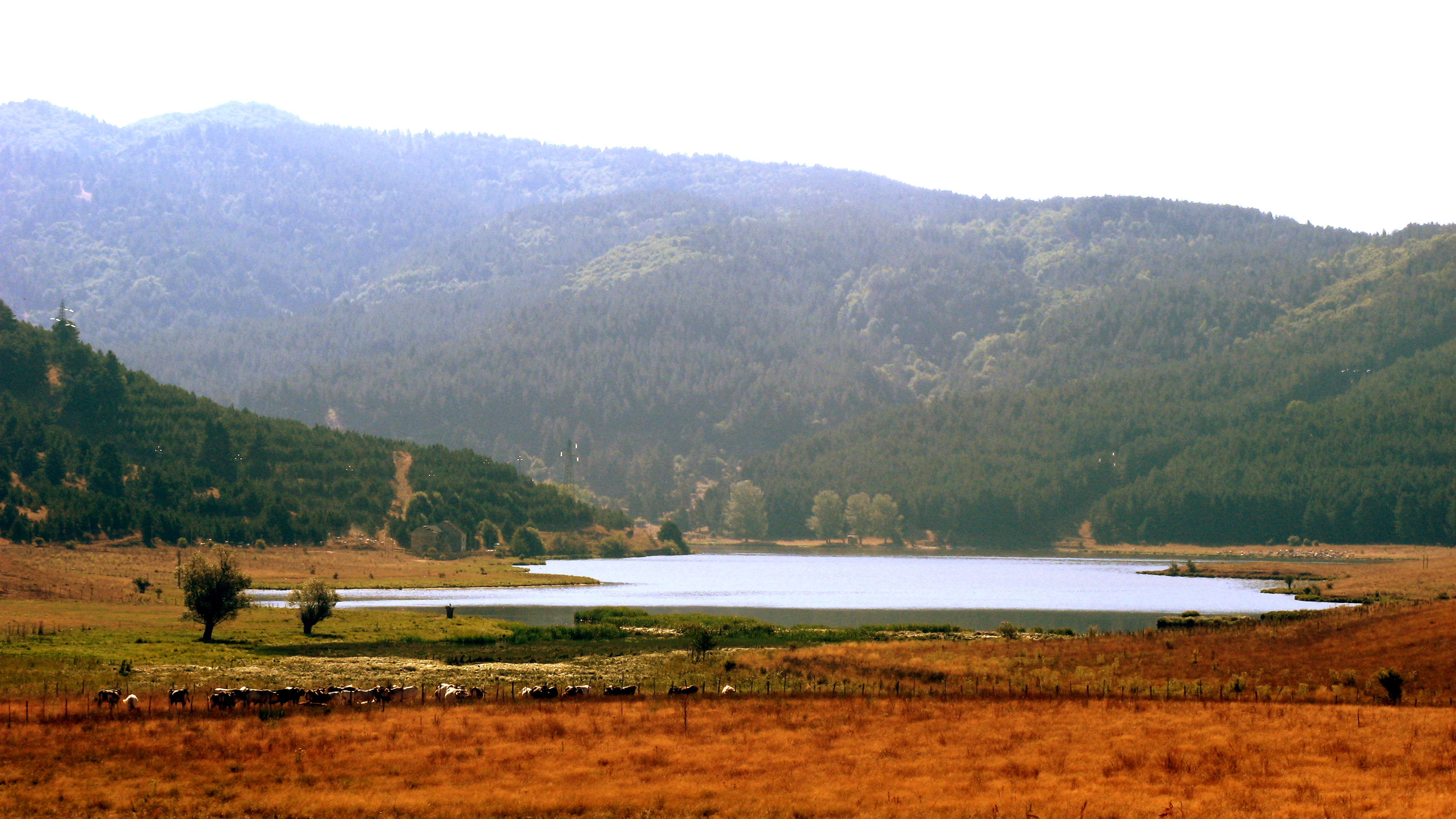
- Lago di Ariamacina, Sila National Park

- Location within Italy
- Location: Calabria
- Nearest city: Crotone
- Coordinates: 39°22′34″N 16°35′31″E
- Area: 736.95 km^{2} (284.54 sq mi)
- Established: 2002; 24 years ago
- Governing body: Ministry of the Environment
- Website: parcosila.it

Sila National Park (Italian: Parco nazionale della Sila) is an Italian national park in Calabria, located on the Sila Plateau. It was established in 1997 and covers about 74,000 hectares (180,000 acres). Its highest mountains are Mt. Botte Donato (1,928 m), in Sila Grande, and Mt. Gariglione (1,764 m) in Sila Piccola. The park was established with the Regional Decree of 14 November 2002 and includes its own management agency. The park includes the territories formerly part of the Calabria National Park (1968), and protects areas of great environmental interest in Sila Piccola, Sila Grande and Sila Greca, for a total of 736.95 square kilometres (284.54 sq mi), in 21 municipalities (comuni) and 6 "mountain communities" (comunità montane) across the three Calabrian provinces of Catanzaro, Cosenza and Crotone.

== See also ==
- Lake Passante
