= La Sila =

Mountain plateau in Calabria, Italy

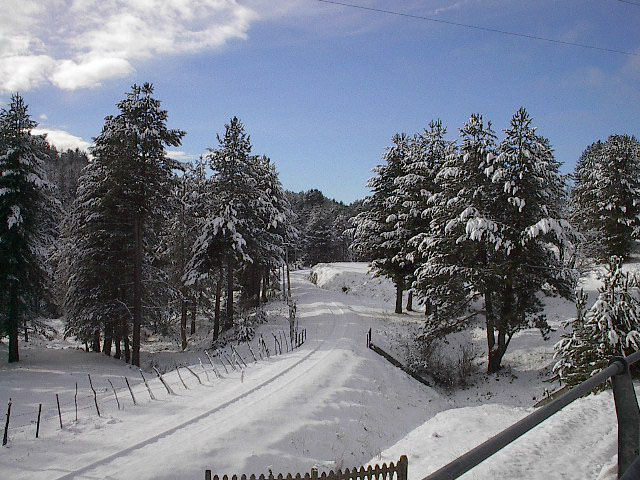
- Sila National Park

Highest point
- Peak: Botte Donato
- Elevation: 1,928 m (6,325 ft)
- Prominence: 1,312 m (4,304 ft)
- Listing: Ribu
- Coordinates: 39°17′5.02″N 16°26′49.53″E

Geography
- Country: Italy
- Region: Calabria
- Provinces: Cosenza, Crotone and Catanzaro
- Range coordinates: 39°22′N 16°30′E

La Sila, also simply Sila, is the name of the mountainous plateau and historic region located in Calabria, southern Italy. The Sila National Park is known to have the purest air in Europe.

== Geography ==
The Sila occupies part of the provinces of Cosenza, Crotone and Catanzaro, and is divided (from north to south) into the sub-ranges Sila Greca, Sila Grande and Sila Piccola ("Greek", "Greater" and "Lesser Sila", respectively). The highest peaks are the Botte Donato (1,928 m), in the Sila Grande, and Monte Gariglione (1,764 m) in the Sila Piccola.

The Sila Greca is the northernmost section and is now mostly cultivated rather than thick woods. Around this area, Albanian villages such as San Demetrio Corone sprang up when Albanians were fleeing the wrath of Muslim invaders.

The Sila houses the eponymous national park, the Parco Nazionale della Sila, formerly called National Park of Calabria; it was created in 2002.

The pine tree Pinus nigra ssp. laricio, commonly called Corsican pine is native to the Sila. Virgil, Thucydides, Strabo, Cassiodorus report the vast expanses of pines in the Sila.

=== Geology ===
Geologically these mountains, which consist of granite, gneiss and mica schist, are the oldest portion of the Italian peninsula; their culminating point is the Botte Donato (6330 ft), and they are not free of snow until the late spring.

== History ==
The name goes back to the Greek period, and then probably belonged to a larger extension of territory than at present. In ancient times these mountains supplied timber to the Greeks for shipbuilding.

The first known settlers of the Sila plateau were the Bruttii, an ancient tribe of shepherds and farmers. Rome began to extend its sphere of influence over Calabria, Sila included, to the extent that any outside rule affected these mountains. Later it was nominally occupied in turn by the Ostrogoths, the Byzantines and, from the 11th century, the Italo-Normans. The last favoured the creation of several monasteries, such as Santa Maria della Matina of San Marco Argentano, Sambucina at Luzzi and Florense Abbey at San Giovanni in Fiore, founded by Joachim of Fiore.

In 1448-1535 immigrants from Albania settled the area towards the Ionian Sea, creating the communities of Sila Greca ("Greek Sila").

After the annexation to the Kingdom of Italy (late 19th century), Sila remained a base of brigandage. New routes were opened to reduce the isolation of the mountain centres, which was dramatic especially in winter: these included the Paola-Cosenza-Crotone road, and specialised mountain railways such as the Cosenza-Camigliatello Silano-San Giovanni in Fiore narrow-gauge line (now operating only for tourist special excursions), operated by the Ferrovie Calabro Lucane, and the Paola-Cosenza rack railway, operated by Ferrovie dello Stato.

In 1915, the British traveller Norman Douglas, author of the travelogue "Old Calabria", wrote about the Sila as "... a venerable granite plateau, which stood here when the proud Apennines were still dozing on the oozy bed of the ocean...".

The 1949 film The Wolf of the Sila was set in the area, and much of it was shot on location.

Today several centres, such as Camigliatello and Palumbo Sila, are becoming tourist resorts.

On 18 July 1980, a MIG-23MS was found at the Sila Mountains. It was said that the autopilot was on for hours and the plane ran out of fuel. The pilot was suspected to have hypoxia.
