= Gulf of Taranto =

Bay of the Ionian Sea, in Southern Italy

- Golfo di Taranto (Italian); Gurfe de Tarde (Neapolitan); Gulfu di Tàrantu (Sicilian)
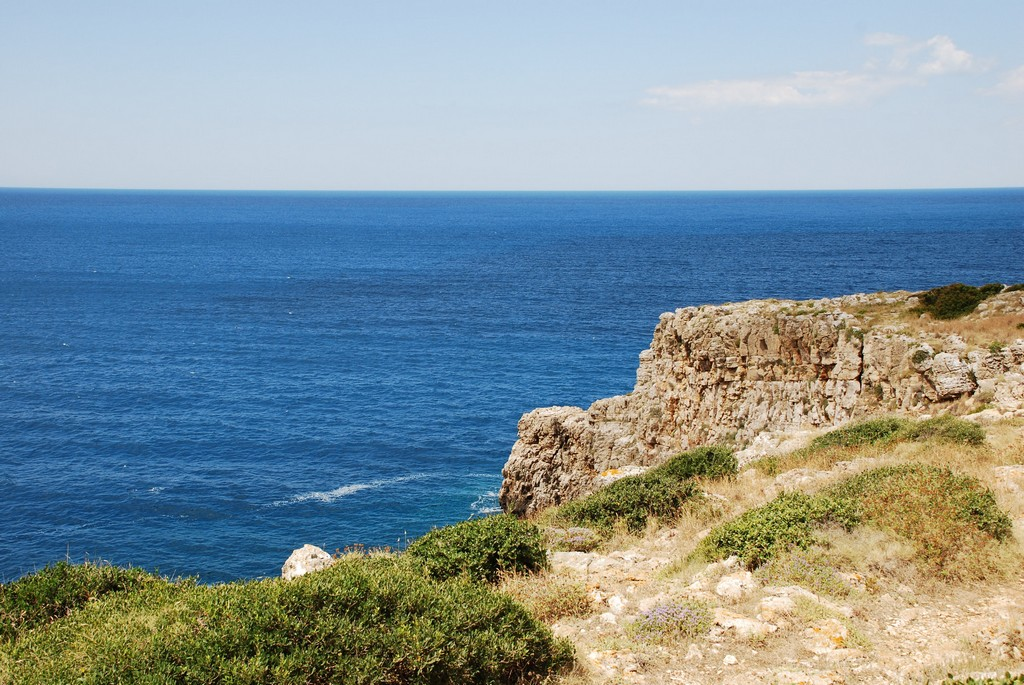
- Gulf of Taranto in Lecce province
- Interactive map of Gulf of Taranto
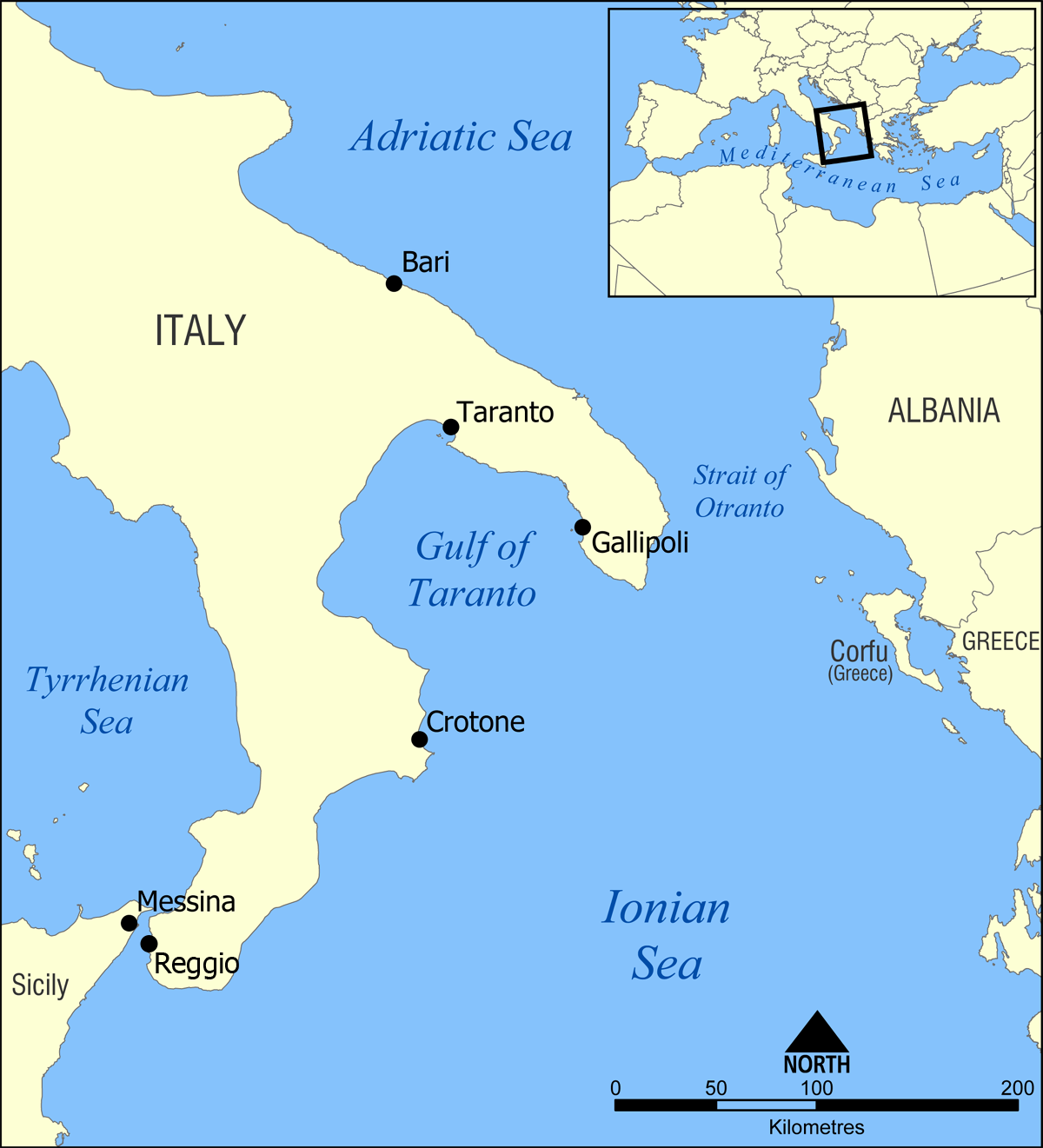
- Map of the Gulf of Taranto
- Coordinates: 39°53′06″N 17°16′37″E
- Type: gulf
- Etymology: after the city of Taranto
- Part of: Ionian Sea
- Primary inflows: Agri, Basento, Sinni, Calandro River
- Primary outflows: Mediterranean Sea
- Basin countries: Italy
- Islands: Cheradi
- Settlements: Taranto, Gallipoli, Crotone

The Gulf of Taranto (Italian: Golfo di Taranto; Tarantino: Gurfe de Tarde; Latin: Sinus Tarentinus) is a gulf of the Ionian Sea, in Southern Italy.

The Gulf of Taranto is almost square, 140 km (87 mi) long and wide, making it the largest gulf in Italy, and it is delimited by the capes Santa Maria di Leuca (to the east, in Apulia) and Colonna (the ancient Lacinium, to the west, in Calabria), encompassed by the three regions of Apulia, Basilicata and Calabria. The most important rivers are the Basento, the Sinni, and the Agri.

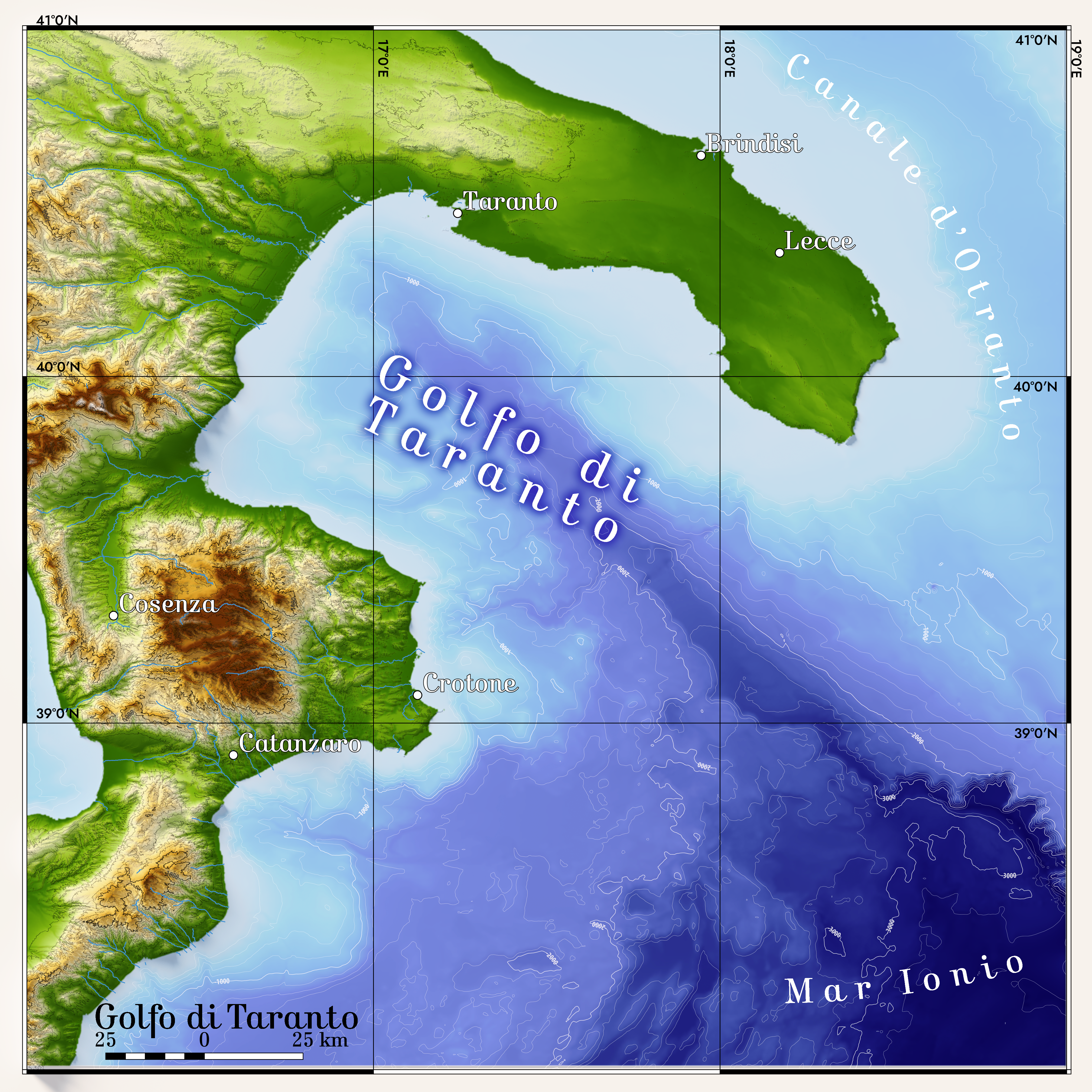
Topographic map of the Gulf of Tarent

The main cities on the gulf are Taranto and Gallipoli. The Greek colonies (Magna Graecia) of Kroton, Heraclea, Thurii, and Sybaris were also founded here.

Italy claims the whole gulf as national waters, thus closed to international traffic. This position, which is similar to that of Libya on the Gulf of Sidra, is not recognized by some other countries, such as the United States and the United Kingdom.
