= Archdiocese of Rossano-Cariati =

Latin Catholic archdiocese in Italy

Coordinates: 39.5750°N 16.6353°E

Archdiocese of Rossano-Cariati Archidioecesis Rossanensis-Cariatensis Arcidiocesi di Rossano-Cariati

Catholic
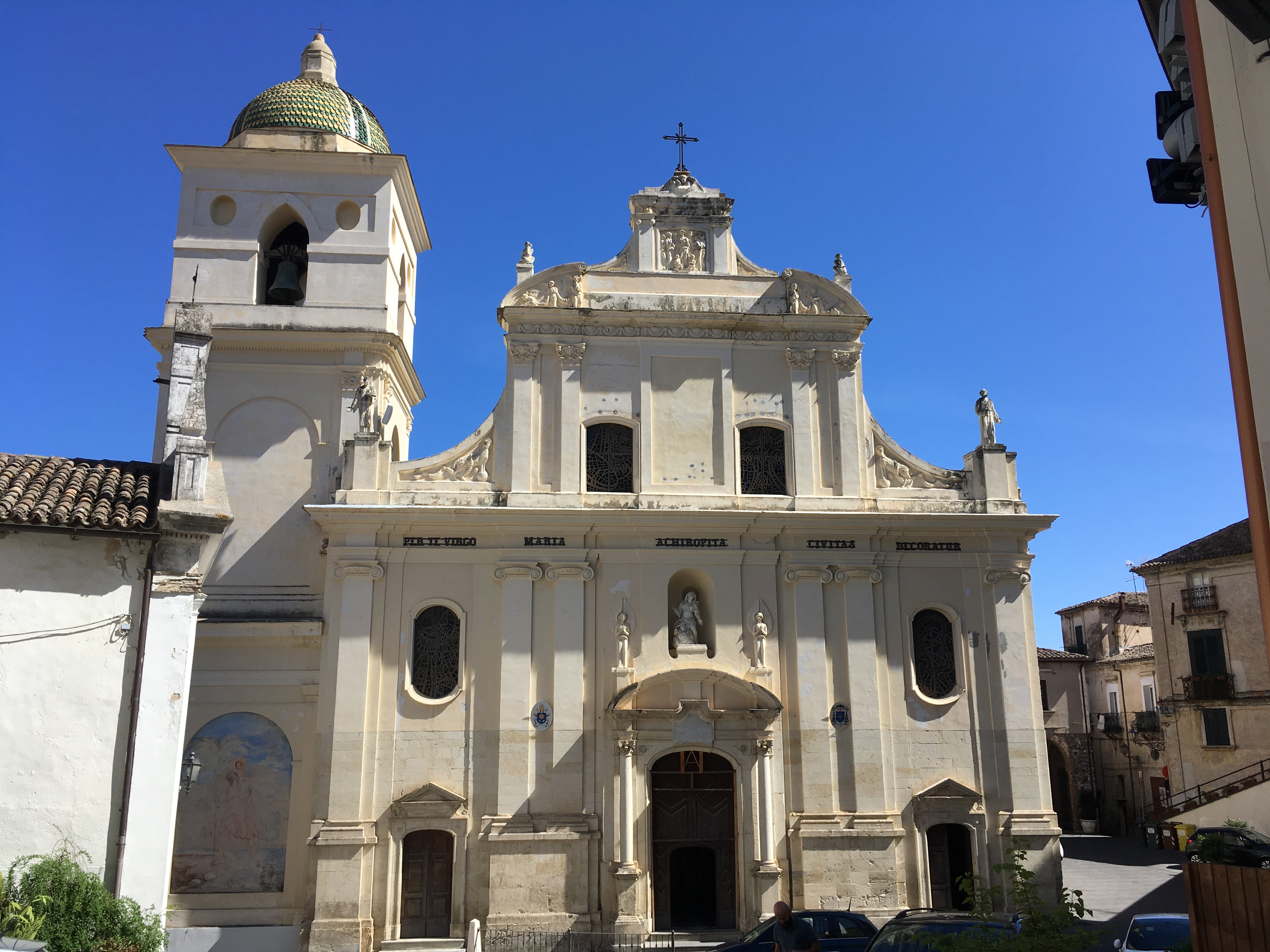
- Rossano, Cathedral of S. Maria Achiropita

Location
- Country: Italy
- Ecclesiastical province: Cosenza-Bisignano

Statistics
- Area: 1,415 km^{2} (546 sq mi)
- Population: Total; Catholics: (as of 2023); 122,190 ▼; 115,400 (est.) ▼
- Parishes: 56 ▲

Information
- Denomination: Catholic Church
- Sui iuris church: Latin Church
- Rite: Roman Rite
- Established: late 6th cent.
- Cathedral: Cattedrale di Maria SS. Achiropita (Rossano)
- Co-cathedral: Concattedrale di S. Michele Arcangelo (Cariati)
- Patron saints: Maria Achiropita; Nilo da Rossano; Leonardo Abate; Cataldo Vescovo
- Secular priests: 60 (diocesan) ▼16 (Religious Orders); 2 Permanent Deacons

Current leadership
- Pope: Leo XIV
- Archbishop: Maurizio Aloise
- Metropolitan Archbishop: Giovanni Checchinato

Map

Website
- rossanocariati.it

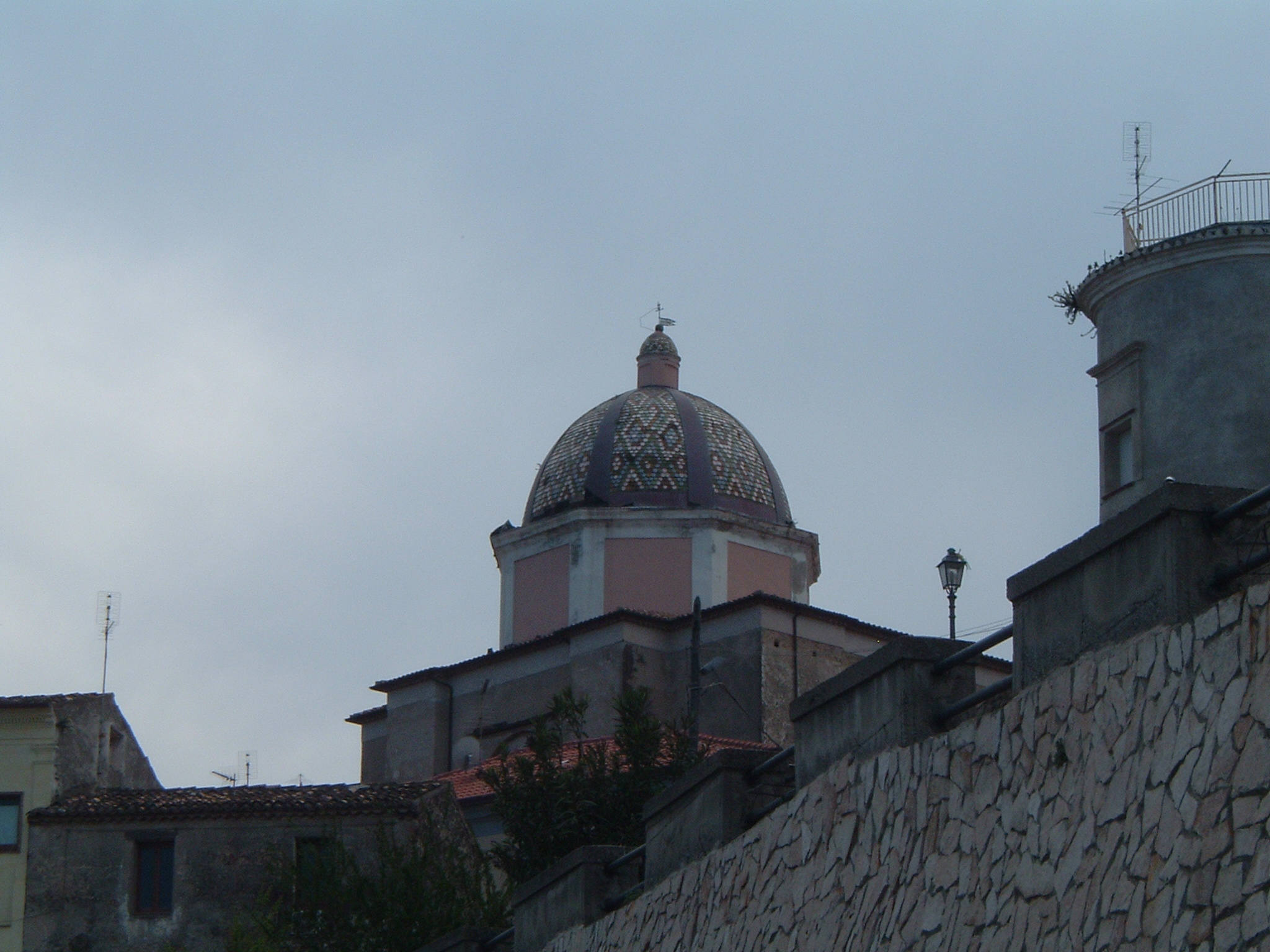
Co-cathedral in Cariati

The Archdiocese of Rossano–Cariati (Latin: Archidioecesis Rossanensis-Cariatensis) is a Latin diocese of the Catholic Church in Calabria that has existed since the 7th century. It is a suffragan of the Archdiocese of Cosenza-Bisignano.

== History ==
=== Middle Ages ===
Totila, King of the Goths (541–552) campaigned against the Byzantine cities of southern Italy, captured and devastated the Roman colony of Rossano.

At the time of Pope Gregory I (590–604), the dioceses in Bruttium were: Reggio Calabriae, Locri, Vibo Valentia, Tempsa, Scyllaecium, Croton, Cosentia, Thurii, Tauriana, Nicotera, Carina, and Myria. In the late 6th century, the Diocese of Rossano was established, after the Diocese of Thurio had become defunct and its people enslaved or dispersed as a result of the Lombard invasions. The first known bishop of this see is Valerianus, Bishop of the "Ecclesia Rosana" in the Roman Council of 680.

==== Greek possession of Calabria ====
Up to the 7th century, the bishops of Calabria and Sicily were consecrated in Rome, and attended the councils of the Popes. In the 8th and 9th century, except for the bishops of Cosenza, Bisignano, and Martorano, the bishops attended the councils of the Patriarch of Constantinople.

In the Diatyposis of the Emperor Leo the Wise (c. 900), the diocese of Thurii is still listed, as a suffragan bishopric of Reggio Calabriae, though the bishop's seat was then at Rossano. The archbishop of Reggio was a Greek Metropolitan, subordinate to the Patriarch of Constantinople. In the Notitia Episcopatuum of Leo the Wise and Patriarch Stephanus, Rossano is one of the three bishops rescued from the occupation of the Arabs and incorporated into the Greek empire.

The Oratory of San Marco in Rossano was built in the 10th century by St. Nilus the Younger as a place of retirement for nearby eremite monks and is one of the most important testimonies to Byzantine art in Italy. In 982 Emperor Otto II captured Rossano temporarily from the Byzantines, who had made it the capital of their possessions in Southern Italy. It preserved its Greek character long after its conquest by the Normans. At the end of the 10th century, in the time of Saint Nilus, the Byzantines demanded that the city of Rossano to fit out ships for the Byzantine fleet; the populace refused, and burned the ships in the harbor.

==== Normans, Rome, and Calabria ====
At the synod of Melfi held on 10–15 September 1089, Pope Urban II received the formal adhesion of the Greek archbishops of Rossano and Santa Severina to the Church of Rome. The Greek archbishop of Reggio Calabriae, who was elected in Constantinople, recoiled in horror at the acknowledgment of the papal primacy. He was replaced by a Latin-rite archbishop. In 1093, on the death of the same archbishop of Rossano, Duke Robert Guiscard attempted to have a Latin rite archbishop installed, but in the uproar, his son-in-law, William de Grandmesnil seized the city of Rossano and fortified it against the duke, who (it was reported) was near death. A military expedition in 1094 dislodged William from the city proper, and he was eventually deprived of all his territories. The Latin rite bishop, who was not yet consecrated, was withdrawn, and the clergy and people of Rossano were allowed to elect their own Greek archbishop. He was perhaps Nicholas Maleinos.

On 3 April 1218, Pope Honorius III responded to reports from the archpriest and more than three canons of the cathedral of Rossano that the dean of the Chapter, the archdeacon, and several canons had elected Basilius, the judex of Rossano, as their new archbishop. It was alleged that the judge had had people executed, that he was married, and that his election may have been simoniacal. He had been rushed through ordinations up to the diaconate in a single day. The pope ordered the archbishop of Cosenza to investigate the matter. If the reports were true, the archbishop was to void the election, deprive his electors of the power of electing, and suspend the bishop who carried out the ordinations. Eventually, Basilius was confirmed by Pope Honorius.

=== Chapter and cathedral ===
The Cattedrale di Maria Santissima Achiropita is the seat of the Archbishop of Rossano-Cariati. Built in the 11th century, it houses an ancient image of the Madonna Acheropita, an image of the Madonna and Child dated to somewhere between about 580 and the first half of the 8th century. In May 1193, King Tancred of Sicily donated part of the income of the dye works at Rossano to provide oil for a vigil light before the image.

The cathedral was served and administered by an ecclesiastical corporation called the Chapter, which was composed of six dignities (the Archdeacon, the Deacon, the Archpriest, the Cantor, the Treasurer, and the Sub-cantor) and eighteen canons.

The famous Codex Rossanensis, an illuminated volume of texts from the New Testament, was discovered in 1879 in the Rossano cathedral sacristy.

Archbishop Lancillotto Lancellotti (1573–1580) held a diocesan synod on 1 June 1574, and published the diocesan statutes.

The archdiocese had two seminaries (high schools), one in Rossano for students of the Latin rite, and the other at S. Demetrio called the seminary of the Italo-Greeks. The Latin seminary was the work of Archbishop Lucio Sanseverino (1592–1612) in 1594, while the Greek was founded in 1733, at the instigation of Pope Clement XII with the active support of Stefano and Felice Radota of the Albanian community of S. Benedetto Ullano.

=== Modern period ===
In 1460, the diocese was elevated to the rank of an archdiocese.

On 27 June 1818, with the bull De utiliori of Pope Pius VII, the dioceses of Cerenzia, Strongoli and Umbriatico were suppressed and their territories incorporated into the Diocese of Cariati.

On 13 February 1919, the diocese had territory transferred to create the Eparchy of Lungro for the Italo-Albanian Catholic Church. On April 4, 1979, the Archdiocese was merged with the Diocese of Cariati to become the Archdiocese of Rossano e Cariati. The former cathedral of the Archangel Michael, located in Cariati, was designated a co-cathedral.

=== Diocesan reorganization ===
The Second Vatican Council (1962–1965), in order to ensure that all Catholics received proper spiritual attention, decreed the reorganization of the diocesan structure of Italy and the consolidation of small and struggling dioceses. It also recommended the abolition of anomalous units such as exempt territorial prelatures.

On 4 April 1979, Pope John Paul II carried out a major reorganization of the ecclesiastical provinces of Campania and Calabria. The diocese of Cariati was permanently united aeque principaliter to the archdiocese of Rossano, as Rossano e Cariati.

==== A metropolitan ====
On 30 September 1986, Pope John Paul II ordered that the dioceses of Rossano e Cariati be merged into one diocese with one bishop, with the Latin title Archidioecesis Rossanensis-Cariatensis (Rossano-Cariati). The seat of the diocese was to be in Rossano, and the cathedral of Rossano was to serve as the cathedral of the merged dioceses. The cathedral in Cariati was to become a co-cathedral, and the cathedral Chapter was to be a Capitulum Concathedralis. There was to be only one diocesan Tribunal, in Rossano, and likewise one seminary, one College of Consultors, and one Priests' Council. The territory of the new diocese was to include the territory of the former dioceses of Rossano and Cariati. However, the united diocese was now made a suffragan of the metropolitan archdiocese of Reggio-Bova.

==== A different metropolitan ====
The situation for Rossano-Cariati changed again in 2001, when Pope John Paul II further reformed the diocesan structure of Calabria. On 30 January 2001, he ordered that the metropolitan status of the archdiocese of Cosenza-Bisignano be restored, and that it be assigned as suffragans the dioceses of Rossano-Cariata and Cassano, which were removed from the jurisdiction of the archdiocese of Reggio Calabria.

Inspired by Pope Francis' encyclical Laudato si', the nuns of the Convent of Saint Augustine in Rossano developed in conjunction with ten sponsoring organizations, the Rossano Garden Park project. They arrived in Rossano in 2009 from Eremo di Lecceto in Siena; St. Augustine's is the first convent of Augustinian nuns in Calabria.

== Rites ==
In the tenth century, or perhaps earlier, the Greek Rite was introduced at Rossano, and continued until the sixteenth century, although an attempt was made to introduce a Latin Rite bishop in 1093; in 1460 Bishop Matteo de' Saraceni attempted to enforce the use of the Latin rite. G.A. Loud points out that, after the debacle of 1093, "Rossano subsequently remained in the hands of Greek prelates until the early fourteenth century, and the Greek rite continued to be celebrated in the cathedral until 1461." The Greek Rite was maintained especially by the seven Basilian monasteries in the diocese, the most famous of which was Santa Maria in Patiro, which was granted the privilegium of liberty by Pope Paschal II in 1105.

=== Albanians and other refugees ===
The situation became considerably more complicated with the conquest of Naples by Alfonso V of Aragon in 1442. In order to establish his grip on Calabria, from 1448 he enlisted the aid of mercenary Albanian troops, who followed the Greek rite. Their, condottiere, Demetrio Reres, was appointed governor.

In 1498, the Ottoman Sultan Bayezid II seized the city of Corone (Koroni) in the southwest Peloponnese from the Venetians, and began a persecution of its inhabitants, who happened to be Albanians. In 1532, the Emperor Charles V sent the admiral Andrea Doria to liberate the city, but, by agreement with Suleiman the Magnificent, the inhabitants were evacuated to Italy. The largest part of the Albanians, with their Greek archbishop Benedict, were settled at S. Demetrio in the diocese of Rossano. To the annoyance of the local barons, the Latin rite bishops, and the Papacy, the Albanians maintained their culture, their language, and their adherence to the Greek rite. They would not assimilate.

Other Greek bishops and priests, fleeing the Ottoman Turks, found refuge in various places along the Adriatic coast, southern Italy, and Sicily. They contacted their fellow Greeks, and assumed direction of their ecclesiastical lives according to the Greek rite. They impinged upon the rights and responsibilities of the Latin bishops in established dioceses, bringing about animosities on both sides, leading to complaints to Rome. The claim that the pope had no jurisdiction over them was the most annoying.

Pope Pius IV therefore intervened on 16 February 1564, with a bull entitled "Romanus Pontifex." On his own authority he cancelled all the privileges of his predecessors which granted exemptions from the jurisdiction of the Latin rite bishops except in matters of ritual. He required all persons and institutes of the Greek rite to submit to the visitation and correction of the local bishops.

In 1577, Pope Gregory XIII officially founded the Collegio S. Anastasio in Rome, for the training of Greek-rite priests. Preparatory work had already been done by Cardinal Giulio Antonio Santorio, the Cardinal of S. Severina, the Protector of Eastern rite Catholics.

In 1593, Pope Clement VIII created a special congregation to address the problems arising from complaints made to the Cardinal of Santa Severina about the hostile behavior of the bishops of Cassano and Ancona, and persons in the diocese of Naples. working from 1593 to 31 August 1595, the congregation issued a set of instructions, the "Instructio super aliquibus ritibus Graecorum ad RR. PP. DD. Episcopos latinos in quorum civitatibus Graeci et Albanenses graeco ritu viventes degunt." A bishop of the Greek rite was established in Rome to carry out ordinations of priests to the Italo-Albanian community. This was intended to remove the abuse of candidates for ordination travelling to Greece to be ordained by schismatic Greek-rite bishops.

When the Congregation de Propaganda Fide was established in 1622, it was intended that a special Visitator was to be sent to the kingdom of Naples to investigate the condition of the Italo-Greeks, especially the Albanians. Steps were also to be taken to establish two seminaries for the Ital-Greeks, at Messina and at Reggio. Though Instructions were drawn up, the Court of Naples refused to grant the exequator, and the project died. In 1635, the exequator was granted, but almost immediately revoked. In 1673, the Archbishop of Rossano, Angelo della Noca, OSB (1671–1675), made a long report to the Propaganda on the condition of the Greek rite in his diocese, complaining in particular that people of the Greek rite leapt from one rite to the other as convenience suited; but the most that the Congregation was able to do was to indicate that there were persons in his diocese who could act with the archbishop's ordinary authority, and to propose sending a delegate of the archbishop to Rossano to correct the abuses there.

Pope Benedict XIV made a major effort to bring clarity to the doctrinal and ritual situation of eastern Catholics in Italy and Sicily, particularly Albanians, in his bull "Etsi Pastoralis," which was published on 26 May 1742. His work was in effect a codification of the decrees of previous popes, including Innocent IV, Leo X, Clement VII, Paul III, Julius III, Pius IV, Pius V, Gregory XIII, and Clement VIII.

The Roman rite archbishops were always directly dependent upon the Holy See.

== Bishops and Archbishops ==
=== Diocese of Rossano ===
Latin Name: Rossanensis
Erected: 7th Century

- Saturninus (680)
- Cosmas (820)

...

- Romanus (1089, 1091)
- Nicholas Maleinos (fl. 1105)
- Ignotus (1112)

...

- Nicholas (d. 1131)

...

- Dionysius (c. 1144– ? )

...

- Joannes (c. 1167)
- Cosmas, O.S.Basil. (c. 1187–1196)
- Paschal (1198–1218)
- Basilius (1218–1239)
- Basilius (1239–1254?)
- Elias, O.S.Basil. (1254– ? )
- Angelus (1266–1285)
- Paulus
- Basilius
- Rogerius (1306–1312)
- Gregorius (1312–1316)
- Isaias (1365–1373)
- Joannes de Gallinario, O.Min. (1373)
- Joannes (1373–1376).
- Antonius Trara (1377–c. 1385)
- Joannes Stallionis (1385–1387), Avignon Obedience
- Robertus Joannis de Tarento (1387– ? ), Avignon Obedience
- Nicolaus (c. 1385–1394), Roman Obedience
- Gerardus (1394–1399), Roman Obedience
- Nicolaus (1399–1403)
- Joannes (1403–1405)
- Bartolommeo Gattula (1406–1422)
- Nicolaus de Cassia, O.Min. (1422–1429)
- Angelo (1429–1433 Appointed Archbishop (Personal Title) of Tricarico)
- Stefano di Carrara (1433–1434)
- Antonio Roda Sergentino (1434–1442 removed)
- Nicola de Martino (1442–1447)
- Giacomo Della Ratta (1447–1451 Appointed, Archbishop of Benevento)
- Domenico de Lagonessa, O.S.B. (1452–1459)

=== Archdiocese of Rossano ===
Latin Name: Rossanensis
Elevated: 1460

==== From 1460 to 1800 ====
- Matteo de Saraceni, O.F.M. (1460–1481)
- Nicola Ippoliti (1481–1493)
- Giovanni Battista Lagni (1493–1508)

○ Cardinal Bernardino López de Carvajal,
Apostolic Administrator (1508–1519)

- Juan Rodríguez de Fonseca (1519–1524)
- Vincenzo Pimpinella (1525–1534)
- Francesco Colonna (1534–1544)
- Girolamo Verallo (November 14, 1544 – 1551 Resigned)
- Paolo Emilio Verallo (1551–1553)
- Giovanni Battista Castagna (1553–1573 Resigned)
- Lancillotto Lancellotti (1573–1580)
- Lelio Giordano (1580–1581)
- Silvio Savelli (1582–1589)
- Scipione Floccaro (1589–1592)
- Lucio Sanseverino (1592–1612)
- Mario Sassi (1612–1615)
- Girolamo Pignatelli, O.Theat. (1615–1618)
- Ercole Vaccari (1619–1624)
- Paolo Torelli (1624–1629)
- Pietro Antonio Spinelli (1629–1645)
- Giacomo Carafa (1646–1664)
- Carlo Spinola, OSM (1664–1671)
- Angelo della Noca, OSB (1671–1675)
- Girolamo Orsaja, OM (1676–1683)
- Girolamo Compagnone (1685–1687)
- Andrea de Rossi, O.Theat. (1688–1696)
- Andrea Deodati, OSB (1697–1713)
- Francesco Maria Muscettola, O.Theat. (1717–1738)
- Stanislao Poliastri (1738–1761)
- Guglelmo Camaldari (1762–1778)
- Andrea Cardamone (1778–1800)

==== From 1800 to 1980 ====
- Gaetano Paolo de Miceli, C.P.O. (1804–1813)
- Carlo Puoti (1818–1826)
- Salvatore de Luca (1827–1833)
- Bruno Maria Tedeschi (1835–1843)
- Pietro Cilento (1844–1885)
- Salvatore Palmieri, C.Pp.S. (1889–1891)
- Donato Maria Dell'Olio 1891–1898)
- Orazio Mazzella (1898–1917)
- Giovanni Scotti (1918–1930)
- Domenico Marsiglia (May 28, 1931 – May 20, 1948)
- Giovanni Rizzo (January 13, 1949 – November 18, 1971 Retired)
- Antonio Cantisani (1971–1980)

=== Archdiocese of Rossano e Cariati ===
Latin Name: Rossanensis et Cariatensis
United: April 4, 1979

- Serafino Sprovieri (1980–1991)

=== Archdiocese of Rossano–Cariati ===
Latin Name: Rossanensis-Cariatensis
Cariati suppressed: 30 September 1986

- Andrea Cassone (1992–2006 Retired)
- Santo Marcianò (2006–2013)
- Giuseppe Satriano (15 July 2014 – 2020)
- Maurizio Aloise (20 March 2021 – present)

== Diocese of Turio ==
The archdiocese includes the ancient Diocese of Turio (Thurii), a city which arose in 437 after the destruction of Sybaris, through the efforts of Pericles of Athens. Five of its bishops are known, the earliest being Giovanni, who attended Roman councils in 501; Bishop Valentinus attended the Lateran council of 649. Bishop Theophanes subscribed the synodal letter of Pope Agatho in 680. The apparent last known bishop, Guglielmo, is said to have attended the Lateran council of Pope Paschal II in 1110, though the evidence does not support the claim.

== See also ==
- Roman Catholic Diocese of Cariati
- Abbazia del Patire

== Sources ==
=== Lists of bishops ===
- Gams, Pius Bonifatius (1873). Series episcoporum Ecclesiae catholicae: quotquot innotuerunt a beato Petro apostolo (in Latin). Ratisbon: Typis et Sumptibus Georgii Josephi Manz. pp. 917–918.
- Eubel, Conradus, ed. (1913). Hierarchia catholica (in Latin). Vol. Tomus 1 (second ed.). Münster: Libreria Regensbergiana.
- Eubel, Conradus, ed. (1914). Hierarchia catholica (in Latin). Vol. Tomus 2 (second ed.). Münster: Libreria Regensbergiana.
- Eubel, Conradus; Gulik, Guilelmus, eds. (1923). Hierarchia catholica (in Latin). Vol. Tomus 3 (second ed.). Münster: Libreria Regensbergiana.
- Gauchat, Patritius (Patrice) (1935). Hierarchia catholica (in Latin). Vol. Tomus IV (1592-1667). Münster: Libraria Regensbergiana.
- Ritzler, Remigius; Sefrin, Pirminus (1952). Hierarchia catholica medii et recentis aevi V (1667-1730) (in Latin). Patavii: Messagero di S. Antonio.
- Ritzler, Remigius; Sefrin, Pirminus (1958). Hierarchia catholica medii et recentis aevi (in Latin). Vol. Tomus VI (1730-1799). Patavii: Messagero di S. Antonio.
- Ritzler, Remigius; Sefrin, Pirminus (1968). Hierarchia Catholica medii et recentioris aevi sive summorum pontificum, S. R. E. cardinalium, ecclesiarum antistitum series... A pontificatu Pii PP. VII (1800) usque ad pontificatum Gregorii PP. XVI (1846) (in Latin). Vol. VII. Monasterii: Libr. Regensburgiana.
- Remigius Ritzler; Pirminus Sefrin (1978). Hierarchia catholica Medii et recentioris aevi... A Pontificatu PII PP. IX (1846) usque ad Pontificatum Leonis PP. XIII (1903) (in Latin). Vol. VIII. Il Messaggero di S. Antonio.
- Pięta, Zenon (2002). Hierarchia catholica medii et recentioris aevi (in Latin). Vol. 9 (1903–1922). Padua: Messagero di San Antonio. ISBN 978-88-250-1000-8.

=== Studies ===
- Cappelletti, Giuseppe (1870). Le chiese d'Italia dalla loro origine sino ai nostri giorni (in Italian). Vol. 21 (Tomo vigesimo primo). Venezia: G. Antonelli. pp. 273–282. [somewhat unreliable]
- Capra, Raymond L.; Murzaku, Ines A.; Milewski, Douglas J. (ed., tr.) (2018). The Life of Saint Neilos of Rossano. Cambridge MA: Harvard UP 2018. [Dumbarton Oaks Medieval Library, 47].
- D'Avino, Vincenzo (1848). Cenni storici sulle chiese arcivescovili, vescovili, e prelatizie (nullius) del Regno delle Due Sicilie (in Italian). dalle stampe di Ranucci. pp. 567-592.. [text by Canon Leopoldo Pagano]. Archived.
- De Rosis, Luca (1838). Cenno storico della città di Rossano e delle sue nobili famiglie. (in Italian). Napoli: Nicola Mosca 1838. [highly unreliable]
- Kamp, Norbert (1975). Kirche und Monarchie im staufischen Königreich Sizilien. I. Prosopographische Grundlegung. Bistümer und Bischöfe des Königreichs 1194-1266. 2. Apulien und Kalabrien. (in German). Münich: Wilhelm Fink 1975. pp. 871–880.
- Kehr, Paul Fridolin (1975). (Ed. Dieter Girgensohn). Italia pontificia. Vol. X: Calabria—Insulae. (in Latin). Turici: Weidmann. pp. 99–108.
- Loud, G. A. (2007). The Latin Church in Norman Italy. Cambridge University Press. ISBN 978-1-107-32000-0.
- Taccone-Gallucci, Domenico (1902). Regesti dei Romani pontefici della Calabria (in Italian). Rome: Tip. Vaticana. pp. 432–433.
- Ughelli, Ferdinando; Coleti, Niccolò (1721). Italia sacra sive De Episcopis Italiae, et insularum adjacentium (in Latin). Vol. 9 (Tomus nonus) (editio secunda, aucta et emendata ed.). Venice: apud Sebastianum Coleti. pp. 285–314.
- [Unknown], Il rito greco nell'italia inferiore. nota di Segretoria. (in Italian). Roma: Tipografia poliglotta Vaticana 1917.
