= Basilian monks =

Order of Catholic monks

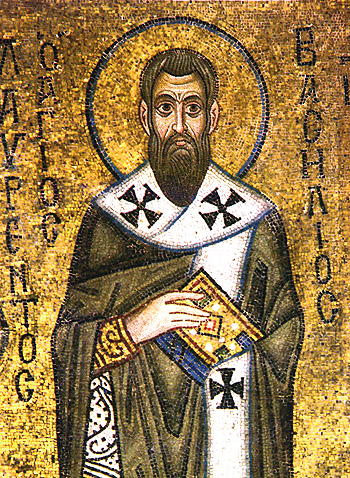
Mosaic of St. Basil the Great from Saint Sophia Cathedral, Kyiv, Ukraine.

Basilian monks are Eastern Christian monks who follow the rule of Basil the Great, bishop of Caesarea (330–379). The term 'Basilian' is typically used only in the Catholic Church to distinguish Greek Catholic monks from other forms of monastic life in the Catholic Church. In the Eastern Orthodox Church, all monks follow the Rule of Saint Basil, and so do not distinguish themselves as 'Basilian'.

The monastic rules and institutes of St. Basil are important because their reconstruction of monastic life remains the basis for most Eastern Orthodox and some Greek Catholic monasticism. Benedict of Nursia, who fulfilled much the same function in the West, took his Regula Benedicti from the writings of Basil and other earlier Church Fathers.

== Rule of St. Basil ==
All religious who follow the Rule of St. Basil are embraced within the term "Basilians", although the "Rule" is not a singular document like various Western monastic rules; rather, it is a collection of Basil's responses to questions about the ascetic life: hence a more accurate, original name is Asketikon.

Attribution of the Rule and other ascetical writings to St. Basil has been questioned. But the tendency is to recognize as his, at any rate, the two sets of Rules: the Greater Asketikon and the Lesser Asketikon. Perhaps the truest idea of his monastic system may be derived from a correspondence between him and St. Gregory Nazianzen at the beginning of his monastic life.

St. Basil drew up his Asketikon for the members of the monastery he founded in about 356 on the banks of the Iris River in Cappadocia. Before forming this community, St. Basil had visited Egypt, Coele-Syria, Mesopotamia, and Palestine to investigate monastic life in these countries. In Palestine and Syria, monasticism tended to become increasingly eremitical and run to great extravagances in bodily austerities. When St. Basil formed his monastery in the neighborhood of Neocaesarea in Pontus, he deliberately set himself against these tendencies. He declared cenobitical life as superior to the eremitical; that fasting and austerities should not interfere with prayer or work; that work should be an integral part of monastic life, not merely as an occupation, but for its own sake and to do good to others; and therefore, monasteries should be near towns. St. Gregory Nazianzen, who shared the retreat, aided St. Basil by his advice and experience. All this was a new departure in monachism.

In his Rule, St. Basil follows the catechetical structure wherein the disciple asks a question to which the master replies. As he visited early ascetic communities, the members there would have questions. His responses were written down and formed the "Small Asketikon", published in 366.

He limits himself to laying down indisputable principles which will guide superiors and monks in their conduct. He has his monks refer to Sacred Scripture; in his eyes, the Bible is the basis of all monastic law and is the true Rule. The questions refer generally to the virtues monks should practice and the vices to avoid. The greater number of his replies quote one or several verses from the Bible, then comment on their meaning. The most striking qualities of the Basilian Rule are its prudence and its wisdom, leaving to superiors the care of settling the many details of local, individual, and daily life. It also does not delineate the material exercise of observance, or the administrative regulations of each monastery. Poverty, obedience, renunciation, and self-abnegation are the virtues which St. Basil cites as foundational to monastic life. The rule's references to "diligent work", linked to the role of hospitality and care for the needy, are highlighted in Pope Leo XIV's exhortation to all Christians on "love for the poor".

The Rule of St. Basil is divided into two parts, the "Greater Monastic Rules" and the "Lesser Rules". In 397, Rufinus translated these into Latin as a single document, Regulae sancti Basilii episcopi Cappadociae ad monachos. St. Basil's influence ensured the propagation of Basilian monachism; and Sozomen says that in Cappadocia and nearby provinces there were no hermits but only cenobites. This Rule was followed by some Western monasteries, and was a major source for the Rule of St. Benedict.

== Monasteries ==
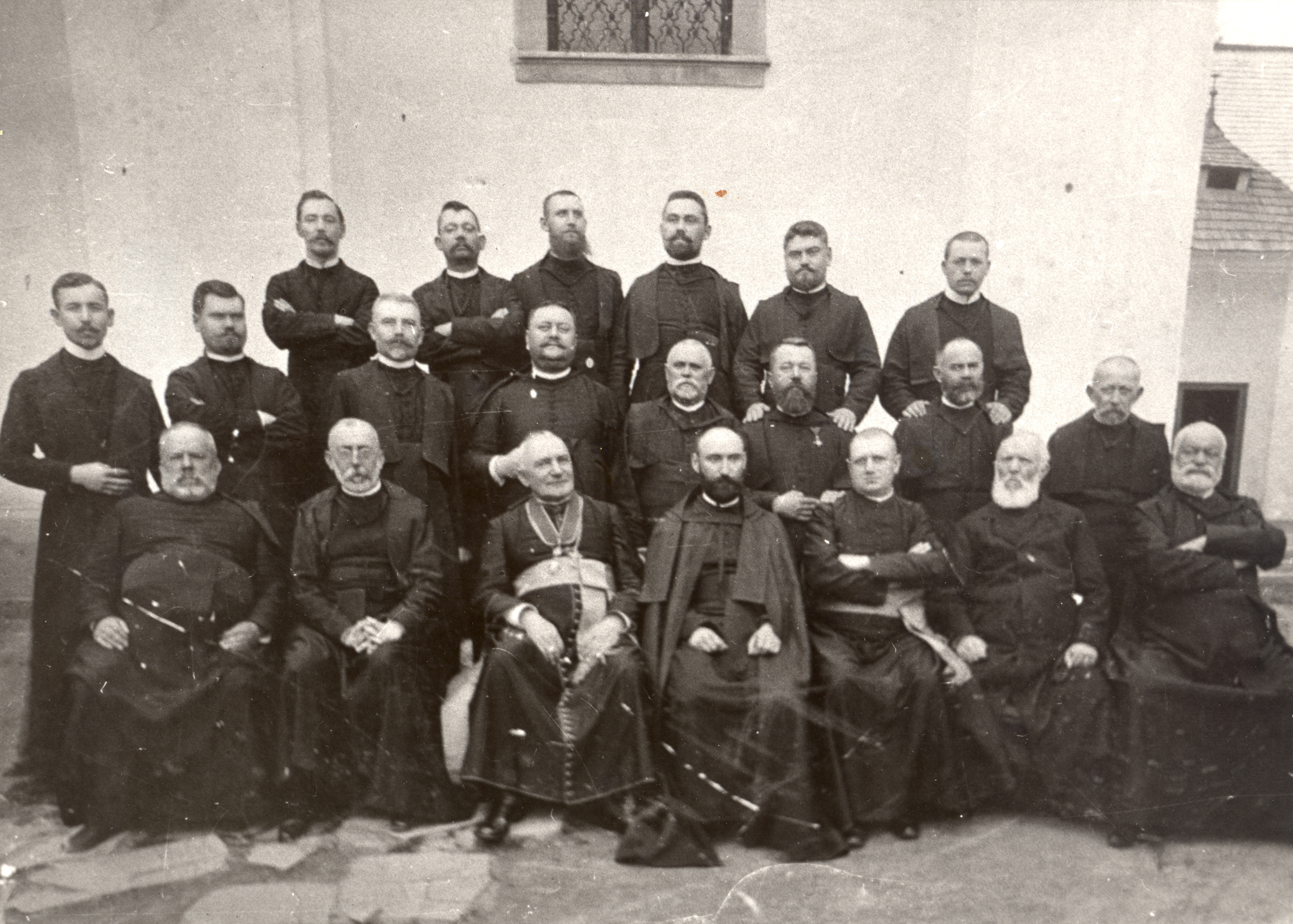
Basilian monks in Hungary, c. 1909

The monasteries of Cappadocia were the first to accept the Rule of St. Basil; it afterwards spread gradually to most monasteries in the East. Those of Armenia, Chaldea, and of the Syrian countries in general preferred instead the observances known among them as the Rule of St. Anthony. Protected by emperors and patriarchs, the monasteries increased rapidly in number. The monks took an active part in the ecclesiastical life of their time as monasteries became places of refuge for studious men. Many bishops and patriarchs were chosen from their ranks, and gave to the preaching of the Gospel its greatest apostles. The position of monks in the Empire was one of great power, and their wealth helped to increase their influence. Thus, their development ran a course parallel to that of their Western brethren.

As a rule, monks followed the theological vicissitudes of the emperors and patriarchs, and showed no notable independence except during the iconoclastic persecution; the stand they took in this aroused the anger of imperial controversialists. The Faith had its martyrs among them; many of them were condemned to exile, and some took advantage of this condemnation to reorganize their religious life in Italy.

Of all the monasteries of this period the most celebrated was that of St. John the Baptist of Stoudio, founded at Constantinople in the fifth century. It acquired its fame in the time of the iconoclastic persecution while it was under the government of the saintly hegoumenos (abbot) Theodore, called the Studite. In 781, Platon, a monk of the Symbola Monastery in Bithynia, and the uncle of Theodore the Studite, converted the family estate into the Sakkoudion Monastery. Platon served as abbot, with Theodore as his assistant. In 794, Theodore was ordained by Tarasios of Constantinople and became abbot. Around 797, Empress Irene made Theodore leader of the ancient Stoudios Monastery in Constantinople. He set himself to reform his monastery and restore St. Basil's spirit in its primitive vigour. To do this and ensure its permanence, he saw need for a more practical code of laws to regulate details of the daily life, supplementary to St. Basil's Rules. He therefore drew up constitutions, later codified, which became the norm at Stoudios and gradually spread to the monasteries in the rest of the Empire. Thus, to this day the Rule of St. Basil and the Constitutions of Theodore the Studite, along with the canons of the Councils, constitute the chief part of Greek and Russian monastic law.

The monastery was an active center of intellectual and artistic life and a model which exercised considerable influence on monastic observances in the East. Theodore attributed the observances followed by his monks to his uncle, the saintly Abbot Plato, who first introduced them in his monastery of Sakkoudion. The other monasteries, one after another adopted them, and they are still followed by monks on Mount Athos.

Monks from Athos participated at the Seventh Ecumenical Council of Nicaea of 787. In 885, a decree of Emperor Basil I proclaimed Mount Athos a place of monks, with no laymen or farmers or cattle-breeders allowed to settle there. The Monastery of St. Catherine on Mount Sinai, built in 548, goes back to the early days of monasticism, and is still occupied by monks.

Fine penmanship and the copying of manuscripts were held in honor among the Basilians. Among the monasteries which excelled in the art of copying were Stoudios, Mount Athos, the monastery on Patmos and that of Rossano in Sicily; the tradition was continued later by the monastery of Grottaferrata near Rome. These monasteries and others were also studios of religious art, as the monks toiled to produce miniatures in manuscripts, paintings, and gold objects.

== Notable monks ==
- Leontius of Byzantium (d. 543), author of an influential series of theological writings on sixth-century Christological controversies.
- Sophronius of Jerusalem, Patriarch of Jerusalem in 634, a monk and theologian who was the chief protagonist for orthodox teaching in the doctrinal controversy on the essential nature of Jesus and his volitional acts.
- Maximus the Confessor, Abbot of Chrysopolis (d. 662), the most brilliant representative of Byzantine monasticism in the seventh century.
- St. John Damascene, who wrote works expounding the Christian faith, and composed hymns which are still used both liturgically in worldwide Eastern Christianity, as well as in Lutheranism at Easter.

Byzantine monasteries furnish a long line of historians who were also monks: Georgius Syncellus, who wrote a "Selected Chronographia"; his friend and disciple Theophanes (d. 817), Abbot of the "Great Field" near Cyzicus, the author of another Chronographia; Patriarch Nikephoros, who wrote (815–829) an historical Breviarium (a Byzantine history), and an "Abridged Chronographia"; George the Monk, whose Chronicle stops at A. D. 842.

There were, besides, a large number of monks, hagiographers, hymnologists, and poets who had a large share in the development of Greek liturgy. Among the authors of hymns may be mentioned: Romanus the Melodist; Andrew of Crete; Cosmas of Jerusalem, and Joseph the Hymnographer.

From the beginning, the Oriental Churches often took their patriarchs and bishops from the monasteries. Later, when the secular clergy were recruited largely from among married men, this custom became almost universal, for, as the episcopal office could not be conferred upon men who were married, it developed to become a privilege of the religious who had taken the vow of celibacy. Owing to this, the monks formed a separate class akin to the upper clergy of Western Churches; this gave and still gives a preponderating influence to the monasteries themselves. In some of them theological instruction is given both to clerics and to laymen. In the East, convents for women adopted the Rule of St. Basil and have constitutions copied from those of Basilian monks.

St. Cyril and St. Methodius, the Apostles of the Slavs were noted Basilian missionaries. In 1980, Pope John Paul II declared them co-patron saints of Europe, together with St. Benedict of Nursia.

During the Muslim conquest, a large number of monasteries were destroyed, especially those monasteries in Anatolia and the region around Constantinople.

== Basilians in Italy ==
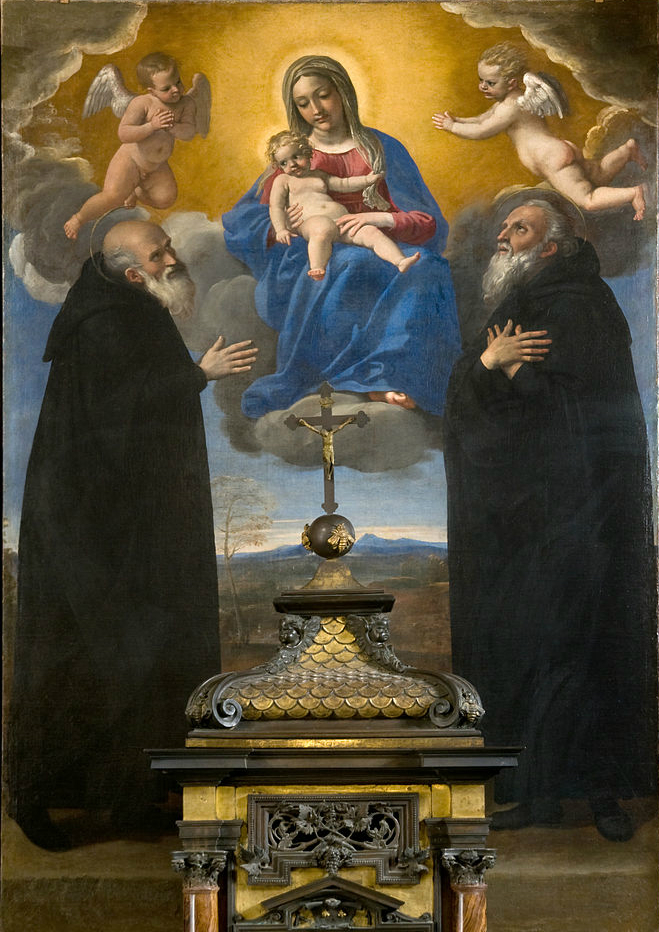
St. Nilus and St. Bartholomew of Grottaferrata

After the Great Schism, most Basilian monasteries became part of the Eastern Orthodox Church; some in Italy remained in communion with the Catholic Church.

St. Nilus the Younger was a monk and a propagator of the Rule of St. Basil in Italy. The Oratory of Saint Mark in Rossano was founded by Nilus, as a place of retirement for nearby eremite monks. It retained the Greek Rite long after the town came under Norman rule. The Rossano Gospels is a 6th-century illuminated manuscript evangeliary written following the reconquest of the Italian Peninsula by the Byzantine Empire.

In 1004, St. Nilus founded the Basilian Monastery of Santa Maria, in Grottaferrata; it was completed by his disciple Bartholomew of Grottaferrata, who was also of Greek heritage. The emigration of Greeks to the West after the fall of Constantinople gave a certain prestige to these communities. Cardinal Bessarion, who was Abbot of Grottaferrata, sought to stimulate the intellectual life of the Basilians by means of the literary treasures which their libraries contained. Other Italian monasteries of the Basilian Order were affiliated with the Monastery of Grottaferrata in 1561.

Spanish Basilians were suppressed with the other orders in 1835, and have since not been re-established.

== Religious orders ==
- Order of Saint Basil the Great: a Ukrainian-Belarusian monastic order of the Greek Catholic Churches, founded in 1631. Its motherhouse is Santi Sergio e Bacco degli Ucraini in Rome, Italy.
- Ukrainian Studite Monks: an ancient order absorbed in the 17th century by the Order of Saint Basil the Great (see above). It was re-established in 1919.
- Basilian Salvatorian Order: part of the Melkite Greek Catholic Church, founded in 1683. Its motherhouse is the Monastery of Saint Saviour in Joun, Lebanon.
- Basilian Chouerite Order of Saint John the Baptist: part of the Melkite Greek Catholic Church, founded in 1696. Its motherhouse is the Church of Saint John the Baptist in Dhour El Choueir, Lebanon.
- Basilian Aleppian Order: part of the Melkite Greek Catholic Church, founded in 1697. Its headquarters are in Sarba, Keserwan-Jbeil, Lebanon.
- Basilian Chouerite Sisters: part of the Melkite Greek Catholic Church, founded in 1737.
- Basilian Aleppian Sisters: part of the Melkite Greek Catholic Church, founded in 1740.

== See also ==
- Eastern Christian Monasticism
- Order of Saint Benedict (Orthodox)
- Silvester of Troina
