= San Basilio agli Orti Sallustiani =

- Church of Saint Basil at the Gardens of Sallust
- Chiesa di San Basilio agli Orti Sallustiani
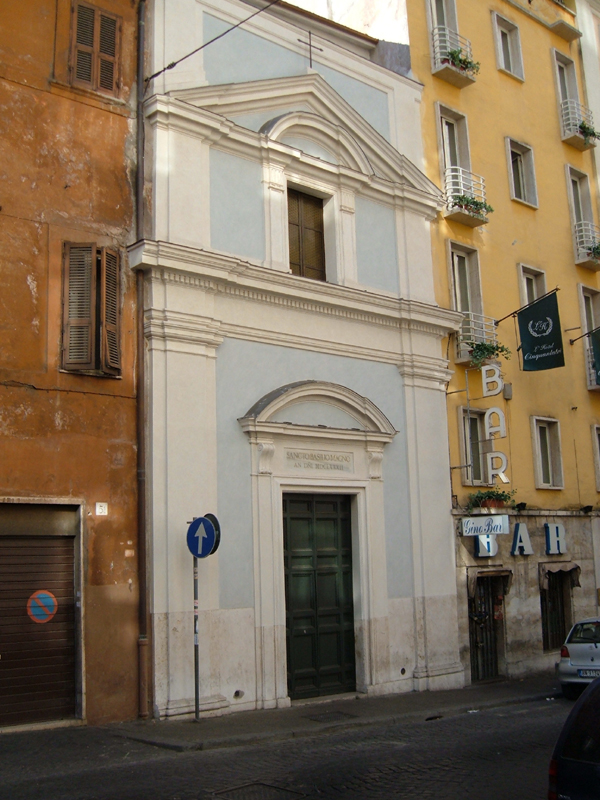
- The façade of San Basilio
- Click on the map for a fullscreen view
- 41°54′18″N 12°29′24″E
- Location: Via di San Basilio 51, Trevi, Rome
- Country: Italy
- Language: Greek
- Denomination: Greek Byzantine Catholic Church
- Tradition: Byzantine Rite

History
- Status: national church
- Dedication: Saint Basil

Architecture
- Architect: Carlo Francesco Bizzaccheri
- Architectural type: Baroque
- Completed: 1682

Administration
- Diocese: Rome

San Basilio agli Orti Sallustiani (Saint Basil at the Horti Sallustiani) is a rectory church in Rome, on via Trevi in the Trevi district. It is dedicated to Saint Basil. The church is a secondary place of worship for the Parish of San Camillo de Lellis.

== History ==
It was built by abbot Apolemone Agreste (Apollinare Agresta), whose coat of arms can be seen on the church's arches. It is sited next to a hospice of the Italo-Greco college of Basilian monks (the order founded by its patron saint) of Grottaferrata—they restored the church in 1682, as recorded by the inscription over its main entrance.

The church houses several inscriptions recording monks and priests of the college, including cardinal Basilios Bessarion, commendatory abbot of Grottaferrata, who was made a cardinal by pope Eugenius IV in 1439. The church and part of the college are still owned by the Italian Basilian Order of Grottaferrata, whilst the rest is owned by the Italian state.

== Present Day ==
At the end of the 20th century, the church was not often found open and the celebration of the liturgy became infrequent. Grottaferrata Abbey found it difficult to justify the maintenance of the property on its own account, and so the church quietly closed down at the start of the 21st century. The abbey then entered into an agreement to renovate the complex as a residence for students of the Melkite Greek Catholic Church, already present in Rome at Santa Maria in Cosmedin.

The new Collegio San Basilio is run by the Melkite monastic Basilian Order of the Holy Saviour, and was opened in 2017. Grottaferrata Abbey remains in possession of the property, however, which it is leasing.

== Bibliography ==
Additional sources

- C. Rendina, Le Chiese di Roma, Newton & Compton Editori, Milano 2000
- M. Quercioli, Rione IV Campo Marzio, in AA.VV, I rioni di Roma, Newton & Compton Editori, Milano 2000, Vol. I, pp. 264-334
