= Girolamo Pignatelli =

Italian Roman Catholic prelate (1566–1618)

Most Reverend Girolamo Pignatelli
- Archbishop of Rossano
- Church: Catholic Church
- Archdiocese: Archdiocese of Rossano
- In office: 1615–1618
- Predecessor: Mario Sassi
- Successor: Ercole Vaccari

Orders
- Consecration: 28 May 1615 by Giovanni Garzia Mellini

Personal details
- Born: 1566 Naples, Italy
- Died: 22 December 1618 (age 52) Rossano, Italy

Girolamo Pignatelli (1566 – 22 December 1618) was a Roman Catholic prelate who served as Archbishop of Rossano (1615–1618).

== Biography ==
Pignatelli was born in Naples, Italy in 1566 and ordained a priest in the Congregation of Clerics Regular of the Divine Providence.

On 18 May 1615, Pignatelli was appointed during the papacy of Pope Paul V as Archbishop of Rossano.

On 28 May 1615, Pignatelli was consecrated bishop by Giovanni Garzia Mellini, Cardinal-Priest of Santi Quattro Coronati with Ascanio Gesualdo, Archbishop of Bari-Canosa, and Giovanni Battista del Tufo, Bishop Emeritus of Acerra, serving as co-consecrators.

Pignatelli served as Archbishop of Rossano until his death on 22 December 1618.

== External links and additional sources ==
- Cheney, David M. "Archdiocese of Rossano-Cariati". Catholic-Hierarchy.org. (for Chronology of Bishops)
- Chow, Gabriel. "Archdiocese of Rossano-Cariati (Italy)". GCatholic.org. (for Chronology of Bishops)

Catholic Church titles
Preceded by Mario Sassi	Archbishop of Rossano; 1615–1618	Succeeded by Ercole Vaccari
