= Lectionary 128 =

Lectionary ℓ 128
- New Testament manuscript
- Text: Evangelistarion
- Date: 14th century
- Script: Greek
- Now at: Vatican Library
- Size: 29.5 cm by 22.7 cm

Lectionary 128, designated by siglum ℓ 128 (in the Gregory-Aland numbering) is a Greek manuscript of the New Testament, on parchment leaves. Palaeographically it has been assigned to the 14th century.

== Description ==
The codex contains lessons from the Gospels of John, Matthew, Luke lectionary (Evangelistarium), on 393 parchment leaves (29.5 cm by 22.7 cm). The text is written in Greek minuscule letters, in one columns per page, 13 lines per page.

== History ==
The manuscript used to be held in Grottaferrata. The manuscript was added to the list of New Testament manuscripts by Johann Martin Augustin Scholz.

The manuscript is not cited in the critical editions of the Greek New Testament (UBS3).

The codex is located in the Vatican Library (Vat. gr. 2133) in Rome.

== See also ==
- List of New Testament lectionaries
- Biblical manuscript
- Textual criticism

== Bibliography ==
- J. M. A. Scholz, Biblisch-kritische Reise in Frankreich, der Schweiz, Italien, Palästine und im Archipel in den Jahren 1818, 1819, 1820, 1821: Nebst einer Geschichte des Textes des Neuen Testaments, Leipzig, 1823.
