= Rossano Cathedral =

Cathedral in Rossano, Italy

Coordinates: 39.5750°N 16.6353°E

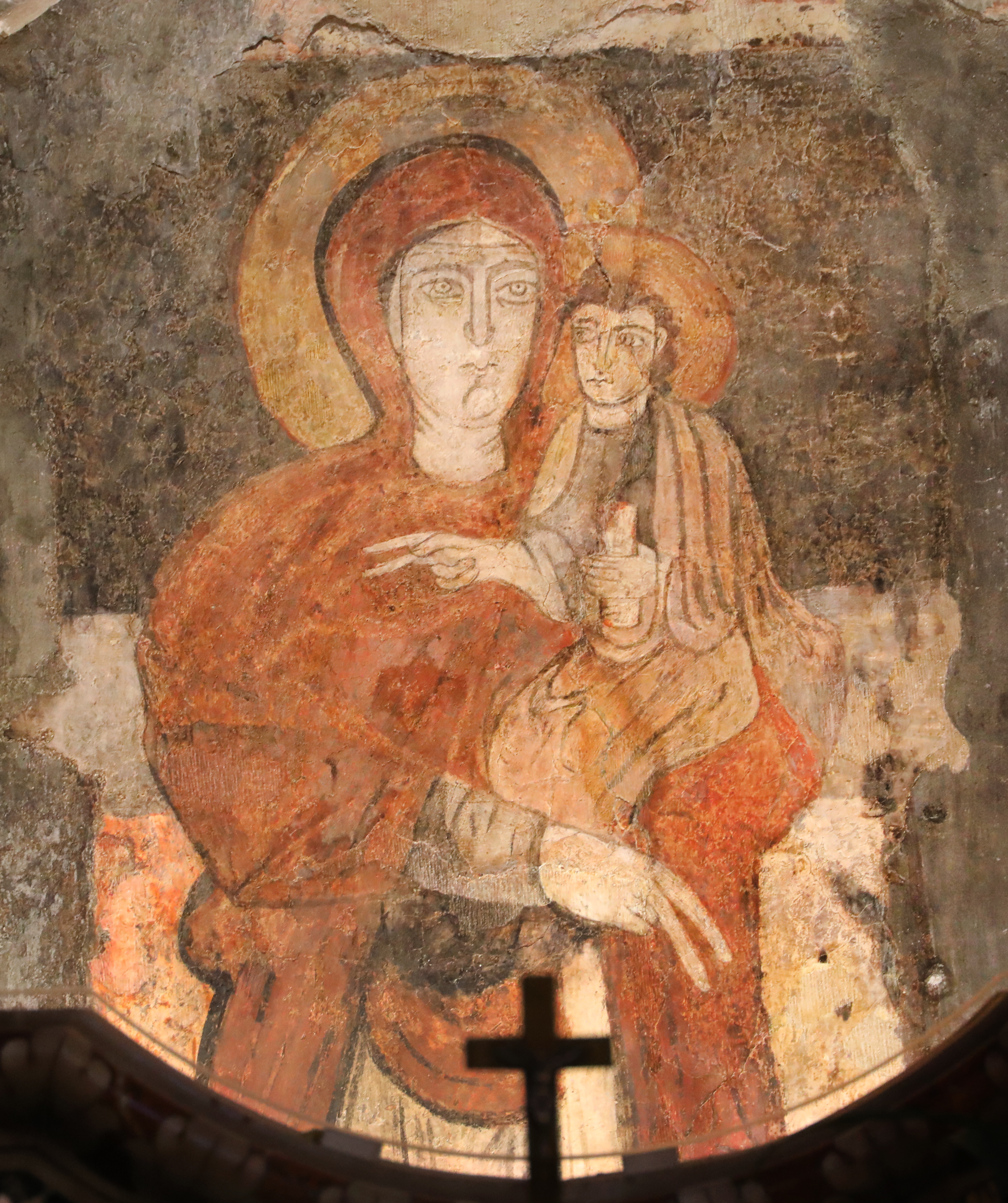
Maria Santissima Acheropita in the cathedral.

Rossano Cathedral (Italian: Duomo di Rossano, Cattedrale di Maria Santissima Achiropita) is a Roman Catholic cathedral in Rossano, a frazione of Corigliano-Rossano, Calabria, southern Italy, dedicated to the Blessed Virgin Mary as Maria Santissima Acheropita. It is the seat of the Archbishop of Rossano-Cariati, and previously of the Bishops and Archbishops of Rossano.

== History and description ==
The cathedral was built in the 11th century, with substantial reconstruction in the 18th and 19th centuries. It has a central nave and two side-aisles, terminating in three apses. The bell tower and the baptismal font date from the 14th century, while the other artworks and furnishings are of the 17th and 18th centuries.

== Maria Santissima Acheropita ==
The cathedral houses an ancient image of the Madonna Acheropita, an image of the Madonna and Child supposedly discovered in the cathedral plaster and not painted by human hand, which is dated to somewhere between about 580 and the first half of the 8th century.

== Rossano Gospels ==
In the sacristy in 1879 was discovered the Codex Purpureus Rossanensis ("Rossano Gospels"), a Greek evangeliary of the 5th or 6th century of Middle Eastern origin (probably Antioch), which was probably brought to Rossano by a monk taking refuge from the Arab invasions of the Middle East during the 9th and 10th centuries.

The manuscript comprises 188 leaves of parchment dyed purple containing the Gospels of Matthew and Mark and the Epistula ad Carpianum (a letter from Eusebius of Caesarea to a Christian named Carpianus). Although it is mutilated and anonymous, the manuscript is perhaps the most representative testimony of the Byzantine connections of Rossano. The texts are in gold and silver ink, with 15 miniatures showing the most important moments in the life and preaching of Jesus.
