= Chiesa della Panaghia =

Church in Calabria, Italy

Coordinates: 39.575144°N 16.636524°E

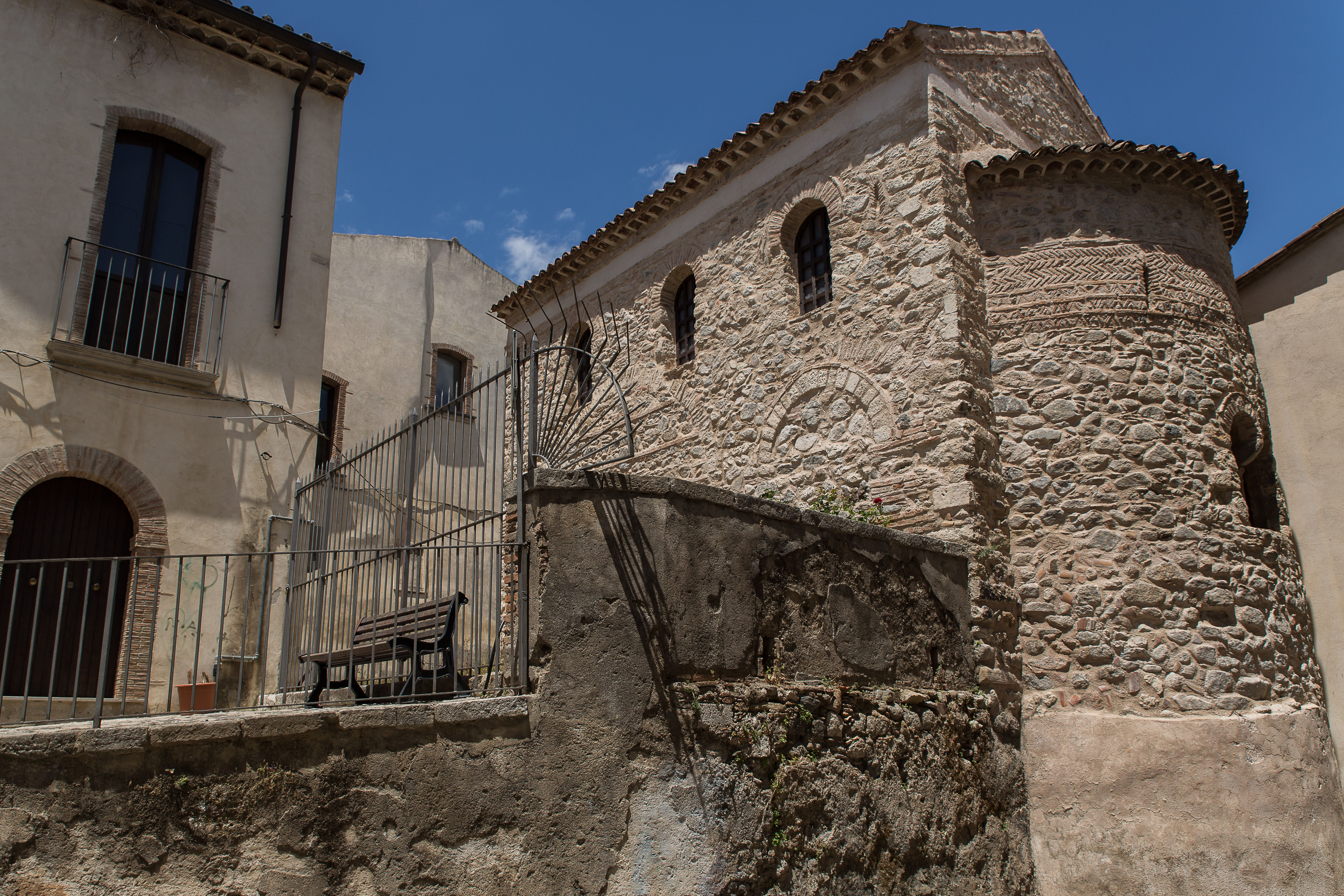
Chiesa della Panaghia

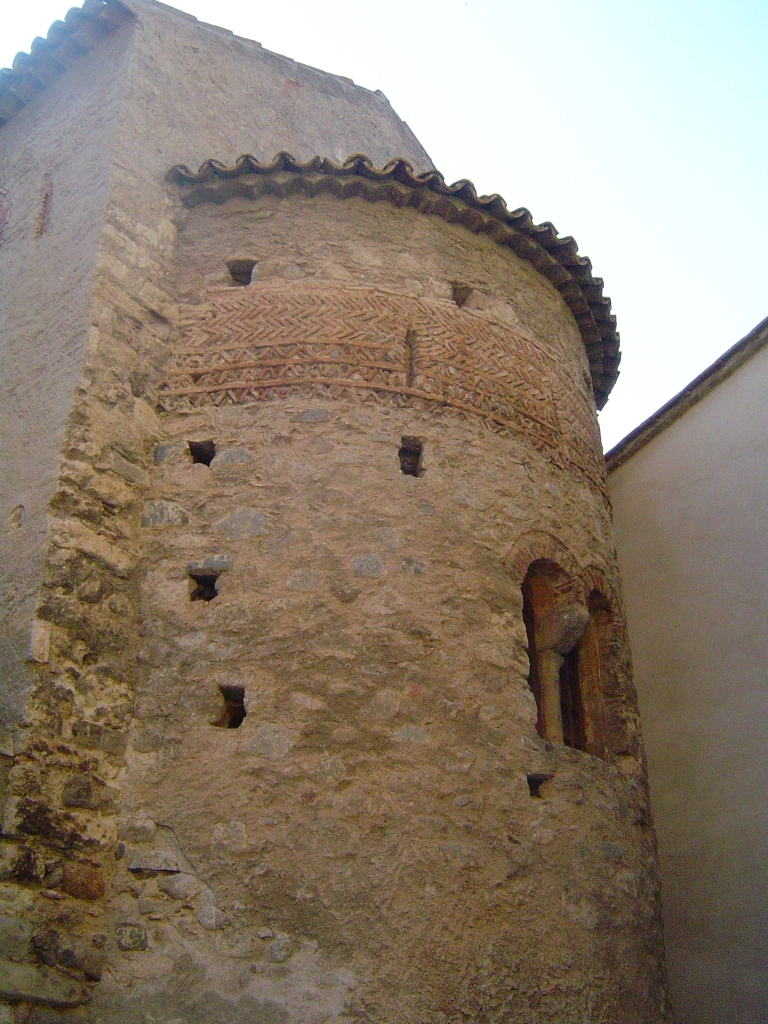
Semicircular apse

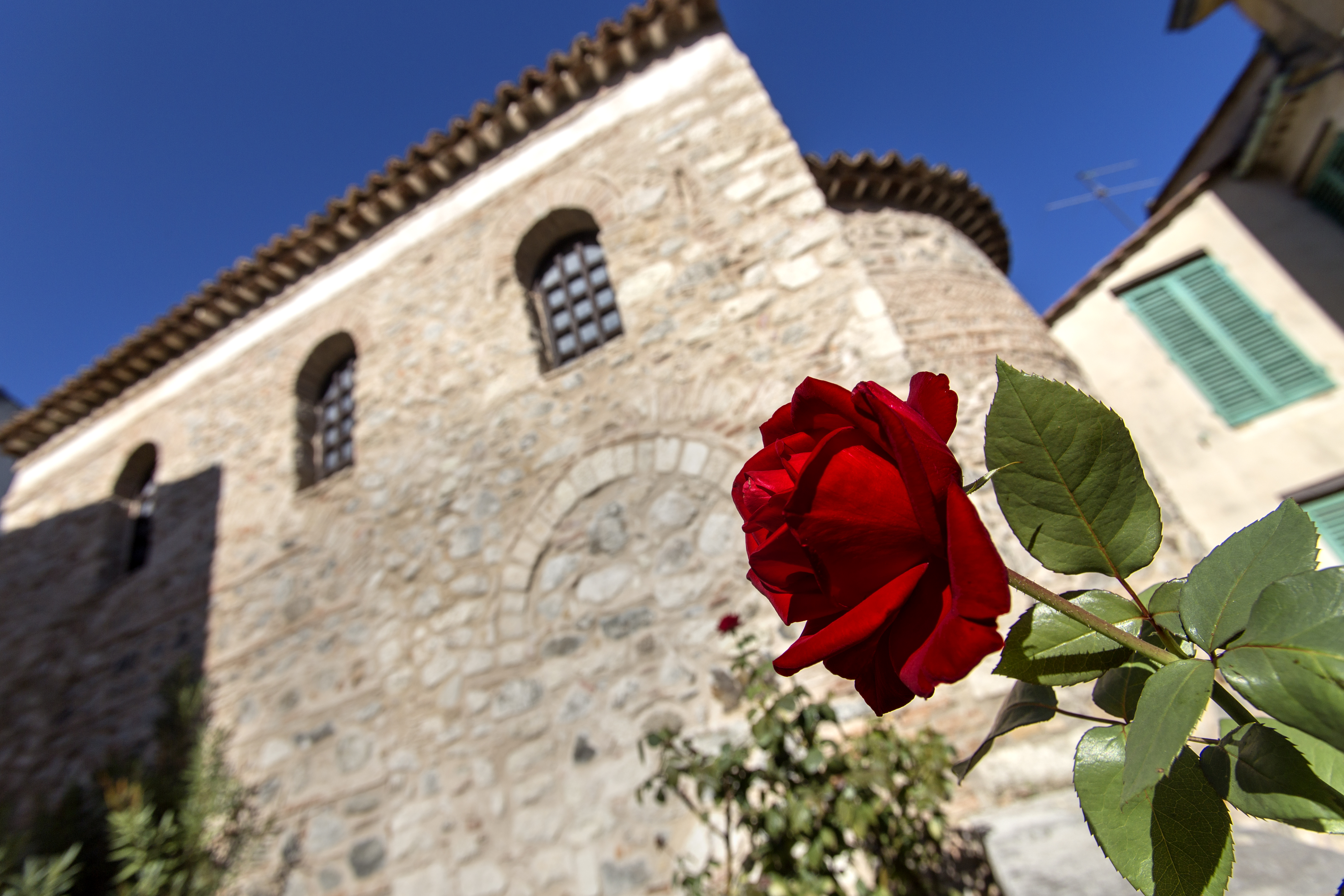
Sideview of the church

Panaghia is a small Byzantine church situated in the old town centre of Rossano, a frazione of Corigliano-Rossano, Calabria, southern Italy.

== Etymology ==
"Panagia" derives from the ancient Greek pan- (whole) and ághios (holy), meaning "All-Holy". Since the church was built in the honor of Maria Tutta Santa, Panaghia would be best translated as "All Saint".

== Description ==
The church was built in the 11th century; it has got just one nave and an apse with a mullioned window. Inside the church, there are two frescoes: one picturing Basil of Caesarea and the other (14th century) John Chrysostom.

== History ==
In October 2017, the Panaghia church exhibited images from the Connected Open Heritage, a project led by Wikimedia Italia in collaboration with Wikimedia Sweden and UNESCO.
