= Mario Sassi =

17th-century Italian Catholic bishop

Most Reverend Mario Sassi
- Archbishop of Rossano
- Church: Catholic Church
- Archdiocese: Archdiocese of Rossano
- In office: 1612–1615
- Predecessor: Lucio Sanseverino
- Successor: Girolamo Pignatelli

Orders
- Consecration: 9 December 1612 by Fabrizio Verallo

Personal details
- Died: 9 January 1615 Rossano, Italy

Mario Sassi (died 1615) was a Roman Catholic prelate who served as Archbishop of Rossano (1612–1615).

== Biography ==
On 26 November 1612, Mario Sassi was appointed during the papacy of Pope Paul V as Archbishop of Rossano. On 9 December 1612, he was consecrated bishop by Fabrizio Verallo, Bishop of San Severo, with Antonio d'Aquino, Bishop of Sarno, and Francesco Cennini de' Salamandri, Bishop of Amelia, serving as co-consecrators. He served as Archbishop of Rossano until his death on 9 January 1615.

== External links and additional sources ==
- Cheney, David M. "Archdiocese of Rossano-Cariati". Catholic-Hierarchy.org. (for Chronology of Bishops)
- Chow, Gabriel. "Archdiocese of Rossano-Cariati (Italy)". GCatholic.org. (for Chronology of Bishops)

Catholic Church titles
Preceded by Lucio Sanseverino	Archbishop of Rossano; 1612–1615	Succeeded by Girolamo Pignatelli
