= Bartholomew of Grottaferrata =

Saint Bartholomew of Grottaferrata

Abbot and Confessor
- Born: 981 AD; Rossano, Theme of Calabria, Byzantine Empire
- Died: November 11, 1055 (aged 74); Saint Mary Abbey in Grottaferrata, County of Tusculum, Papal States
- Venerated in: Roman Catholic Church; Eastern Orthodox Church; Anglican Communion
- Major shrine: Abbey of Grottaferrata, Rome, Italy
- Feast: November 11

Bartholomew of Grottaferrata (Italian: San Bartolomeo il Giovane) (Rossano, c. 970 – Grottaferrata, November 11, 1055) or Bartholomew the Younger was an Italo-Greek abbot at the monastery at Grottaferrata.

Like Nilus the Younger, Bartholomew was of Greek heritage. He was also a personal disciple of the founder of the abbey Nilus the Younger. He would in time be Nilus' third successor in the position of abbot. When he succeeded Nilus as abbot, he supervised the completion of the abbey, of which he is considered the second founder. Under his administration, which continued for some forty years, the monastery established a firm basis which would allow it to continue to this day.

Bartholomew the Younger was also a hymn-writer and noted calligrapher like his teacher. He is also described as having a very sympathetic nature, and being unable to see anyone suffer without giving that party comfort.

He is regarded as a saint, with a feast day of November 11.

== See also ==
- Abbazia del Patire

== Bibliography ==
- Donald Attwater and Catherine Rachel John, "The Penguin Dictionary of Saints," 3rd edition, New York: Penguin Books, 1993, ISBN 0-14-051312-4.
- Santa Maria de Grottaferrata (in Italian)
