= Abbazia del Patire =

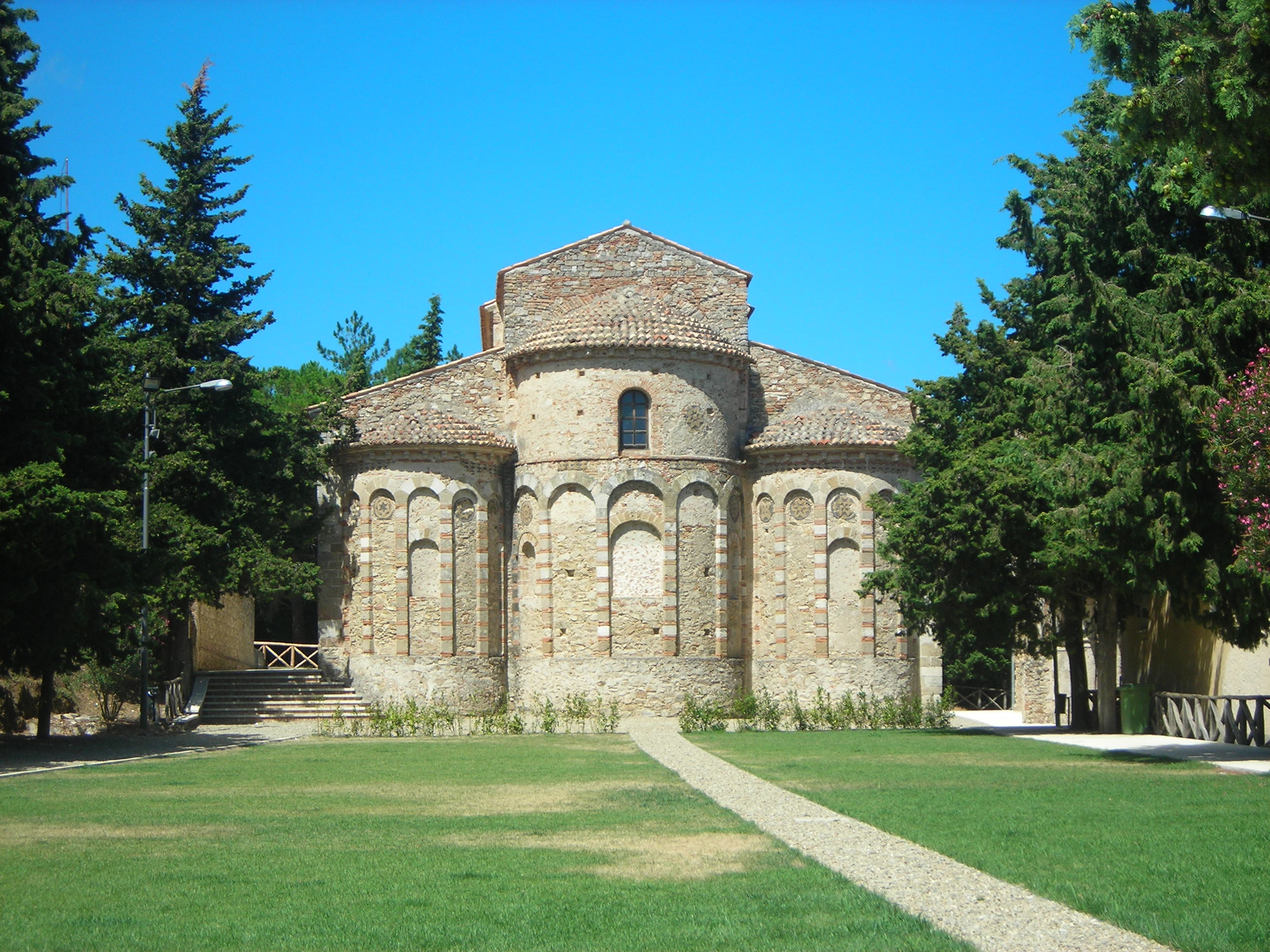
- Abbazia del Patire
- 39.5718°N 16.5698°E
- Location: Corigliano-Rossano
- Country: Italy
- Denomination: Roman Catholic

History
- Status: Abbey
- Dedication: Mary, mother of Jesus

Architecture
- Functional status: Active

Administration
- Diocese: Roman Catholic Archdiocese of Rossano-Cariati

The Abbazia di Santa Maria del Patire (in English, St Mary of Patir Abbey) is a church and monastery in Rossano, a frazione of Corigliano-Rossano, Calabria, southern Italy. It was founded in 1095 by Bartholomew of Simeri. It was dedicated to Saint Mary Hodegetria, although it is known as Saint Mary of Patir, which later became Patire, according to the popular pronunciation.

== Architecture ==
The church has a basilica plan with three apses that faces east. It is believed to be built over an earlier Byzantine church. The interior portion of the church has three naves that are divided by sandstone columns (no capitals). There are four decorative columns in presbytery area
