= Oratory of San Marco, Rossano =

Oratory in Rossano, Italy

Coordinates: 39.5713°N 16.6364°E

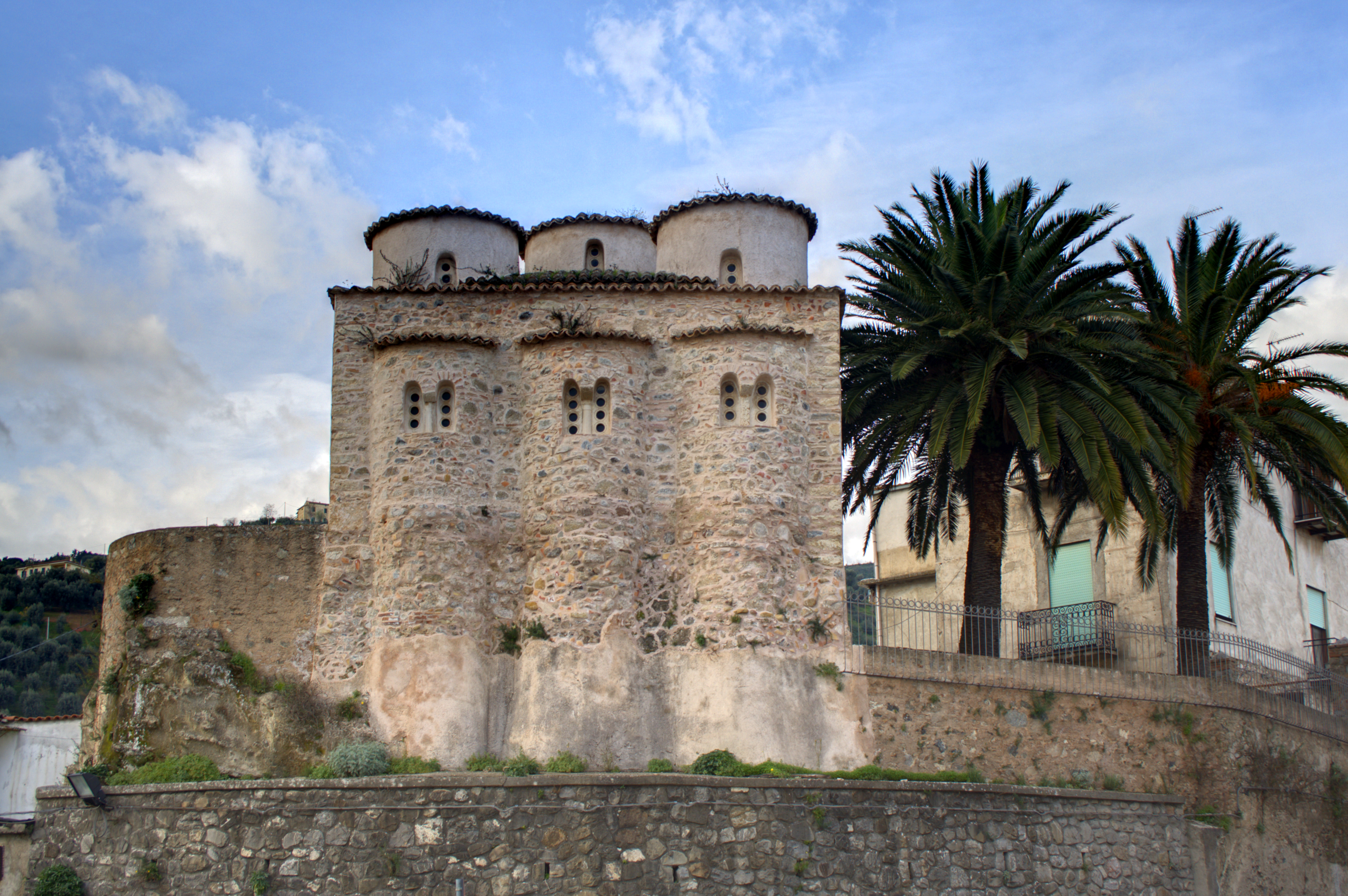
Oratory of San Marco

The Oratory of San Marco ("Saint Mark") is a Byzantine-style oratory situated in the old town centre of Rossano, a frazione of Corigliano-Rossano, Calabria, southern Italy.

== Description ==
The church was built in the 10th century by St. Nilus the Younger as a place of retirement for nearby eremite monks and is one of the most important testimonies to Byzantine art in Italy. It is the most ancient monument in the city and was originally dedicated to St. Anastasia. It has a Greek cross plan with five characteristic domes on cylindrical drums and, in the past, the entire building was supported by very thin columns then these were covered with cement after restoration works. Between 1928 and 1934, during the restoration works, a fragment of a fresco picturing a Virgin Hodegetria was discovered.
