= Giacomo Della Ratta =

Most Reverend Giacomo Della Ratta
- Archbishop of Benevento
- Church: Catholic Church
- Archdiocese: Archdiocese of Benevento
- In office: 1451–1460
- Predecessor: Astorgio Agnesi
- Successor: Alessio de Cesari
- Previous post: Archbishop of Rossano (1447–1451)

Giacomo Della Ratta was a Roman Catholic prelate who served as Archbishop of Benevento (1451–1460) and Archbishop of Rossano (1447–1451).

== Biography ==
On 13 Oct 1451, Giacomo Della Ratta was appointed during the papacy of Pope Nicholas V as Archbishop of Benevento. He served as Archbishop of Benevento until his resignation in 1460.

== External links and additional sources ==
- Cheney, David M. "Archdiocese of Benevento". Catholic-Hierarchy.org. (for Chronology of Bishops) ^{[self-published]}
- Chow, Gabriel. "Archdiocese of Benevento (Italy)". GCatholic.org. (for Chronology of Bishops) ^{[self-published]}

Catholic Church titles
| Preceded by Nicola de Martino | Archbishop of Rossano; 1447–1451 | Succeeded by Domenico de Lagonessa |
| Preceded by Astorgio Agnesi | Archbishop of Benevento; 1451–1460 | Succeeded by Alessio de Cesari |
