= Isabela de Rosis =

Isabella de Rosis

Personal life
- Born: Rossano Calabria, Italy
- Died: August 11, 1911 (aged 69); Naples, Italy

Religious life
- Religion: Roman Catholic

Madre Isabella de Rosis (1842–1911) was an Italian religious sister and foundress of the congregation of the Reparatrix Sisters of the Sacred Heart. In December 2005, Pope Benedict XVI proclaimed her as a Venerable Servant of God, the first step on the road to canonization.

== Biography ==
Mother Isabella de Rosis was born on 9 June 1842. Her parents were Baron Domiziano de Rosis and Baroness Gabriella Francesca Berlingieri, nobles of Rossano, Calabria, Italy. The eldest of nine children, she was sent to the Royal boarding school of Saint Clare in Naples, an exclusive school for the nobility, at the age of 8. While in the boarding school she lived the daily life of the sisters, shared their life of prayer, and practiced mortification and penance. She was an example of piety, firmness, discipline, and silence, and loved always to be recollected.

At the age of 15 Isabella consecrated herself to the Most Sacred Heart of Jesus with the Formula of Saint Margaret Mary Alacoque, promising love and reparation. She realised this saint's spirituality during her stay in the boarding school of St. Clare. Her years at the boarding school had a decisive impact on her. At the boarding school, she obtained the basis of her spiritual formation and were her religious vocation matured.

Between the years 1860–1874 she tried to enter in the different religious institutes devoted to the Sacred Heart; the Pia Unione of the Handmaids, Oblates of the Sacred Heart, Daughters of Charity in Paris to name a few. Finally, after receiving spiritual direction from her confessor, she founded the Congregation of the Reparatrix Sisters of the Sacred Heart on 24 October 1875.

=== Spirituality ===
Her devotion to the Sacred Heart symbolized the spiritual journey that Mother Isabella travelled and embodied the essence of this devotion. Her spirituality represented her most typical expressions: love, the practice of virtue, prayer, consecration, penance and reparation.

She lived not for herself but for the Lord in a continuous attempt to forget herself in order to please God, always keeping her heart free from the world’s many attractions and enticements. She occupied herself solely with the thought of serving God and the complete fulfillment of His will, in order that Jesus must reign as absolute sovereign in her heart.

She was determined to seek perfection with a firm resolution and not content herself with a comfortable life but rather with a holy life attained through the practice of all the virtues, thus her insistence in living in meditation, mortification and withdrawal. Then she wished to be the “victim of love”. To make amends for man countless offenses against the infinite goodness of God.

Mother Isabella accepted everything from the hands of the Lord, endured everything with love, remained always faithful to the ideals of reparation. Years later, she was relieved of the burden of Superior General when she found herself alone and abandoned in the Mother House at Naples. There she wrote “Isabella, may your life in this corner so remote in the world be peaceful: for such is the Lord’s will”.

=== The concept of reparation ===
The concept of reparation shows up in all of her writings as a lifelong commitment and as a motive of joy. For the essence of reparation is love, which allows one to bear the cross together with Jesus without ever feeling its weight, experiencing only joy.

The intense moments of the Reparatrix Spirituality:

- Contemplation of Jesus’ passion, death and resurrection
- Eucharistic adoration
- Holy Mass
- Holy Communion

To this ideal, she desired that her institute be a witness to the name that she bestowed upon it: Reparatrix Sisters of the Sacred Heart.
