= Andrea Cassone =

Andrea Cassone (April 29, 1929 – April 12, 2010) was the Catholic archbishop of the Archdiocese of Rossano-Cariati, Italy.

Ordained on December 22, 1951, Cassone was named archbishop on March 26, 1992, and was consecrated on May 9, 1992. Archbishop Cassone retired on May 6, 2006.
