= Territorial Abbacy of Saint Mary of Grottaferrata =

Eastern Catholic jurisdiction in Italy

Territorial Abbacy of Saint Mary of Grottaferrata Abbatia Territorialis Beatissimæ Mariæ Cryptæferratæ Santa Maria di Grottaferrata
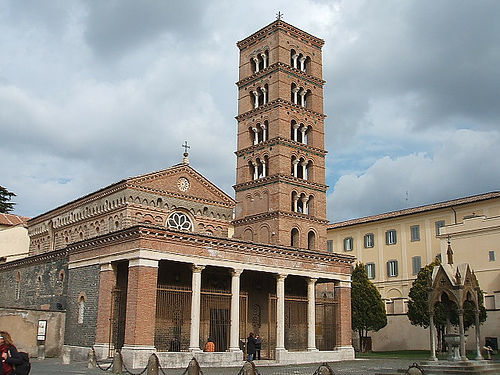
- Cathedral of Exarchial Monastery of St. Mary of Grottaferrata

Location
- Country: Italy
- Ecclesiastical province: Holy See

Statistics
- Parishes: 1
- Churches: 1
- Schools: 1
- Members: 87

Information
- Denomination: Catholic Church
- Sui iuris church: Italo-Albanian Catholic Church
- Rite: Byzantine Rite
- Established: 1937
- Cathedral: Exarchial Monastery of St. Mary of Grottaferrata
- Patron saint: Nilo da Rossano
- Secular priests: 10

Current leadership
- Pope: Leo XIV
- Apostolic Exarch: Manuel Nin

Website
- abbaziasannilo.org

The Territorial Abbacy of Santa Maria of Grottaferrata is an ecclesiastical jurisdiction which administers the Byzantine Rite Abbey of Saint Mary in Grottaferrata located in Grottaferrata, Rome, Lazio, Italy.

The Abbacy and its territory are stauropegic, that is, directly subordinate to a primate or synod, rather than to a local bishop. It is the only remnant Eastern Christian monasticism of Byzantine tradition in Italy, further brought to the monastery by the Italo-Albanians, the only ones to historically preserve the Byzantine rite on the peninsula. It is also the only monastery of the Italian Basilian Order of Grottaferrata, (abbreviated O.S.B.I.), a religious order of the Italo-Albanian Greek Catholic Church. The abbot ordinary is also the superior general of the Italian Basilian Order of Grottaferrata. The Abbacy was under the authority of Bishop (now Cardinal) Marcello Semeraro since Pope Francis named him Apostolic Administrator of the Abbacy on 4 November 2013. On 31 January 2026, Pope Leo XIV appointed Bishop Manuel Nin Güell as the abbot.

== History ==
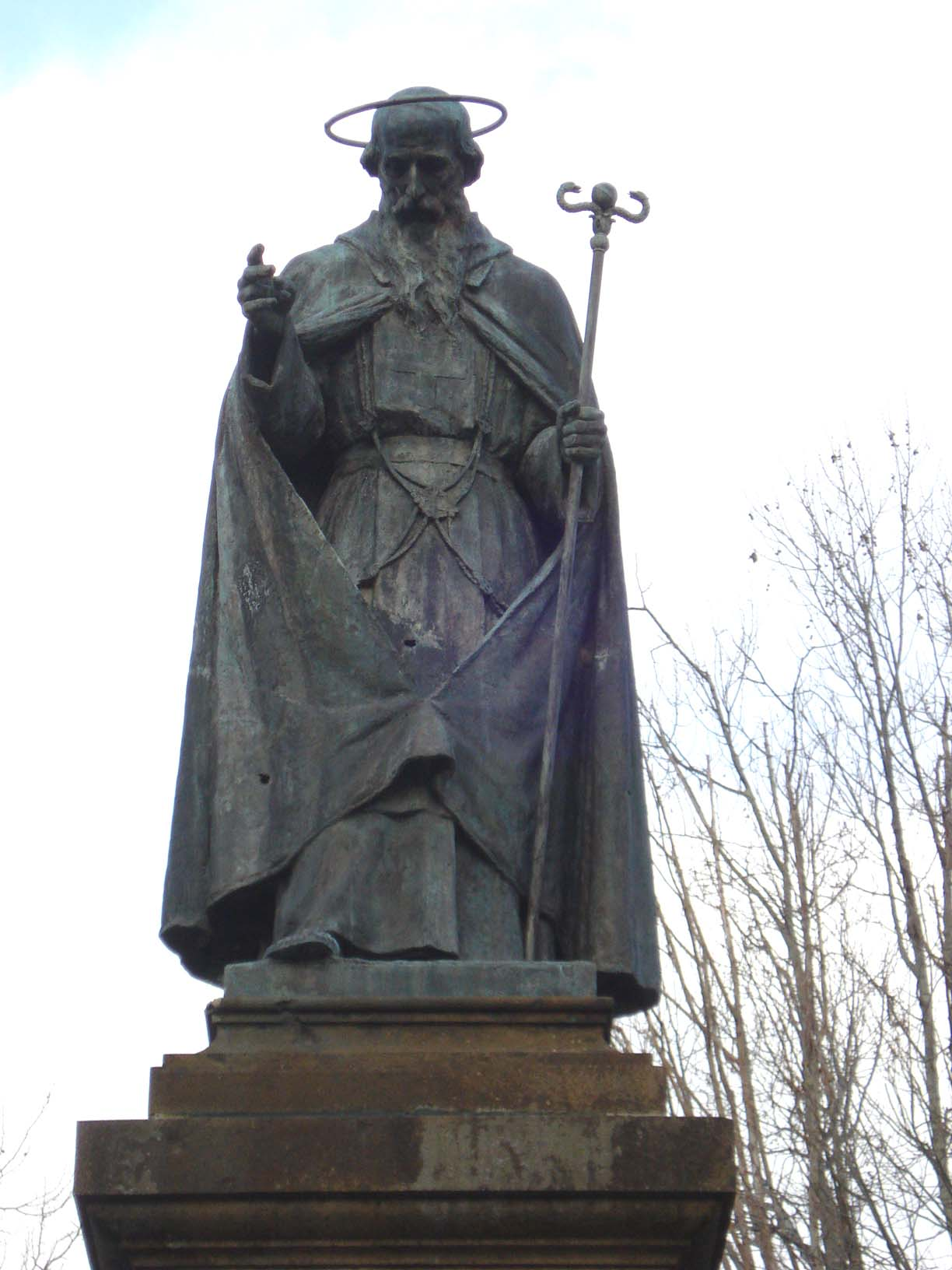
Statue of St Nilus at Grottaferrata

The abbey was founded in 1004 by St. Nilus of Rossano, an Italo-Byzantine monk from Calabria, on what was believed to be the site where Cicero owned a villa and wrote his Quaestiones tusculanae. When Nilus was once asked by a Latin Rite monk about the criticisms of the Cluniac Reforms and the Roman Rite emanating from adherents of the Photian schism in Constantinople, Nilus replied, "However we differ, both do all things for the glory of God. Don't allow yourselves to be disturbed by these criticisms."

The monastery has remained in continuous operation since then, but, particularly following the defeat of the uprising led by Skanderbeg and the conquest of the Albanian people by the Ottoman Empire, vocations were sought less and less from local Italian people of the Latin rite, but increasingly among the growing number of Italo-Albanian refugee communities in southern Italy.

On 1 November 1571, the Italian Basilian Order of Grottaferrata was formally organized and established as part of the Counter-Reformation strengthening of the Eastern Catholic Churches by Cardinal Giulio Antonio Santorio. Among the Albanian refugee communities villages of the Mezzogiorno, the monks of Grottaferrata set up many daughter foundations, particularly throughout Sicily and Calabria.

It is, however, the only one of these many Italo-Greek or Byzantine-Catholic monasteries that survives. Throughout the Medieval period and into the Baroque era, the Byzantine rite or Greek rite had by now almost completely disappeared and latent, with a strong or complete Latinization of the rites, as it was throughout Italy, which had been Latin Rite for centuries and no longer under Byzantine influence.

Beginning under Bernardo Tanucci in the 18th-century Kingdom of the Two Sicilies and continuing under the newly constituted Kingdom of Italy during the Risorgimento in 1866, all others that had survived were closed down and their lands seized and sold when, influenced by the anti-religious currents of The Englightenment, local governments banned religious orders and expelled their members. Only Grottaferrata monastery, which was considered a national monument, was allowed to keep resident monks as its guardians. In the course of time, the Italian secular authorities allowed these monks increasing independence.

From 1864 to 1867, the Italian Basilians of Grottaferrata were involved in the initiative for the canonization of Saint Josaphat Kuntsevych. Hieromonk Nicola Contieri, then-superior of the abbey, was assigned as one of the three postulators for the cause. The abbey received one of the first relics of the saint, a portion of his right hand. From 18 to 20 October 1867, the Basilians of the abbey hosted three days of celebrations following the canonization.

In the 1880s, the Holy See ordered the Divine Liturgy offered at Grottaferrata purged of all Latin Rite borrowings that had been introduced over the centuries. As the one Byzantine Catholic monastery in Italy not closed down, the monks of Grottaferrata prevented the death of their monastic traditions and have contributed to its rebirth and expansion. As Italo-Albanian refugee monks arrived from the other closed down religious houses replaced the old pro-Latinisation guard in Grottaferrata, they contributed to the rebirth of the Abbey and became notable as palaeographers, liturgists, and musicologists, as well as the main Albanologists and Byzantinists of the period, which has played a major role too in the study of Albanian history, Albanian literature, and in the Albanian diaspora. One regular visitor to Grottaferrata during the early 20th-century was Leonid Feodorov, who went on in 1917 to become the first Exarch of the Russian Greek Catholic Church.

These same monks were active promoters of reunion between West and East, with missionary evangelization of ethnicities in the Balkans that had converted to Islam under Ottoman Turkish rule, particularly after 1912 in newly Independent Albania. The effects of this mission, generally welcomed in a positive way before communism in Albania, quickly created a very close religious and cultural bridge between the Albanian-speaking refugee communities of southern Italy and the Catholic Church in Albania, resulting in the resurrection of the Albanian Greek-Catholic Church and the ordination of various missionary priests.

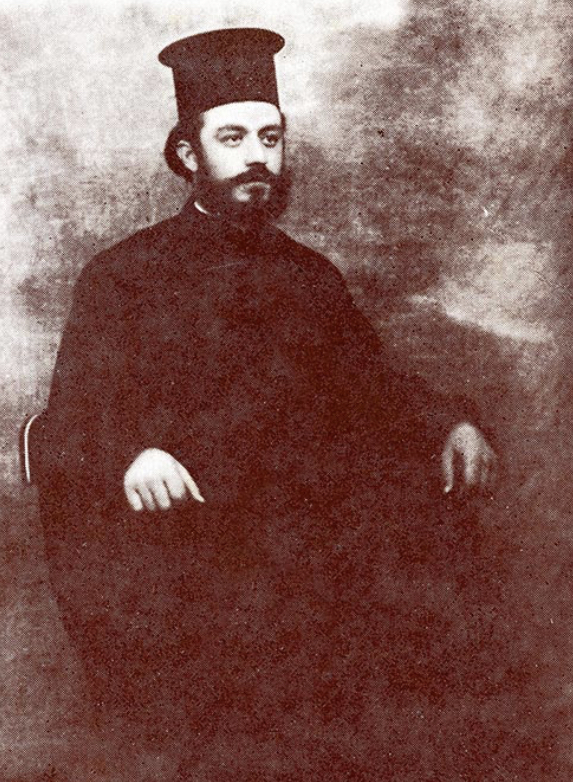
Blessed Josif Papamihali (1912-1948).

Among these was Blessed Josif Papamihali (1912-1948), who graduated from the Pontifical Greek College of Saint Athanasius in Rome and deeply loved the Abbey and the culture of the Italo-Albanian people. Papamihali went to become a confessor and apostle of Eastern Catholicism, who was persecuted, arrested, sentenced to a labour camp, where he was buried alive by his guards after falling from exhaustion in a marsh. After the fall of communism in Albania, he was beatified in Shkodër along with thirty-seven other fellow Albanian Catholic Martyrs on 5 November 2016.

On 26 September 1937, the abbey was made a territorial abbacy.

The Territorial Abbey also operates a rectory church in central Rome, Saint Basil at the Gardens of Sallust. Abbot Apolemone Agreste, whose coat of arms appears on the arches within, had a church dedicated to Saint Basil built on St. Basil Street in Rome, not far from the Piazza Grimana, now the Piazza Barberini. Attached to it was a hospice. The monks of the Order of St. Basil had it restored in 1682, as an inscription on the doorway testifies.

== See also ==
- Arbëreshë people
- Byzantine Rite
- Eastern Catholic Churches
- Italo-Albanian Catholic Church
