= Grottaferrata =

- Comune
- Comune di Grottaferrata
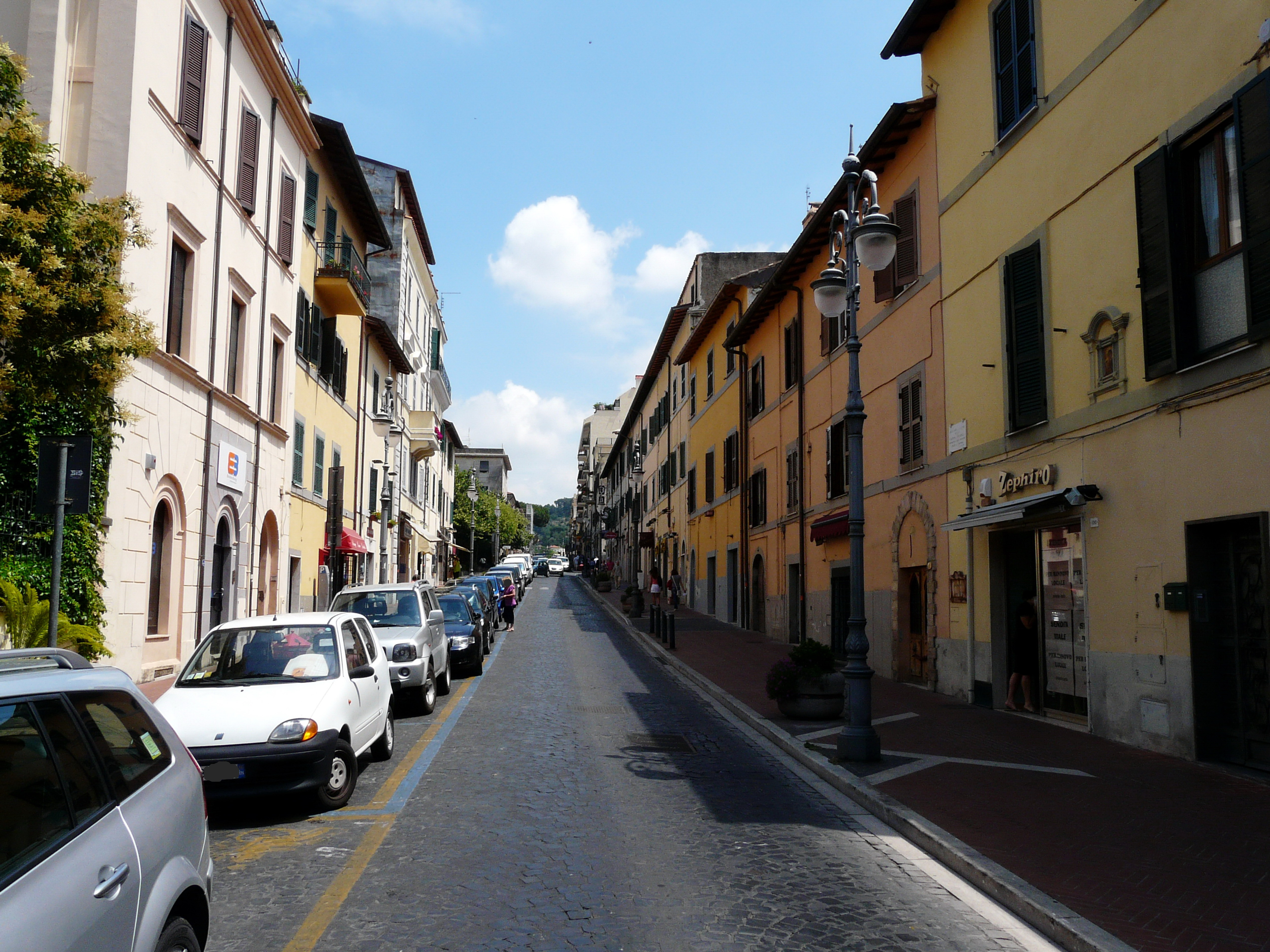
- Corso del Popolo

- Coat of arms

- Location within Italy Location within Lazio
- Coordinates: 41°47′18″N 12°40′18″E
- Country: Italy
- Region: Lazio
- Metropolitan city: Rome (RM)
- Frazioni: Molara, Squarciarelli, Valleviolata, Valle Marciana

Government
  - Mayor: Mirko Di Bernardo

Area
  - Total: 18.4 km^{2} (7.1 sq mi)
- Elevation: 329 m (1,079 ft)

Population (31 August 2020)
  - Total: 20,636
  - Density: 1,120/km^{2} (2,900/sq mi)
- Demonym: Grottaferratesi
- Time zone: UTC+1 (CET)
  - Summer (DST): UTC+2 (CEST)
- Postal code: 00046
- Dialing code: 06
- Patron saint: St. Nilus the Younger
- Saint day: September 26
- Website: Official website

Grottaferrata (Italian pronunciation: [ˌɡrɔttaferˈraːta, ˌɡro-]) is a comune (municipality) in the Metropolitan City of Rome Capital, situated on the lower slopes of the Alban Hills, 20 kilometres (12 miles) southeast of Rome. It has grown up around the Abbey of Santa Maria di Grottaferrata, founded in 1004. Nearby communes include Frascati, Rocca di Papa, Marino and Rome.

== History ==
The history of Grottaferrata identifies largely with that of the Basilian Monastery of Santa Maria, founded here in 1004 by Saint Nilus the Younger. The founding legend narrates that, at the spot where the abbey now stands, the Virgin Mary appeared and bade him found a church in her honour.

From Gregory, the powerful Count of Tusculum, father of Popes Benedict VIII and John XIX, Nilus obtained the site, which had been a Roman villa, where among the ruins there remained a low edifice of opus quadratum that had been a tomb but had been converted to a Christian oratory in the fourth century. Its iron window grates gave the site the name, first of Cryptaferrata ("ironbound crypt") then of Grottaferrata, commemorated in the coat-of-arms of the commune. From the site, a Roman bronze of a man and a cow attracted the antiquarian attention of Frederick II, Holy Roman Emperor, who had the group removed to Lucera.

Nilus died soon afterwards (26 December 1005) in the Sant' Agata monastery in Tusculum. The monastic building was carried out by his successors, especially the fourth abbot, Saint Bartholomew, who is usually considered the second founder. Building materials scavenged from the ruined villa were incorporated into the new structure, marble columns, sections of carved cornice, and blocks of the volcanic stone called peperino. The sanctuary was complete enough in 1024 to be consecrated by the Tusculan Pope John XIX. It was dedicated to the Madonna on 17 December 1024.

The high repute of the monks attracted many gifts; eleventh- and thirteenth-century mosaics remain, but of the ambitious ensemble of Cosmatesque inlay, only the polychrome stone paving remains. The abbey's possessions in lands were numerous and widespread, and in 1131 King Roger II of Sicily made the abbot Baron of Rossano with an extensive fief. Between the 12th and 15th centuries the monastery suffered from the continual strife of warring factions: Romans and Tusculans, Guelphs and Ghibellines, popes and antipopes, Colonna and Orsini. From 1163 till the destruction of Tusculum in 1191, the greater part of the monastic community sought refuge in a dependency of the abbey, the Benedictine protocaenobium of Subiaco.

In the middle of the 13th century the Emperor Frederick II made the abbey his headquarters during the siege of Rome, while in 1378 Breton and Gascon mercenaries held it for the antipope Clement VII. The fifteenth century saw the bloody feuds of the Colonna and the Orsini raging round the walls. According to the humanist Ambrogio Traversari, in 1432 the appearance of the abbey was that of a barracks rather than a monastery.

In 1462 began a line of non-resident abbots in commendam, fifteen in number, of whom all but one were cardinals. The most distinguished were the Greek Bessarion, Giulio della Rovere (afterwards Julius II), and the last of the line, Cardinal Consalvi, secretary of state to Pius VII. Cardinal Bessarion, himself a Basilian monk, increased the scanty and impoverished community and restored the church. Cardinal Giulio della Rovere, for more selfish motives, erected the castle and surrounded the whole monastery with the imposing fortifications that still exist. Cardinal Alessandro Farnese replaced the ceiling. Gian Lorenzo Bernini was commissioned by Cardinal Francesco Barberini to provide the high altar, completed in 1665.

Till 1608 the community was ruled by priors dependent on abbots in commendam, but in that year Grottaferrata became a member of the Basilian congregation founded by Gregory XIII. The revenues of the community were separated from those of the commendatory abbots, and the first of a series of triennially appointed regular abbots was appointed. The triennial system survived the suppression of the commendam and lasted till the end of the nineteenth century, with one break from 1834 to 1870, when priors were appointed by the Holy See. In 1901, new constitutions came into force and Arsenio Pellegrini was installed as the first perpetual regular abbot since 1462.

The Greek Rite which was brought to Grottaferrata by St. Nilus had lost its native character by the end of the twelfth century, but was restored by order of Leo XIII in 1881. The Basilian abbey has always been a home of Greek learning, and Greek hymnography flourished there long after the art had died out within the Byzantine Empire. Monastic studies were revived under Cardinal Bessarion and again in 1608.

On 11 August 1901 the first electricity reached Grottaferrata from the hydroelectric plant in S. Bartholomew fall.

On 26 September 1937, the monastery was made a territorial abbacy of the Italo-Albanian Catholic Church under the title Territorial Abbacy of Saint Mary of Grottaferrata.

== Main sights ==
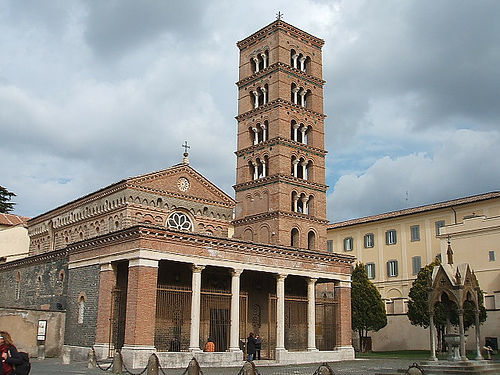
Façade of the abbey church

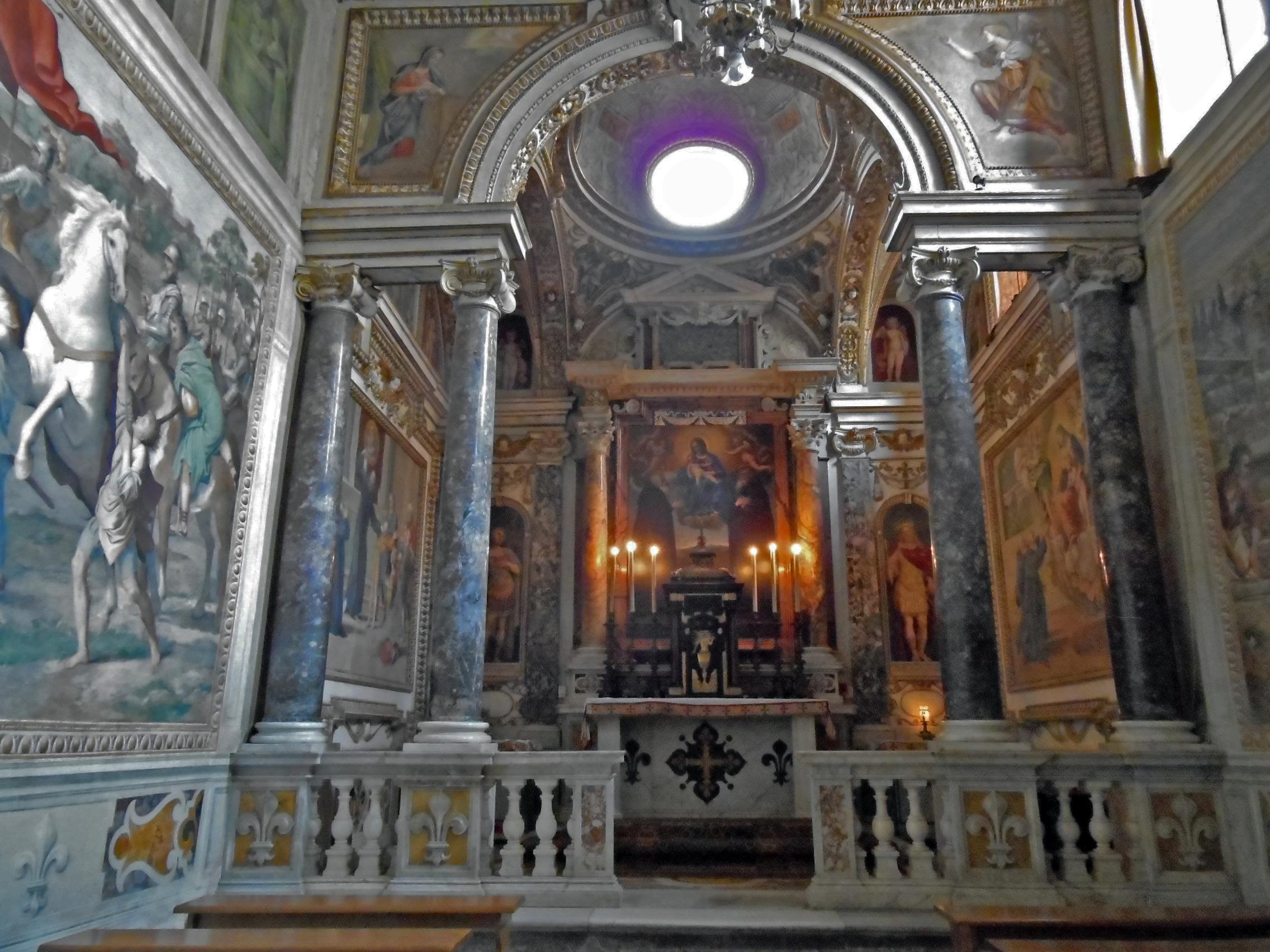
Cappella Farnese

The Abbey of Saint Mary of Grottaferrata has several courts, which lead to the famous portico designed by Antonio da Sangallo the Younger, with an arcade of nine bays supported by slender columns with Renaissance capitals.

Of the abbey church consecrated by John XIX in 1024, little can be seen in the interior except the mosaics in the narthex and over the triumphal arch, the medieval structures having been covered or destroyed during the "restorations" of various abbots in commendam. Some fragmentary thirteenth-century frescoes were revealed in a partial restoration of the church in 1904 to commemorate its novecentennial, when it was made a Roman basilica. The mosaics portray the Twelve Apostles sitting beside an empty throne, evoking Christ's ascent to Heaven. Domenichino's frescoes, commissioned by Cardinal Odoardo Farnese in 1608, can be seen in the chapel of St. Nilus. Annibale Carracci executed the altarpiece of the Madonna with Child with St. Nilus and St. Bartholomew.

The modern portico protects the ancient façade; the marble portal with a mosaic above it, an example of Italo-Byzantine art of the twelfth century. In the interior is a baptismal font supported on winged lions, of the tenth or eleventh centuries. Noteworthy also is the Romanesque campanile (twelfth century), with five storeys of tripartite arched windows.

The library of the Abbey, which contains some 50,000 volumes, has a paper conservation Laboratorio di Restauro, which was entrusted with the conservation of Leonardo's Codex Atlanticus from the Biblioteca Ambrosiana; the library houses writings of St. Nilus and his pupils and a rare copy of Alvise Cadamosto's collected travel accounts, printed in the early sixteenth century. The monastery's library also includes the largest collection of Greek-language manuscripts pre-dating the year 1600 found in a monastery anywhere in Western Europe. The founders of the monastery had come from Calabria and brought with them the tradition of Greek-speaking settlements in Southern Italy and Sicily. Of the more than 200 Greek language manuscripts in the collection, forty of them consist of music notation, most of which are written in the Byzantine Rite that pre-dated the reforms made to Byzantine music by John Koukouzeles in the 14th century. The library has many rare manuscripts of Byzantine music, some of which contain types of music and notation that eventually fell out of favor in the East and were not well preserved in that region.

Pope Benedict IX died and was buried in this abbey.

== International relations ==
Grottaferrata is twinned with:

- Vandœuvre-lès-Nancy, France
- Patmos, Greece
- Bethlehem, Palestine
- Bisignano, Italy
- Bracigliano, Italy
- Oria, Italy
- Rofrano, Italy
- Rossano, Italy
- Sant'Elia Fiumerapido, Italy
- San Mauro la Bruca, Italy

== Climate ==
The Köppen Climate Classification subtype for this climate is "Csa" (Mediterranean Climate).
