= Corigliano-Rossano =

- Comune
- Comune di Corigliano-Rossano
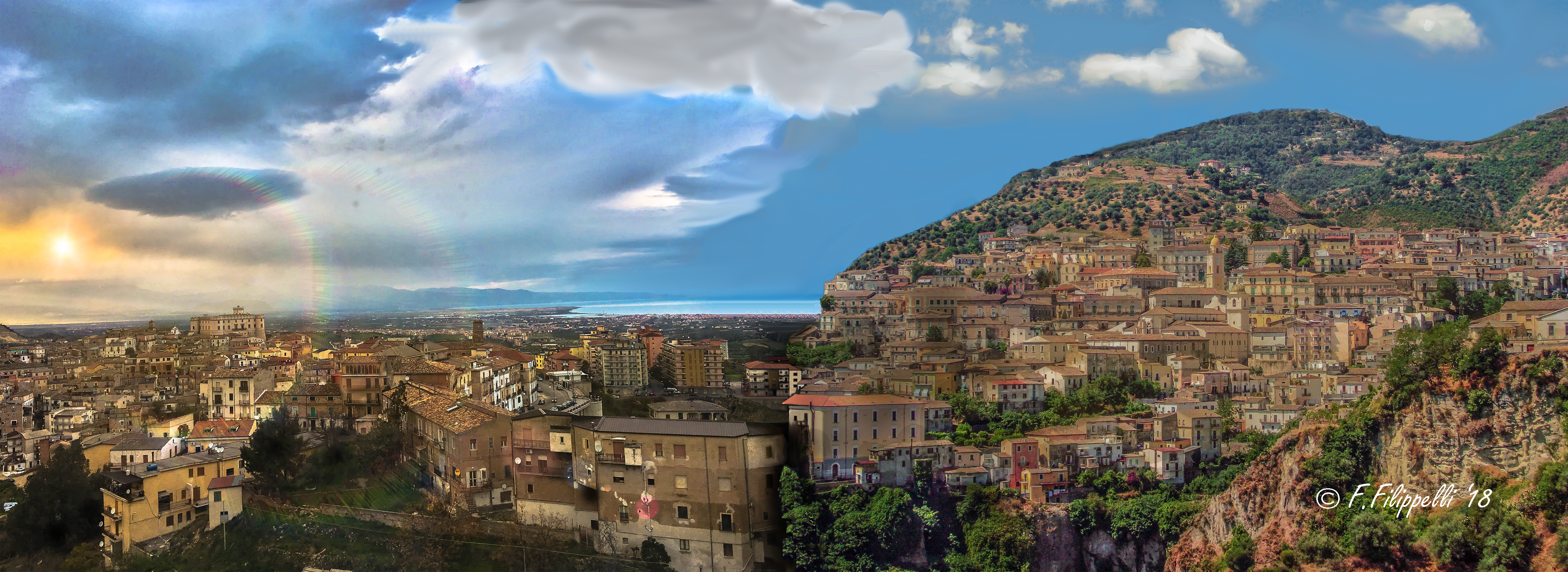

- Coat of arms

- Location within Italy Location within Calabria
- Coordinates: 39°34′N 16°38′E
- Country: Italy
- Region: Calabria
- Province: Cosenza (CS)
- Frazioni: Amarelli, Amica, Apollinara, Baraccone, Cantinella, Celadi, Ceradonna, Ciminata, Corigliano Calabro, Costa, Fabrizio Grande, Fabrizio Piccolo, Fermata Toscano, Forello, Fossa, Frasso, Lido Sant’Angelo, Mandria del Forno, Momena, Parco dei Principi, Pirro Malena, Petraro, Petra, Piana Caruso, Piana dei Venti, Piragineti, Rossano, Salici, San Nico, Santa Maria delle Grazie, Scalo, Schiavonea, Seggio, Simonetti, Thurio, Torricella, Torre Pinta, Toscano Ioele, Varia dei Franchi, Villaggio Frassa

Government
  - Mayor: Flavio Stasi (Independent)

Area
  - Total: 346.56 km^{2} (133.81 sq mi)

Population (2026)
  - Total: 74,403
  - Density: 214.69/km^{2} (556.04/sq mi)
- Demonym(s): Coriglianesi; Rossanesi
- Time zone: UTC+1 (CET)
  - Summer (DST): UTC+2 (CEST)
- Postal code: 87064
- Dialing code: 0983
- ISTAT code: 078157
- Patron saint: Francis of Paola and Nilus the Younger
- Website: Official website

Corigliano-Rossano is a city and comune (municipality) in the province of Cosenza in the region of Calabria in southern Italy. It was established on 31 March 2018 by the merger of Corigliano Calabro and Rossano. It has 74,403 inhabitants.

Corigliano-Rossano borders the municipalities of Acri, Calopezzati, Cassano all'Ionio, Crosia, Cropalati, Longobucco, Paludi, San Cosmo Albanese, San Demetrio Corone, San Giorgio Albanese, Spezzano Albanese, Tarsia, and Terranova da Sibari.

== Etymology ==
According to some interpretations, the toponym Corigliano derives from Latin Corellianum, meaning "Corellio farm"; according to other hypotheses, the name could be traced back to that of other toponyms of Southern Italy such as Corigliano d'Otranto, and therefore from the Byzantine Greek term "χωρίον" (transliterated choríon), respectively to the etymologically related term "χώρα" (chóra), with the meaning of village, town, farm, land or place, or oil village, from Greek choríon elàion.

The toponym Rossano, on the other hand, derives from Greek rusion, ρύσιον ("who saves") and akron, άκρον ("promontory", "height") from which the medieval versions Ruskia or Ruskiané (Ρουσκιανή) or Rusiànon (Ρουσιάνον, that is "the Scarlet" in Byzantine Greek); according to another hypothesis instead it derives from the Roman family name to which the government of the "Castrum" could have been entrusted and which would have given the name of "Roscianum" to the urban center.

== History ==
Following a referendum held on 22 October 2017, in which the yes to the merger got 61.4% to Corigliano Calabro and 94.1% to Rossano, the Regional Council of Calabria subsequently approved the regional law no. 2 on 2 February 2018, which established the new municipality of Corigliano-Rossano on 31 March.

== Geography ==
Corigliano-Rossano covers an area of 356.56 square kilometres (137.67 sq mi), is located in the eastern strip of the Sibari plain between the Sila and the Ionian coast.

The territory includes soils of different geological origins, with different characteristics (rocks, clays, sands), which correspond to different types of flora. From the landscape point of view, tree farmings dominate (olive groves, citrus groves and orchards). In areas close to the coast there are also pine forests. There are two monumental oak trees in the area (one English oak and one Quercus virgiliana).

== Demographics ==
As of 2026, the population is 74,403, of which 49.8% are male, and 50.2% are female. Minors make up 16.9% of the population, and seniors make up 20.6%.

Historical population

Year	Pop.	±%
1861	25,136	—
1871	24,509	−2.5%
1881	30,602	+24.9%
1901	28,733	−6.1%
1911	29,460	+2.5%
1921	32,544	+10.5%
1931	30,687	−5.7%
1936	31,678	+3.2%

Year	Pop.	±%
1951	41,427	+30.8%
1961	47,621	+15.0%
1971	55,954	+17.5%
1981	66,278	+18.5%
1991	69,309	+4.6%
2001	74,076	+6.9%
2011	74,848	+1.0%
2021	74,173	−0.9%

Source: ISTAT

=== Immigration ===
As of 2025, immigrants make up 12.0% of the population. The 5 largest foreign countries of birth are Romania, Germany, Morocco, Ukraine, and Pakistan.
