= Nilus the Younger =

Italian saint (910–1005)

Saint Nilus the Younger
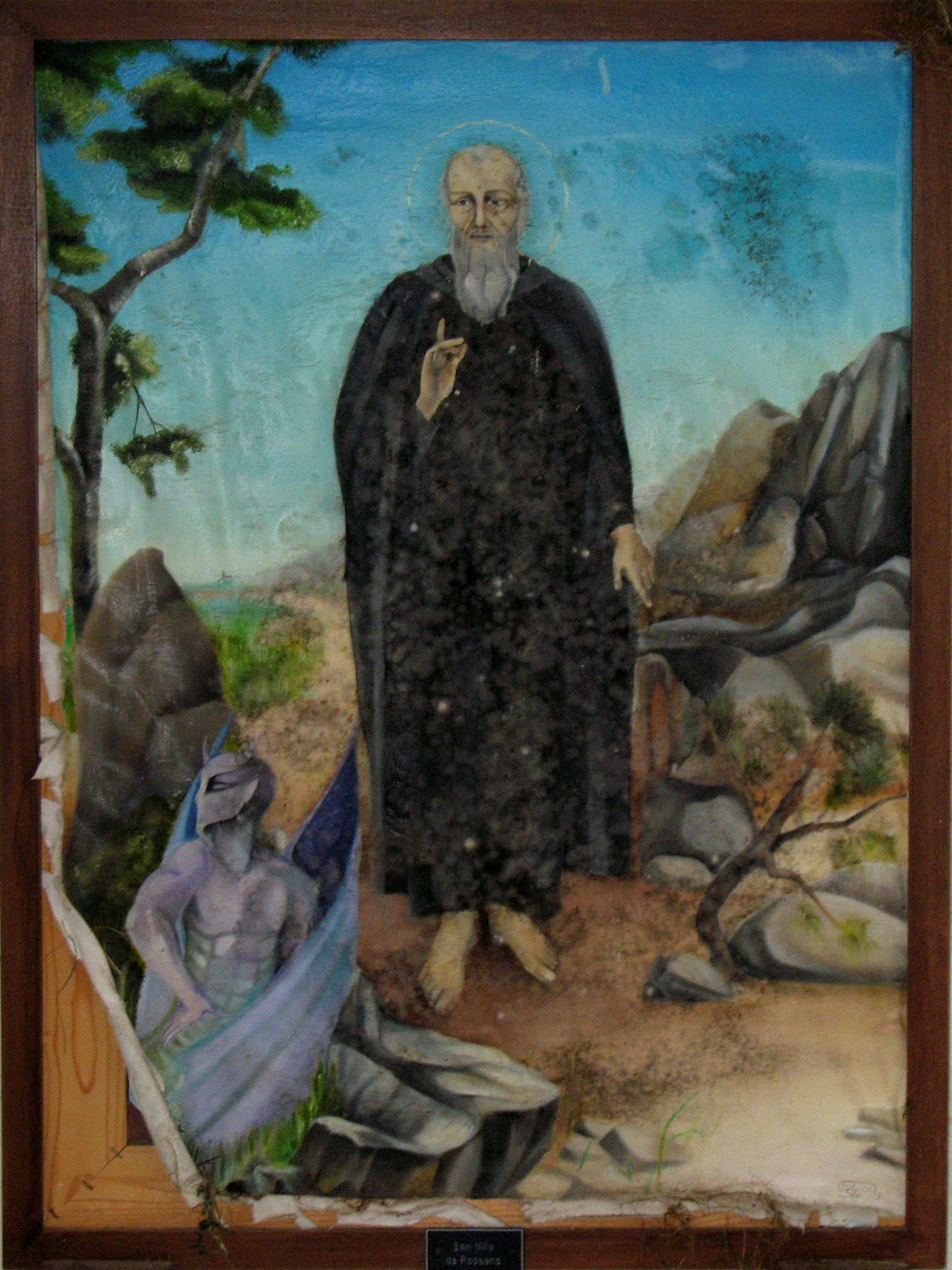
- Portrait of Nilus, Sanctuary of San Nicodemo in Mammola, which is dedicated to Saint Nicodemus of Mammola.

Abbot and Confessor
- Born: 910 AD; Rossano, Byzantine Theme of Calabria (now Calabria, Southern Italy)
- Died: December 27, 1005; Abbey of Sant'Agata, Tusculum, Latium, Papal States
- Venerated in: Catholic Church; Eastern Orthodox Church
- Major shrine: Territorial Abbacy of Santa Maria of Grottaferrata, Metropolitan City of Rome, Lazio, Italy
- Feast: September 26
- Patronage: Grottaferrata, Rossano, Serapo's ward in Gaeta

Nilus the Younger, also called Neilos of Rossano (Italian: Nilo di Rossano, Greek: Όσιος Νείλος, ο εκ Καλαβρίας; 910 – 27 December 1005) was a Griko monk and abbot from Calabria, Italy. He was the founder of Italo-Byzantine monasticism in southern Italy. He is venerated as a saint in the Eastern Orthodox (Note: "After a carefree youth in the south of Italy, he became a monk at the monastery of St Adrian in Calabria, where he later became abbot. In 981 the invading Saracens drove the monks to Vellelucio, where they lived on land given to them by the monastery of Montecassino. Shortly before his repose, Nilus designated that as the place where his monastery was to be definitively established. This monastery, of Grottaferrata, was for long faithful to Orthodoxy.") and Catholic churches, and his feast day is celebrated on September 26 in both the Byzantine calendar and the Roman Martyrology.

== Biography ==
Born to a Calabrian Greek family of Byzantine rite ("Greek rite") of Rossano, in the Byzantine theme of Calabria, for a time he was married and had a daughter. Sickness brought about his conversion, however, and from that time he became a monk and a propagator of the rule of Saint Basil in Italy.

At the time Calabria was under the Byzantine rule and was Koine Greek in language, culture, and spiritual and liturgical tradition.

He was known for his ascetic life, his virtues, and theological learning. For a time he lived as a hermit, but his reputation drew followers to Rossano, whom he began to instruct. However, after a while, he realized that he was viewed as a local authority, and hearing that there was talk of making him bishop, Nilus fled to Capua, where he stayed for fifteen years. Later he spent certain periods of his life at various monasteries which he either founded or restored. Although Nilus instructed his monks according to the Rule of St. Basil, he maintained cordial relations with the Benedictines at Monte Cassino, where he spent some time, as well as at the Alexius monastery in Rome. According to the Vita S. Adalberti by Bruno of Querfurt, Nilus was among the Greek monks present, together with the abbot Gregory, identified by Franzese with Gregory of Cerchiara, at a meeting of Latin and Greek monks held in the monastery of Saints Boniface and Alexius on the Aventine in 995–996. The Rule of St. Basil was one of the resources Benedict had recourse to when drafting his own rule.

According to his disciple and biographer, Bartholomew of Grottaferrata, in 998 Nilus hastened to Rome to intercede on behalf of a fellow native of Rossano, John Philogathos, who had, against the advice of Nilus, cooperated in an ill-advised scheme of the Roman senator Crescentius to depose the Emperor Otto III's kinsman, Pope Gregory V. Later when Philogathos was tortured and mutilated, Nilus reproached Gregory and the Emperor for this crime, prophesying that "the curse of heaven sooner or later would affect their cruel hearts".

Nilus's main legacy is the foundation in 1004 of the famous Greek Catholic monastery in Grottaferrata, (Note: Territorial Abbey of Holy Mary of Gracem of Grottaferrata (Italian: Abbazia Territoriale di Santa Maria di Grottaferrata).) near Frascati, on what was believed to be the site where Cicero had owned a villa and written his Quaestiones tusculanae.

The site was granted to Nilus by Gregory, count of Tusculum; he is counted the first abbot. He spent the end of his life partly in the Sant'Agata monastery in Tusculum and lived for fifteen years in a monastery in Valleluce's frazione in Sant'Elia Fiumerapido.

When Nilus was once asked by a Latin Rite monk about the criticisms of the Cluniac Reforms and the Roman Rite emanating from adherents of the Photian schism in Constantinople, Nilus replied, "However we differ, both do all things for the glory of God. Don't allow yourselves to be disturbed by these criticisms."

He died in the Sant'Agata monastery in 1005.

Saint Nilus is revered as the patron saint of scribes and calligraphers. The abbey continues in the Byzantine Rite.

== Sources ==
- Santa Maria di Grottaferrata
