= Rossano =

- Frazione
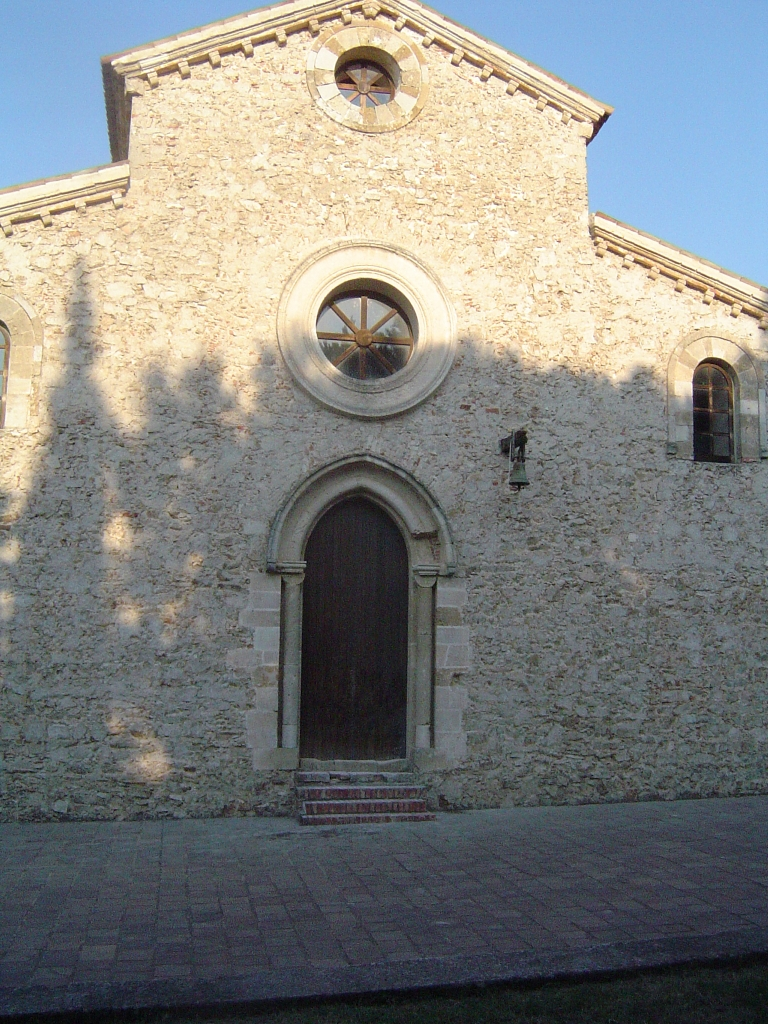
- Church of Santa Maria del Patire.

- Location of Rossano in Italy
- Coordinates: 39°34′N 16°38′E
- Country: Italy
- Region: Calabria
- Province: Cosenza (CS)
- Comune: Corigliano-Rossano

Area
  - Total: 149 km^{2} (58 sq mi)
- Elevation: 270 m (890 ft)

Population (31 December 2013)
  - Total: 36,876
  - Density: 247/km^{2} (641/sq mi)
- Demonym: Rossanesi
- Time zone: UTC+1 (CET)
  - Summer (DST): UTC+2 (CEST)
- Postal code: 87067, 87068
- Dialing code: 0983
- Patron saint: Nilus the Younger
- Saint day: September 26

Rossano is a town and frazione of Corigliano-Rossano in the province of Cosenza, Calabria, southern Italy. The city is situated on an eminence c. three kilometres (1.9 mi) from the Gulf of Taranto. The town is known for its marble and alabaster quarries.

The town is the seat of a Catholic archbishop and has a notable cathedral and castle. Two popes have been born in the town, along with Nilus the Younger.

== History ==
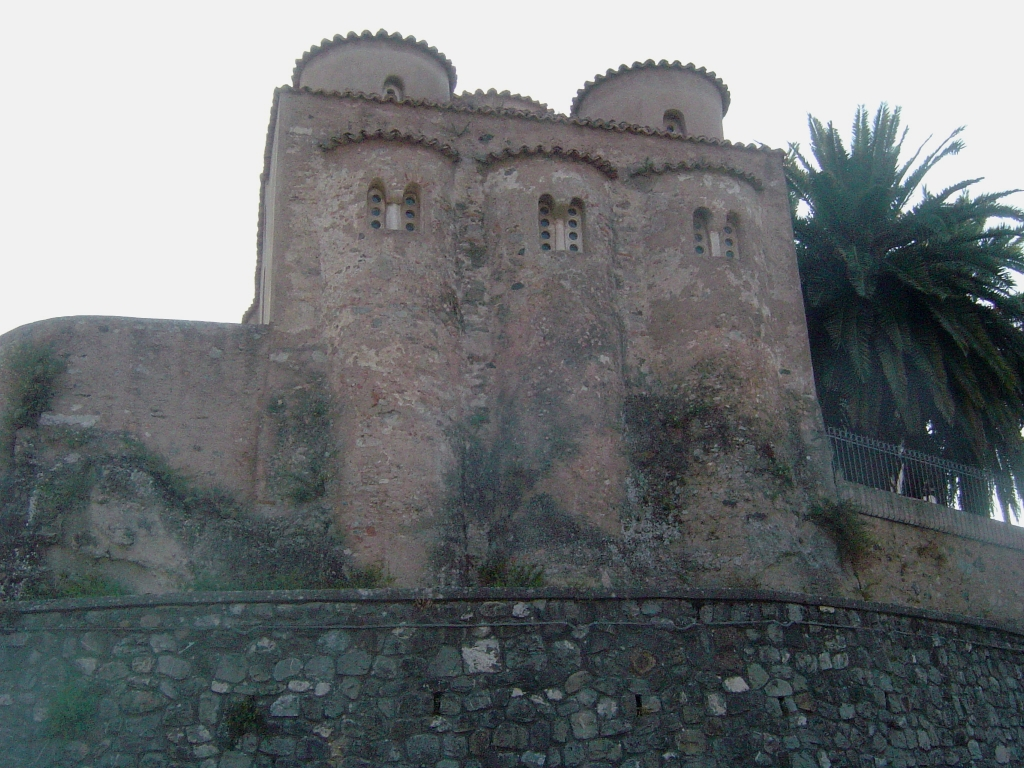
The Oratory of St. Mark.

The town was known as Roscianum under the Roman Empire. In the second century AD, the emperor Hadrian built or rebuilt a port here, which could accommodate up to 300 ships. It was mentioned in the Antonine itineraries as one of the important fortresses of Calabria. The Goths under Alaric I and, in the following century, Totila, were unable to take it.

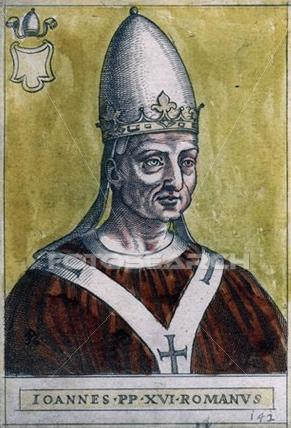
Antipope John XVI (ca. 945 – 1001) a native of Rossano.

It was known as Rhusianum under the Byzantine Empire. The Rossanesi showed great attachment to the Byzantines, who placed a strategos over the town. The Rossano Gospels, a sixth-century illuminated manuscript of great historical and artistic value, is a tangible relic of that period.

The Saracens failed to conquer Rossano, while in 982 Otto II captured it temporarily from the Byzantines. Its Greek character was preserved long after its conquest by the Normans, as noted by its long retention of the Greek Rite over the Latin Rite. The city in fact maintained notable privileges under the subsequent Hohenstaufen and Angevine dominations, but subsequently decayed after the feudalization in 1417.

Passing to the Sforza, and thus to Sigismund I the Old, it was united in 1558 to the crown of Naples by Philip II of Spain in virtue of a doubtful will by Bona Sforza, queen of Poland in favour of Giovanni Lorenzo Pappacoda. Under Isabella of Naples and Bona, the town had been a literary culture centre; but it declined under the Spaniards.

In 1612, the crown sold the lordship to the Aldobrandini, and in 1637, it passed to the Borghese who retained it until 1806. The city was part of the Neapolitan Republic of 1799, but its conditions did not improve after the Unification of Italy, and much of the population emigrated.

Rossano was the birthplace of Pope John VII and Antipope John XVI. Rossano was also the birthplace of Bartholomew the Younger and Nilus the Younger, who founded the Abbey of Grottaferrata, and whose "Life" is a valuable source of information about southern Italy in the tenth century.

Rossano is considered <<one of the most Byzantine cities in Europe>>.

Flag

Coat of Arms

== Main sights ==
- The Rossano Cathedral (Italian: Duomo di Rossano, Cattedrale di Maria Santissima Achiropita), built in 11th century, with massive interventions in the 18th–19th centuries, is the main historical building of Rossano. It has a nave with two aisles, and three apses. The bell tower and the baptismal font are from the 14th century, while the remaining decorations are from the 17th and 18th centuries. The church is famous for the ancient image of the Madonna acheropita ("Madonna not made by hands"), now located in the Diocesan Museum, probably dating between 580 and the first half of the eighth century. In 1879, the famous Codex Rossanensis was discovered in the sacristy. It is a Greek parchment manuscript of Matthew and Mark, written in silver on purple-stained parchment, and is one of the oldest pictorial Gospels known. Scholars date the codex from the end of the fifth to the eighth or ninth century; it is probably of Alexandrian origin.

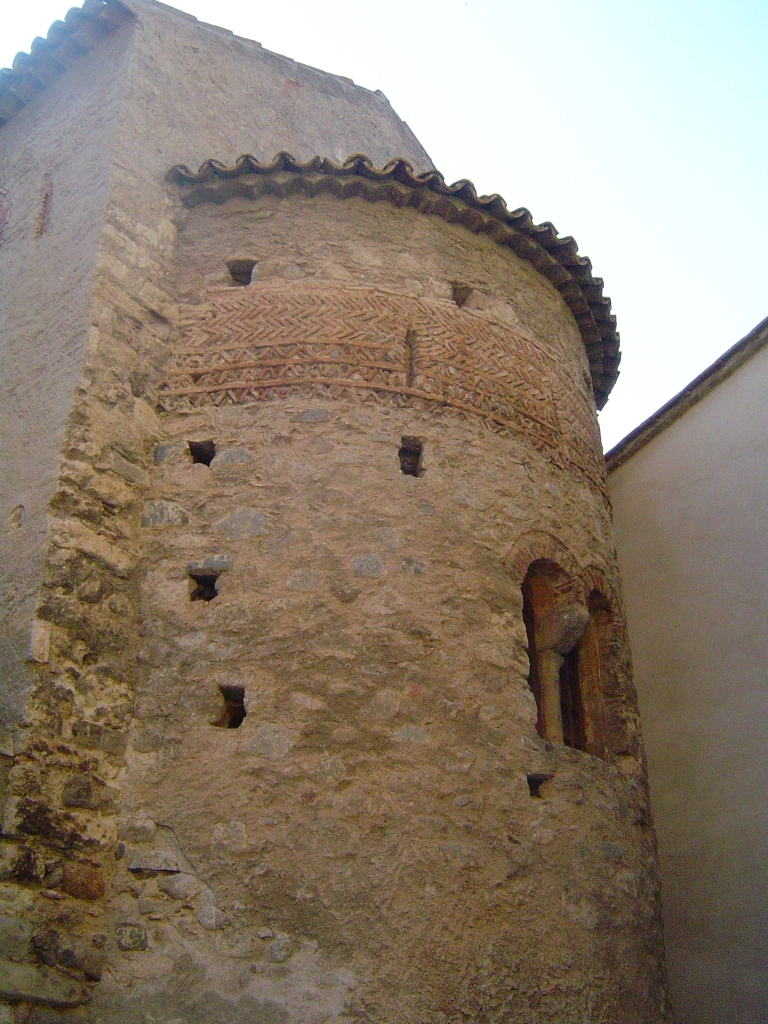
A view of Panaghia.

- Chiesa della Panaghia, an example of Byzantine architecture, with traces of frescoes portraying John Chrysostomos.
- Chiesa di San Nilo.
- The Oratory of Saint Mark (10th century, originally dedicated to St. Anastasia) is the most ancient monument of the city and one of the best preserved Byzantine churches in Italy.
- The church of Santa Chiara (1546–1554) was built by Bona Sforza.
- The church of San Francesco d'Assisi has a notable Renaissance portal and a cloister.
- The late-Gothic church of San Bernardino (1428–62) was the first Roman Catholic church in Rossano. It houses the sepulchre of Oliverio di Somma (1536) and a seventeenth-century wooden crucifix.
- Rossano is also the home of the internationally renowned annual Marco Fiume Blues Passion, a free three-day open air blues/jazz festival named after a native son who was becoming a giant in the American blues/jazz guitar world before his early demise. The festival occurs in July and is linked to the Cognac Blues Festival in France.

Outside the city are:

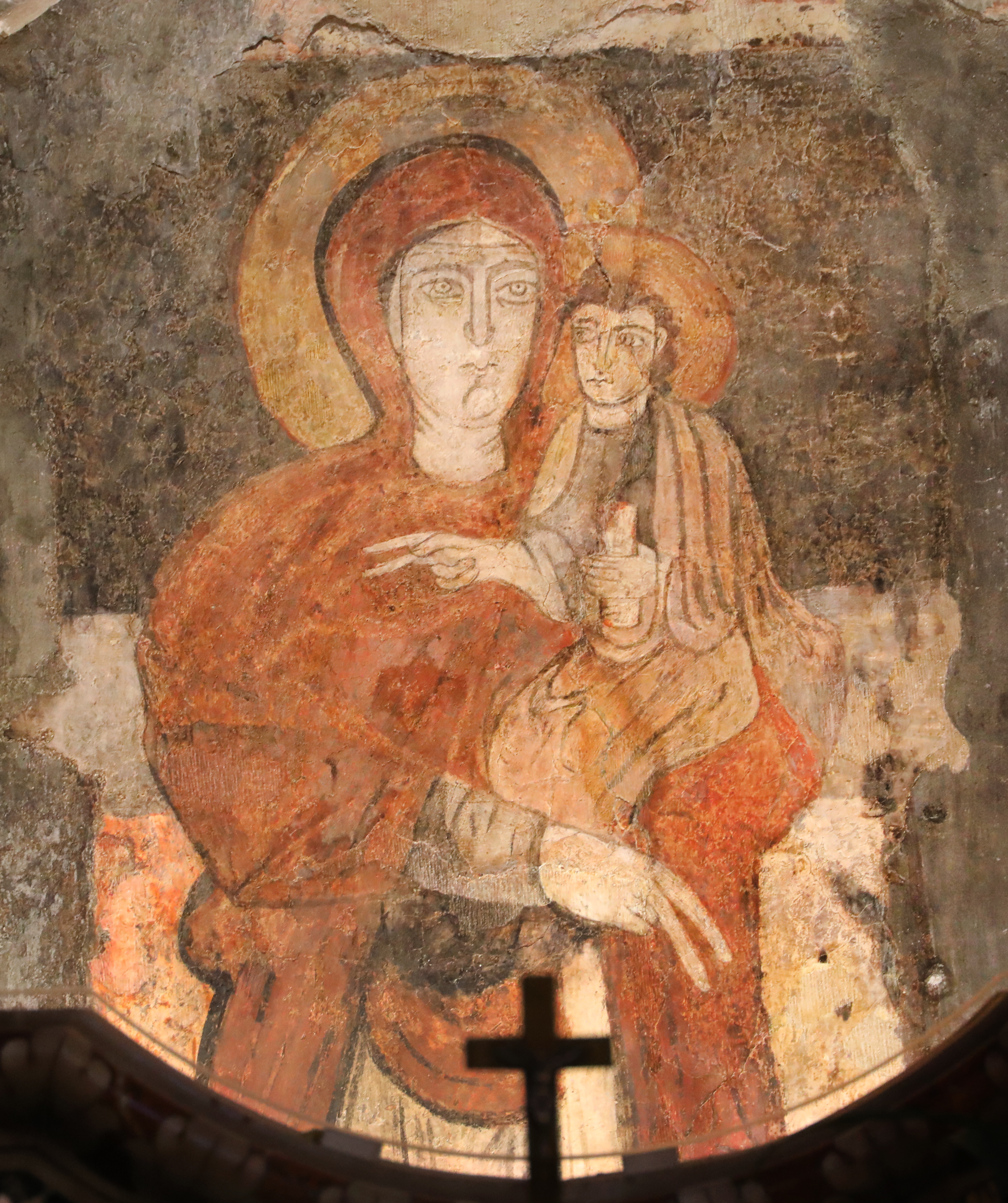
The image of Maria Achiropita in the cathedral.

- The Torre Stellata ("Star Tower") is a 16th-century fortification built over an ancient fortress.
- The Abbazia del Patire (11th–12th century), an abbey located in a wood outside the city, with some Arab-style mosaics, a Norman apse and ancient portals.
- Rossano also has a unique peculiarity: mountains and sea just a short distance away: from the beach of San. Angelo you can go trekking in the municipal mountains, with free access, of the Albanian cugnale, of the Pathirion up to S. Onofrio.
- Rossano is thriving with municipal chestnut groves: anyone can go to pick chestnuts. Furthermore, there are hectares of pine nut forests with free access and harvesting.
- In Rossano there are detached sections of national universities: UniCusano, UniPegaso and UniCampus etc.; with the possibility of choosing different degree courses: law, psychology, etc.

== Transportation ==
Rossano can be reached from the airports of Crotone, Lamezia Terme or Reggio Calabria through SS. 106 Ionica Route. Rossano has a railway station on the secondary branch starting from Sibari, on the line to Crotone.

Rossano is easily reachable via many buses (in about 6 hours of travel) from Rome Tiburtina every day and several times a day.

Rossano is also the seaport of the adjacent Corigliano.

== People ==
- Nilus the Younger (910 - 27 December 1005 AD), Saint
- Bartholomew the Younger (981-1055 AD), Saint
- Pope John VII (c. 650 - 18 October 707 AD), Pope
- Antipope John XVI (c. 945 - c. 1001), Antipope
- Carlo Blasco (1635-1706), writer and historian
- Isabela de Rosis (1842 - 1911) religious sister and congregation founder
- Alfredo Gradilone(1880-1972) historian
- Scipione Caccuri(1889-1981) occupational medicine scientist
- Giuseppe Ferrari (1912-1999), jurist, judge emeritus of the Constitutional Court
- Marco De Simone (1914-1994), partisan and senator of the Republic
- Giovanni Sapia (1922-2018), writer
- Giuseppe Carbone (1923-2013), president of the Court of Auditors
- Domenico Berlingieri (1928-1996), scientist in gynecology and obstetrics
- Angelo Raffaele Bianco (1934), oncologist
- Giuseppe Tucci (1940-2018), jurist
- Raffaele Casciaro (1943-2020), scientist in construction engineering
- Francesco Amarelli (1944), historian of Roman law
- Francesco Garritano (1952), theoretical philosopher
- Giuseppe Novelli (1959), geneticist
- Giovanni Bianco (1964), jurist and theoretician of the State
- Domenico Tedesco (1985), football manager
