= Raffaele Calabria =

Italian Catholic bishop

His Excellency, The Most Reverend Raffaele Calabria
- Metropolitan Archbishop of Benevento
- Church: Roman Catholic
- Archdiocese: Benevento
- In office: 1 January 1962–24 May 1982
- Previous post: Metropolitan Archbishop of Otranto (1952–1960)

Orders
- Ordination: 16 March 1929
- Consecration: 29 June 1950

Personal details
- Born: 11 December 1906 Lucera, Apulia, Italy
- Died: 24 May 1982 (aged 75) Benevento, Campania, Italy
- Education: Pontifical Gregorian University

Raffaele Calabria (11 December 1906 – 24 May 1982) was an Italian Catholic bishop. During his career, he served as Archbishop of Otranto and Archbishop of Benevento.

== Biography ==
Raffaele Calabria was born on 11 December 1906 in the town of Lucera in Apulia, Italy. He studied at the Pontifical Gregorian University and received his degree in philosophy and theology, subjects he later taught in Salerno.

He was ordained a priest on 16 March 1929 and then consecrated a bishop on 29 June 1950, when he was appointed the Titular Archbishop of Soterioupolis on 6 May 1950, which he held until 10 July 1952. Calabria was then appointed the Metropolitan Archbishop of Otranto on 10 July 1952, a position he held until 12 July 1960. Upon resigning as Archbishop of Otranto, he was made the Titular Archbishop of Heliopolis in Phoenicia on 12 July 1960, which he held until 1 January 1962. Finally, on the same date, Calabria was appointed Metropolitan Archbishop of Benevento. He held this title until 24 May 1982, when he resigned from pastoral governance.

Calabria was a participant in the Second Vatican Council, where he sided with more conservative positions. At the end of the council, he became engaged in a spirited debate with future Cardinal Yves Congar about modernism.

Calabria was also responsible for renovating the Benevento Cathedral, including the large organ and the Stations of the Cross.

On 24 May 1982, Raffaele Calabria died in Benevento at the age of 75.

Catholic Church titles
Preceded by Anselmo Filippo Pecci	— TITULAR — Archbishop of Soterioupolis; 6 May 1950–10 July 1952	Succeeded by Ettore Cunial
Preceded by Cornelio Sebastiano Cuccarollo	Metropolitan Archbishop of Otranto; 10 July 1952–12 July 1960	Succeeded by Gaetano Pollio
Preceded by Daniel Rivero Rivero	— TITULAR — Archbishop of Heliopolis in Phoenicia; 12 July 1960–1 January 1962	Succeeded by Ottavio De Liva
Preceded by Agostino Mancinelli	Metropolitan Archbishop of Benevento; 1 January 1962–24 May 1982	Succeeded by Carlo Minchiatti
