= Domenico Graziani =

Italian Roman Catholic prelate (1944–2026)

The Most Reverend Domenico Graziani
- Archbishop of Crotone-Santa Severina
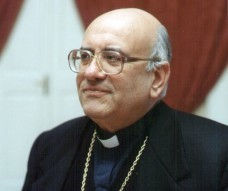
- Archdiocese: Crotone-Santa Severina
- Appointed: 21 November 2006
- Term ended: 7 November 2019
- Predecessor: Andrea Mugione
- Successor: Angelo Raffaele Panzetta
- Previous post: Bishop of Cassano all'Jonio (1999–2006)

Orders
- Ordination: 5 January 1968 by Michele Federici
- Consecration: 10 October 1999 by Lucas Moreira Neves, Andrea Mugione, Giuseppe Agostino

Personal details
- Born: 23 May 1944 Calopezzati, Italy
- Died: 7 January 2026 (aged 81) Calopezzati, Italy
- Motto: Verbo gratiae commendatus
- Coat of arms

Styles of Domenico Graziani
- Reference style: His Excellency; The Most Reverend
- Spoken style: Your Excellency
- Religious style: Archbishop

Domenico Graziani (23 May 1944 – 7 January 2026) was an Italian Roman Catholic prelate.

Graziani was born in Calopezzati on 23 May 1944. After studying at the minor seminary of Santa Severina and, subsequently, at the Pontifical Regional Seminary of St. Pius X in Catanzaro, in 1967 he enrolled at the Pontifical Gregorian University, obtaining a licentiate in dogmatic theology and, later, a licentiate in sacred scripture at the Pontifical Biblical Institute. On 5 January 1968, he was ordained a priest at the cathedral in Santa Severina by Archbishop Michele Federici.

On 21 August 1999, Pope John Paul II appointed him Bishop of Cassano all'Jonio; he succeeded Andrea Mugione. On 10 October, he received episcopal ordination at Crotone Cathedral from Cardinal Lucas Moreira Neves, prefect of the Congregation for Bishops, co-consecrators Andrea Mugione, his predecessor, and Giuseppe Agostino, archbishop of Cosenza-Bisignano. On 30 October, he took possession of the diocese. On 21 November 2006, Pope Benedict XVI appointed him archbishop of Crotone-Santa Severina. On 7 November 2019, Pope Francis accepted his resignation.

Graziani died on 7 January 2026 at the age of 81.

Catholic Church titles
Preceded by Andrea Mugione	Archbishop of Crotone-Santa Severina; 2006–2019	Succeeded by Angelo Raffaele Panzetta
Preceded by Andrea Mugione	Bishop of Cassano all'Jonio; 1999–2006	Succeeded by Vincenzo Bertolone
