= Camillo Siciliano di Rende =

Italian prelate

His Eminence Camillo Siciliano di Rende
- Archbishop of Benevento
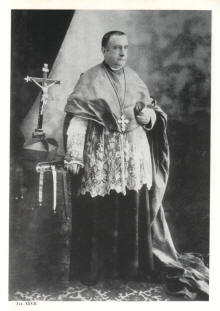
- Church: Roman Catholic Church
- Archdiocese: Benevento
- See: Benevento
- Appointed: 12 May 1879
- Installed: 22 June 1879
- Term ended: 16 May 1897
- Predecessor: Domenico Carafa della Spina di Traetto
- Successor: Donato Maria Dell'Olio
- Other post: Cardinal-Priest of San Sisto (1887-97)
- Previous posts: Bishop of Tricarico (1877-79); Apostolic Nuncio to France (1882-87); Apostolic Administrator of Lucera (1888-91)

Orders
- Ordination: 3 June 1871 by Sisto Riario Sforza
- Consecration: 1 January 1878 by Flavio Chigi
- Created cardinal: 14 March 1887 by Pope Leo XIII
- Rank: Cardinal-Priest

Personal details
- Born: Camillo Siciliano di Rende; 9 June 1847 Naples, Kingdom of the Two Sicilies
- Died: 16 May 1897 (aged 49) Monte Cassino, Kingdom of Italy
- Buried: Benevento Cathedral
- Parents: Giovanni Maria Siciliano; Angelica Caracciolo di Torella
- Education: Pontifical Gregorian University; Collegio Capranica

Camillo Siciliano di Rende, sometimes Siciliano di Rende (9 June 1847 – 16 May 1897) was an Italian prelate of the Catholic Church who was Archbishop of Benevento from 1879 until his death in 1897. He was also Bishop of Tricarico from 1877 to 1879 and Apostolic Nuncio to France from 1882 to 1887. He was made a cardinal in 1887.

== Biography ==
Camillo Siciliano di Rende was born in Naples on 9 June 1847 into a noble family, the son of the Marquis Giovanni di Rende. The family name was "Siciliano" and its title "di Rende". (Note: Nineteenth-century sources refer to the family by their title of nobility. An 1897 Italian essay says his father was il Marchese Giovanni di Rende and his mother la Marchesa di Rende; it refers to il cardinale di Rende. And an 1890 Italian guide to the Catholic hierarchy refers to him as l'Emo di Rende, that is, His Eminence di Rende.) After beginning his studies in Piedigrotta, he joined his parents as they accompanied the Bourbons of Naples into exile in 1860. He studied humanities at the minor seminary of La Chapelle-Saint-Mesmin near Orléans. From 1867 to 1868 he earned a licentiate in philosophy at the Pontifical Gregorian University and then studied theology at Collegio Capranica.

He was ordained a priest of the Archdiocese of Naples on 3 June 1871. He was pastor of a parish in London for several months and then returned to Naples where he devoted himself to preaching to French and English pilgrims and converting Protestants.

Pope Pius IX appointed him bishop of Tricarico on 28 December 1877. He received his episcopal consecration on 1 January 1878 from Cardinal Flavio Chigi. Pope Leo XIII made him a member of the papal nobility as Assistant to the Pontifical Throne on 20 August 1878. He was appointed Archbishop of Benevento on 12 May 1879.

He was named Apostolic Nuncio to France on 26 October 1882, but Pope Leo granted his request to retain the see of Benevento, to which he eventually returned. When made a cardinal, he remained in Paris as pro-nuncio until the appointment of his successor.

Pope Leo raised him to the rank of cardinal priest on 14 March 1887. He received his red biretta and was assigned the titular church of San Sisto on 26 May 1887. He was not quite forty years old and the youngest member of the College of Cardinals.

He died suddenly of pneumonia on 16 May 1897 at the abbey of Montecassino, where he had stopped en route to Rome where he planned to attend the canonization ceremony for Anthony Zaccaria.
