= Landulf I =

Landulf I may refer to:

- Landulf I of Capua (died 843)
- Landulf I of Benevento (died 943)
- Landulf I (archbishop of Benevento) (died 982)
