= Accrocca =

Accrocca is an Italian surname. Notable people with the surname include:

- Elio Filippo Accrocca (1923–1996), Italian poet, author, and translator
- Felice Accrocca (born 1959), Italian Roman Catholic ordinary and archbishop
