= Andrea Mugione =

Italian Catholic bishop (1940–2020)

His Excellency, The Most Reverend Andrea Mugione
- Archbishop Emeritus of Benevento
- Church: Catholic Church
- Archdiocese: Benevento
- In office: 3 May 2006–18 February 2016
- Predecessor: Serafino Sprovieri
- Successor: Felice Accrocca
- Previous posts: Archbishop of Crotone-Santa Severina (1998–2006); Bishop of Cassano all'Jonio (1988–1998)

Personal details
- Born: 9 November 1940 Caivano, Campania, Italy
- Died: 26 February 2020 (aged 79) Naples, Italy
- Motto: Latin: Communio et missio
- Coat of arms: Andrea Mugione's coat of arms

Ordination history of Andrea Mugione
History
Priestly ordination
- Ordained by: Antonio Cece
Episcopal consecration
- Principal consecrator: Bernadin Gantin
- Co-consecrators: João Gazza, Giuseppe Agostino

Andrea Mugione (9 November 1940 – 26 February 2020) was an Italian Catholic bishop. He has previously served as Bishop of Cassano all'Jonio from 1988 to 1998, Archbishop of Crotone-Santa Severina from 1998 to 2006, and Metropolitan Archbishop of Benevento from 2006 to 2016.

== Biography ==
Andrea Mugione was born on 9 November 1940 in the Italian comune of Caivano, in the region of Campania. He studied at the diocesan seminary in Aversa and the Pontifical Regional Seminary of Salerno, where he studied philosophy and theology.

=== Priest ===
Mugione was ordained a priest in the Aversa Cathedral on 28 June 1964 by Bishop Antonio Cece. He then received a licentiate and doctorate in dogmatic theology at the San Luigi Papal Theological Seminary of Southern Italy. Upon returning to the Pontifical Regional Seminary of Salerno, he became the vice rector and professor of art history for several years.

From 1968 to 1978, he lived as a missionary in Venezuela, where he was an assistant parish priest in the parish of Saint Lucia in Yaritagua, Yaracuy. He also served as a lecturer in philosophy, psychology, art history, religion, English, and Spanish at the liceo classico in the parish.

Mugione then returned to Italy and held numerous different positions, including spiritual director of the diocesan seminary of Aversa from 1978 to 1982, pastor of San Michele Orta di Atella from 1980 to 1983, pastor of San Michele Arcangelo in Aversa from 1983 to 1986, rector of the diocesan seminary of Aversa from 1986 to 1988, and professor of moral theology and dogmatics at the St. Paul Diocesan Institute of Religious Sciences in Aversa. Due to his missionary experience, he became the director of the diocesan mission office of Aversa.

=== Bishop ===
On 17 March 1988, Mugione was appointed Bishop of Cassano all'Jonio by Pope John Paul II. He received his episcopal consecration on 28 April of that year in the Aversa Cathedral by Cardinal Bernardin Gantin, the Prefect of the Congregation for Bishops at the time. Ten years later, on 21 November 1998, he was raised to the rank of archbishop and appointed the Archbishop of Crotone-Santa Severina.

On 3 May 2006, Pope Benedict XVI appointed Mugione the Metropolitan Archbishop of Benevento, where he was enthroned on 24 June in a ceremony at the Basilica of Our Lady of Grace in Benevento, (due to the archdiocese's cathedral being under restoration). On the Feast of Saints Peter and Paul, on 29 June 2006, he received his pallium from Pope Benedict in St. Peter's Basilica.

On 18 February 2016, upon reaching the canonical age limit, Mugione submitted his resignation from pastoral governance of the Archdiocese of Benevento to the Holy See. Taking up emeritus status, he was succeeded by Felice Accrocca.

Catholic Church titles
Preceded by Giovanni Francesco Pala	Bishop of Cassano all'Jonio; 17 March 1988–21 November 1998	Succeeded by Domenico Graziani
Preceded by Giuseppe Agostino	Archbishop of Crotone-Santa Severina; 21 November 1998–3 May 2006	Succeeded by Domenico Graziani
Preceded by Serafino Sprovieri	Metropolitan Archbishop of Benevento; 3 May 2006–18 February 2016	Succeeded by Felice Accrocca
