= Casa del Fascio (Bolzano) =

Building in Italy

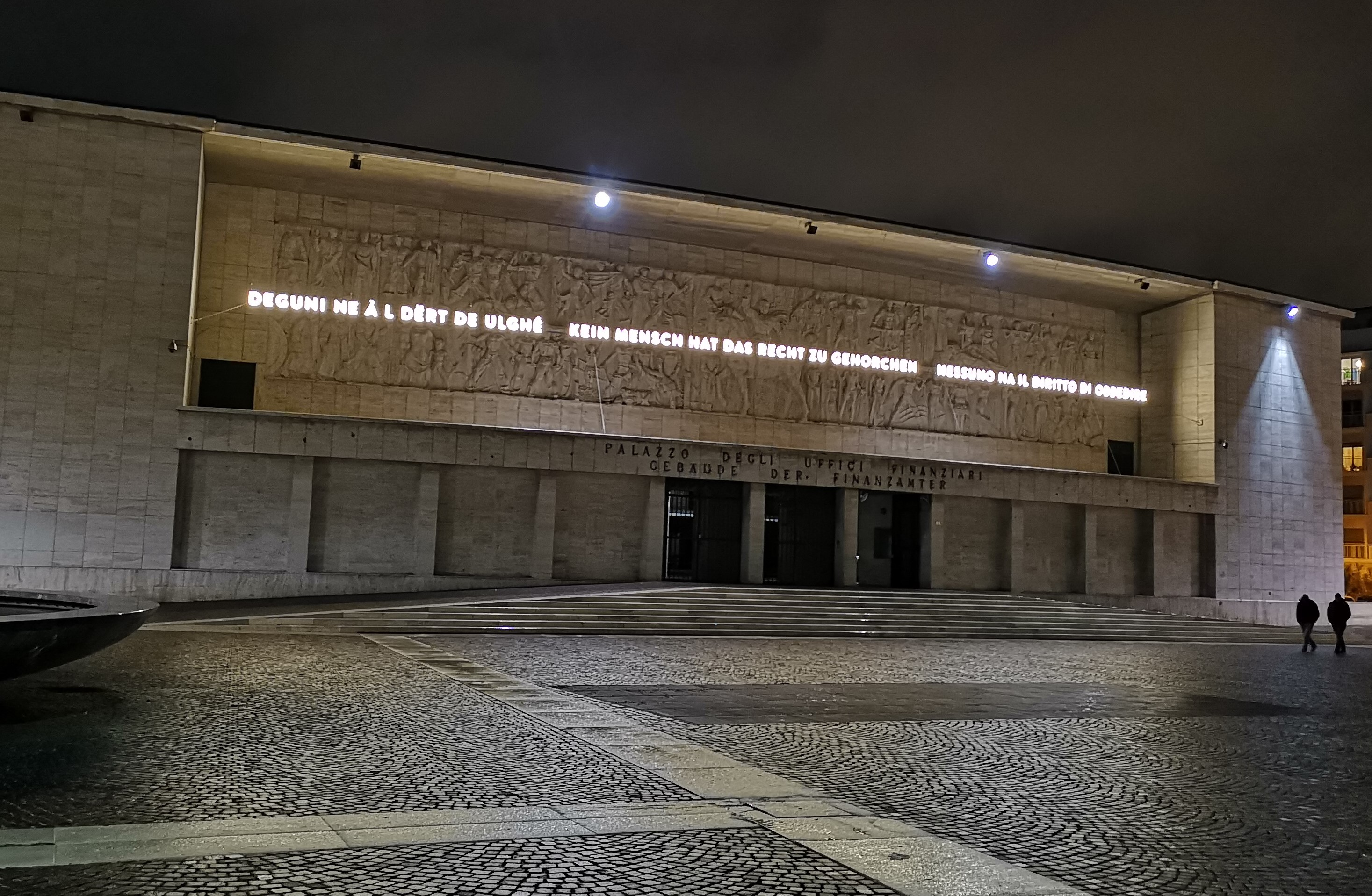
The monumental bas-relief from the fascist period bearing an illuminated quote from Hannah Arendt

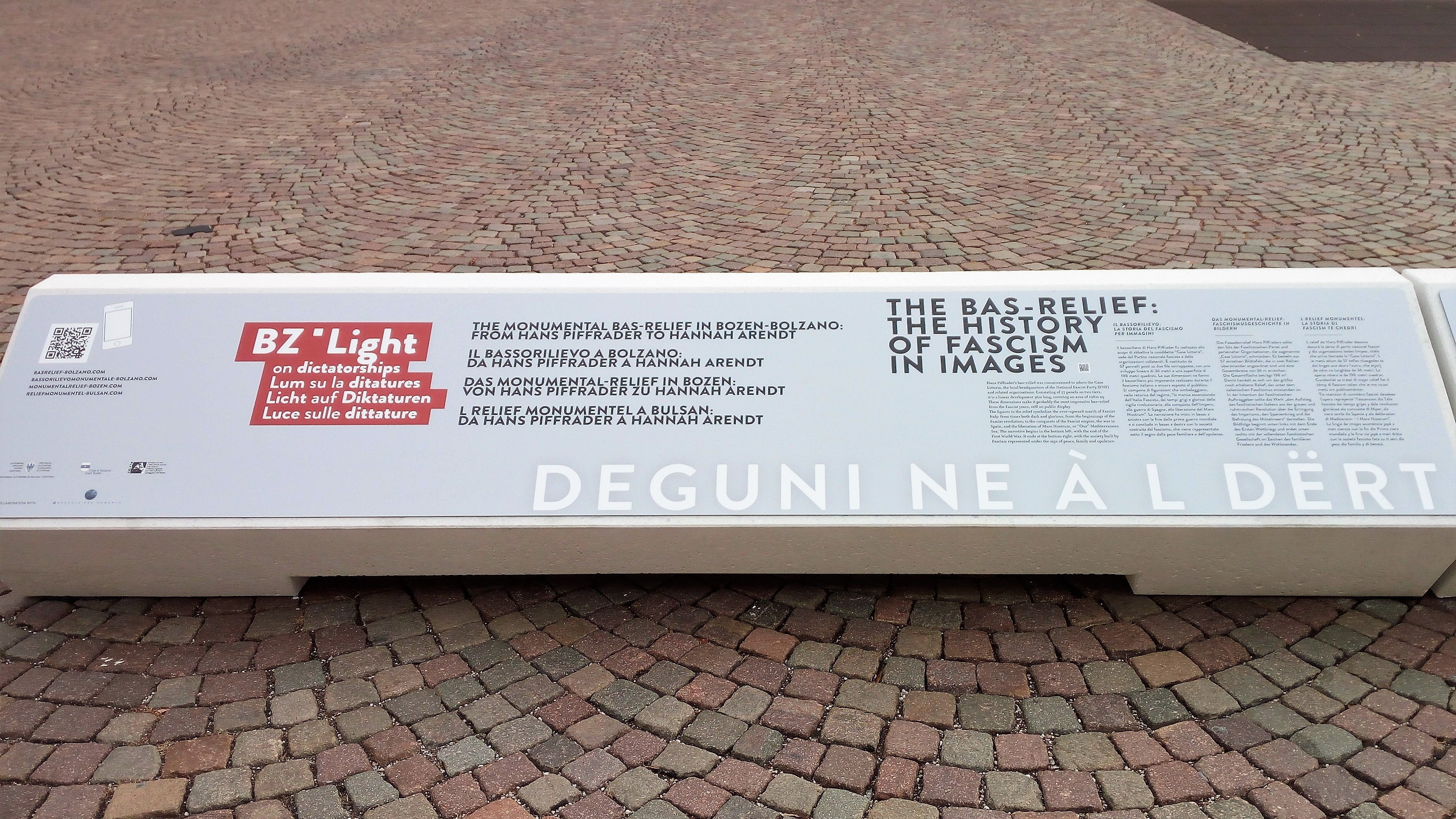
Partial view of the infopoint installed on the square itself

The former Casa del Fascio in Bolzano (also Casa Littoria) was built between 1939 and 1942 in a rationalist style on a project by the architects Guido Pelizzari, Francesco Rossi and Luis Plattner, as the seat of the Italian Fascist Party and its collateral organisations, in Piazza del Tribunale (German: Gerichtsplatz; formerly Piazza Arnaldo Mussolini). Since the end of World War II it has housed the State Financial Offices and other state bodies operating in South Tyrol.

The convex-shaped building relates to the opposite Courthouse, built between 1939 and 1956 to a concave design by Paolo Rossi de Paoli and Michele Busiri Vici. The former Casa del Fascio bears a monumental bas-relief designed and sculptured by Hans Piffrader, placed above a large balcony, with Benito Mussolini on horseback in the centre and in the act of the Roman salute and telling the story of the "triumph of Fascism", a work commissioned by the Fascist Party itself. It consists of 57 panels of variable width, 2.75 metres high, placed in two superimposed rows, for a linear development of 36 metres, an area of 198 square metres and a total weight of about 95 tonnes. These dimensions probably make it the most impressive bas-relief made during fascism and still exposed to the public.

Despite being state-owned and continuous protests by German-speaking South Tyroleans, the relief remained untouched for decades. In 2011, the Italian Minister of Culture Sandro Bondi finally agreed to a contextualisation or removal of several fascist era remains in the province during negotiations with members of parliament of the South Tyrolean People's Party about an upcoming vote of no-confidence. In 2017, like the Bolzano Victory Monument, the Piffrader frieze was also subjected, on the initiative of the South Tyrolean Provincial Administration and on the basis of a joint historical commission proposal, to an intervention of historicization and recontextualization, on an artistic project by Arnold Holzknecht and Michele Bernardi, with the affixing of an illuminated inscription bearing a quotation from the philosopher Hannah Arendt in three languages (Italian, German, Ladin) — "No one has the right to obey" — as opposed to the fascist dogma of Believe, obey, combat (Credere, obbedire, combattere) still present on the bas-relief.

An infopoint has been installed on the square itself, with explanatory texts in four languages, explaining the history of the building, Piffrader's work, the more general urban context, and the quotation by Hannah Arendt.

== Bibliography ==
- Frei, Mathias (2005), Hans Piffrader 1888–1950. Entwürfe zum Relief am Gebäude der Finanzämter in Bozen = Bozzetti per il rilievo del Palazzo degli Uffici finanziari di Bolzano, Bozen, Südtiroler Künstlerbund (in German).
- Strobl, Wolfgang (2015), "Mussolini im Gewande Neros. Subversives und Zensur in der Kunst einer Grenzregion des faschistischen Italien (Zu Hans Piffraders Fries für die Casa del Fascio in Bozen)." Geschichte und Region/Storia e regione, 24, nr. 2, pp. 170–84 (in German).
- Obermair, Hannes (2017), "Monuments and the City—an almost inextricable entanglement", in Matthias Fink; et al. (eds.), Multiple Identitäten in einer "glokalen Welt"—Identità multiple in un "mondo glocale"—Multiple identities in a "glocal world", Bozen-Bolzano: Eurac Research, pp. 88–99, ISBN 978-88-98857-35-7
- Obermair, Hannes (2018). "Da Hans a Hannah—il "duce" di Bolzano e la sfida di Arendt". Il Cristallo. Rassegna di varia umanità (in Italian). 60 (1): 27–32. ISBN 978-88-7223-312-2. ISSN 0011-1449.
- Kraus, Carl; Obermair, Hannes (2019). Mythen der Diktaturen. Kunst in Faschismus und Nationalsozialismus – Miti delle dittature. Arte nel fascismo e nazionalsocialismo (in German and Italian). Südtiroler Landesmuseum für Kultur- und Landesgeschichte Schloss Tirol. pp. 201–7. ISBN 978-88-95523-16-3.
- di Michele, Andrea (2020), "Storicizzare i monumenti fascisti. Il caso di Bolzano." Geschichte und Region/Storia e regione, 29, nr. 2, pp. 149–67 (in Italian); also in English transl. (2022), "Fascist Monuments on the Border. The Case of Bolzano/Bozen, South Tyrol", in Andrea Di Michele, Filippo Focardi (eds.), Rethinking Fascism. The Italian and German Dictatorships, Berlin/Boston, de Gruyter, pp. 247–74. https://doi.org/10.1515/9783110768619-013.
- Cento Bull, Anna; Clarke, David (2020), "Agonistic interventions into public commemorative art: An innovative form of counter-memorial practice?" Constellations. An International Journal of Critical and Democratic Theory, Vol. 27, Wiley 2020, pp. 1–15.
- Belmonte, Carmen (2021), "Art contemporain et préservation critique des monuments du fascisme en Italie. Un «iconoclash» à Bolzano." In Laura Iamurri, Luca Acquarelli, Francesco Zucconi (eds.), Le fascisme italien au prisme des arts contemporains. Réinterprétations, remontages, déconstructions. Rennes: PUR Editions, pp. 203–17.
- Bevan, Robert (2022). Monumental Lies. Culture Wars and the Truth about the Past. London-New York: Verso. pp. 22–27, 283–84. ISBN 978-1-83976-187-4.
- Obermair, Hannes (2024), "Das Beispiel Bozen oder: Lassen sich bauliche Relikte des Faschismus in demokratische Ressourcen transformieren?", in Ingrid Böhler, Karin Harrasser; et al. (eds.), Ver/störende Orte. Zum Umgang mit NS-kontaminierten Gebäuden, Vienna: Mandelbaum Verlag, pp. 250–57, ISBN 978-3-99136-019-3

== See also ==
- Casa del Fascio (Como)
- Casa del Fascio (Varese)
