= Doctor of both laws =

Scholar with a doctorate in both civil and church law

A doctor of both laws (from the Latin doctor juris utriusque, doctor utriusque juris, or juris utriusque doctor, "doctor of both laws"; abbreviations include: JUD, IUD, DUJ, JUDr., DUI, DJU, Dr.iur.utr., Dr.jur.utr., DIU, UJD and UID) is a scholar who has acquired a doctorate in both civil and church law. The degree was common among Roman Catholic and German scholars of the Middle Ages and early modern times.

Today, the degree is awarded by the Pontifical Lateran University after a period of six years of study, the University of Würzburg, the University of Fribourg, and the University of Cologne. The Catholic University of America does not award the doctor utriusque juris as a single degree, but instead offers a dual doctorate in canon and civil law.

Between approximately the twelfth through the eighteenth centuries, European students of law mastered the Ius commune, a pan-European legal system that held sway during that span. It was composed of canon (church) law and Roman and feudal (civil) law, resulting in the degree of "Doctor of both laws". or of "Licentiatus of both laws".

== Doctors of Civil and Canon Law ==
- Antonio Agliardi, Cardinal, Camerlengo of the Sacred College of Cardinals
- Antonio Arregui Yarza, Metropolitan Archbishop of the Roman Catholic Archdiocese of Guayaquil, Ecuador
- Thomas Bach
- Bernardo Bembo
- Pope Benedict XIV
- Anthony Bevilacqua, Cardinal, Archbishop Emeritus of Philadelphia (USA)
- Jean de Dieu-Raymond de Cucé de Boisgelin
- St. Charles Borromeo
- Edoardo Borromeo
- Sebastian Brant
- Giacomo Luigi Brignole
- Giovanni Battista Bussi (1755–1844)
- Antonio Maria Cagiano de Azevedo
- Étienne Hubert de Cambacérès
- Giovanni Battista Caprara
- Filippo Giudice Caracciolo
- Domenico Carafa della Spina di Traetto
- Francesco Carafa di Trajetto
- Pier Luigi Carafa, Cardinal, Camerlengo of the Sacred College of Cardinals, Dean of the College of Cardinals
- Luigi Dadaglio, Cardinal, Major Penitentiary of the Apostolic Penitentiary
- Antonio Despuig y Dameto
- Michele di Pietro
- Domenico Ferrata, Cardinal, Secretary of State
- Giuseppe Milesi Pironi Ferretti
- Michael J. Fitzgerald, Auxiliary Bishop of the Archdiocese of Philadelphia
- Enrico Gasparri, Cardinal, Prefect of the Supreme Tribunal of the Apostolic Signatura
- Pietro Gasparri, Cardinal, Secretary of State, codifier of 1917 Code of Canon Law
- Pietro Giannelli
- Giacomo Giustiniani
- Józef Glemp, Cardinal, late Archbishop emeritus of Warsaw (Poland)
- Archbishop Filippo Iannone, appointed Vicegerent of the Diocese of Rome 31 January 2012
- Stephan Kuttner, Professor, Catholic University of America, Yale University, and University of California at Berkeley, founder of the Stephan Kuttner Institute of Medieval Canon Law
- Carlo Laurenzi
- Pope Leo XIII
- Alphonsus Maria de Liguori, Bishop of Sant'Agata de' Goti
- Listecki, Jerome Edward, Archbishop of Milwaukee (USA)
- Vincenzo Macchi
- Lorenzo Girolamo Mattei
- Teodolfo Mertel, last lay cardinal in the Catholic Church
- Denzil Meuli, priest of the diocese of Auckland
- Alfonso Ortiz, editor of the Mozarabic Missal (1500) and Breviary (1502)
- J. K. Paasikivi, President of Finland
- Giovanni Panico, cardinal and nuncio
- Salvatore Pappalardo, Cardinal, Archbishop of Palermo (Italy)
- Thomas J. Paprocki, Bishop of Roman Catholic Diocese of Springfield in Illinois (USA)
- Peters, Edward N., Catholic University of America, 1991
- Luigi Poggi, Cardinal, Archivist and Librarian Emeritus of the Holy Roman Church
- Mario Francesco Pompedda, Cardinal, Prefect of the Supreme Tribunal of the Apostolic Signatura
- Pietro Respighi, Cardinal, Archpriest of the Basilica of St. John Lateran
- Gabriele della Genga Sermattei
- K. J. Ståhlberg, President of Finland
- Alessandro Verde, Cardinal, Archpriest of the Basilica di Santa Maria Maggiore (Italy)
- Pietro Vidoni
- Carlo Maria Viganò, Archbishop at the centre of the Vatileaks scandal
- Jan Wężyk
- Jean-Baptiste van Dievoet (1775-1862) JUL (Juris Utriusque Licentiatus) of the Old University of Leuven.
- Antonín Theodor Colloredo-Waldsee, Cardinal, Archbishop of Olomouc
- Guido Marini, Bishop of Tortona

== See also ==
- Doctor of Canon Law
- Legum Doctor
