= Benedetto Bonazzi =

19th and 20th-century Italian Catholic bishop and scholar

- Archbishop of Benevento
- Church: Catholic
- Archdiocese: Benevento
- Elected: 11 June 1902
- Term ended: 23 April 1915

Orders
- Ordination: 19 December 1863

Personal details
- Born: 12 October 1840; Marigliano
- Died: 23 April 1915 (aged 74); Benevento

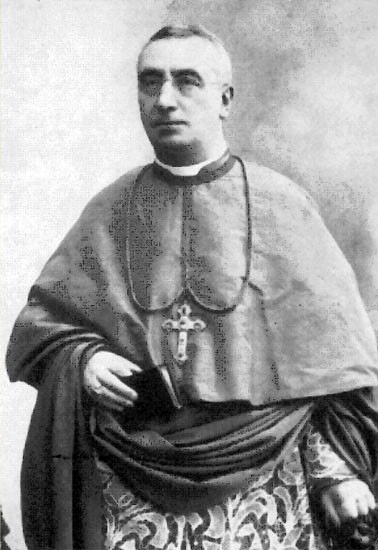
Benedetto Bonazzi

Benedetto Bonazzi (12 October 1840 in Marigliano – 23 April 1915 in Benevento) was a Catholic archbishop and Italian Hellenist.

== Biography ==
Bonazzi was the second of six children of Count Nicola, lord of San Nicandro and Adelaide Sorrentino of the lords of Pomigliano. At the age of seven he was admitted to the Benedictine abbey of La Trinità della Cava in Cava de' Tirreni and on 6 November 1849 he became part of the cloistered community there. He studied at the school of the Santissima Trinità of Cava de' Tirreni and was named as a novice of Montacassino on 15 August 1859.

Bonazzi specialised in the study of Ancient Greek and Latin. On 19 December 1863 he was ordained at Naples by Bishop Tommaso Michele Salzano. He graduated from his studies on 12 December 1865 at the University of Naples. As a philosopher, orator and writer he was member of several academies and cultural associations.

On 27 November 1872 Bonazzi was named professor of the University of Naples, but he refused the position, preferring the school of Badia cavense, which he put in charge of in 1878, as its prefect. Bonazzi's principle interest was pedagogy. He sought to reform the system of Greek teaching in schools. He was the author of numerous scholarly texts, which inspired new methods of teaching. One of his works was commended by the 7th Italian Pedagogical congress. His most important work, which received acclaim across Europe, remains the Dizionario greco-italiano, which was in print from 1880 to 1927 with twenty-five editions, by the publishers, Morano di Napoli.

Simultaneously, Bonazzi's ecclesiastical career continued. In 1892 he became Vicar general of the diocese of Badia Cavense. At the death of the abbot Michele Morcaldi, on 7 March 1894, Pope Leo XIII appointed him abbot of the Cavense monastery. Subsequently, at the death of cardinal Donato Maria Dell'Olio, archbishop of Benevento, Leo XIII consecrated him as the replacement, on 9 June 1902. On 11 June he was ordained at the Basilica of Saint Paul Outside the Walls and he took possession of the archdiocese of Benevento on 24 August.

After around thirteen years of episcopal government and a final Lenten sermon, Bonazzi fell ill and died during the vigil for his elevation to the rank of cardinal, which Pope Benedict XV had ordained for him. He was buried in the church of St Clementina at Benevento.

== Sources ==
- Simeone Leone, "Dalla fondazione del cenobio al secolo XVI," in La badia di Cava, edizioni Di Mauro – Cava de' Tirreni, 1985
- Gerardo Bianco, BONAZZI, BENEDETTO, Dizionario Biografico degli Italiani – Volume XI (1969), Istituto dell'Enciclopedia italiana Treccani
- Ferdinando Grassi – I pastori della cattedra beneventana, tip. Auxiliatrix, Benevento, 1969
- Bonazzi ‹-zzi›, Benedetto, Enciclopedia Biografica Universale, Istituto dell'Enciclopedia italiana Treccani
