= Giovanni Battista Bussi (1755–1844) =

Catholic cardinal from Italy

His Eminence Giovanni Battista Bussi
- Archbishop of Benevento
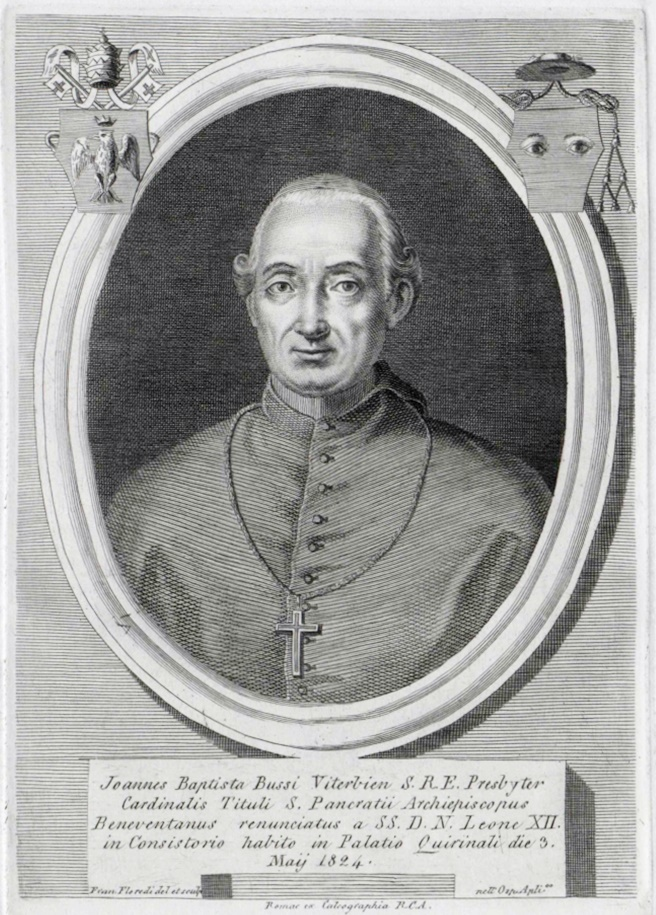
- Church: Roman Catholic Church
- Archdiocese: Benevento
- See: Benevento
- Appointed: 3 May 1824
- Term ended: 31 January 1844
- Predecessor: Domenico Spinucci
- Successor: Domenico Carafa della Spina di Traetto
- Other post: Cardinal-Priest of San Pancrazio (1824-44)

Orders
- Ordination: 21 September 1782
- Consecration: 23 May 1824 by Bartolomeo Pacca
- Created cardinal: 3 May 1824 by Pope Leo XII
- Rank: Cardinal-Priest

Personal details
- Born: Giovanni Battista Bussi; 23 January 1755 Viterbo, Papal States
- Died: 31 January 1844 (aged 89) Benevento, Kingdom of the Two Sicilies
- Buried: Benevento Cathedral
- Parents: Domenico Bussi; Olimpia Melchiorri
- Education: La Sapienza
- Coat of arms

Giovanni Battista Bussi (23 January 1755 in Viterbo – 31 January 1844 in Benevento) was an Italian cleric. He was raised to cardinal by pope Leo XII in the consistory of 3 May 1824.
