= Exultet roll =

Illuminated scroll

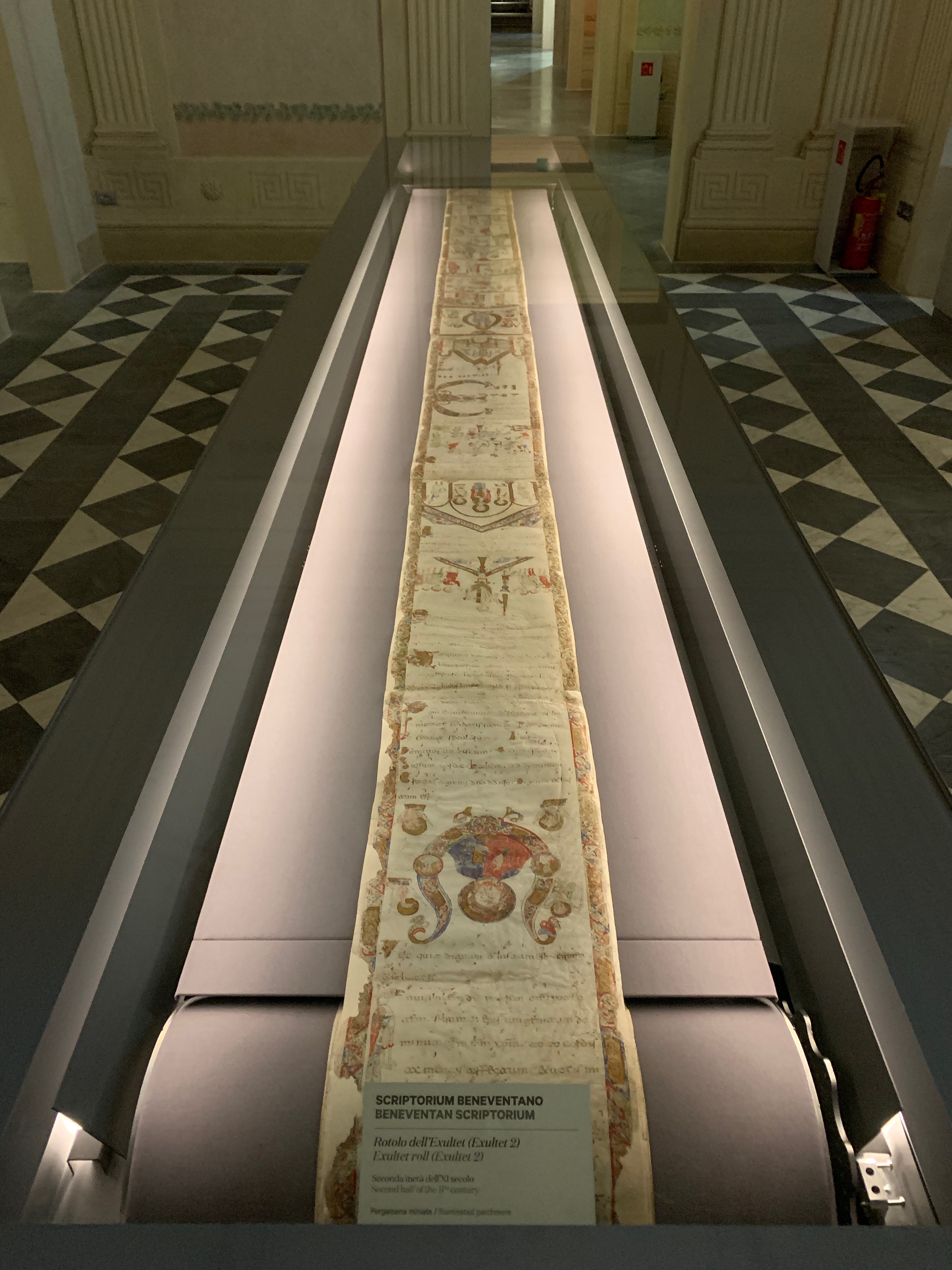
An exultet roll on display in Pisa

An Exultet roll is a long and wide illuminated scroll containing the text and music of the Exultet, the liturgical chant for the Paschal vigil. The material was usually parchment, the layout that of a rotulus (text parallel to the rod), the text in Beneventan script and the music notated in neumes. The illustrations were often upside down relative to the text. As the text was read by the officiant and the scroll unrolled over the pulpit (ambo), the images would appear right-side up to the congregation. The form was peculiar to southern Italy, mainly the area around Benevento and Montecassino, and the surviving examples date from between the 10th and 13th centuries.

The Exultet roll takes its name from the opening words of the chant in Latin: Exultet iam angelica turba coelorum ('Let the angelic host of heaven exult'). These words were sung by the deacon during the blessing and lighting of the Paschal candle at the Easter Vigil. The chant included prayers, canticles and lections. Although based on the Pontifical liturgy, the form of the ceremony of the Exultet as practised in southern Italy is attributed to Archbishop Landulf I of Benevento (r. 957–982). It spread throughout southern Italy largely through the influence of the abbey of Montecassino.

Outside of their one annual liturgical function, Exultet rolls were objects of display. They featured initials decorated with interlace in a distinct Beneventan style and miniatures in a "Byzantinizing" style. They were large, consisting of parchment membranes up to 30 by 80 centimetres (12 in × 31 in) bound end to end to a total length of up to 9 metres (30 ft). The luxurious miniatures are among the largest found in European manuscripts up to that time.

== Gallery ==
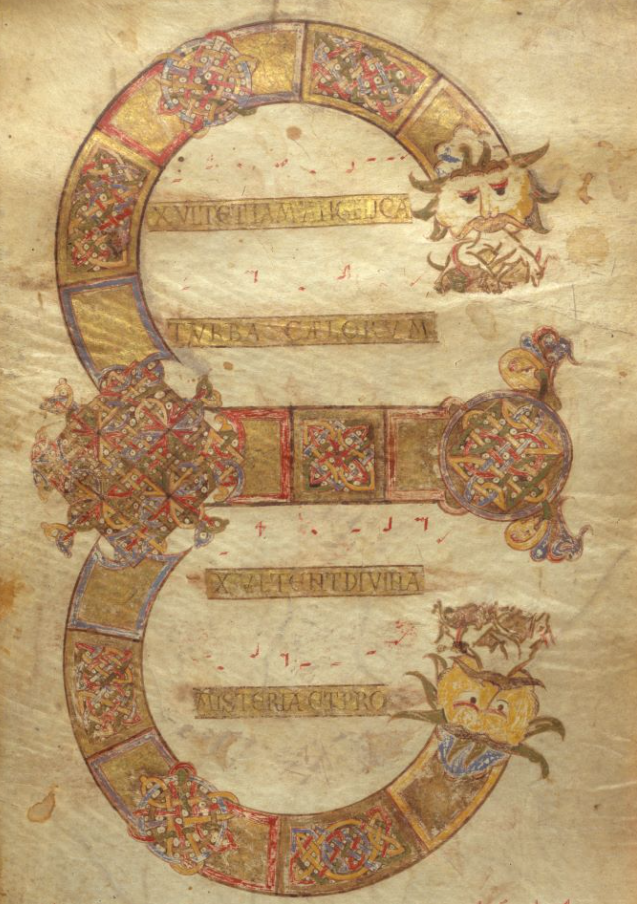
Decorated initial E (text is right-side up)

Celebration of the Paschal vigil (text is upside down)

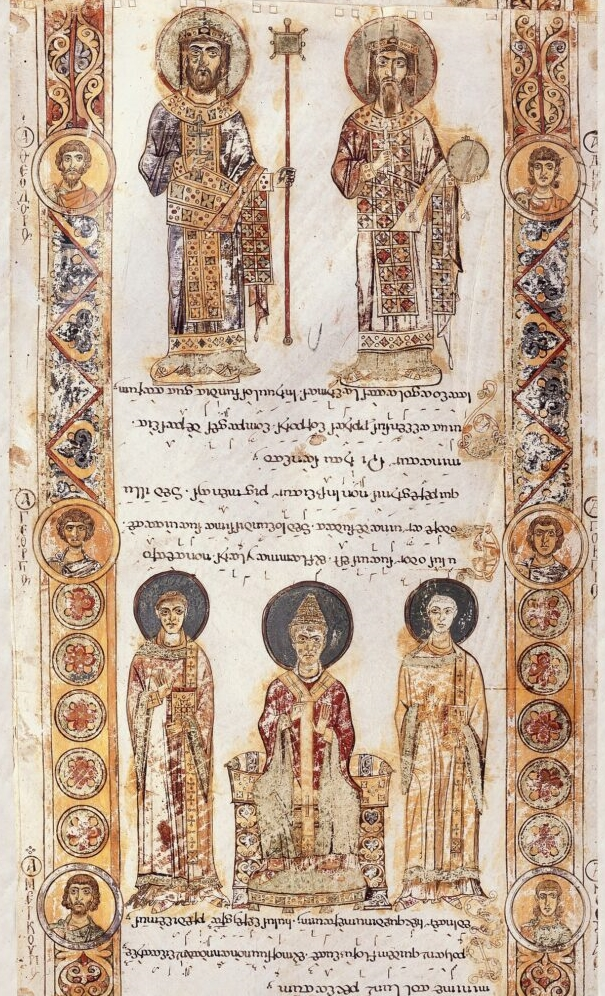
Prayer for the pope and emperor (text is upside down)

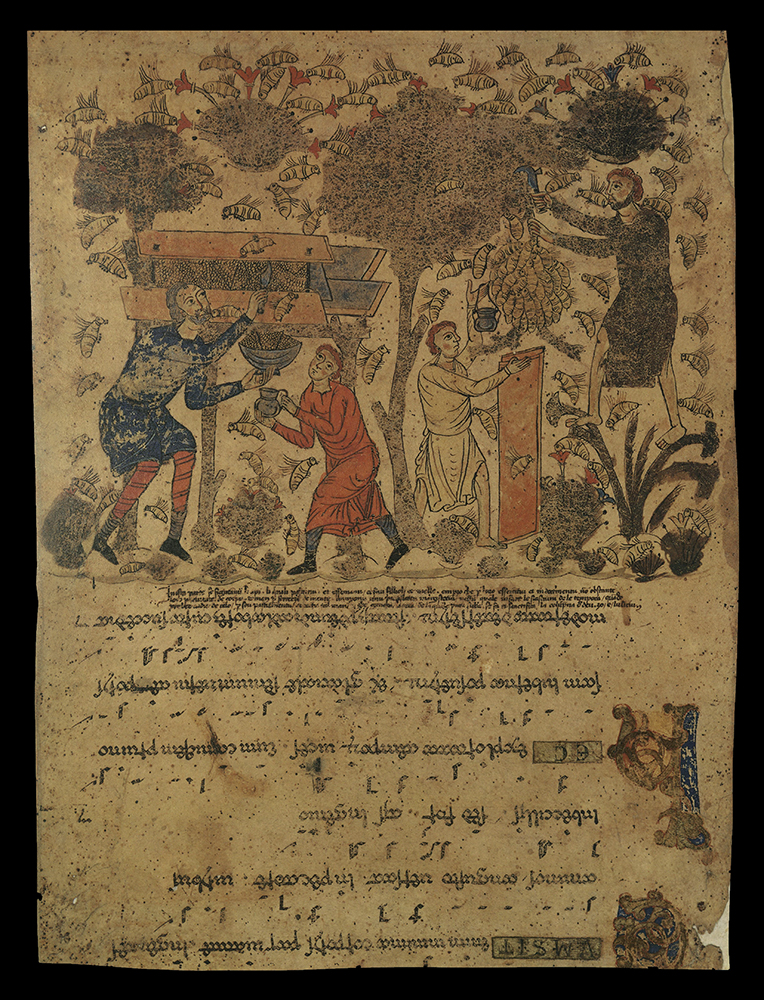
Beekeeping scene (text is upside down)

== Bibliography ==
- Avery, Myrtilla (1936). The Exultet Rolls of South Italy. Princeton University Press.
- Brubaker, Leslie (1984). "Exultet roll". In Joseph R. Strayer (ed.). Dictionary of the Middle Ages. Vol. 4. Charles Scribner's Sons. p. 565.
- Devonshire Jones, Tom; Murray, Linda; Murray, Peter, eds. (2013). "Exsultet (Exultet) rolls". The Oxford Dictionary of Christian Art and Architecture (2nd ed.). Oxford University Press.
- Hourihane, Colum P., ed. (2012). "Exultet rolls". The Grove Encyclopedia of Medieval Art and Architecture. Vol. 1. Oxford University Press. pp. 488–489.
- Kelly, Thomas Forrest (1996). The Exultet in Southern Italy. Oxford University Press.
- Reynolds, Roger E. (2010). "Exultet roll". In Robert E. Bjork (ed.). The Oxford Dictionary of the Middle Ages. Oxford University Press.
- Wilson, N. G. (2010). "Exultet roll". The Oxford Companion to the Book. Oxford University Press.
