= Bolzano Courthouse =

Judiciary building in Bolzano, Italy

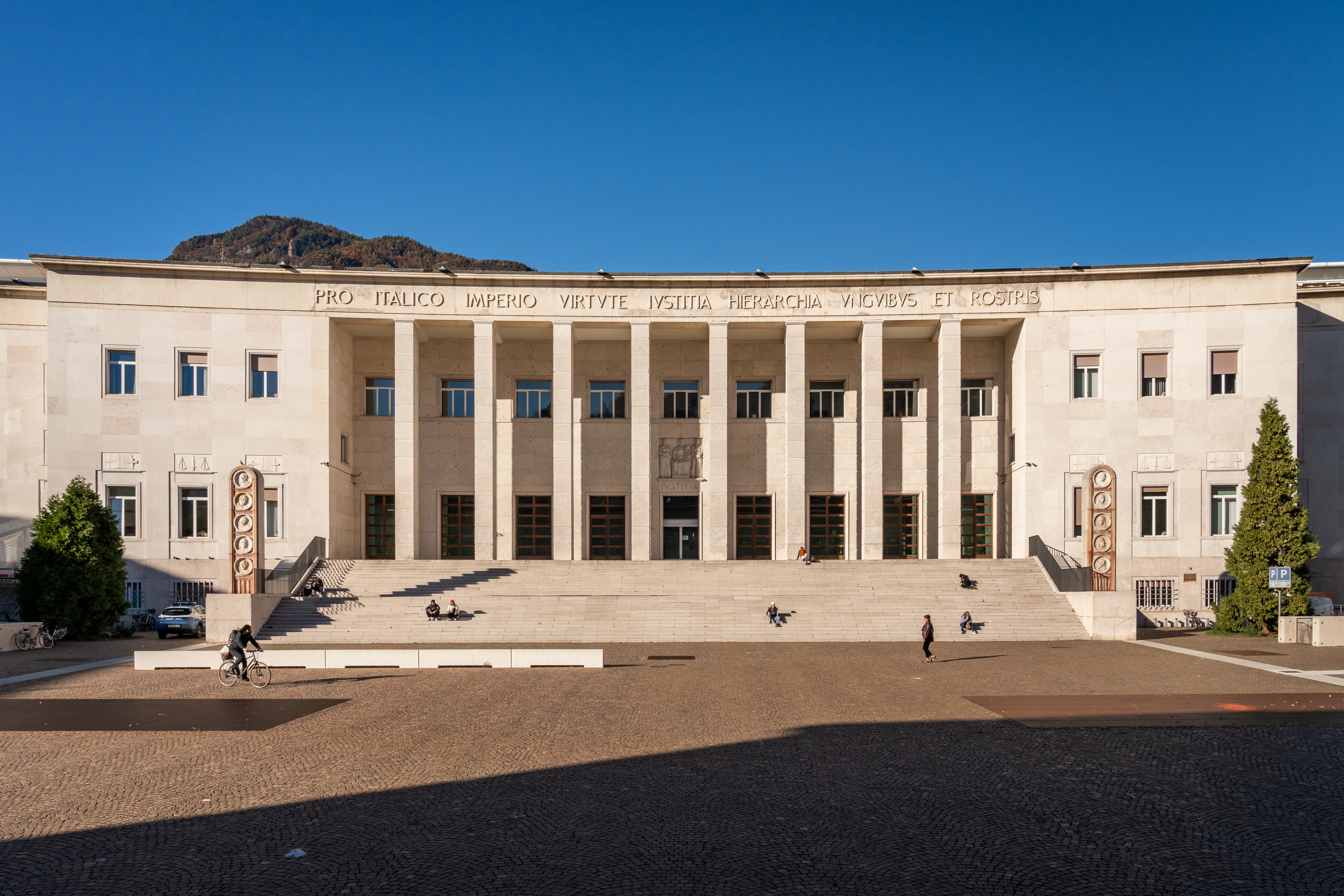
- Interactive map of the Bolzano Courthouse area

General information
- Location: Bolzano, South Tyrol, Italy
- Coordinates: 46°29′53.15″N 11°20′20.96″E
- Construction started: 1939
- Completed: 1956

Design and construction
- Architects: Paolo Rossi de Paoli, Michele Busiri Vici

The Bolzano Courthouse (Palazzo di Giustizia) serves as the main seat of the judicial authorities in Bolzano, Italy. Located on Piazza del Tribunale in the Gries-Quirein district, the large building was designed in the rationalist style by architects Paolo Rossi de Paoli and Michele Busiri Vici. Construction began in 1939 but was not completed until 1956. It houses the Court of Bolzano and the Public Prosecutor's Office.

Part of the courthouse's structure collapsed unexpectedly on 16 July 2026.

== Description ==
The building features a monumental entrance staircase, a travertine-clad façade, and exposed brickwork on the rear. Its concave façade mirrors that of the Casa del Fascio, the former Fascist Party headquarters. Above the main entrance is a relief of the goddess Justitia, depicted without a blindfold, gazing directly at the former party building.

A Latin inscription on the architrave—"Pro Italico Imperio virtute iustitia hierarchia unguibus et rostris" ("For the Italian Empire in virtue, justice, and hierarchy, with claws and beaks")—explicitly refers to Mussolini's so-called Italian Mediterranean Empire of 1936. The palace, together with the Casa del Fascio and the nearby Christ the King Church, was intended to glorify the regime and form a symbolic monumental gateway to the planned "Greater Fascist Bolzano".
