= Serafino Sprovieri =

Italian Roman Catholic archbishop (1930–2018)

- Archbishop of Benevento
- Church: Catholic Church
- Archdiocese: Archdiocese of Benevento
- In office: 25 November 1991 – 3 May 2006
- Predecessor: Carlo Minchiatti
- Successor: Andrea Mugione
- Previous posts: Archbishop of Rossano e Cariati/Rossano-Cariati (1980-1991); Titular Bishop of Themisonium (1978-1980); Auxiliary Bishop of Catanzaro (1978-1980)

Orders
- Ordination: 12 July 1953 by Aniello Calcara
- Consecration: 9 April 1978 by Sebastiano Baggio

Personal details
- Born: 18 May 1930 San Pietro in Guarano, Cosenza, Kingdom of Italy
- Died: 3 January 2018 (aged 87) Cosenza, Italy

Serafino Sprovieri (18 May 1930 – 3 January 2018) was a Roman Catholic archbishop.

Sprovieri was ordained to the priesthood in 1953. He was an auxiliary bishop of the Archdiocese of Catanzaro, Italy, from 1977 to 1980. He was then appointed Archbishop of Rossano-Cariati, where he served from 1980 to 1991. Sprovieri before being Archbishop of Benevento from 1991 to 2006.

Catholic Church titles
Preceded by –	Auxiliary Bishop of Catanzaro; 1977–1980	Succeeded by –
Preceded by Antonio Cantisani as Archbishop of Rossano	Archbishop of Rossano-Cariati; 1980–1991	Succeeded by Andrea Cassone
Preceded by Carlo Minchiatti	Archbishop of Benevento; 1991–2006	Succeeded by Andrea Mugione
