= Leonardo Grifo =

Most Reverend Leonardo Grifo
- Archbishop of Benevento
- Church: Catholic Church
- Archdiocese: Archdiocese of Benevento
- In office: 1482–1485
- Predecessor: Corrado Capece
- Successor: Lorenzo Cibo de' Mari

Personal details
- Died: Oct 1485 Benevento, Italy

Leonardo Grifo (died 1485) was a Roman Catholic prelate who served as Archbishop of Benevento (1482–1485).

== Biography ==
On 23 Sep 1482, Leonardo Grifo was appointed during the papacy of Pope Sixtus IV as Archbishop of Benevento. He served as Archbishop of Benevento until his death in Oct 1485.

== Bibliography ==
- Hofmann, W. Forschungen zur Geschichte der Kurialen Behörden von Schisma bis zur Reformation. Rom 1914, Band II, p. 123. (in German)
- Lee, Egmont (1978). Sixtus IV and Men of Letters. Ed. di Storia e Letteratura. 26. Roma: Bretschneider. pp. 62–66. GGKEY:CWS8W392RYB.
- Kenneth Meyer Setton (1976). The Papacy and the Levant, 1204-1571: The fifteenth century. Philadelphia PA USA: American Philosophical Society. p. 372. ISBN 978-0-87169-127-9.

== External links and additional sources ==
- Cheney, David M. "Archdiocese of Benevento". Catholic-Hierarchy.org. (for Chronology of Bishops) ^{[self-published]}
- Chow, Gabriel. "Archdiocese of Benevento (Italy)". GCatholic.org. (for Chronology of Bishops) ^{[self-published]}

Catholic Church titles
Preceded by Corrado Capece	Archbishop of Benevento; 1482–1485	Succeeded by Lorenzo Cibo de' Mari
