= Archdiocese of Benevento =

Roman Catholic archdiocese in Italy

Archdiocese of Benevento Archidioecesis Beneventana Arcidiocesi di Benevento

Catholic
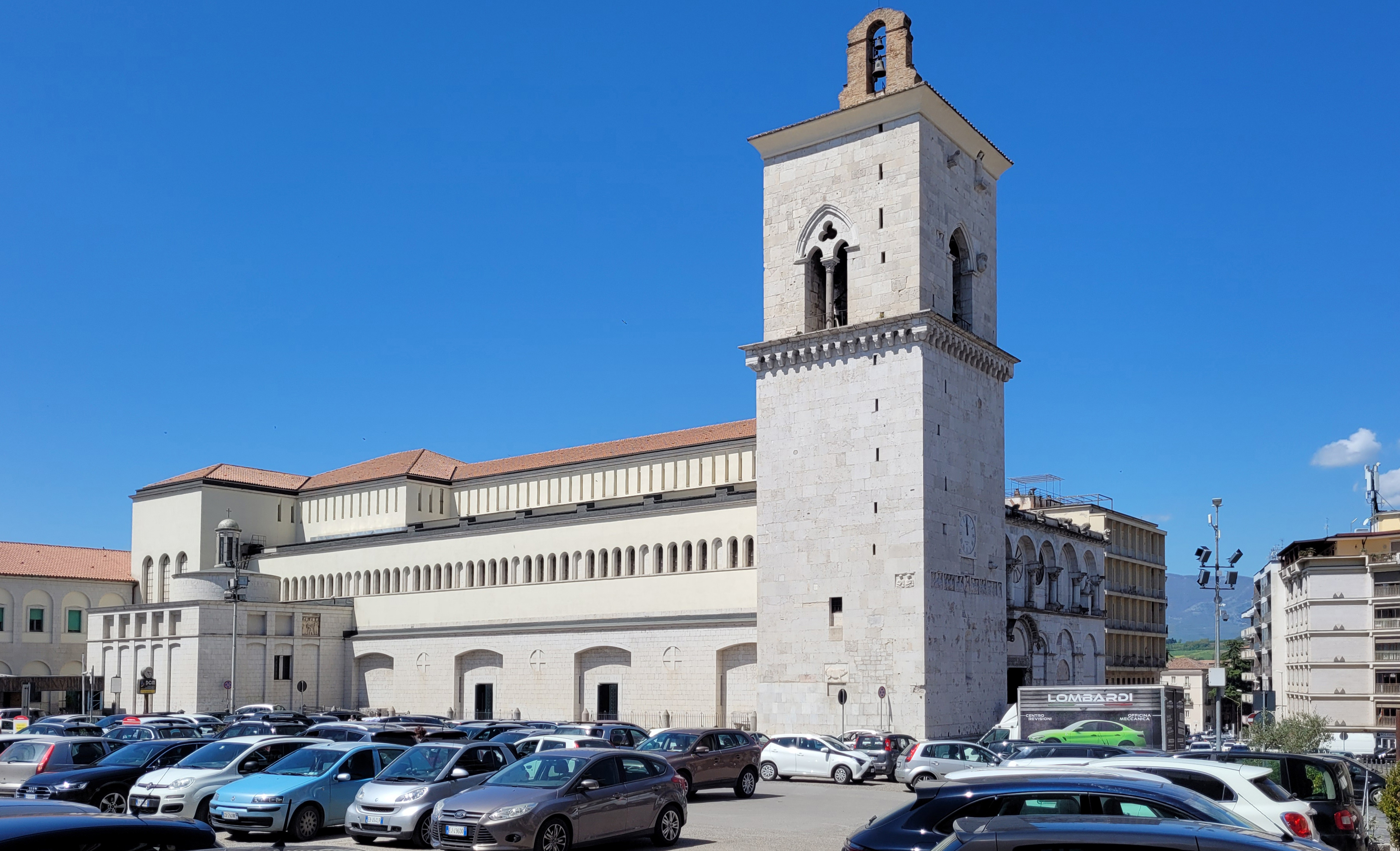
- Cattedrale di Santa Maria Assunta

Location
- Country: Italy
- Territory: Province of Benevento
- Episcopal conference: Episcopal Conference of Italy
- Ecclesiastical region: Campania
- Ecclesiastical province: Benevento
- Coordinates: 41.1298°N 14.7725°E

Statistics
- Area: 1,691 km^{2} (653 sq mi)
- Population: Total; Catholics: (as of 2020); 267,790 (estimate); 263,800 (guess)
- Parishes: 116

Information
- Denomination: Catholic Church
- Sui iuris church: Latin Church
- Rite: Roman Rite
- Established: c. 3rd century (as Diocese of Benevento); 969 (as Archdiocese of Benevento)
- Cathedral: Cattedrale di Maria SS. Assunta in Cielo (Benevento)
- Secular priests: 134 (diocesan); 72 (Religious Orders); 59 Permanent Deacons

Current leadership
- Pope: Leo XIV
- Archbishop: Michele Autuoro
- Bishops emeritus: Andrea Mugione

Map
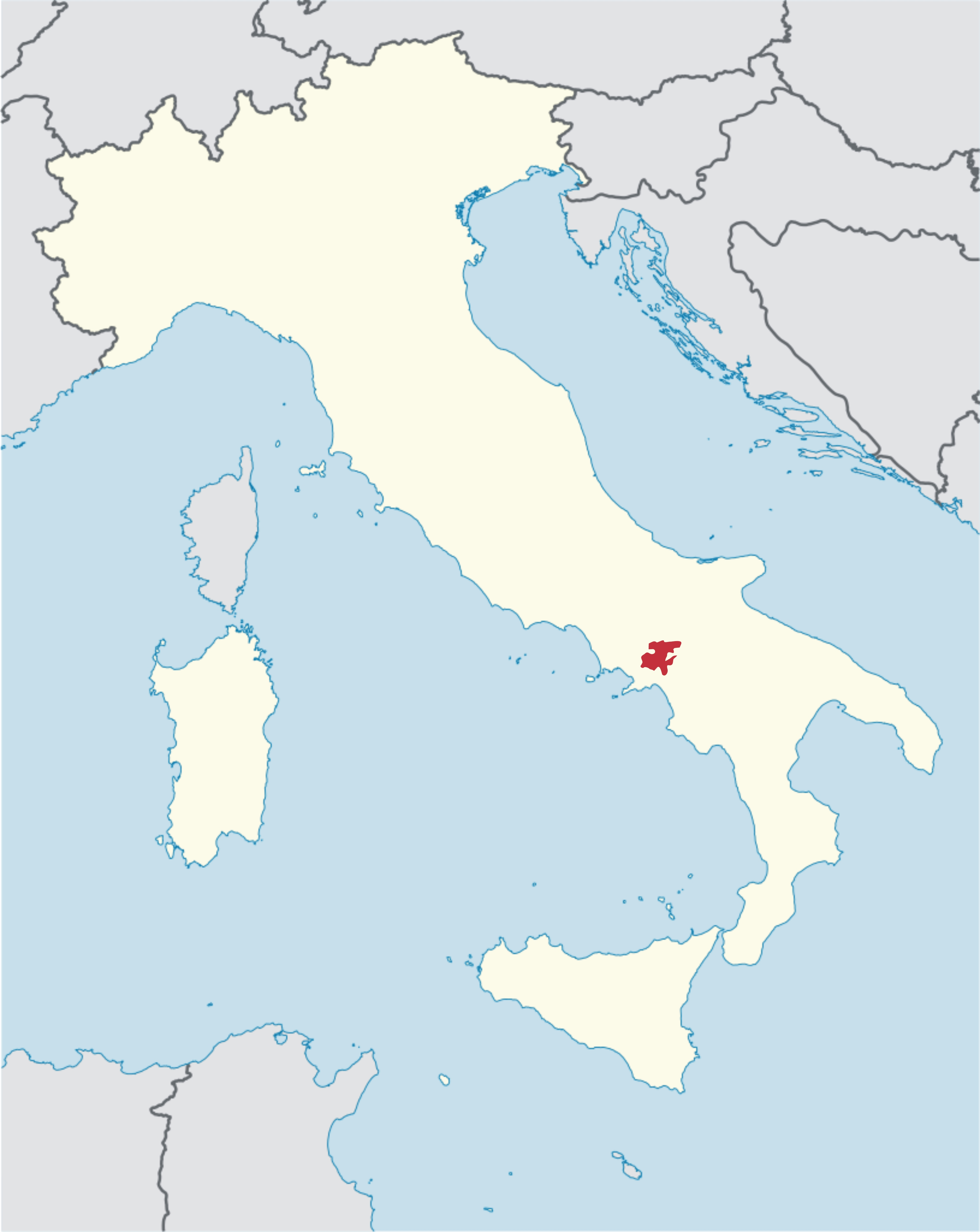
- Location of Archdiocese of Benevento in Italy

Website
- www.diocesidibenevento.it Diocesan web site (Italian)

The Archdiocese of Benevento (Latin: Archidioecesis Beneventana) is a Latin archdiocese of the Catholic Church. It currently has five suffragan dioceses: the diocese of Ariano Irpino-Lacedonia, the diocese of Avellino, the diocese of Cerreto Sannita-Telese-Sant'Agata de' Goti, the Territorial Abbey of Montevergine, and the archdiocese of Sant'Angelo dei Lombardi-Conza-Nusco-Bisaccia.

== History ==
The Roman Catholic Diocese of Benevento was, according to an 11th-century episcopal list, founded in the first century. During the persecution of Diocletian there is a reference to a person named Januarius, who together with Proculus his deacon and two laymen was imprisoned and beheaded at Pozzuoli in 305. He is said to have been the first bishop of Benevento before becoming Bishop of Naples.

The See of Benevento was elevated in status to an archdiocese on 26 May 969, during a synod held at the Vatican Basilica by Pope John XIII. The promotion of the See and of Archbishop Landolfo took place in the presence of, and at the request of, the Emperor Otto I and Prince Pandulph of Benevento and Capua, and his son Landulph. The new metropolitanate had ten suffragan dioceses: Saint Agatha, Avellino, Alife, Ariana, Ascoli, Bibino (Bovinum), Larino, Quintodecimum (earlier at Aeculanum, then at Frigento), Telese, and Volturara.

The ultimate fate of some of these dioceses can be seen through the Provincial Synod of May 1698. When Bishop Francesco Scannagatta of Avellino attended the synod, he signed his name Franciscus Episcopus Abellinensis, Frequintinensis, Aquae-putridae seu Mirabellae, et Quintodecimi, giving clear evidence of the incorporation of three ancient dioceses into the diocese of Avellino. Avellino was still a suffragan of Benevento.

The area of Benevento was struck by a severe earthquake on 11 October 1125, and it was followed immediately by four aftershocks. At midday on 12 October yet another severe shock hit. Nearly all the towers of the fortifications fell, as well as the walls, and the palaces and other edifices. The monastery of San Felice in the diocese of Benevento was completely destroyed. At Termoli the entire façade of the cathedral collapsed. Aftershocks continued for another fifteen days.

On 5 December 1456, Campania and the former duchy of Benevento were hit with a major earthquake, with over 40,000 dead. It may have been the largest on record for all of southern Italy. It was followed by another on 30 December. Benevento was for the most part destroyed, suffering between 350 and 500 dead. Brindisi, with nearly all of its inhabitants, was destroyed. Apice, in the diocese of Benevento, was completely destroyed, as was Casalduni. Two thousand died at Ariano in the territory of Avellino, and the town was in ruins. Lacedonia was reduced to dust and abandoned completely. Sant' Agata dei Goti was assai conquassata ('practically crushed').

=== Synods ===
In August 1059 Pope Nicholas II held a synod at Benevento in the church of S. Peter outside the walls.

On 13 June 1061 a synod was held in the cathedral at Benevento by Archbishop Udalricus. It settled a conflict between Abbot Amico of Santa Sofia and Abbot Leone of Draconaria. In 1075 another synod, held by Archbishop Milo, addressed another conflict between the monastery of Santa Sofia and the Bishop of Draconaria (which was later absorbed into the diocese of San Severo) over the issue of being subject to two bishops.

Pope Victor III held a synod at Benevento in August 1087, at which he excommunicated the antipope Wibert, excommunicated Archbishop Hugh of Lyon and Richard of Marseille, and ordered the deposition of any bishop or abbot who accepted lay investiture.

Pope Urban II held a general synod at Benevento from 28–31 August 1091. At the synod the Pope excommunicated the Emperor Henry IV and his antipope Wibert of Ravenna (called Clement III). It was also decreed that no one should be made a bishop unless he was already in holy orders. The synod also forbade the celebration of matrimony during Advent to the end of the Octave of the Epiphany (6 January).

In 1102 and 1108 Pope Paschal II held synods at Benevento. In the synod of 1108 he repeated his objections to lay investiture, and he forbade clerics from wearing expensive secular clothes. He also consecrated Landolfo as Archbishop of Benevento. Between 16 March and 24 April 1117, Pope Paschal was resident in Benevento. In the synod of April 1117, he excommunicated Maurice Burdinus, Archbishop of Braga, the antipope (1118–1121) of Emperor Henry V, who called himself Gregory VIII.

On 10 March 1119, Archbishop Landolfo held a provincial synod at Benevento, in which anathemas were threatened against persons who committed theft against church property or merchants.

In 1374, Archbishop Hugo stated at a provincial council that the Church of Benevento had twenty-three suffragans, and that documents indicated that at one time it had had thirty-two.

In 1599 Archbishop Massimiliano Palumbara held a diocesan synod, attended by seven of his suffragan bishops. The synod legislated against the practice of clerics removing relics from their containers so that they could be handled by the laity.

During his episcopate, Cardinal Pietro Francesco Orsini de Gravina, O.P. (1686–1730) held two diocesan synods, one in April 1693, and another in May 1698.

During his term of office Archbishop Gianbattista Colombini, O.F.M. Conv. (1763–1774) held eight diocesan synods. Between 1755 and 1762, Cardinal Francesco Pacca held eight diocesan synods. Cardinal Giovanni Battista Pacca held another fourteen, between 1825 and 1838.

=== Cathedral and Chapter ===
The cathedral of Maria SS. Assunta in Cielo was founded in Lombard times, but was destroyed by Allied bombings in World War II; it has kept the medieval Romanesque façade and bell tower, and the 8th century crypt.

In 839 the alleged remains of Saint Bartholomew the Apostle were transferred to the Cathedral, to a chapel which had been built at the order of Prince Siccard of Benevento (d. 839). In 1338 Archbishop Arnaldus de Brussac moved the remains to a reconstructed chapel next to the cathedral.

In 1316 the Cathedral Chapter had eighty-six Canons. In 1364, Archbishop Hugo reduced the number to thirty. The dignities (not dignitaries) included the Archdeacon, the Archpriest, the Primiceralis Major, the Primiceralis Minor, the Treasurer, and Bibliothecarius. In 1674 the Cathedral Chapter contained six dignities and twenty-five Canons. In 1752 there were six dignities and twenty-seven Canons.

There were two other Collegiate Churches in Benevento: that of Saint Bartholomew (founded c. 1137) and that of Santo Spirito (founded in 1350). Each had twelve Canons, headed by a mitred abbot.

== Bishops and archbishops ==
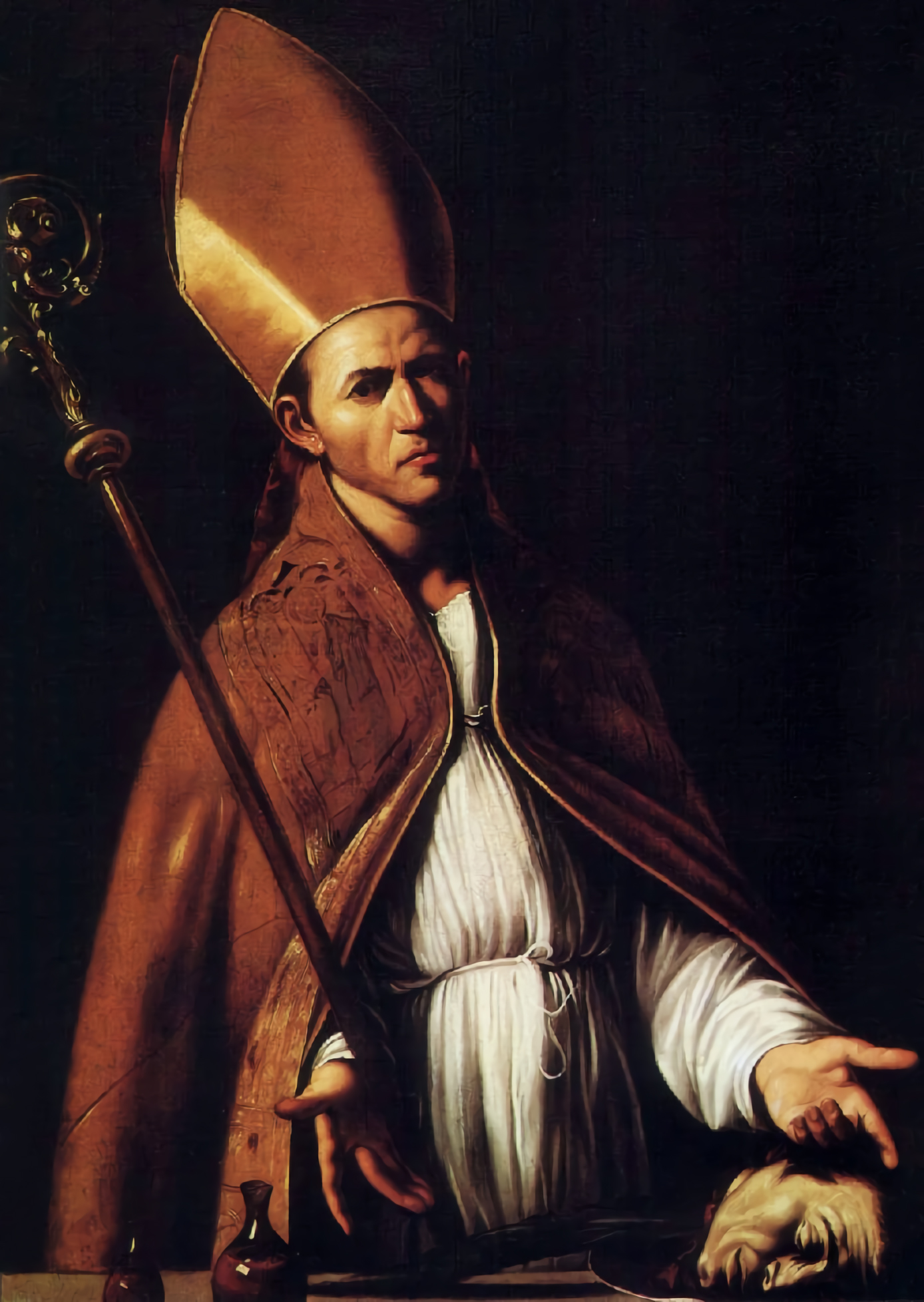
Saint Januarius (in a modern depiction) was the first bishop of the diocese, until his martyrdom in 305.

=== Bishops ===
- Januarius I (until 305)
- Theophilus (313)
- Januarius II (343)
- Emilius (405)
- Dorus (448)
- Epiphanius (c. 494 – c. 499)
- Marcianus (533)
- Barbatus I (602)
- Hildebrand (until 663)
- Barbatus II (663–682)
- Beatus Joannes (684–716)
- Toto (c. 743)
- Monoald (743)
- David (781/82–796)
- Ursus (830)
- Aion (c. 877, 879)
- Petrus I (c. 887–914)
- Joannes I (910–914)
- Joannes II (943–956)

=== Archbishops ===
==== 956 to 1400 ====
- Landolfo I (956–982)
- Alo (Alax) (983)
- Alfano I (985–1005)
- Alfano II (1005–1045)
- Maldefrido (1045–1053)
- Ouldarico (1053–1069)
- Milo (1074–1076)
- Roffredo I (1076–1107)
- Landolfo II (1108–1119)
- Roffredo II (1120–1130)
- Landolfo III (1130–1132)
- Rossemann (c. 1132–c. 1139)
- Gregorio (1132–1145)
- Roscimann (1145–1146)
- Pietro II (1146–1155)
- Enrico (1156–1170)
- Cardinal Lombardo (1171–1179)
- Ruggiero (1179–1221)
- Ugolino (1221–1254)
- Capoferro (1254–1280)
- Giovanni Castrocoeli (1282–1295)
- Giovanni d'Alatri (1295–1300)
- Adenolfo (1301–1302)
- Giacomo de Viterbio, O.E.S.A. (1302–1303)
- Monaldo Monaldeschi, O.Min. (1303–1331)
- Arnaldo de Brusacco (1332–1344)
- Guglielmo Isnardi, O.Min. (1344–1346)
- Stefano Dupin (1346–1350)
- Pietro Dupin (1350–1360)
- Geraud (1360)
- Guillaume (1362)
- Ugone de Rupto, O.P. (1363–1365)
- Ugone Guidardi (1365–1383)
- Francesco Uguccione (1383–1384)
- Niccolò Zanasio (1383–1385)
- Donato d'Aquino (1385–1426)

==== 1400–1730 ====
- Paolo Capranica (1427–1428)
- Gaspare Colonna (1430–1435)
- Astorgio Agnensi (1436–1451)
- Giacomo Della Ratta (1451–1460)
- Alessio de Cesari (1460–1464)
- Niccolò Piccolomini (1464–1467)
- Corrado Capece (1469–1482)
- Leonardo Grifo (1482–1485)
- Cardinal Lorenzo Cibo de' Mari (1486–1502)
- Cardinal Ludovico Podocatar (1504) Administrator
- Cardinal Galeotto Franciotti della Rovere (1504–1507) Administrator
- Cardinal Sisto Gara della Rovere (1508–1514) Administrator
- Cardinal Alessandro Farnese (1514–1522) Administrator
- Francesco della Rovere (1530–1544)
- Giovanni della Casa (1544–1556)
- Cardinal Alessandro Farnese (1556–1560)
- Giacomo Savelli (1560–1574)
- Massimiliano Palumbara (1574–1607)
- Cardinal Pompeio Arrigoni (1607–1616)
- Alessandro di Sangro (1616–1633)
- Cardinal Agostino Oreggi (1633–1635)
- Cardinal Vincenzo Maculani, O.P. (1642–1643)
- Giovanni Battista Foppa (1643–1673)
- Giuseppe Bologna (1674–1680)
- Cardinal Girolamo Gastaldi (1680–1685)
- Cardinal Pietro Francesco Orsini de Gravina, O.P. (1686–1730)

==== since 1730 ====
- Cardinal Niccolò Coscia (1730–1731)
- Cardinal Sinibaldo Doria (1731–1733)
- Cardinal Serafino Cenci (1733–1740)
- Cardinal Francesco Landi Pietra (1741–1752)
- Francesco Pacca (1752–1763)
- Gianbattista Colombini, O.F.M. Conv. (1763–1774)
- Cardinal Francesco Maria Banditi, C.R. (Theat.) (1775–1796)
- Domenico Spinucci (1796–1823)
- Cardinal Giovanni Battista Bussi (1755–1844) (1824–1844)
- Cardinal Domenico Carafa della Spina di Traetto (1844–1879)
- Cardinal Camillo Siciliano di Rende (1879–1897)
- Cardinal Donato Maria Dell'Olio (1898–1902)
- Benedetto Bonazzi, O.S.B. (1902–1915)
- Cardinal Alessio Ascalesi, C.Pp.S. (1915–1924)
- Luigi Lavitrano (1924–1928)
- Adeodato Giovanni Piazza, O.C.D. (1930–1935)
- Agostino Mancinelli (1936–1962)
- Raffaele Calabria (1962–1982)
- Carlo Minchiatti (1982–1991)
- Serafino Sprovieri (1991–2006)
- Andrea Mugione (2006–2016)
- Felice Accrocca (2016–2026)
- Michele Autuoro (2026–present)

== Books ==
=== Reference works ===
- Gams, Pius Bonifatius (1873). Series episcoporum Ecclesiae catholicae (in Latin). Ratisbon: Typis et Sumptibus Georgii Josephi Manz. pp. 671–674.
- Eubel, Conradus, ed. (1913). Hierarchia catholica (in Latin). Vol. I (second ed.). Münster: Libreria Regensbergiana.
- Eubel, Conradus, ed. (1914). Hierarchia catholica (in Latin). Vol. II (second ed.). Münster: Libreria Regensbergiana.
- Eubel, Conradus; Gulik, Guilelmus (1923). Hierarchia catholica (in Latin). Vol. III (second ed.). Münster: Libreria Regensbergiana.
- Gauchat, Patritius (Patrice) (1935). Hierarchia catholica (in Latin). Vol. IV (1592-1667). Münster: Libraria Regensbergiana.
- Ritzler, Remigius; Sefrin, Pirminus (1952). Hierarchia catholica medii et recentis aevi (in Latin). Vol. V (1667-1730). Patavii: Messagero di S. Antonio.
- Ritzler, Remigius; Sefrin, Pirminus (1958). Hierarchia catholica medii et recentis aevi (in Latin). Vol. VI (1730-1799). Patavii: Messagero di S. Antonio.
- Ritzler, Remigius; Sefrin, Pirminus (1968). Hierarchia Catholica medii et recentioris aevi... (in Latin). Vol. VII (1800–1846). Monasterii: Libr. Regensburgiana.
- Remigius Ritzler; Pirminus Sefrin (1978). Hierarchia catholica Medii et recentioris aevi (in Latin). Vol. VIII (1846–1903). Il Messaggero di S. Antonio.
- Pięta, Zenon (2002). Hierarchia catholica medii et recentioris aevi... (in Latin). Vol. IX (1903-1922). Padua: Messagero di San Antonio. ISBN 978-88-250-1000-8.

=== Studies ===
- Borgia, Stefano (1763). Memorie istoriche della pontificia cittá di Benevento dal secolo VIII. al secolo XVIII. divise in tre parti (in Italian). Vol. Parte prima. Roma: Salomoni. Stefano Borgia (1764). Parte seconda. Parte terza volume 1. 1769.
- Cappelletti, Giuseppe (1845). Le Chiese d'Italia dalla loro origine sino ai nostri giorni (in Italian). Vol. Tomo terzo (3). Venezia: Antonelli. pp. 9–146.
- Cardella, Lorenzo (1793). Memorie storiche de cardinali della Santa romana chiesa ... (in Italian). Vol. Tomo settimo (7). Roma: Pagliarini.
- Kehr, Paul Fridolin (1962). Regesta pontificum Romanorum. Italia pontificia, Vol.IX: Samnium—Apulia—Lucania. ed. Walter Holtzmann. Berlin: Weidemann. (in Latin)
- Lanzoni, Francesco (1927). Le diocesi d'Italia dalle origini al principio del secolo VII (an. 604). Faenza: F. Lega (in Italian) pp. 254–263.
- Orsini, Vincentius Maria (1724). Giannini, Francescoi (ed.). Synodicon S. Beneventanensis ecclesiae: continens concilia XXI (in Latin) (secunda ed.). ex typographia Rochi Bernarbò.
- Ughelli, Ferdinando; Coleti, Nicolaus (1721). Italia sacra, sive de episcopis Italiae, et insularum adjacentium (in Latin). Vol. Tomus octavus (8). Venezia: Apud Sebastianum Coleti. pp. 3–188.
- Zigarelli, Daniello Maria (1860). Storia di Benevento (in Italian). Napoli: Tipografia Lista. pp. 132–167.

==== Acknowledgment ====
(article written by Umberto Benigni)
