= Niccolò Piccolomini =

Most Reverend Niccolò Piccolomini
- Archbishop of Benevento
- Church: Catholic Church
- Archdiocese: Archdiocese of Benevento
- In office: 1464–1467
- Predecessor: Alessio de Cesari
- Successor: Corrado Capece

Personal details
- Died: 21 September 1467 Benevento, Italy

Niccolò Piccolomini (died 1467) was a Roman Catholic prelate who served as Archbishop of Benevento (1464–1467).

== Biography ==
On 3 August 1464, Niccolò Piccolomini was appointed during the papacy of Pope Pius II as Archbishop of Benevento. He served as Archbishop of Benevento until his death on 21 Sep 1467.

== External links and additional sources ==
- Cheney, David M. "Archdiocese of Benevento". Catholic-Hierarchy.org. (for Chronology of Bishops) ^{[self-published]}
- Chow, Gabriel. "Archdiocese of Benevento (Italy)". GCatholic.org. (for Chronology of Bishops) ^{[self-published]}

Catholic Church titles
Preceded by Alessio de Cesari	Archbishop of Benevento; 1464–1467	Succeeded by Corrado Capece
