= Corrado Capece =

Italian Roman Catholic prelate

Most Reverend Corrado Capece
- Archbishop of Benevento
- Church: Catholic Church
- Archdiocese: Archdiocese of Benevento
- In office: 1467–1482
- Predecessor: Niccolò Piccolomini
- Successor: Leonardo Grifo

Personal details
- Died: 1482 Benevento, Italy

Corrado Capece (died 1482) was a Roman Catholic prelate who served as Archbishop of Benevento (1467–1482).

== Biography ==
On 30 Oct 1467, Corrado Capece was appointed during the papacy of Pope Paul II as Archbishop of Benevento. He served as Archbishop of Benevento until his death in 1482.

== External links and additional sources ==
- Cheney, David M. "Archdiocese of Benevento". Catholic-Hierarchy.org. (for Chronology of Bishops) ^{[self-published]}
- Chow, Gabriel. "Archdiocese of Benevento (Italy)". GCatholic.org. (for Chronology of Bishops) ^{[self-published]}

Catholic Church titles
Preceded by Niccolò Piccolomini	Archbishop of Benevento; 1467–1482	Succeeded by Leonardo Grifo
