= Donato Maria Dell'Olio =

19th and 20th-century Italian Catholic cardinal

His Eminence Donato Maria Dell'Olio
- Archbishop of Benevento
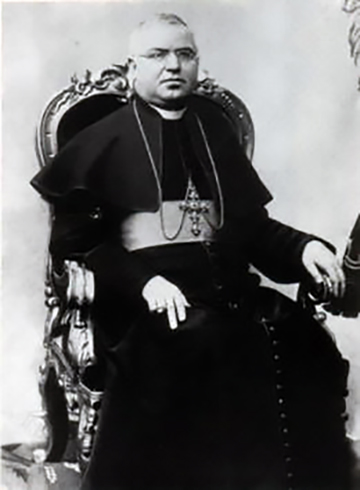
- Church: Roman Catholic Church
- Archdiocese: Benevento
- See: Benevento
- Appointed: 5 February 1898
- Installed: 29 May 1898
- Term ended: 18 January 1902
- Predecessor: Camillo Siciliano di Rende
- Successor: Benedetto Bonazzi
- Other post: Cardinal-Priest of Santa Balbina (1901-02)
- Previous post: Archbishop of Rossano (1891-98)

Orders
- Ordination: 23 December 1871 by Giuseppe de' Bianchi Dottula
- Consecration: 20 December 1891 by Raffaele Monaco La Valletta
- Created cardinal: 15 April 1901 by Pope Leo XIII
- Rank: Cardinal-Priest

Personal details
- Born: Donato Maria Dell'Olio; 27 December 1847 Bisceglie, Kingdom of the Two Sicilies
- Died: 18 January 1902 (aged 54) Benevento, Kingdom of Italy
- Buried: Bisceglie Cathedral (since 1972)
- Parents: Giacinto dell'Olio; Pasqua Augurano
- Education: Pontifical University of Saint Thomas Aquinas
- Motto: Praemium iustitiae pax

Donato Maria Dell'Olio (Bisceglie, 27 December 1847 – Benevento, 18 January 1902) was an Italian cardinal and Catholic archbishop.

== Biography ==
Dell'Olio studied at the seminary in Bisceglie and then at the Pontifical University of Saint Thomas Aquinas in Rome, where his professors included the future cardinal Tommaso Maria Zigliara. In 1873, he received the rank of Doctor of Theology.

Dell'Olio was ordained as a priest on 23 December 1871. In 1876, he became professor of philosophy and theology at the seminary in Bisceglie. In 1882, he founded the institute "Giovanni Bosco".

On 14 December 1891, Dell'Olio was elected archbishop of Rossano and on 20 December of the same year, he was consecrated as bishop in Rome by cardinal Raffaele Monaco La Valletta.

On 5 February 1898, Dell'Olio was promoted to Archbishop of Benevento. The diocese welcomed him on 29 May 1898. In that city, he founded the Ateneo Pontificio in 1899.

In Dell'Olio's speech at the inauguration of the institution, the cardinal said:

I have sought from the beginning, an idea, almost a dream, a dream of those who love good and cannot reach it: But now, gentlemen, that which in the beginning seemed a dream, thanks to the beneficence of Leo XIII, whom the people of Benevento hold in the utmost esteem with every thought... is a solemn reality, and is before our eyes (and you are such a great part of it), that is, the Theological-Juridicial Institute in the augmented form of a Pontifical University. The day has come, in which you gentlemen chosen to hold the professorial chairs and you dear young boys embarking on noble studies will enter the palaistra prepared for you, the one group to spread the doctrines of the science of divinity, the other to attain them

Pope Leo XIII raised Dell'Olio to the rank of cardinal in the Papal consistory of 15 April 1901 and he received the titular church of Santa Balbina.

On 16 June 1901, Dell'Olio was in Benevento to consecrate the Basilica della Madonna delle Grazie and its altar which was "a splendid gift from the munificence of Leo XIII."

Dell'Olio died at Benevento, at the age of 54 and his body was buried in the city of Benevento in the old cemetery of Santa Clementina.

== Bibliography ==
- Martin Bräuer (2014). Handbuch der Kardinäle: 1846-2012 (in German). Berlin: De Gruyter. pp. 189–190. ISBN 978-3-11-026947-5.
- sac. (Rev.) Ferdinando Grassi, I Pastori della cattedra beneventana, tipografia-auxiliatrix-Benevento 1969;
- Donato Maria Dell'Olio, discorso per l'inaugurazione dell' Ateneo nella città di Benevento, Tip. De Martini, Benevento 1899.

Catholic Church titles
| Preceded by Salvatore Palmieri | Archbishop of Rossano; 14 December 1891 - 5 February 1898 | Succeeded by Orazio Mazzella |
| Preceded by Camillo Siciliano di Rende | Archbishop of Benevento; 5 February 1898 - 18 January 1902 | Succeeded by Benedetto Bonazzi |
| Preceded by Amilcare Malagola | Cardinal priest of Santa Balbina; 18 April 1901 - 18 January 1902 | Succeeded by Auguste-René-Marie Dubourg |
