= Ettore Cunial =

Italian prelate of the Catholic Church (1905-2005)

His Excellency, The Most Reverend Ettore Cunial
- Church: Roman Catholic Church
- Archdiocese: Soteropolis
- Appointed: 11 April 1953
- Installed: 17 May 1953
- Term ended: 6 October 2005
- Previous posts: Vicegerent of Rome (1953-1972); Vice Camerlengo of the Apostolic Camera (1975-2004)

Orders
- Ordination: 17 May 1953
- Rank: Archbishop

Personal details
- Born: 16 November 1905 Possagno, Kingdom of Italy
- Died: 6 October 2005 (aged 99) Possagno, Italy
- Denomination: Roman Catholic
- Motto: Esto vigilans ('Be watchful'; Revelation 3:2)

Ettore Cunial (November 16, 1905 – October 6, 2005) was an Italian prelate.

Born in Possagno in the Province of Treviso on 16 November 1905, Cunial was ordained priest in 1929 and ordained bishop in 1953. In 1953, his appointment as Titular Archbishop of Soteropolis and Vicegerent of Rome followed. He was appointed Vice Camerlengo of the Holy Roman Church by Pope Paul VI in 23 December 1975, and did not retire until 23 October 2004, even though the customary retirement age for the Roman Curia is 75, and very few are permitted by exception to remain in office past 80.

In February 2005 the death of Corrado Bafile left Cunial the oldest Catholic bishop in the world. Cunial died on 6 October 2005 in Castelfranco Veneto just six weeks before he would have turned 100.
