= Soterioupolis =

Ancient city in Anatolia

Coordinates: 43°6′N 40°16′E

Soterioupolis (Greek: Σωτηριούπολις; "City of the Saviour") or Soteropolis (Σωτηρόπολις) was a Byzantine fortress in the southeastern Black Sea coast during the 10th–12th centuries. The name has been suggested to apply to two different localities, Pitsunda in Abkhazia and Borçka in Turkey.

== Byzantine town ==
According to the mid-10th century De administrando imperio, Soterioupolis was located on the border with Abasgia, while seal finds attest that it was the capital of a border district or kleisoura. The Escorial Taktikon, written in the 970s, mentions a "strategos of Soterioupolis or Bourzo", and the contemporary Notitiae Episcopatuum record that it was the seat of an autonomous archbishopric.

The site's identification has been disputed: Alexander Kazhdan in the Oxford Dictionary of Byzantium dismisses the suggestions expressed by various authors for an identification with Pitsunda or Sukhumi, and considers Soterioupolis to have been a single site. Werner Seibt and Ivan Jordanov, on the other hand, distinguish between the various references of the name, equating the Soterioupolis of the De administrando imperio with Pitsunda, which in the mid-11th century formed part of a military command with nearby Anakopia, securing Byzantine presence in coastal Abkhazia and the northwestern Caucasus in general, where Byzantium had commercial and strategic interests. The seat of the strategos of the Escorial Taktikon, however, is considered to be located further south, at the fortress Bourzo (identified by Nicolas Oikonomides and B. Baumgartner with modern Borçka in Turkey), to which are to be attributed the seals of the kleisourarches of Soteropolis, as well as the references preserved in the collection of miracles of Saint Eugenios of Trebizond, according to which the strategos was a subordinate of the doux of Chaldia.

== Titular see ==
In modern times, the town has been a titular see of the Roman Catholic Church, as the Archdiocese of Soteropolis. First awarded in 1932, it has had seven holders and has been vacant since 6 October 2005, with the death of its last incumbent, Ettore Cunial.

== Sources ==
- Kazhdan, Alexander (1991). "Soterioupolis". In Kazhdan, Alexander (ed.). The Oxford Dictionary of Byzantium. Oxford and New York: Oxford University Press. p. 1930. ISBN 978-0-19-504652-6.
- Seibt, Werner; Jordanov, Ivan (2006). "Στρατηγὸς Σωτηρουπόλεως καὶ Ἀνακουπίας. Ein mittelbyzantinisches Kommando in Abchasien (11. Jahrhundert)". In Cheynet, Jean-Claude (ed.). Studies in Byzantine Sigillography, Volume 9 (in German). Munich and Leipzig: K. G. Saur Verlag. pp. 231–239. ISBN 3-598-77927-5.
