= Landulf I (archbishop of Benevento) =

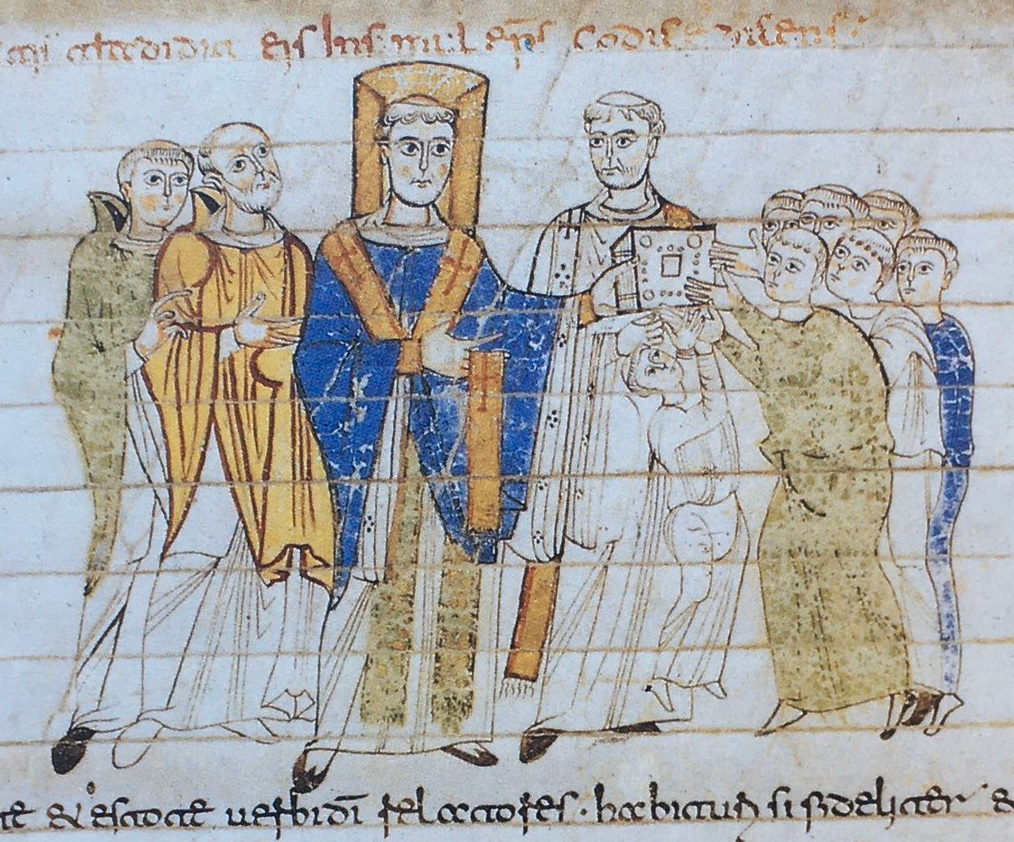
Landulf as archbishop, with a square nimbus and pallium, giving a jewelled codex to a lector as the symbol of his lectorship. From Casanatense 724.

Landulf I (died 982) was the bishop of Benevento from 956 and the first archbishop of Benevento from 969.

Landulf was installed as bishop no later than 19 December 956, because on that date Pope John XII addressed a letter to him. In February 967, the Holy Roman Emperor Otto I visited Benevento and confirmed for Landulf his direct jurisdiction over the diocese of Siponto (which was effectively joined to that of Benevento) and over the sanctuary of San Michele Arcangelo sul Monte Gargano in a diploma dated 13 February. The city of Siponto at the time lay within the Byzantine catepanate of Italy, outside of Otto's power.

On 26 May 969, at a synod in Rome presided over by Pope John XIII, Benevento became the second diocese in southern Italy to be raised to metropolitan rank after Capua (between 966 and 968). This synod was also attended by Otto I and Prince Pandulf I of Benevento, who both interceded on behalf of the diocese. These changes in the religious landscape of southern Italy took place amidst ongoing conflict between the Holy Roman Empire and the Byzantine Empire for dominance in southern Italy. In 968, the Byzantine Emperor Nikephoros II raised Otranto to metropolitan rank. The promotion of Benevento was a response to Nikephoros's initiative. John XIII's bull addressed to Landulf confirming the promotion was also dated 26 May 969. The bull lists the suffragan dioceses under Landulf as Sant'Agata dei Goti, Avellino, Frigento, Ariano, Ascoli, Bovino, Vulturara, Larino, Telese and Alife. It also confirms the status of Siponto and Monte Gargano.

Landulf is well known for overseeing the production of several liturgical rotulae (scrolls) in Beneventan script now kept in the Biblioteca Casanatense in Rome. These were probably produced at the monastery of Santa Sofia. One of these, the benedictional Casanatense 724, ends with the words "I am Bishop Landulf's" (LANDOLFI EPISCOPI SUM) in gold capital block letters. It contains twelve illustrations of the archbishop giving ordinations and benedictions. The Exultet roll Vaticana lat. 9820 is a copy of one originally made for Landulf.

Landulf died in 982.
