= Calopezzati =

Calopezzati Greek: Kalopetsàdes
- Comune
- Comune di Calopezzati
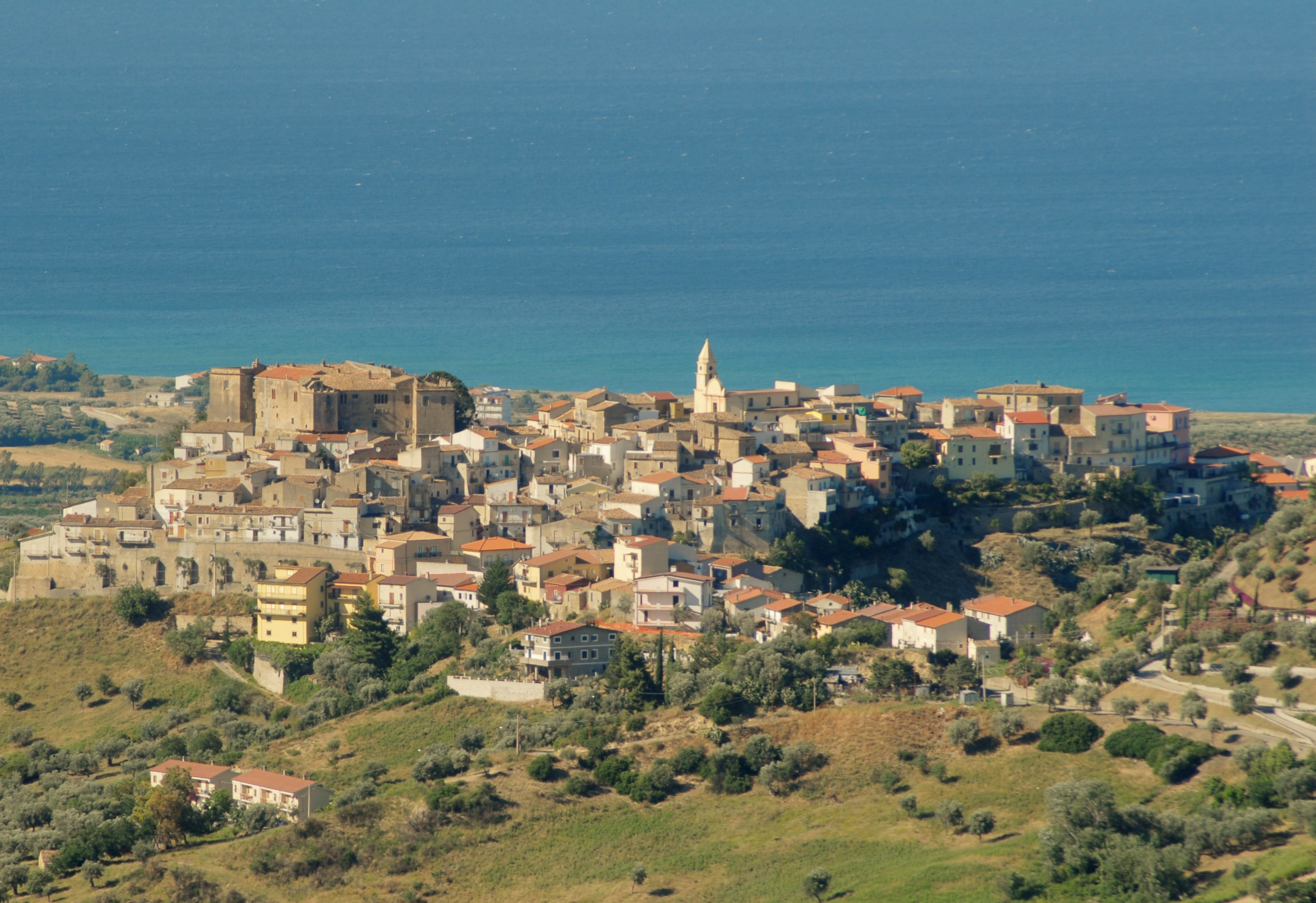
- View of Calopezzati

- Location within Italy Location within Calabria
- Coordinates: 39°34′N 16°48′E
- Country: Italy
- Region: Calabria
- Province: Cosenza (CS)

Government
  - Mayor: Edoardo Antonello Giudiceandrea

Area
  - Total: 22.57 km^{2} (8.71 sq mi)
- Elevation: 217 m (712 ft)

Population (2018-01-01)
  - Total: 1,207
  - Density: 53.48/km^{2} (138.5/sq mi)
- Demonym: Calopezzatesi
- Time zone: UTC+1 (CET)
  - Summer (DST): UTC+2 (CEST)
- Postal code: 87060
- Dialing code: 0983
- Patron saint: St. Francis of Paola
- Saint day: 2 April
- Website: Official website

Calopezzati (Calabrian: Caluopizzàtu) is a town and comune in the province of Cosenza in the Calabria region of southern Italy.
