= Domenico Carafa della Spina di Traetto =

Roman Catholic Cardinal

His Eminence Domenico Carafa della Spina di Traetto
- Archbishop Emeritus of Benevento
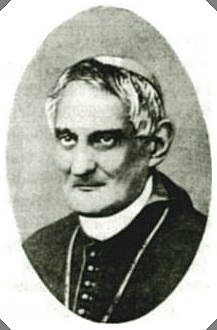
- Church: Roman Catholic Church
- Archdiocese: Benevento
- See: Benevento
- Appointed: 22 July 1844
- Term ended: 12 May 1879
- Predecessor: Giovanni Battista Bussi
- Successor: Camillo Siciliano di Rende
- Other post: Cardinal-Priest of San Lorenzo in Lucina (1879)
- Previous posts: Cardinal-Priest of Santa Maria degli Angeli (1844–79); Camerlengo of the College of Cardinals (1864–65)

Orders
- Ordination: 30 May 1841
- Consecration: 11 August 1844 by Vincenzo Macchi
- Created cardinal: 22 July 1844 by Pope Gregory XVI
- Rank: Cardinal-Priest

Personal details
- Born: Domenico Carafa della Spina di Traetto; 12 July 1805 Naples, Kingdom of Naples
- Died: 17 June 1879 (aged 73) Naples, Kingdom of Italy
- Parents: Francesco Carafa della Spina; Paola Orsini
- Education: Pontifical Academy of Ecclesiastical Nobles

Domenico Carafa della Spina di Traetto (12 July 1805 – 17 June 1879) was a Catholic Cardinal, Archbishop of Benevento and Camerlengo of the Sacred College of Cardinals.

== Personal life ==
Carafa was born in Naples, Italy on 12 July 1805. He was the son of Palatine Prince and Count Francesco Carafa della Spina, 3rd duke of Traetto, and Paola Orsini, of the princes of Solofra and the dukes of Gravina.

He was educated at the Collegio Nazareno in Rome (1817 to 1823) and at the Pontifical Academy of Ecclesiastical Nobles in Rome (1823). He also received a doctorate in utroque iuris, both civil and canon law on 22 July 1826.

== Church service ==
Carafa was ordained as a priest at age 35 on 30 May 1841.

Only three years later on 22 July 1844, Carafa was elevated to Cardinal and appointed Archbishop of Benevento and Cardinal-Priest of S. Maria degli Angeli

Carafa was expelled from Benevento in 1860 after its annexation to the Italian kingdom.

== Vatican service ==
Carafa was appointed Camerlengo of the Sacred College of Cardinals between 1864 and 1865.

He was also appointed Secretary of Apostolic Briefs on 30 January 1879 and Grand Chancellor of the Pontifical Military Orders.

== Council and conclaves ==
Carafa attended the First Vatican Council in 1869 and the Papal Conclaves of 1846 (which elected Pope Pius IX) and 1878 (which elected Pope Leo XIII).

== Final appointment and death ==
On 12 May 1879, Carafa received his final assignment; appointment as Cardinal-Priest of S. Lorenzo in Lucina. He died the following month on 17 June 1879, though some biographies suggest he died the previous day on 16 June 1879.

He lay in state in the metropolitan cathedral of Naples and was buried, temporarily, in the chapel of the archconfraternity of the Bianchi dello Spirito Santo, in the new cemetery of that city.

On his death he was the last surviving cardinal elevated by Pope Gregory XVI.

Catholic Church titles
Preceded by Niccola Paracciani Clarelli	Camerlengo of the Sacred College of Cardinals; 1864–1865	Succeeded by Sisto Riario Sforza
