= Felice Accrocca =

Italian bishop of the Catholic Church (born 1959)

The Most Reverend Felice Accrocca
- Bishop of Assisi-Nocera Umbra-Gualdo Tadino and Foligno
- Diocese: Assisi-Nocera Umbra-Gualdo Tadino and Foligno
- Appointed: 10 January 2026
- Predecessor: Domenico Sorrentino
- Previous post: Archbishop of Benevento (2016–2026)

Orders
- Ordination: 12 July 1986
- Consecration: 15 May 2016 by Mariano Crociata

Personal details
- Born: 2 December 1959 (age 66) Cori, Latina, Lazio
- Denomination: Roman Catholic
- Motto: Nisi dominus ædificaverit

Styles of Felice Accrocca
- Reference style: His Grace; The Most Reverend
- Spoken style: Your Grace
- Religious style: Archbishop

Ordination history of Felice Accrocca
History
Episcopal consecration
- Principal consecrator: Mariano Crociata
- Co-consecrators: Andrea Mugione; Giuseppe Petrocchi

Felice Accrocca (born 2 December 1959) is an Italian prelate of the Catholic Church and Bishop in persona Episcopi of Assisi-Nocera Umbra-Gualdo Tadino and Foligno (since 2026), who was the Archbishop of Benevento (2016–2026).

== Biography ==
Felice Accrocca was born on 2 December 1959 in Cori in the province of Latina, Lazio. He studied at the seminary of the Pontifical College Leoniano in Anagni. He was ordained a priest of the Diocese of Latina-Terracina-Sezze-Priverno on 12 June 1986. Following ordination, he became an associate pastor at the Church of the Assumption of Mary in Cisterna di Latina. In 1989, he became a parish priest at the Church of Saint Luke in Latina, where he remained until 2004. He was then transferred to the Church of Saint Pius X, also in Latina. Finally, he was appointed a parish priest at the Church of the Sacred Heart in Latina in 2012.

He was also the coordinator of the diocese's lay groups, managing editor of the monthly diocese magazine "Chiesa Pontina," and was the episcopal vicar for pastoral affairs.

Accrocca was also a professor of medieval history at the Pontifical Gregorian University in Rome, where he furthered his studies of the medieval Franciscans, publishing numerous books and essays.

=== Episcopal ministry ===
On 18 February 2016, Pope Francis appointed Accrocca Archbishop of Benevento, succeeding Andrea Mugione who retired due to age. On 15 May he was consecrated a bishop by Mariano Crociata, Bishop of Latina-Terracina-Sezze-Priverno and co-consecrators Archbishop Giuseppe Petrocchi and Archbishop Andrea Mugione in the Church of the Sacred Heart where he had been pastor. He was installed on 12 June and received his pallium as metropolitan from Pope Francis on 29 June in St. Peter's Basilica. He chose as his episcopal motto Nisi dominus ædificaverit (Unless the Lord build the house), the opening verse of (Psalm 127).

On 5 December 2020, Pope Francis named him a member of the Congregation for the Causes of Saints.

On 10 January 2026, Pope Leo XIV appointed Accrocca Bishop of Assisi-Nocera Umbra-Gualdo Tadino and Foligno, uniting the two sees in persona Episcopi. Accrocca maintains his ad personam title of Archbishop.

Within the Italian Episcopal Conference he is a member of the commissions for evangelization and for interchurch cooperation.

== Works ==
- Angelo Clareno. Seguire Cristo povero e crocifisso, Messaggero di Sant'Antonio Editrice, 1994.
- Francesco e le sue immagini. Momenti della evoluzione della coscienza storica dei frati Minori (13th to 16th centuries), 1997.
- Francesco. Un folle per amore, Edizioni Paoline, 1998.
- Viveva ad Assisi un uomo di nome Francesco. Un'introduzione alle fonti biografiche di san Francesco, Messaggero di Sant'Antonio Editrice, 2005.
- Francesco fratello e maestro, Messaggero di Sant'Antonio Editrice, 2012.
- Schiavo in Egitto. La storia di Giuseppe, Edizioni Paoline, 2013.
- Francesco, un nome nuovo. Vita di un uomo santo, Messaggero di Sant'Antonio Editrice, 2014.
- Identità complessa. Percorsi francescani fra due e trecento, 2014.
- La leggenda dei tre compagni, Messaggero di Sant'Antonio Editrice, 2014.
- F. Accrocca - L. Bertazzo - P. Maranesi - L. Pellegrini, L'identità in cammino. Povertà e penitenza, predicazione e studi nello sviluppo dei testi legislativi dei frati Minori (13th-16th centuries), edited by A. Czortek, Cittadella editrice, 2014.
- Francesco e la Santa Chiesa Romana. La scelta del Vangelo e la codificazione difficile di un ideale, Cittadella editrice, 2015.

Catholic Church titles
Preceded by Andrea Mugione	Archbishop of Benevento; 2016–present	Incumbent
