= Paolo Rossi de Paoli =

Italian architect (1900–1966)

- Born: 5 January 1900; Bologna, Kingdom of Italy
- Died: 6 August 1966 (aged 66); Rome, Italy
- Occupations: Architect, engineer, urban planner

Paolo Rossi de Paoli (5 January 1900 – 6 August 1966) was an Italian architect, engineer and urban planner.

== Life and career ==
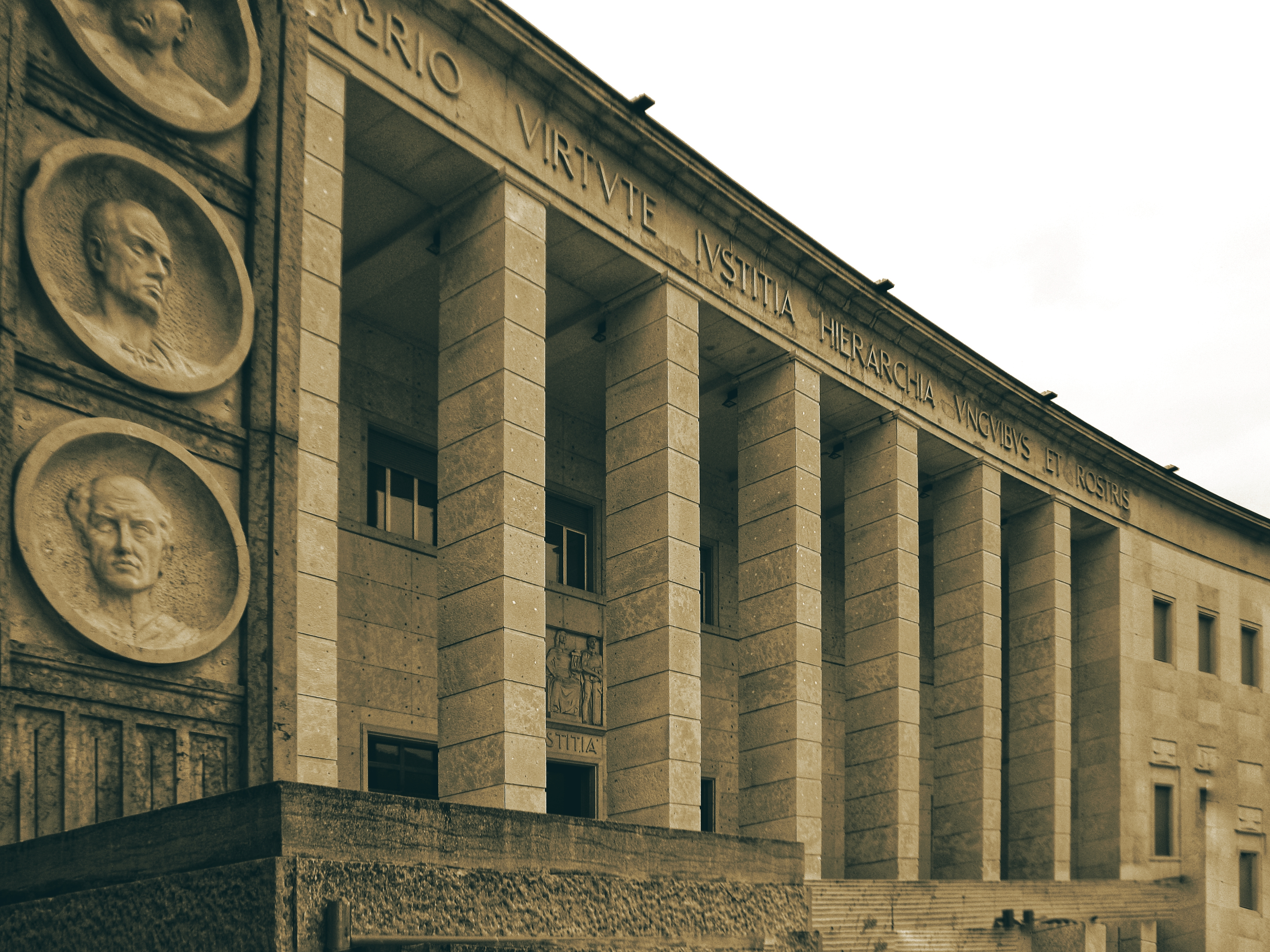
The Bolzano Courthouse

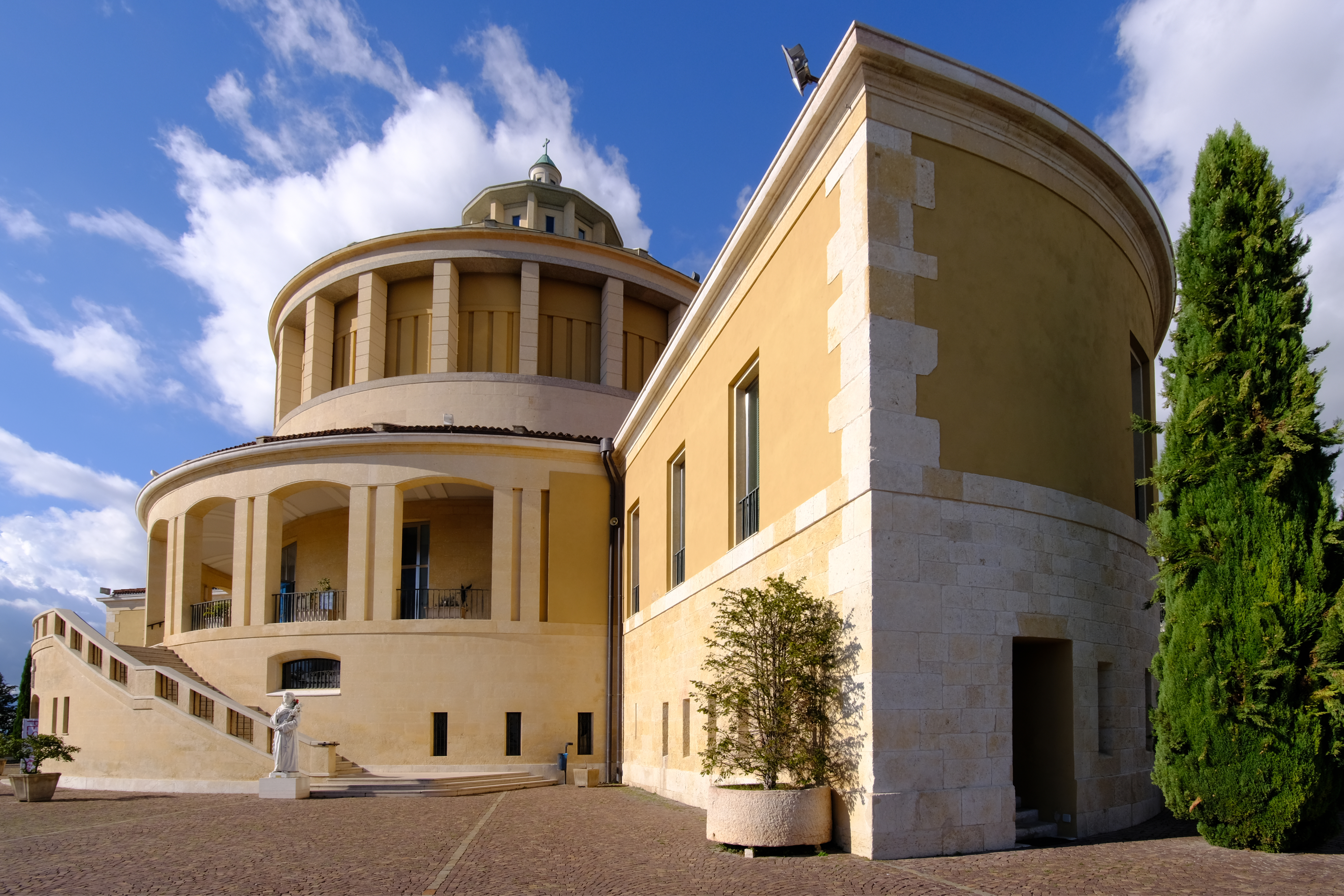
The sanctuary of Our Lady of Lourdes in Verona

The son of politician and jurist Luigi Rossi, he was born in Bologna in 1900. He studied in Rome and Domodossola, earning a degree in architecture in 1921 under the guidance of Marcello Piacentini, with whom he later collaborated. Rossi de Paoli joined the National Fascist Party in 1932 and the professional order of architects the following year, serving as an artillery lieutenant during the Ethiopian War.

For the Ministry of Public Works, he designed several projects such as the Bolzano Courthouse, master plans for cities including Zadar and Verona, and the inter-municipal urban plan for Rome.

Rossi de Paoli worked in various Italian cities, gaining recognition for commissions from the Pontifical Central Commission for Sacred Art, including the church of the Immaculate Heart of Mary and the sanctuary of Our Lady of Lourdes in Verona (1950–52), as well as the reconstruction of the Benevento Cathedral and Archbishop's Palace (1950). In 1950, he oversaw the reconstruction of the parish church of Porto Santo Stefano—destroyed by bombings during the war—together with Mario Paniconi and Giulio Pediconi.

An active member of the National Institute of Urban Planning (INU), Rossi de Paoli held key positions between 1937 and 1966—serving as vice president, treasurer, and president of the Lazio section. He published numerous articles in specialized journals and took part in major exhibitions of architecture and urban planning, including the 7th Milan Triennial and the Italian Urban Planning Exhibition in Vienna (1937), where he also served as director.

== Sources ==
- De Bartolo, Simone (2024). Arcbitettura del Ventennio. Palazzi di Roma.
- Catalani, Barbara; Del Francia, Marco; Tombari, Giovanni (2011). Itinerari di architettura contemporanea. Grosseto e provincia. Pisa: ETS. p. 85.
- Morgante, Michela (2006). Giuseppe Franco Viviani (ed.). Dizionario biografico dei Veronesi (sec. XX). Verona: Cassa di Risparmio di Verona, Vicenza, Belluno e Ancona.
