= Giuseppe Agostino =

- Archbishop of Cosenza-Bisignano
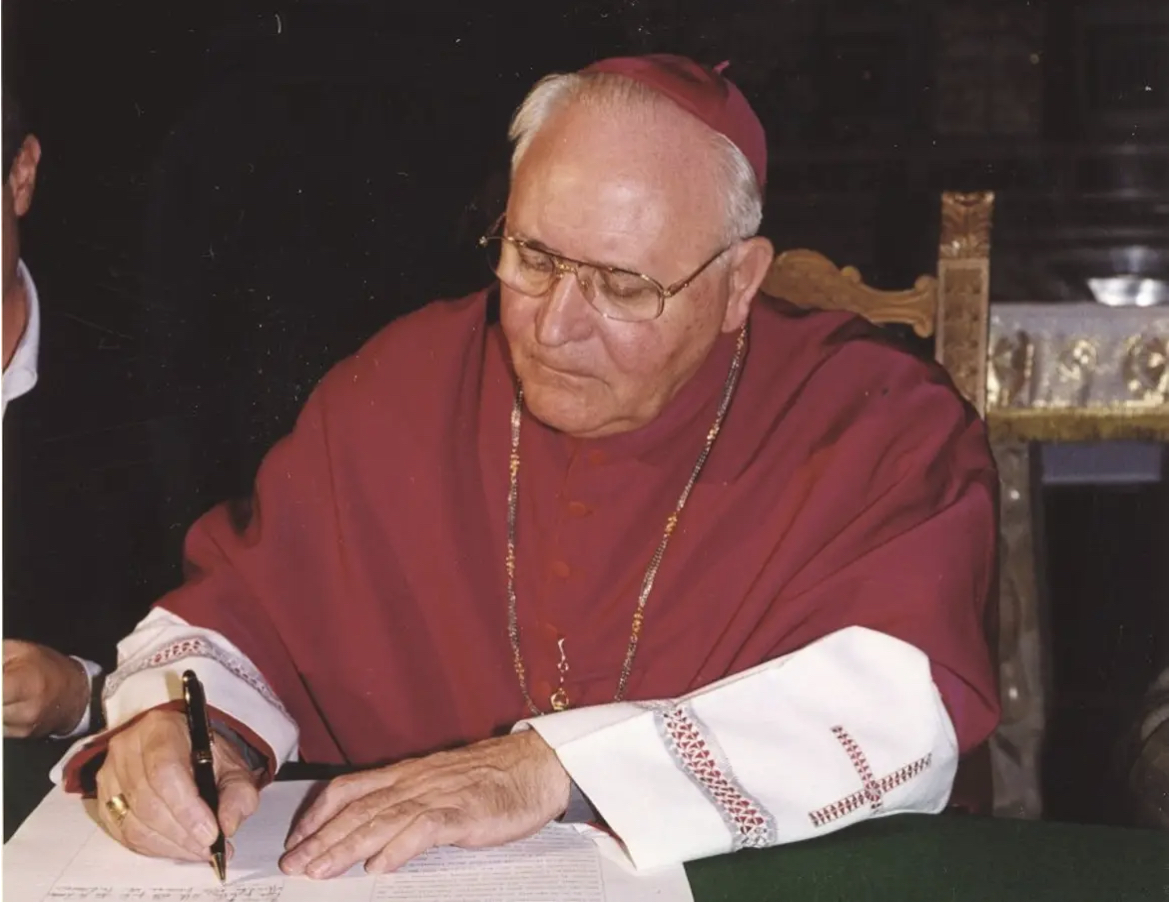
- Church: Catholic Church
- Archdiocese: Archdiocese of Cosenza-Bisignano
- In office: 6 June 1998 – 18 December 2004
- Predecessor: Dino Trabalzini
- Successor: Salvatore Nunnari
- Previous posts: Archbishop of Crotone-Santa Severina (1986-1998); Archbishop of Santa Severina (1973-1986); Bishop of Crotone (1973-1986); Bishop of Cariati (1973-1979)

Orders
- Ordination: 15 July 1951
- Consecration: 11 February 1974 by Giovanni Ferro

Personal details
- Born: 25 November 1928 Reggio Calabria, Province of Reggio Calabria, Kingdom of Italy
- Died: 24 March 2014 (aged 85) Rende, Province of Cosenza, Italy

Giuseppe Agostino (Reggio Calabria, 25 November 1928 – Rende, 24 March 2014) was a Catholic archbishop.

== Biography ==
Ordained to the priesthood, Agostino was named Archbishop of Santa Severina in 1973 and then archbishop of Crotone-San Severina. In 1998, Agostino was named archbishop of Cosenza-Bisignano, Italy, and retired in 2004. He died from natural causes at the age of 85.
