= Benevento Cathedral =

Church building in Benevento, Italy

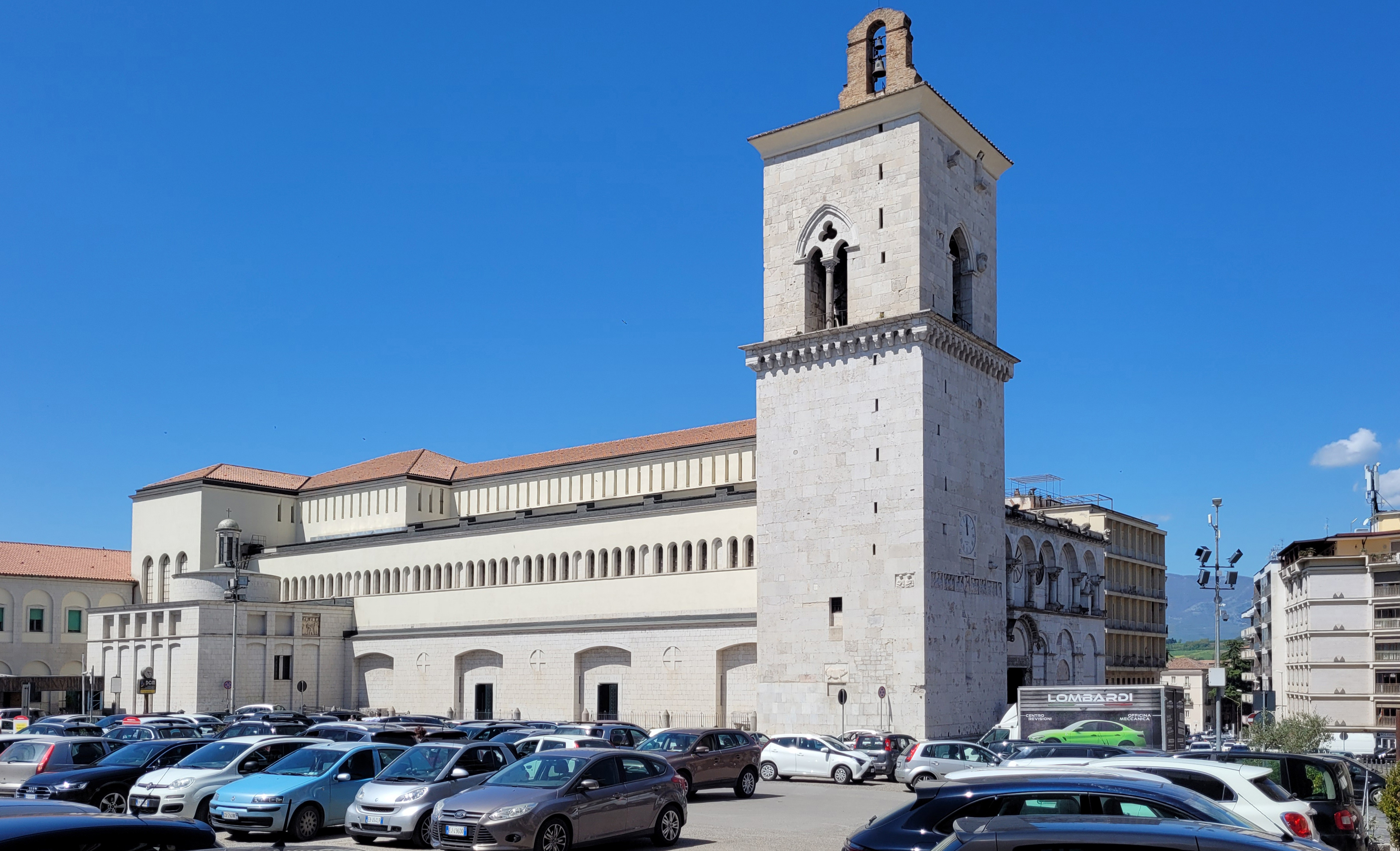
- Benevento Cathedral

Religion
- Affiliation: Roman Catholic Church
- Province: Archdiocese of Benevento
- Ecclesiastical or organisational status: Cathedral
- Status: Active

Location
- Location: Benevento, Italy
- Interactive map of Benevento Cathedral
- Coordinates: 41°7′54.03″N 14°46′28.12″E

Architecture
- Type: Church
- Style: Romanesque
- Groundbreaking: 8th century

Benevento Cathedral (Italian: Duomo di Benevento; Cattedrale metropolitana di Santa Maria de Episcopio) is a church in Benevento, southern Italy. The cathedral is the seat of the Archbishops of Benevento. It dates from the Lombard foundation of the Duchy of Benevento, in the late 8th century, but after its destruction during Allied bombings in the course of World War II, it was largely rebuilt in the 1960s.

== History ==
The cathedral is on the site of the first Christian church in Benevento, where the Roman capitol once stood. In general the foundation is dated to the early 7th century, although in the 8th century under duke Arechis II, it was enlarged into the structure which now forms the crypt of the current cathedral. But as Francesco Lepore demonstrated in a critical study, a sermon of David, bishop of Benevento (781/82 – 796), for the double feast of the Virgin Mary and the dedication of the cathedral on 18 December allows to date the foundation of the church to a few centuries earlier («antiquis temporibus»).
Around 830 the Lombard prince Sico I of Benevento enlarged the primitive church with a nave and two aisles, adding classical columns, which characterized the cathedral until its destruction in 1943.

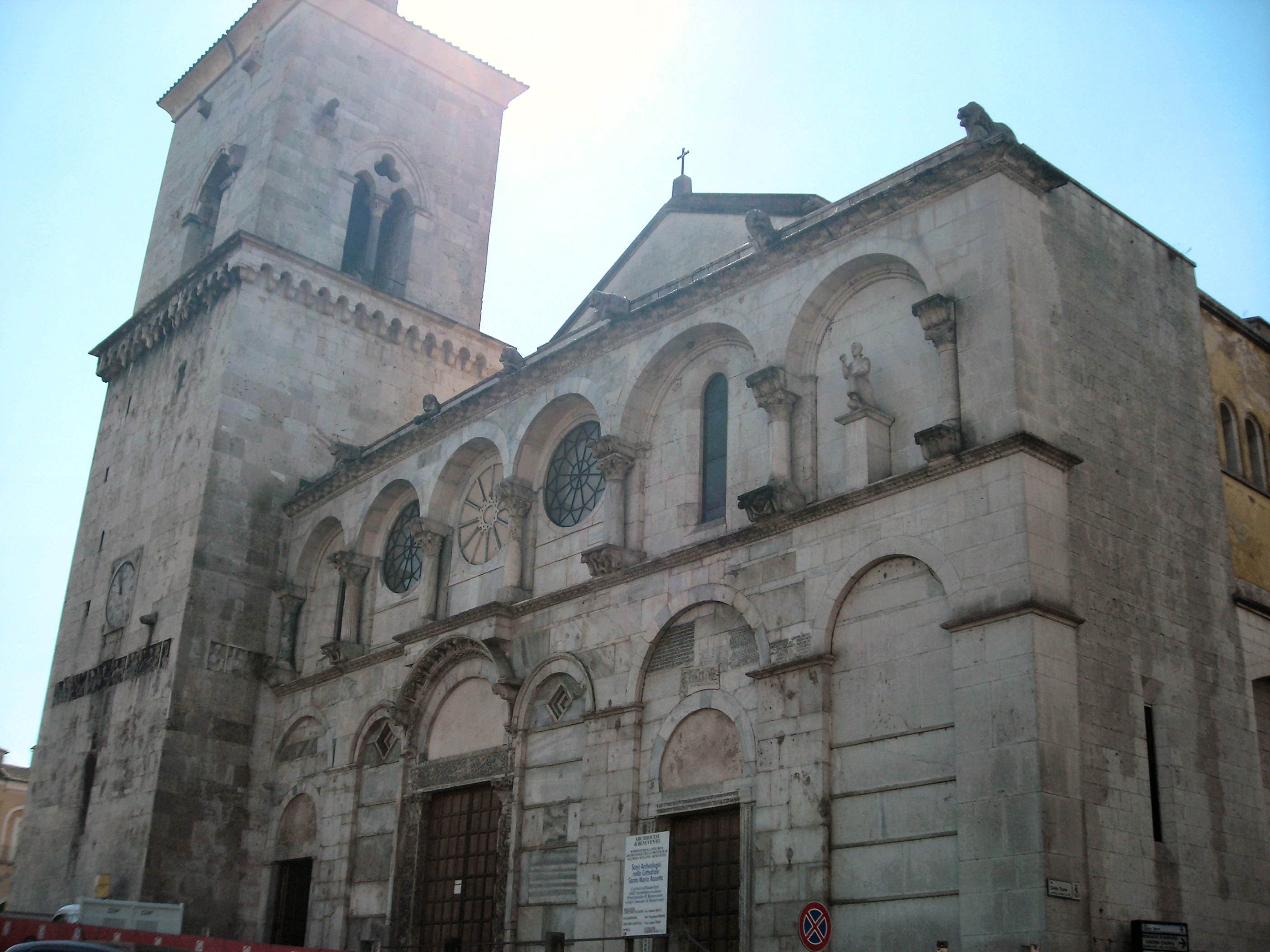
The Romanesque façade

In the 10th century, when Benevento became the seat of an archbishopric, bishop Roffredo enlarged the church, although it lacked a façade and a bell tower until the 13th century. In November 1456 the nearly-completed cathedral was damaged by an earthquake. It was repaired with the help of Pope Pius II and consecrated on 4 November 1473. Perhaps during this restoration it received two further aisles. Other modifications were added before a new reconsecration in 1687. Other earthquakes damaged the church in 1688 and 1702, after which it was brought to the appearance it kept until it was largely destroyed by Allied bombing in World War II.

The church was rebuilt in the 1950s and 1960s to the design of Paolo Rossi de Paoli.

== Description ==
The modern church has maintained the Romanesque façade and bell tower. Also preserved is the crypt of the primitive church, with remains of 14th-century frescoes. All the rest belongs to the modern edifice completed in the 1960s.

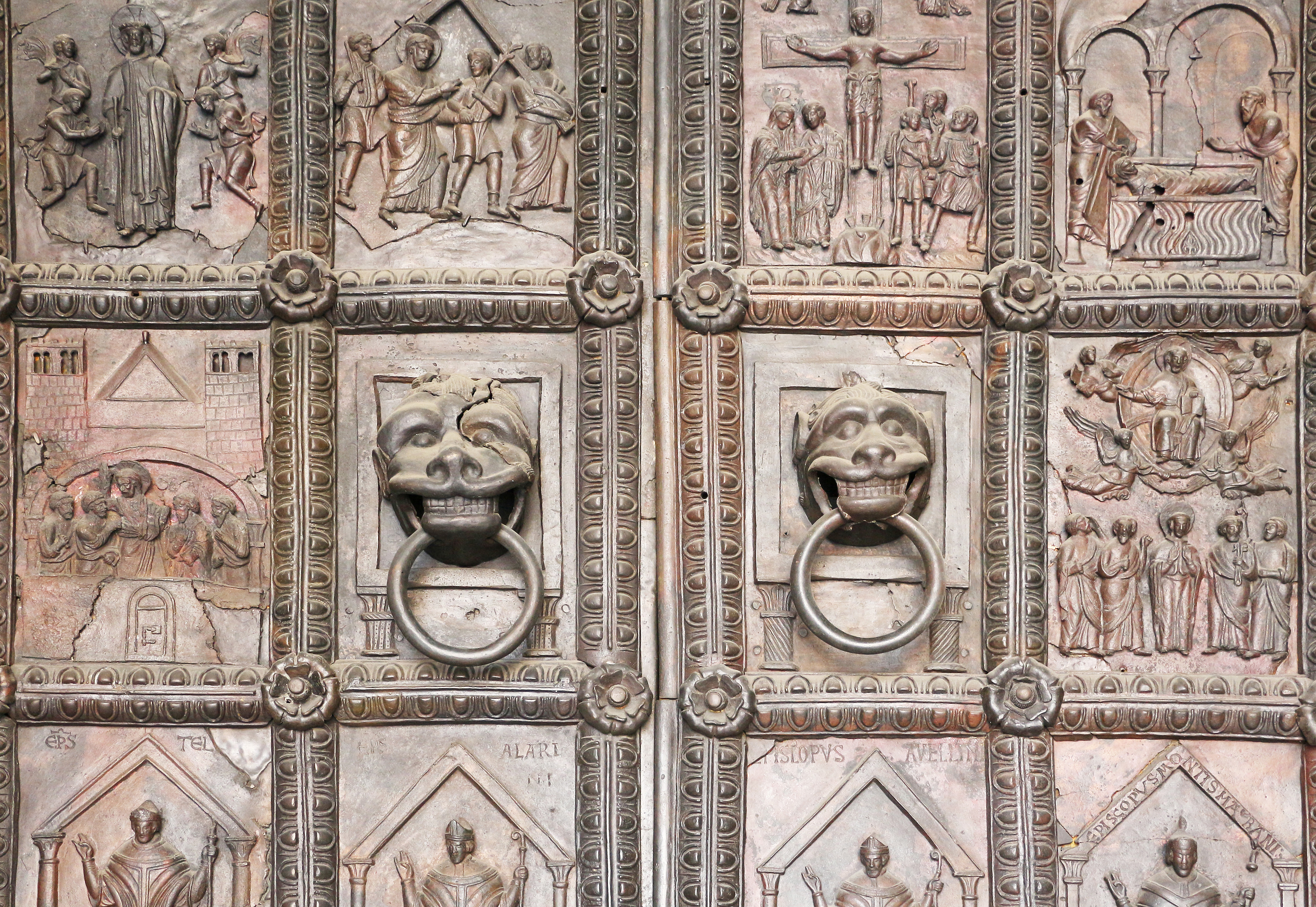
Detail of the main door

The façade, dating to the late 13th century, is entirely in white marble, inspired by contemporary Pisan structures. It has two orders with six arcades, which are shallower on the lower level. The main portal is enclosed by an architrave and two richly decorated imposts. The imposts of the side portals are re-used Roman architraves. The upper arcades form a loggia, and are separated by decorated columns. The arcade above the portal has a rose window with twelve radiating columns and a mosaic of the Mystic Lamb. The other arcades have oculi and a single mullioned window. The one furthest to the right has a depiction of a knight from the 13th century, placed there after the destruction of the original tomb it formerly decorated.

The sturdy square bell tower was erected by archbishop Romano Capodiferro and is dated 11 February 1279. The front has a frieze with 17 Roman gravestones, while the west side features the remains of a Roman labarum in gilt metal. At the base of the east side is a relief representing a wild boar with a crown of laurel: this may hint at the foundation of the city, or might have been the totemic animal of the Samnites living in the area before the Roman conquest. The bell chamber has four double-mullioned windows.

The interior is modern but contains several historical features, including a large statue of Saint Bartholomew (early 14th century), some 18th-century artworks which escaped the destruction of 1943, and the crypt of the 7th–8th-centuries.

== Sources ==
- Rotili, Mario (1952). L'arte nel Sannio. Benevento: E.P.T.
- Abbate, Francesco (1997). Storia dell'arte nell'Italia meridionale. Rome: Donzelli.
