= Minuscule 1216 =

11th-century Greek minuscule manuscript of the New Testament

- New Testament manuscript
- Text: Gospels
- Date: 11th-century
- Script: Greek
- Now at: Saint Catherine's Monastery
- Size: 18.5 cm by 14 cm
- Type: Caesarean text-type
- Category: none
- Note: marginalia

Minuscule 1216 (in the Gregory-Aland numbering), ε1043 (von Soden), is an 11th-century Greek minuscule manuscript of the New Testament on parchment. The manuscript has survived in complete condition.

== Description ==
The codex contains the text of the four Gospels with a commentary on 282 parchment leaves (size 18.5 cm by 14 cm). Some non-biblical material in Latin was added at the end of the codex in 1377.

The text is written in one column per page, 20 lines per page.

The text is divided according to the Ammonian Sections, with references to the Eusebian Canons (written below Ammonian Section numbers).

It contains Epistula ad Carpianum at the beginning, tables of contents (κεφαλαια) before each Gospel, lectionary markings in the margin for liturgical use, pictures, and liturgical books with hagiographies (Synaxarion, Menologion).

== Text ==
Hermann von Soden included it to the textual family I^{βb} (Caesarean group). Kurt Aland did not place the Greek text of the codex in any Category.

According to the Claremont Profile Method it represents the textual family 1216 in Luke 1, Luke 10, and Luke 20, as a core member. The family is related to group 16.

It lacks the text of Matthew 16:2b–3 (Signs of the times).

In Matthew 1:11 it has the additional reading τον Ιωακιμ, Ιωακιμ δε εγεννησεν (Joakim, Joakim begot) — M U Θ Rossano Gospels f^{1} 33 258 478 661 954 1230 1354 1604 Lectionary 54 syr^{h} geo.

In John 4:51 it reads υιος (son) for παις (servant), the reading of the codex is supported by Codex Bezae, Cyprius, Petropolitanus Purpureus, Petropolitanus, Nanianus, 0141, 33, 194, 196, 743, 817, 892, 1192, 1241.

== History ==
C. R. Gregory dated the manuscript to the 10th century. Currently the manuscript is dated by the INTF to the 11th century.

The manuscript was added to the list of New Testament manuscripts by Gregory (1216^{e}). C. R. Gregory saw it in 1886. In 1908 Gregory gave it the siglum 1216.

Currently the manuscript is housed at Saint Catherine's Monastery (Gr. 179), in the Sinai Peninsula.

== See also ==
- List of New Testament minuscules
- Biblical manuscript
- Textual criticism
