= Rossano Gospels =

Uncial 042
- New Testament manuscript
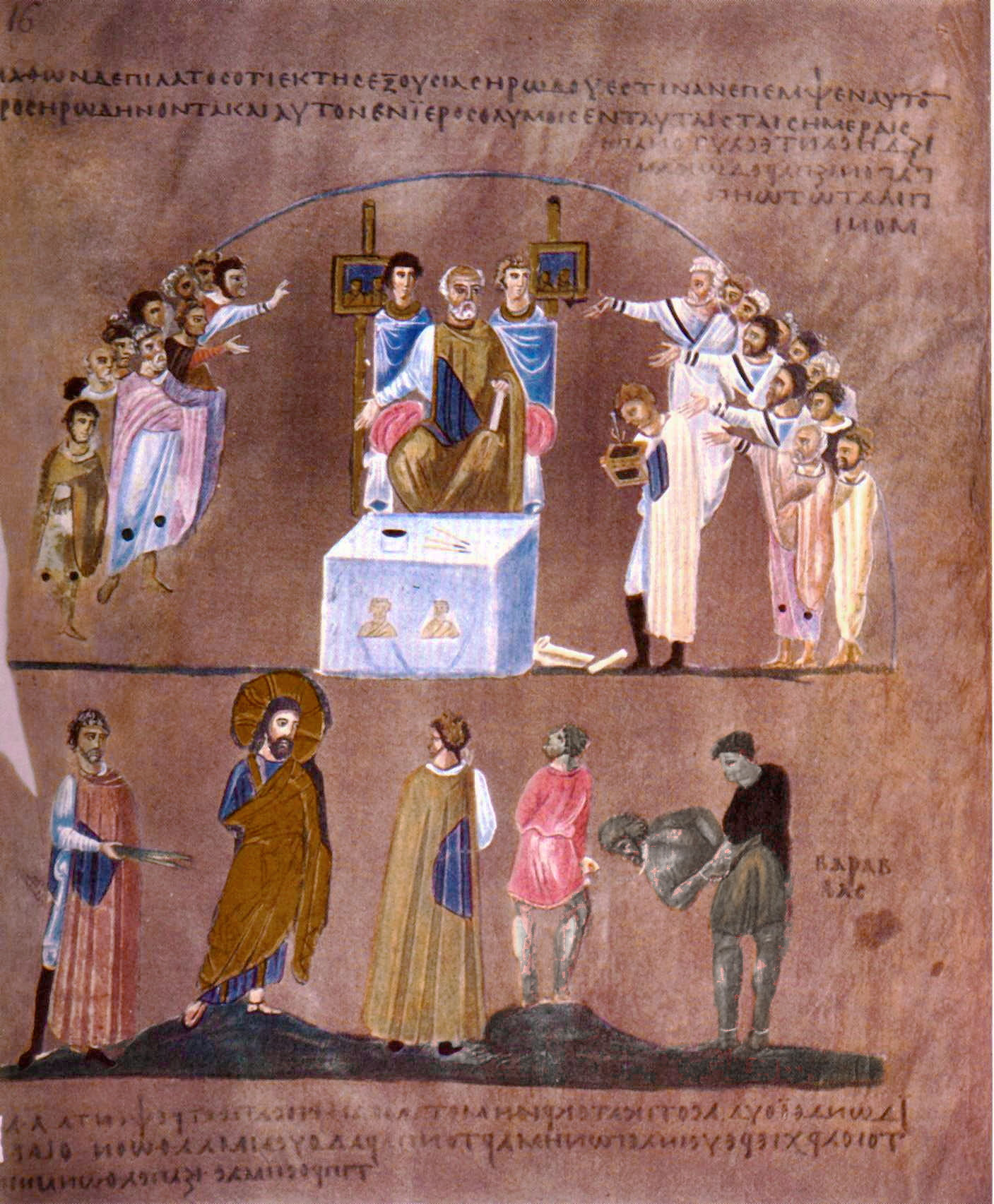
- Christ comes before Pilate
- Name: Purpureus Rossanensis
- Sign: Σ
- Text: Matthew, Mark
- Date: 6th century
- Script: Greek
- Found: 1879, Rossano
- Now at: Diocesan Museum, Rossano Cathedral
- Size: 188 folios; 31 x 26 cm; 20 lines; 2 col.
- Type: Byzantine text-type
- Category: V
- Note: close to N (022)

The Rossano Gospels is an incomplete 6th-century illuminated manuscript Gospel book in Greek written following the reconquest of the Italian Peninsula by the Byzantine Empire. It is also known as Codex purpureus Rossanensis due to the reddish-purple (purpureus in Latin) appearance of its pages. It is designated by the siglum 042 or Σ in the Gregory-Aland numbering of New Testament manuscripts, and as ε 18 in the von Soden numbering of New Testament manuscripts.

It is one of the oldest surviving illuminated manuscripts of the New Testament, possibly the oldest, and famous for its prefatory cycle of miniatures of subjects from the Life of Christ, arranged in two tiers on the page, sometimes with small Old Testament prophet portraits below, prefiguring and pointing up to events described in the New Testament scene above. It is now in Rossano Cathedral, Calabria, Italy, where it was discovered in the 19th century.

== Description ==
=== Contents ===
The manuscript is a codex (precursor to the modern book format), containing the text of the Gospel of Matthew and the majority of the Gospel of Mark with only one missing portion, Mark 16:14-20. It is thought that there was a companion second volume, which is apparently lost. It contains the Epistle to Carpian, the table of contents (known as κεφάλαια / kephalai) before each Gospel, their titles (known as τίτλοι / titloi) written at the top of the pages, along with the numbers of the Ammonian Sections, and references to the Eusebian Canons (both early divisions of the Gospel texts into sections).

Nearly all of its miniatures are presented in an architecture-like setting, and it uses bright colors on purple vellum with gold and silver lettering, and brightly-painted illustrations. Due to the lavish materials and high quality of the illumination, Byzantine art historians, such as Kathleen Maxwell, have posited that it was created in an imperial scriptorium in Constantinople.

In the sixth century, gospel books had two main types of presentation, Biblical order and liturgical order. Liturgical order means that the readings were arranged according to the church calendar, which begins at Advent and ends with Pentecost. The illustrations of the Rossano Gospels are separate from the text of the Gospels and are arranged according to the liturgical calendar during the season of Lent.

The manuscript presents its text in a liturgical order like other manuscripts. Chapters in this manuscript are arranged according to the church year. In this particular case, the readings followed the Lenten seasonal order, telling the story of Jesus' last few weeks on earth and the circumstances around his death.

There are 14 illuminations in the manuscript, 12 of which are from the life of Jesus, with the final two being a portrait of Mark the Evangelist, and one is for the title page of canon/kephalaia lists. The illuminations are drawn on parchment that isn't as thick as that used for the Gospel text, with the thinner pages believed to be better suited to keep the colours from impressing on the opposite page made of thicker parchment.

=== Materials ===
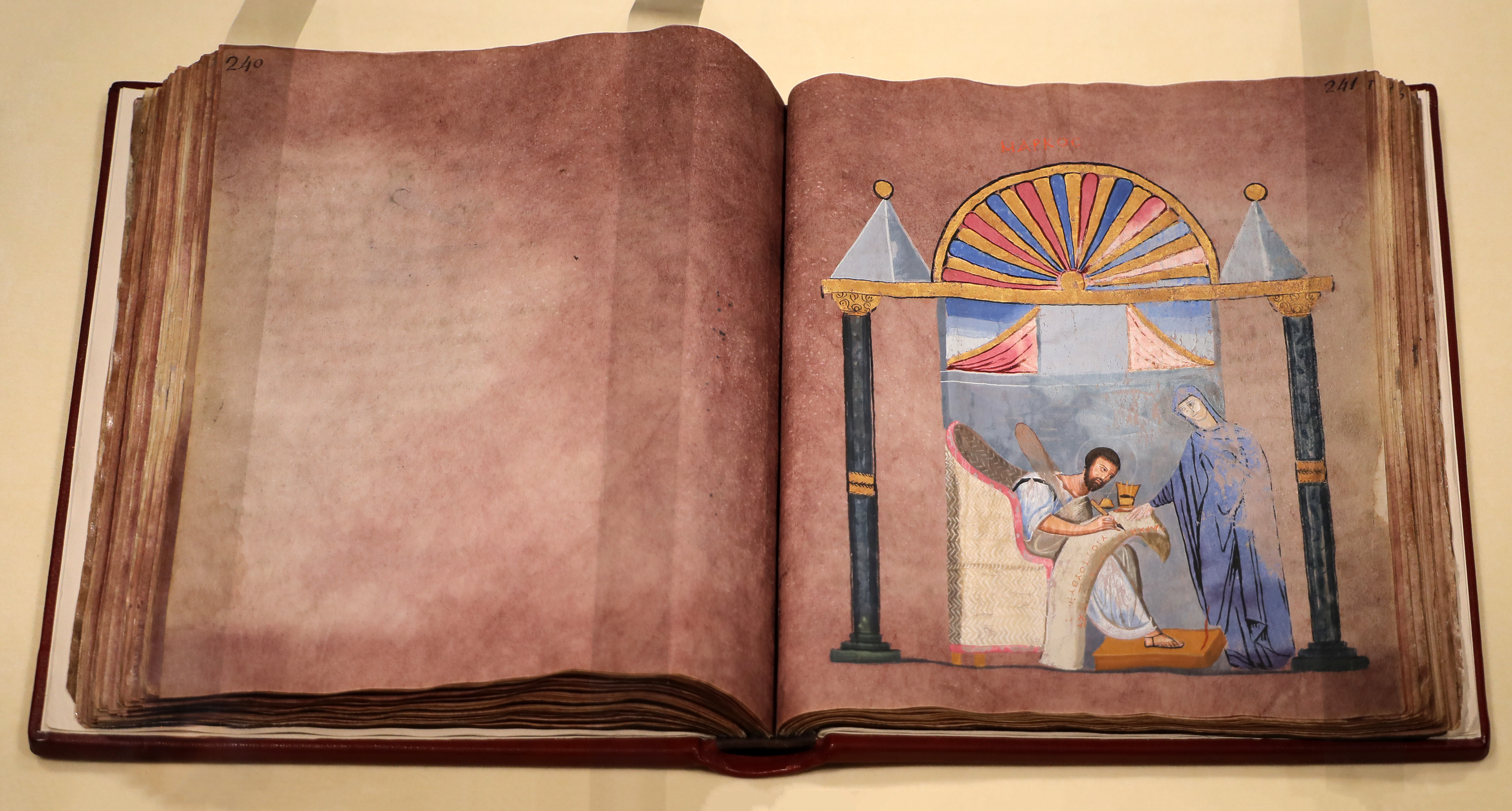
Purpureus Rossanensis

The manuscript is one of the oldest illuminated manuscript to be penned in silver ink on parchment which has been dyed purple, with colors chosen from dark purple to reddish brown.

The text is written on 188 folios (376 pages) of parchment made from calf skin, with the thinner parchment showing its higher value. The manuscript is quite large in size, with a height of 300 mm and width of 250 mm, and the text is written in a 215 mm square block with two columns of twenty lines each.

The Vienna Genesis and the Sinope Gospels are also written in silver ink on purple-dyed parchment. In the Middle Ages, purple was believed to be a symbol of royalty or holiness, and because Christianity considered Jesus Christ to be the embodiment of God, he is worthy of the rare purple dye.

=== Decoration ===
In the Christ before Pilate illumination, the trial of Christ before Pilate is shown, where Pontius Pilate is sitting on a chair surrounded by people. There is a halo-like shape drawn over the whole scene, and the people are arranged in a semi-circle. Below that, separated by a ground line, are Jesus and several other figures that are supposed to be standing in front of Pilate. If someone were to draw a line around the whole image, it would form the shape of an arch. A model of an apse shows how easily the miniature could fit into the shape, and how likely it was that it is a direct copy of the apse of some structure. In many of the images, the eyes of the crowd figures are not quite focused on the subject on the drawing, suggesting that they held another position when they were first drawn.

Christ stands in a subordinate position, lower and to one side. Pilate's commanding position distinguishes these miniatures from almost all other versions of the trial in early Christian and medieval art. Another distinctive mark of these miniatures is the moment selected for the representation. In the first scene, this is the beginning of the trial when Christ is led to Pilate by the high priests, one of whom supports the charges. The second scene represents the choice between Christ and Barabbas offered by Pilate to the Jews. These two scenes show that the formal opening of the trial and the central moment of it when the critical issue was posed. Almost all other representations are content to present the famous hand-washing scene, the last act of the trial, in which Pilate disclaimed responsibility for the decision taken. In the Rossano Gospel's Trial of Christ, there are three acts and three interludes. The inscription on the rector at the top (Matt 27:2) announced the opening of trial in which Christ's silence and refusal to answer charges is the focal point, interpolated with the fate of Judas (27:3-5). The second event of the trial, the choice between Christ and Barabbas (Luke 23:18 or Matt 27:21), has an interluding scene featuring Herod (Luke 23:6-12). The third act of trial is the Washing of Pilate's Hands (Matt 27:23-25) with the interlude of the Message of Pilate's Wife (Matt.27:19).

In the illustration of Saint Mark writing the Gospels, there are two figures; Saint Mark is seated in a throne-like chair with his muse, Mary, as Divine wisdom. There is definitely a sense of space within. The robes of the two figures are also lined with complexity with many strokes of the pen showing the folds of cloth. Thus, it is surprising that the surrounding architecture, which consists of two columns and what appears to be an apse or other such archway, is devoid of all but the simplest details. Even the top of the arch with its seashell-like pattern is rigid and sharp, which further proves the theory that the miniatures on the pages of this Gospels were derived from existing structures.

Other significant images include Jesus giving the last supper to his disciples and of Jesus washing Peter's feet. Jesus and the disciple on the right end of the table are reclining; they are twisted in a way that is not proportional according to the strange dual perspective. The floor actually seems to be part of the table at first glance, as there is no distinction between where the table ends and the floor begins. The floor, too, is miraculously upended, and upon it are drawings of pheasants or peacocks. The disciples that gather around the semi-circular table form an arch. Perhaps an original of this piece was once situated in such a way. Eyes of the disciples are slightly unfocused as they look at Jesus, suggesting that their forms may have been situated along the structure of an apse's shell-like shape.

== Text ==
The text of the manuscript is considered to be a representative of the Byzantine text-type, in close relationship to Codex Petropolitanus Purpureus (N). The Rossano Gospels, along with the manuscripts N, O, and Φ, belong to the group of the Purple Uncials (or purple codices). Biblical scholar Kurt Aland placed all four manuscripts of the group (the Purple Uncials) in Category V of his New Testament manuscript classification system. Category V manuscripts are described as having "a purely or predominantly Byzantine text."

Some notable readings

Matthew 1:11

τον Ιωακιμ, Ιωακιμ δε εγεννησεν (Joakim, Joakim fathered) — Σ M U Θ f^{1} 33 258 478 661 954 1216 1230 1354 1604 Lectionary 54 sy^{h} geo
omit. - Majority of manuscripts.

Matthew 23:25

ακαθαρσιας (uncleanliness) - Σ latt sy^{s} co
ακρασιας (self-indulgence) - Majority of manuscripts.

== History ==
=== Origin ===
The early history of the manuscript is unknown. Several theories have been provided, with a suggestion that it came in the 7th century CE, along with Basilian monks, from either Constantinople, Egypt, or from after the Islamic conquest of north Africa. Another theory claims that it arrived when Rossano became a Diocese in the X century, marking the moment of highest splendor for the city.

It was discovered in 1846 in Rossano Cathedral, the Rossano Gospels is the oldest extant illuminated manuscript of the New Testament Gospels. The Gospels were written after the Ostrogoths of the Byzantine Empire recaptured the Italian Peninsula after the war (from 535 to 553).

=== Rediscovery ===
The manuscript was rediscovered in 1879 in the sacristy of Rossano Cathedral by Oskar von Gebhardt and Adolf Harnack. On 9 October 2015 in Abu Dhabi, UNESCO inscribed the Codex Purpureus Rossanensis in its Memory of the World international register.

Although it is no longer used in Christian ceremonies, this particular type of Gospel codex is important for dissecting art and symbolism, and research on the pages has shed light on early Christian beliefs. The manuscript has been dated by the Institute for New Testament Textual Research (INTF) to the 6th century.

== See also ==
- Early Christian art and architecture
- List of New Testament uncials
- Christ before Pilate
- Evangelist Mark

== Gallery ==
Sequence as in the book (with omissions). The hues of the sheets differ significantly. Most images were taken (in 2005) before the restoration in 2012.

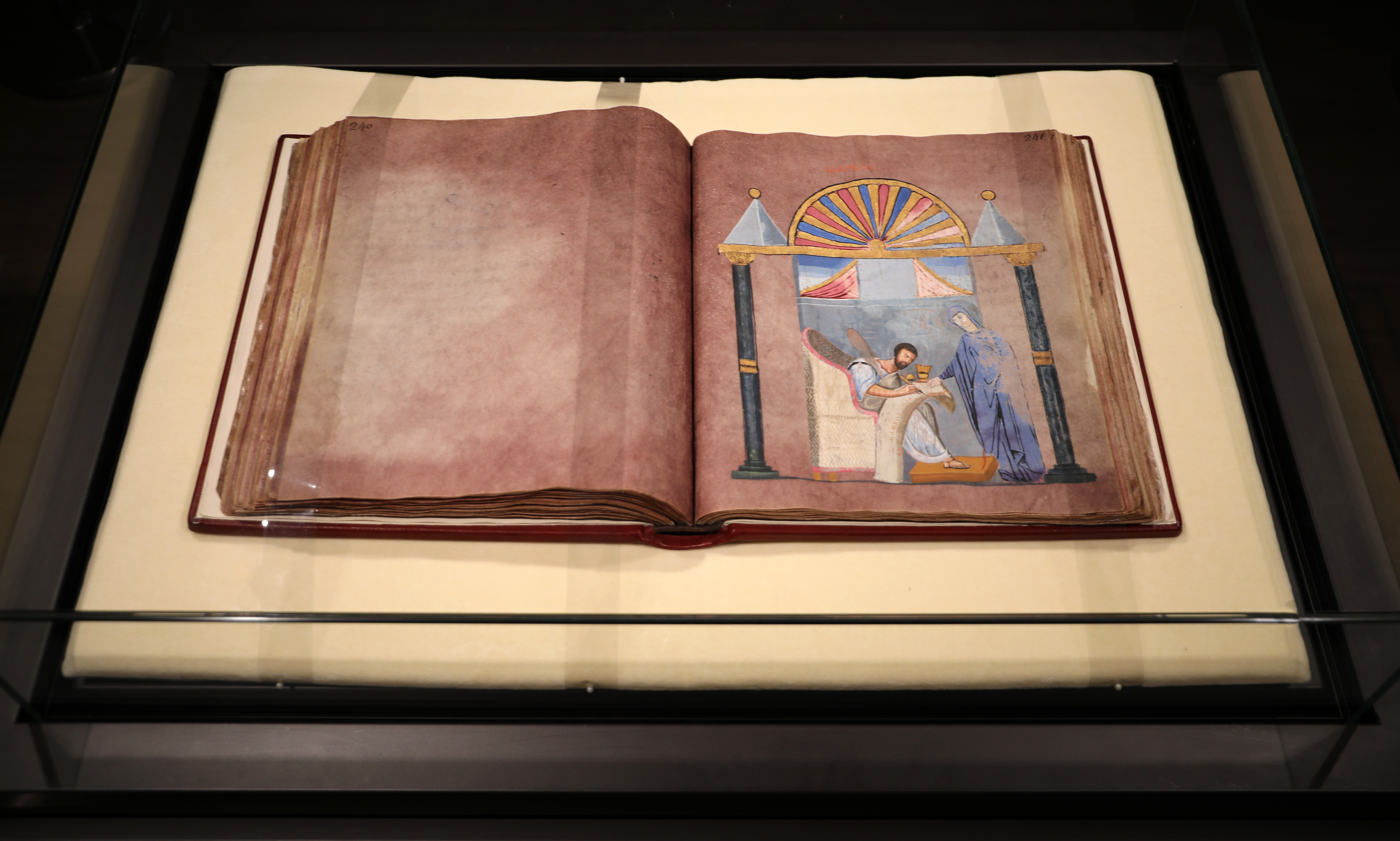
Presentation at the Diocesan Museum in Corigliano-Rossano

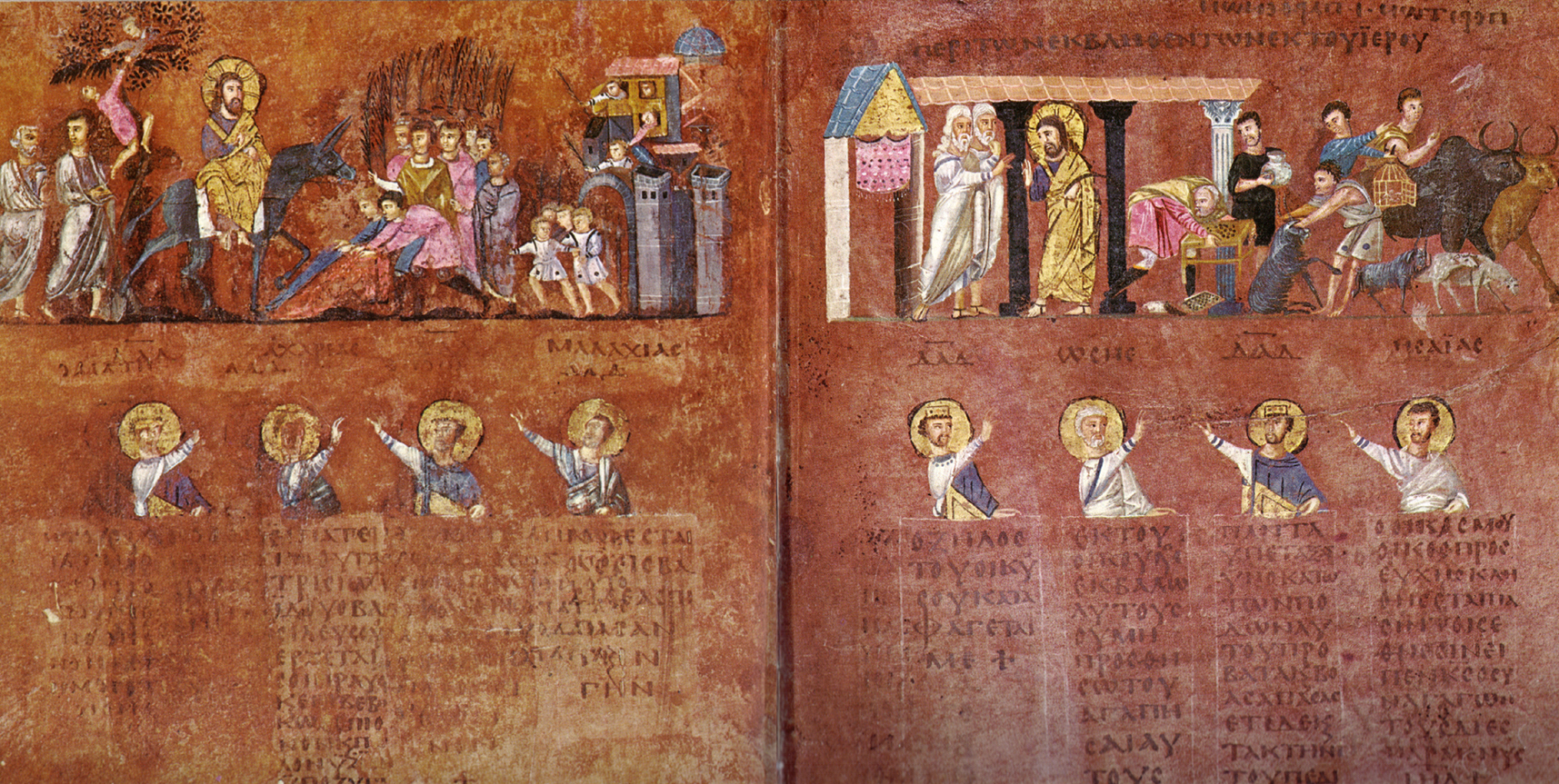
Entry into Jerusalem, and Cleansing of the Temple

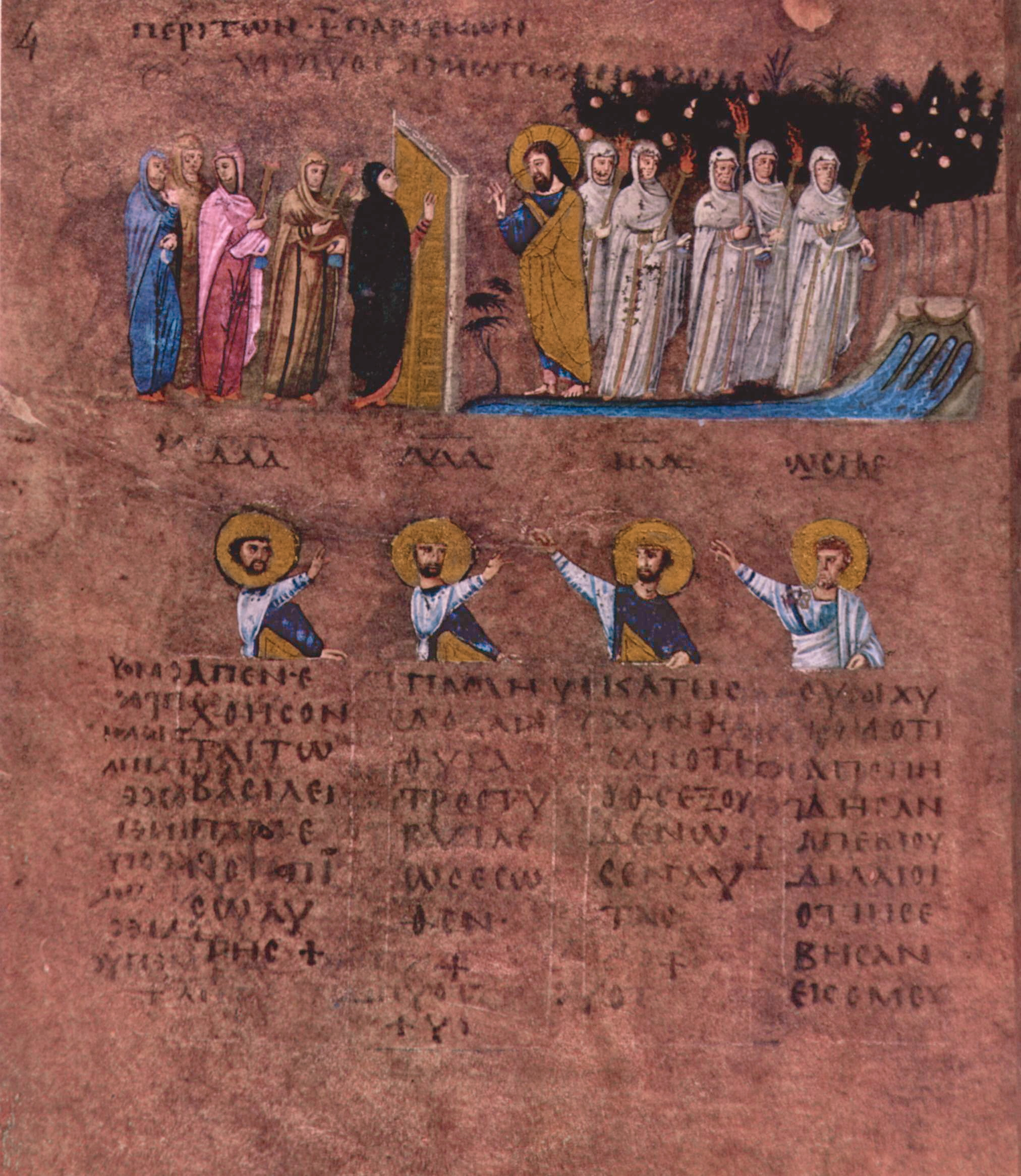
Parable of the Ten Virgins

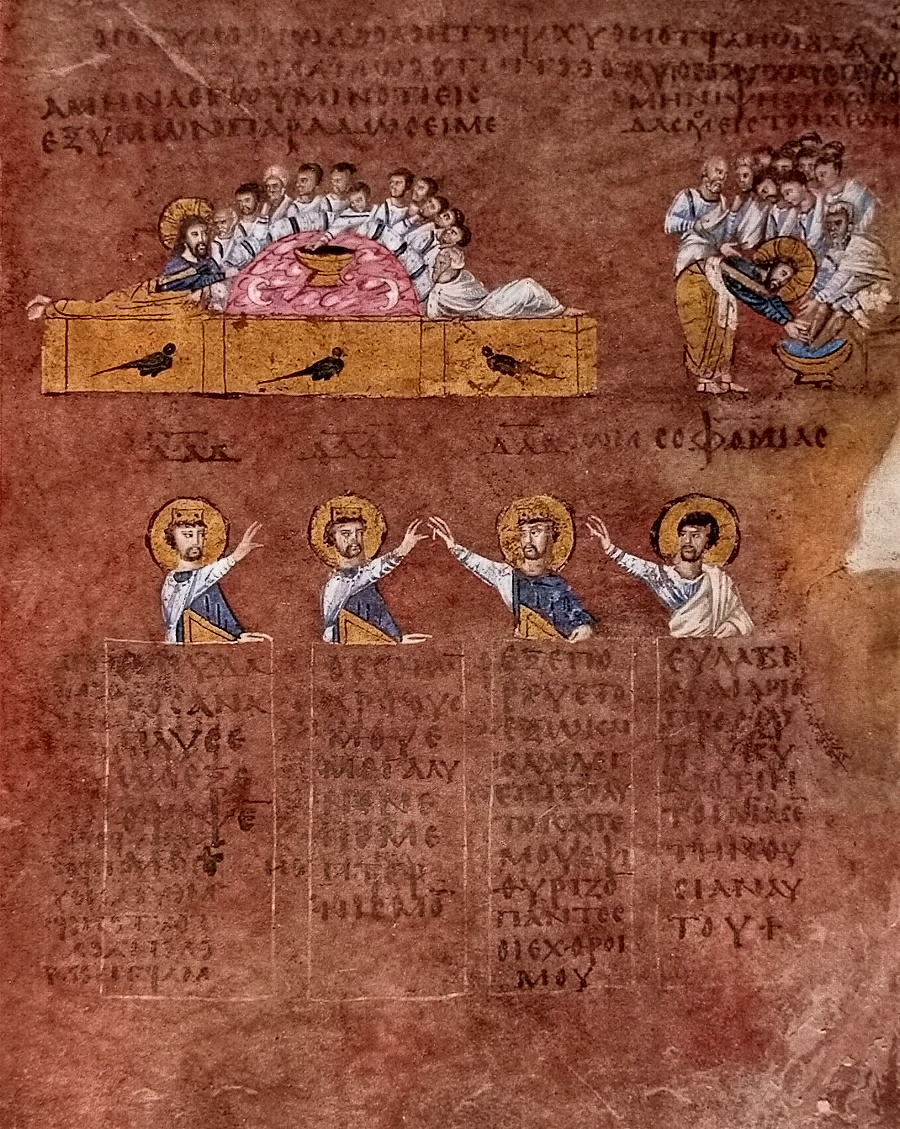
The Last Supper and Washing of the Feet

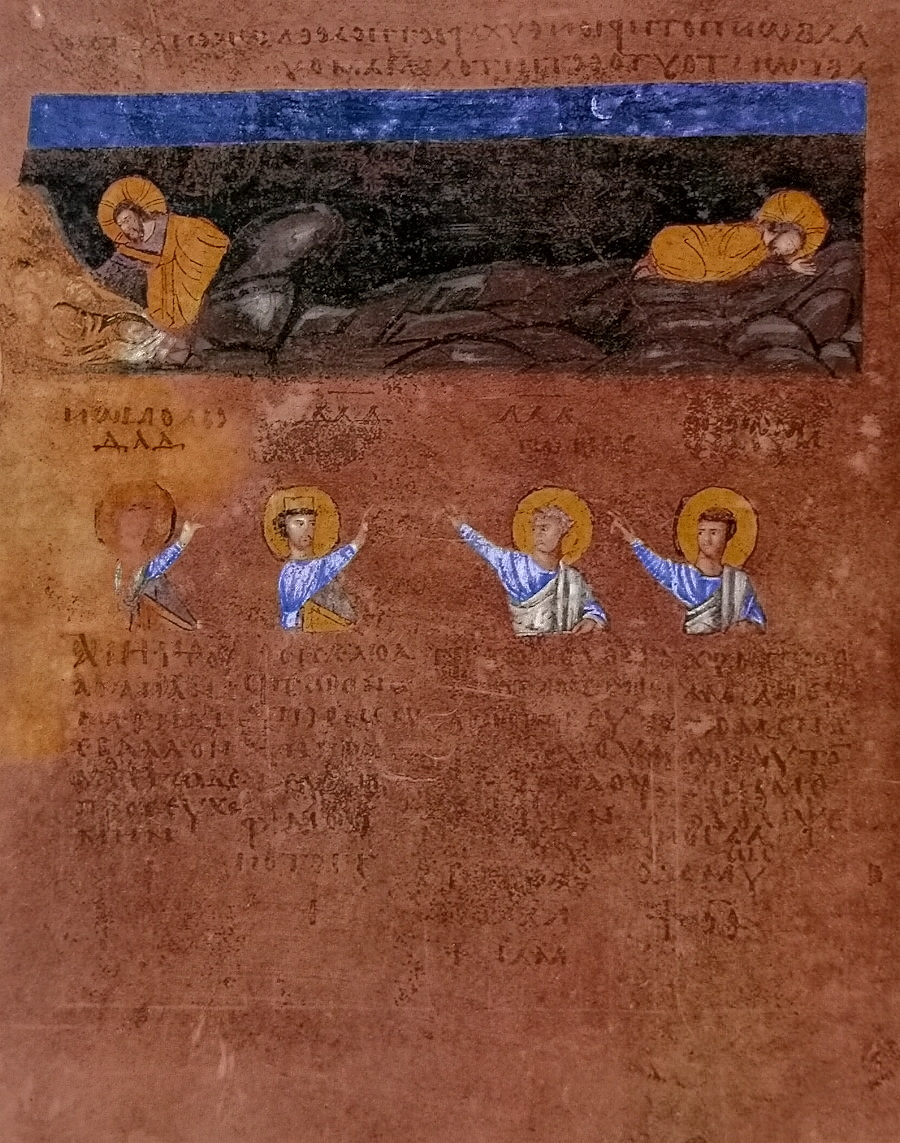
Agony in the Garden

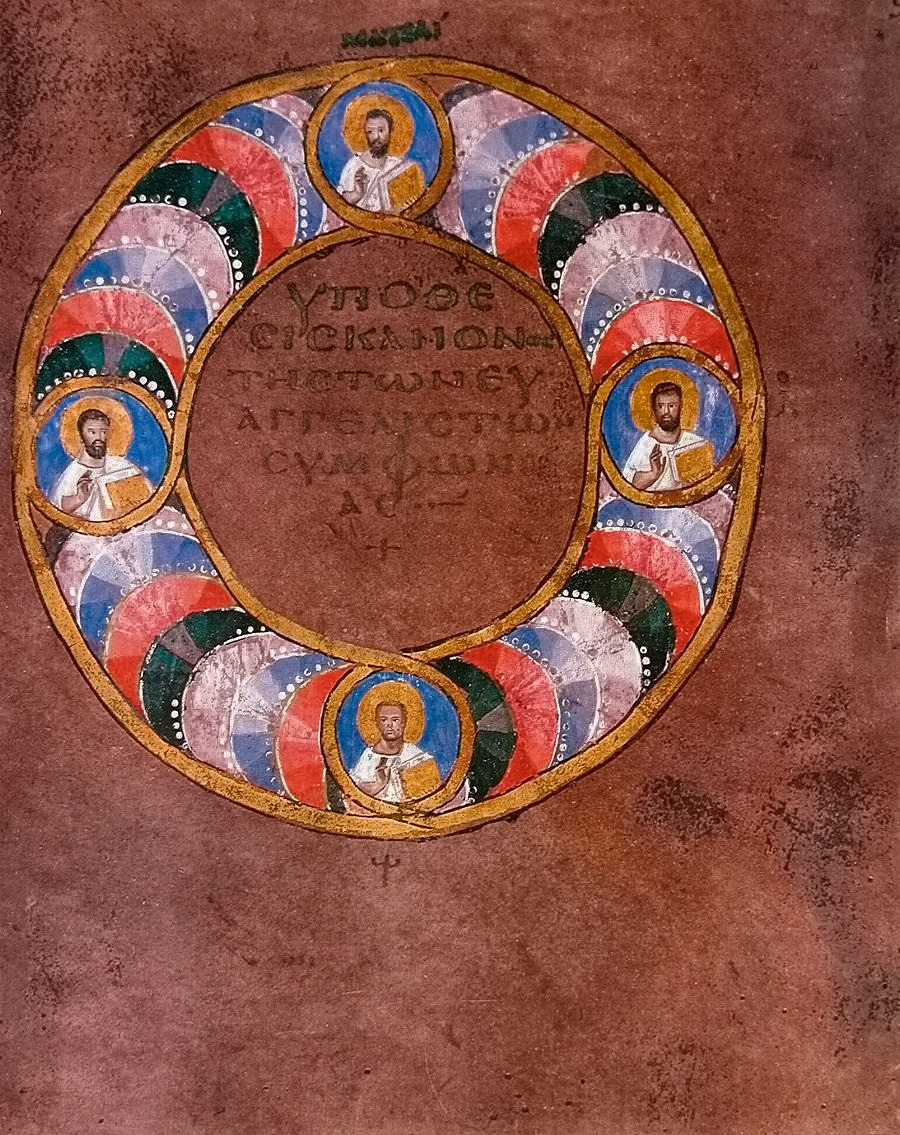
The Four Evangelists

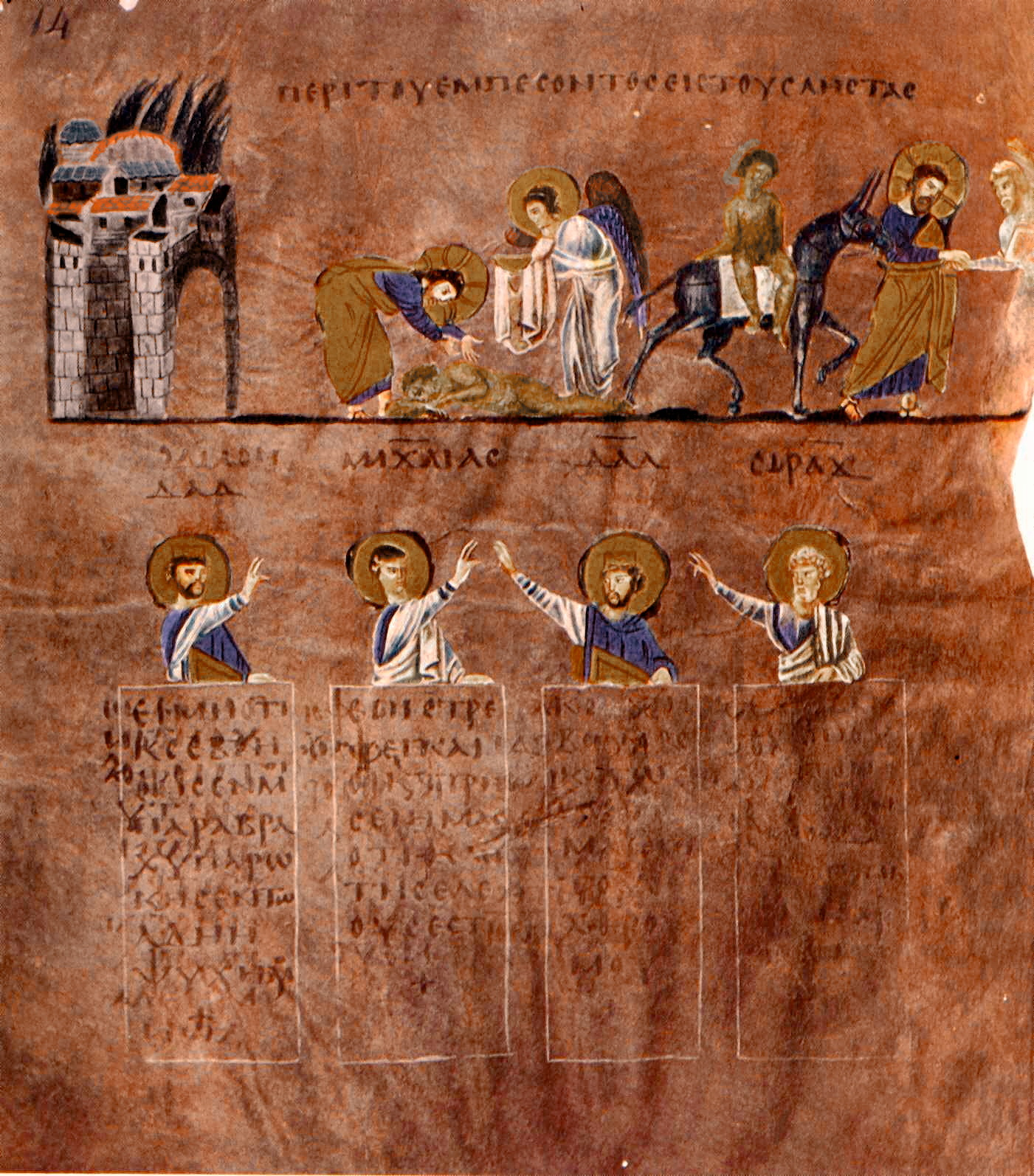
Good Samaritan

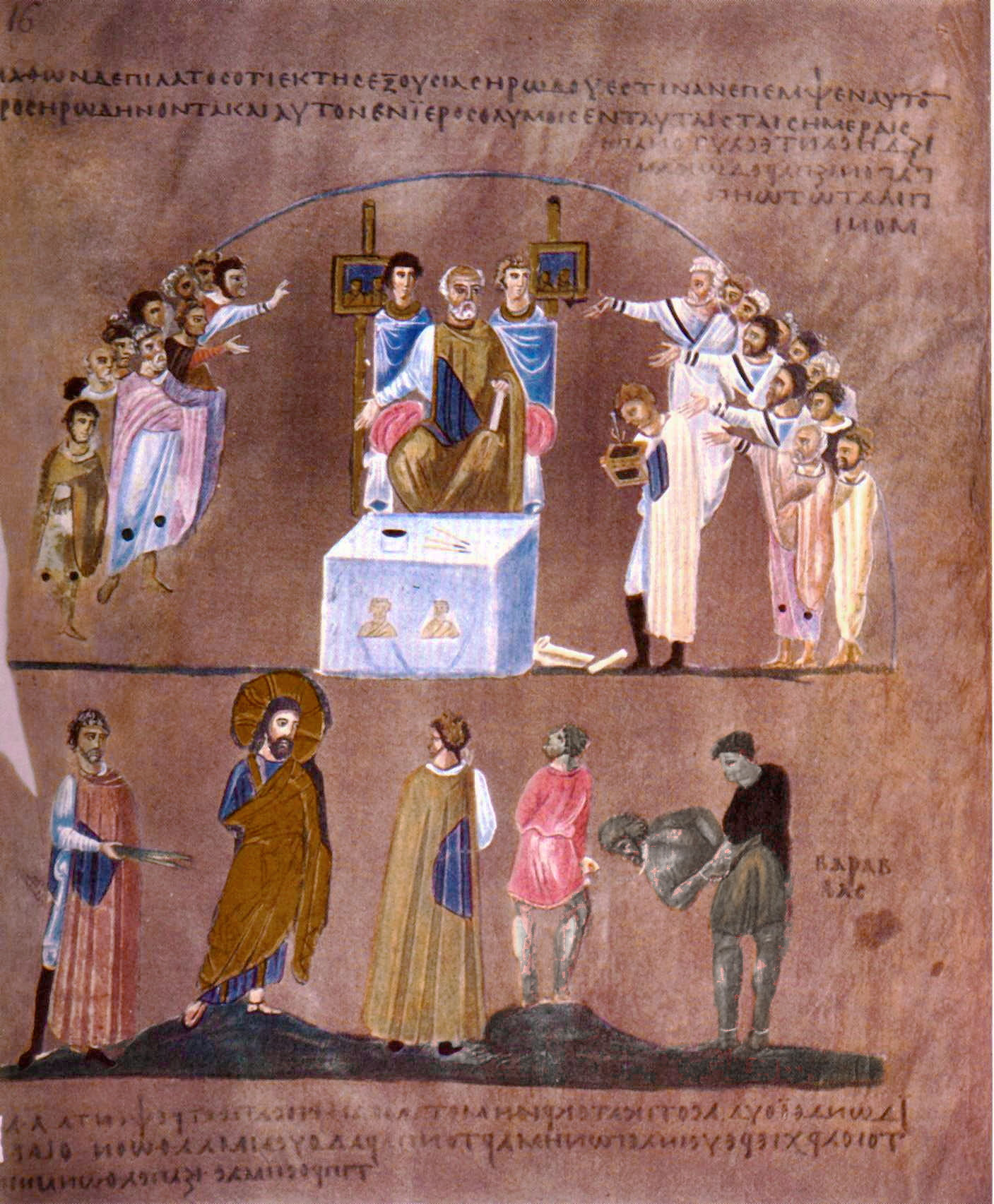
Christ Before Pilate

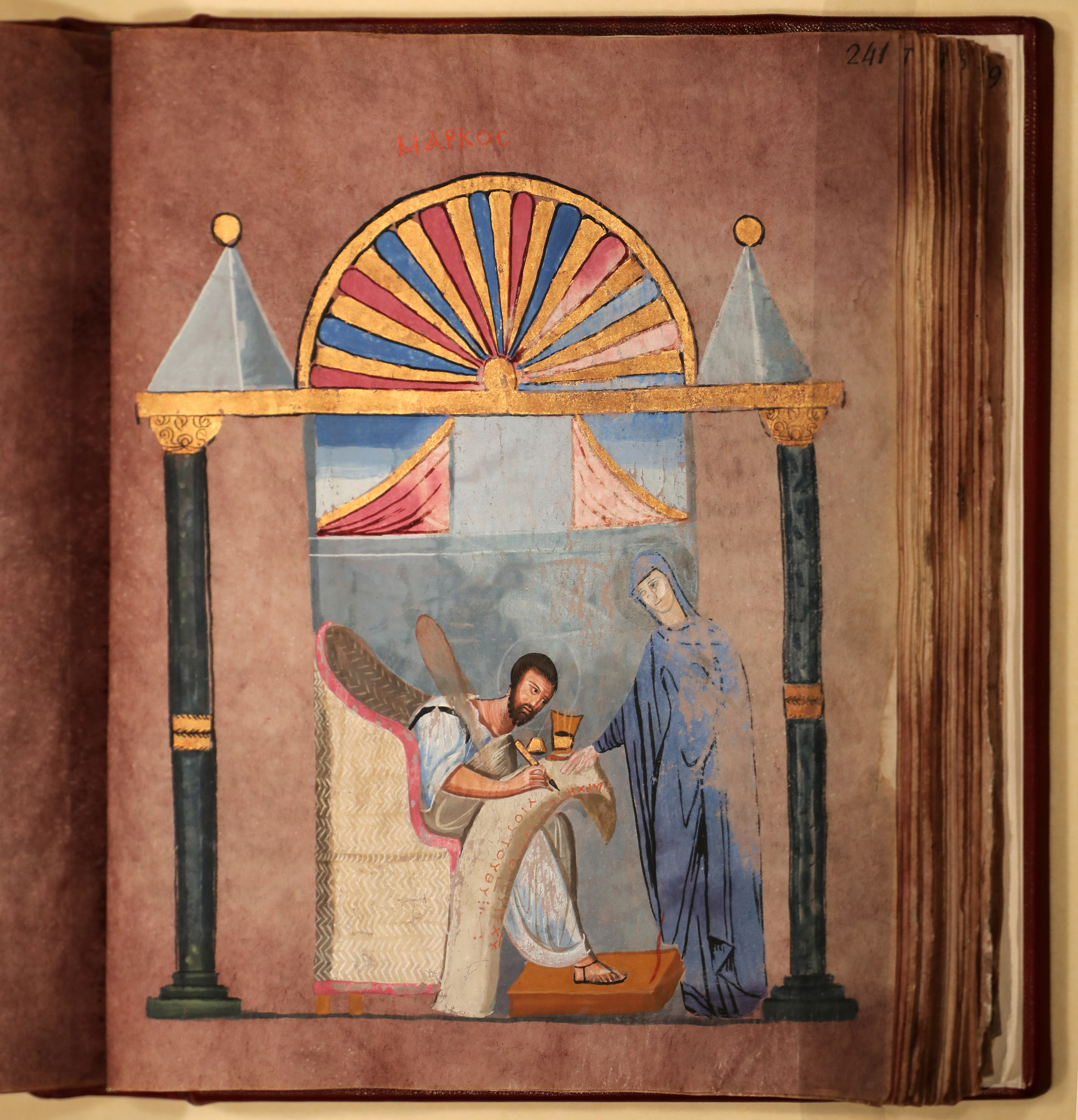
Evangelist Mark
