= Matthew 1:11 =

- ← 1:10 1:12 →
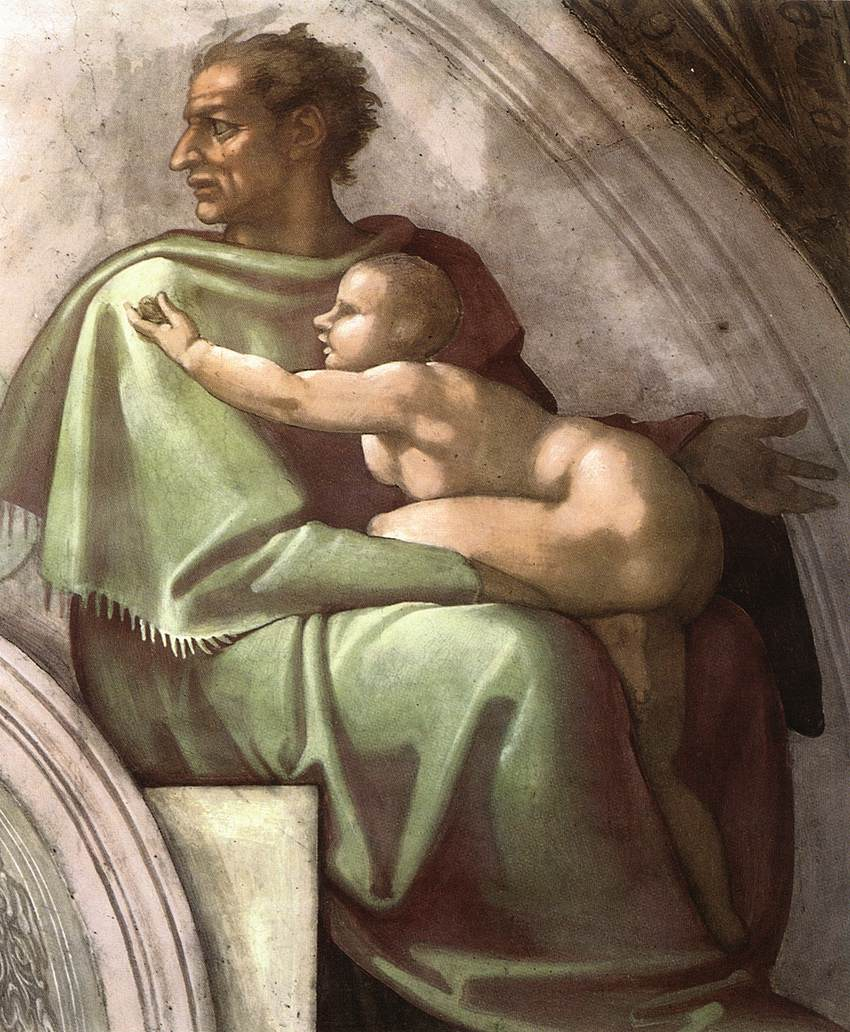
- Michelangelo's Josiah-Jechoniah-Sheatiel. Josiah is with Jechoniah being the child on his knee.
- Book: Gospel of Matthew
- Christian Bible part: New Testament

Matthew 1:11 is the eleventh verse of the first chapter of the Gospel of Matthew in the New Testament. The verse is part of the section where the genealogy of Joseph, the father of Jesus, is listed. It is the last verse of the middle third of the listing.

== Content ==
In the King James Version of the Bible the text reads:

And Josias begat Jechonias and
his brethren, about the time
they were carried away to Babylon:

The World English Bible translates the passage as:

Josiah became the father of
Jechoniah and his brothers, at
the time of the exile to Babylon.

== Textual variants ==
Some manuscripts have additional reading in this verse — τον Ιωακιμ, Ιωακιμ δε εγεννησεν (Joakim, Joakim begot) — M U Θ Σ f^{1} 33 258 478 661 954 1216 1230 1354 1604 ℓ54 syr^{h} geo.

== Analysis ==
This portion is part of the listing of the Kings of Judah and covers the period from the mid-7th century BC to the beginning of the Babylonian captivity. Josiah was a prominent monarch who reigned from 641 BC or 640 BC until 609 BC. Jeconiah came two monarchs later and is best known for being defeated and brought with his people in captivity in Babylon around 598 BC.

The main question about this passage is what it means by the word brothers. According to the Books of Chronicles, Jeconiah only had one brother, so the plural does not make sense. A common view is to see Jeconiah's name in this section as an error. Jeconiah, who is already listed in Matthew 1:12, sometimes has his name written as Jehoiachin making it possible that the author of Matthew or a later scribe confused him with his father Jehoiakim. In Irenaeus' Latin version of this text Jehoiakim's name appears, but this is the only piece of textual evidence for this theory. All other ancient versions leave him out. Also in Irenaeus, the brothers are still associated with Jeconiah. This theory would also address a number of other problems. Josiah is believed to be Jeconiah's grandfather rather than father, and having the listing of Jeconiah as two separate people would correct the seeming error in Matthew 1:17. Jehoiakim had a number of brothers and these are mentioned in 1 Chronicles 3:15. William F. Albright and C.S. Mann believe the author of Matthew mentioned the brothers, despite their having nothing to do with Jesus' genealogy, because they are prominently mentioned in Chronicles.

Robert H. Gundry disagrees with this view. The Septuagint, from which Matthew seems to have got his spelling, uses the spellings Jeconiah, making it less likely that the name would be confused with Jehoiakim. Moreover the repeating of Jeconiah's name in the next verse matches the repeating of names that occurs throughout the genealogy. Gundry believes that brothers refers to the Jewish people in general who were brought to Babylon with their king, not the biological brothers of Jeconiah. Harold Fowler suggests that brothers might have simply meant family, and the word was included since Jeconiah's family did have an important role in the Old Testament reports.

Fowler believes that the omission was explicitly intended. He argues that the "at the time of the exile to Babylon" makes it clear that this is not simply a genealogy, but also a quick summary of Jewish history. As such leaving out names would simply be part of the attempt to compress thousands of years of history into seventeen verses. The story of the Babylonian captivity is a long and complicated one, with many figures involved. Fowler argues that the word brothers was included to allow Matthew to simply skip over this tangled period without being diverted from his task by mentioning the actual names.

Preceded by Matthew 1:10	Gospel of Matthew; Chapter 1	Succeeded by Matthew 1:12
