= Codex Campianus =

Uncial 021
- New Testament manuscript
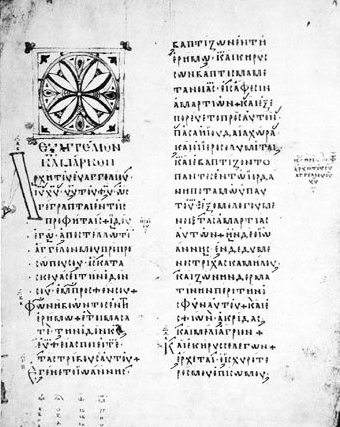
- Folio 91 recto, beginning of Mark. The right-hand margin contains a liturgical note: κυριακή προ των φώτων, "on Sunday before Epiphany"
- Name: Campianus
- Sign: M
- Text: Gospels
- Date: 9th century
- Script: Greek
- Now at: Bibliothèque nationale de France, Gr. 48
- Size: 22 cm by 16.3 cm
- Type: Byzantine text-type
- Category: V
- Hand: elegantly written
- Note: Marginalia

Codex Campianus is a Greek uncial manuscript of the New Testament Gospels, written on parchment. It is designated as "M" or "021" in the Gregory-Aland numbering of New Testament manuscripts, and ε 72 in the von Soden numbering of New Testament manuscripts. Using the study of comparative writings styles (palaeography), it has been assigned to the 9th century CE.

The manuscript has complex contents. It has marginal notes and was prepared for liturgical (religious) use. It contains musical notation surrounding some of the text, with a Harmony of the Gospels included at the bottom of each page. Art miniatures are included of the respective evangelists before each Gospel.

The text of the manuscript was held in high esteem by some 19th-century scholars, but this general opinion changed in the 20th century; as a result the manuscript is rarely cited in critical editions of the Greek New Testament.

== Description ==
The manuscript is a codex (precursor to the modern book format), containing the complete text of the four Gospels, written on 257 parchment leaves (sized 22 cm by 16.3 cm). The text is written in two columns per page, 24 lines per column, in brown ink. The leaves are arranged in quarto (this being four parchment leaves placed on top of each other and folded in half), and according to Biblical scholar Frederick H. A. Scrivener, it is written in a "very elegant and minute uncial" script. The letters are similar in style and look to those from Codex Mosquensis II (V). The breathing marks (utilised to designate vowel emphasis) and accents (used to indicate voiced pitch changes) have been added in red ink, along with some musical notation. Lines for which the text is to be written were drawn with a sharp point, and the letters are written on the line, as opposed to being suspended under. A middle point is used as a phrase mark.

Quotations from the Old Testament are indicated, with miniature pictures of the four Evangelists before each Gospel, with Mark, Luke, and John all sat down. Ornamentations are included at the beginning of each Gospel, decorated in red and blue ink, and the larger initials of each section are also ornamented in red and blue ink. Beginning (ἀρχή / arche) and ending (τέλος / telos) marks used for the weekly lection readings of the Church's calendar are also written. The liturgical notes in the margin are written in minuscule letters. According to Biblical scholar Constantin von Tischendorf, the handwriting of the liturgical notes in the margin is very similar to the Oxford manuscript of Plato dated to the year 895 and housed at the Bodleian Library.

The manuscript has a number of errors due to contemporary changes in the pronunciation of Greek, a phenomenon known as iotacism. It has errors of final nu (this being the inclusion of the Greek letter ν/n after certain verbs before a following word starting with a vowel, or the omission of the ν/n before a word starting with a consonant). The text of the Gospels is divided according to the Ammonian Sections and the Eusebian Canons (both early divisions of the gospels into sections). It has a Harmony of the Gospels written at the bottom of the pages.

Besides the New Testament text, it contains a Chronology of the Gospels, the Epistle to Carpianus, the Eusebian Canon tables, liturgical books with the Synaxarion and Menologion hagiographies, αναγνώσματα (anagnosmata / notes of the Church Lessons), with the titles of the chapters (known as τίτλοι / titloi) written at the top of the pages. There is some Arabic text on the last leaf, and a note in Slavonic which no one appears to have provided a translation for nor noted its location in the manuscript. The Arabic note is illegible except for one word, "Jerusalem". Some notes are written in very small letters.

== Text ==
The Greek text of the codex is considered a representative of the Byzantine text-type, with a number of Caesarean readings. The text-types are groups of different New Testament manuscripts which share specific or generally related readings, which then differ from each other group, and thus the conflicting readings can separate out the groups. These are then used to determine the original text as published; there are three main groups with names: Alexandrian, Western, and Byzantine. Tischendorf states its text is close to Codex Cyprius (K). The textual critic Hermann von Soden describes its text is a result of Pamphilus of Caesarea's recension. It has a similar text to the minuscules 27, 71, 692, and 1194, indicating it is one of the manuscripts in Family 1424.

Biblical scholars Kurt and Barbara Aland gave it the textual profile of 2^{1}, 2^{1/2}, 8^{2}, 3^{s}. This means the text of the codex agrees with the Byzantine standard text 202 times, 7 times with the original text against the Byzantine, and it agrees both with the Byzantine and original text 106 times. There are 12 independent or distinctive readings in this codex. Kurt Aland assigned the manuscript to Category V of his New Testament manuscript classification system. Category V manuscripts are described as having "a purely or predominantly Byzantine text."

In Matthew 1:11 it has the additional text τὸν Ἰωακίμ· Ἰωακὶμ δὲ ἐγέννησεν / Joakim. And Joakim fathered. This is also found in manuscripts Codex Koridethi (Θ), Codex Rossanensis (Σ), ƒ^{1}, 33, 258, 478, 661, 791, 954, 1216, 1230, 1354, 1604, ℓ 54, syr^{h} and other manuscripts. This variation was observed by Bernard de Montfaucon.

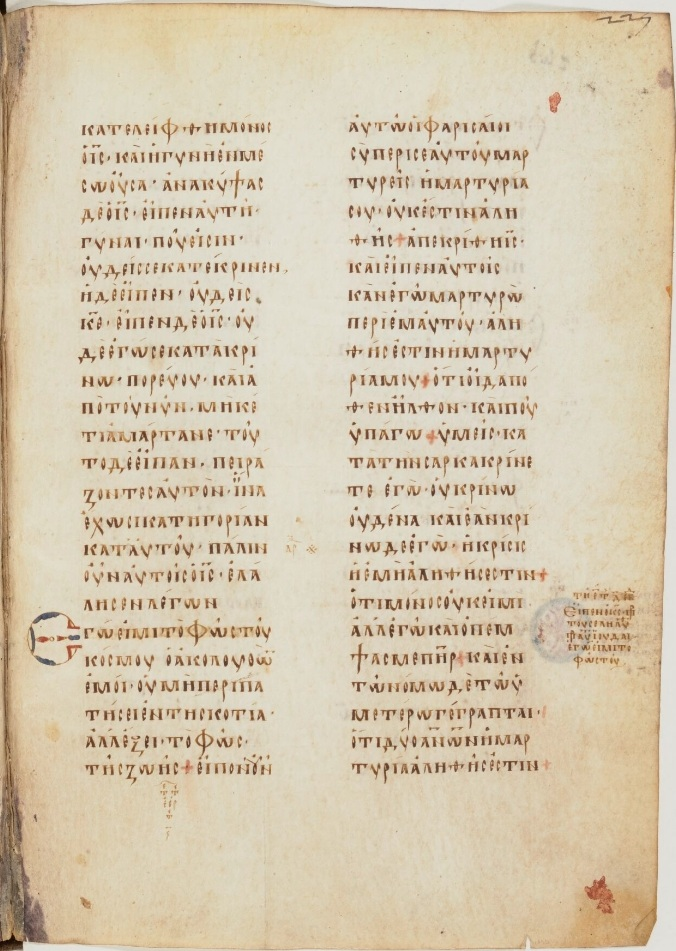
The Pericope Adulterae (John 8:9-11) in the manuscript, with additional text at the end of 8:11

Though they are usually left out of modern critical Greek New Testaments, Matthew 16:2f-3, Luke 22:43f and John 5:4 are all included without any marks of doubtful or spuriousness in the manuscript. Whilst it contains the text of the Pericope Adulterae (John 7:53-8:11), it has it surrounded by asterisks to note reservations about its inclusion, but also has an interesting variation in John 8:11, where it adds after the traditional 8:11:

τοῦτο δὲ εἶπαν πειράζοντες αὐτόν, ἵνα ἔχωσιν κατηγορίαν κατʼ αὐτοῦ
But this they said tempting him, that they might have [means] to accuse him

This is a dislocation of verse 6. The traditional text of John 8:11 is "She said, 'No man, Lord'. And Jesus said unto her, 'Neither do I condemn thee: go, and sin no more.' ", without any further words.

== History ==
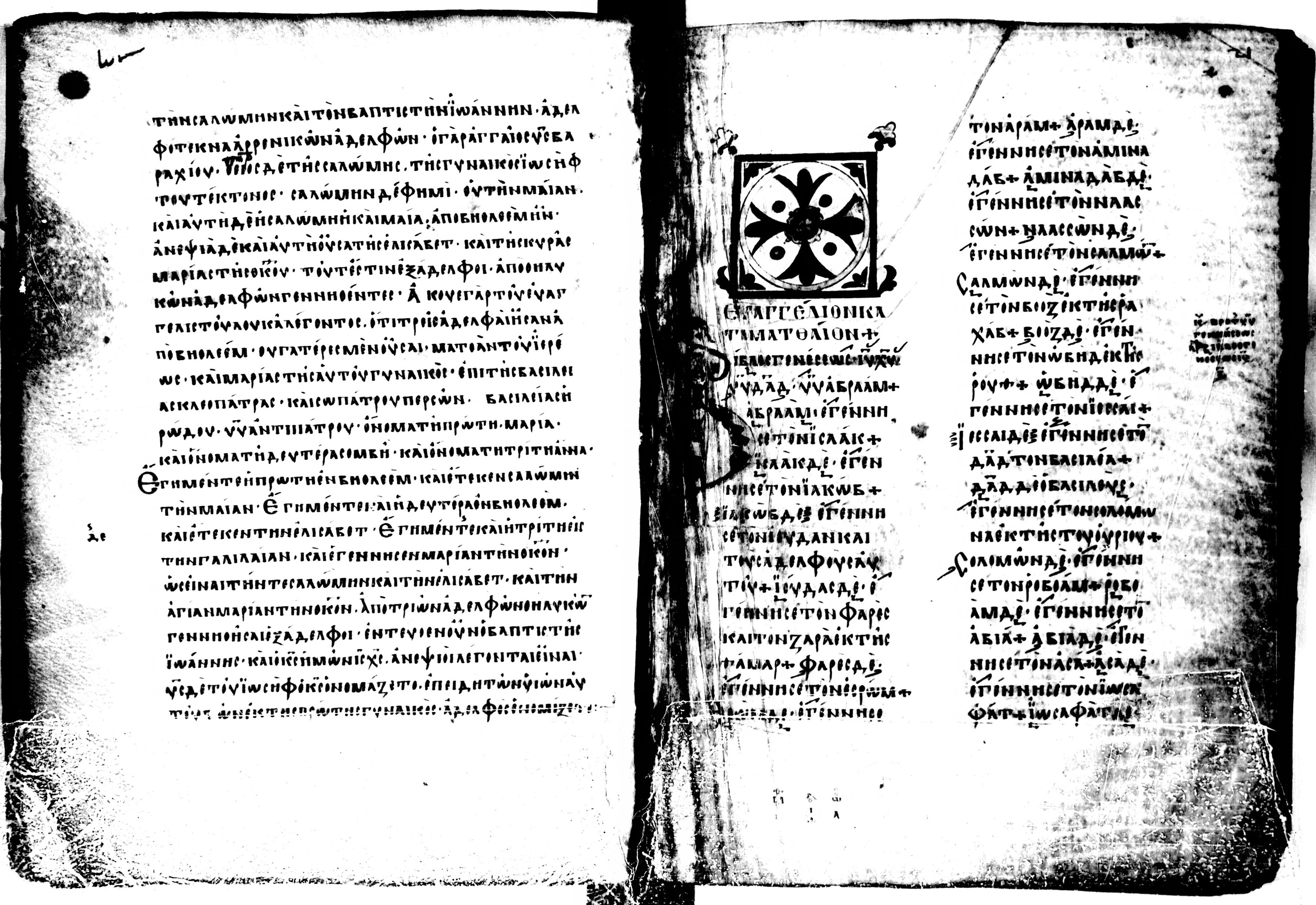
The beginning of Matthew

The earliest history of the manuscript is unknown. It was called Campianus after the Abbott François de Camps, who gave it to King Louis XIV of France. The year in which this occurred is muddled, as the earliest scholar to note this (Ludolph Kuster) says it was presented in 1607; however this is an impossibility due to King Louis XIV not being born until 1638. Biblical scholars Tischendorf, Caspar René Gregory and Samuel P. Tregelles give the date as 1706, but Scrivener gives it as 1707, with these scholars evidently trying to decipher whether Kuster had it misprinted either with mixed up numbers, or the wrong century. Montfaucon also notes this presentation to the King, but provides no year.

The codex was examined and described by Montfaucon, who gave its first description and first facsimile, and by Giuseppe Bianchini, who collated its text. It was used by Kuster in 1710 and reprinted by him for scholar John Mill's Novum Testamentum Graecum. The text was collated by Scholz and Tregelles. The codex was added by the Swiss theologian Johann J. Wettstein to his list of New Testament manuscripts, giving it the siglum "M". It was added by Gregory to his list of New Testament manuscripts in 1908, where it was given the siglum "021", and retained Wettstein's M siglum.

Some non-biblical material of the codex, such as the Synaxarion and Menologion (with the same from Codex Cyprius, Minuscule 262, and Minuscule 274), was published in 1830 by scholar Johann M. Scholz in his Novum Testamentum Graece, but "satis vitiose" (quite defectively) according to Tischendorf. Dean Burgon has observed that its Harmony of the Gospels is of the same type as in Codex Basilensis (E).

19th century scholars commented on the text of the manuscript, with Tregelles saying, "[i]t contains many good readings" and Scrivener said the readings from the manuscript are "very good". Since the 20th century the manuscript has remained largely neglected by scholars and its text is classified as of "low value" (as per the V of Aland's categories). Scholar Russell Champlin examined its text in the Gospel of Matthew and its relationship to the textual Family E.

The manuscript was cited in at least one critical edition of the United Bible Society's Greek New Testament, UBS3, but it is not cited in the following edition UBS4. It is not considered one of the manuscripts among the "consistently cited witnesses" in the German Bible Society's Novum Testamentum Graece Nestle-Aland 26th edition, nor the 27th edition, where it is only cited as an "occasionally cited witness" when its text "diverge[s] from the Koine text in passages of special interest for the history of the text or for exegesis." In the 28th edition of the Nestle-Aland NTG, the manuscript is no longer listed nor cited in the apparatus.

Bernard de Montfaucon dated the manuscript to the 10th or 11th century due to palaeographical similarities with the manuscripts housed in Italian libraries. Tischendorf dated it to the second half of the 9th century, arguing that its liturgical notes of the codex share similarities with those found in the Oxford manuscript of Plato dated to the year 895. Tregelles dated it to the end of the 9th century or beginning of the 10th century. It is currently dated by the Institute for New Testament Textual Research (INTF) to the 9th century. It is currently housed in the National Library of France (shelf number Gr. 48) in Paris.

== See also ==
- List of New Testament uncials
- Textual criticism
- Biblical manuscript
