= Matthew 1:12 =

- ← 1:11 1:13 →
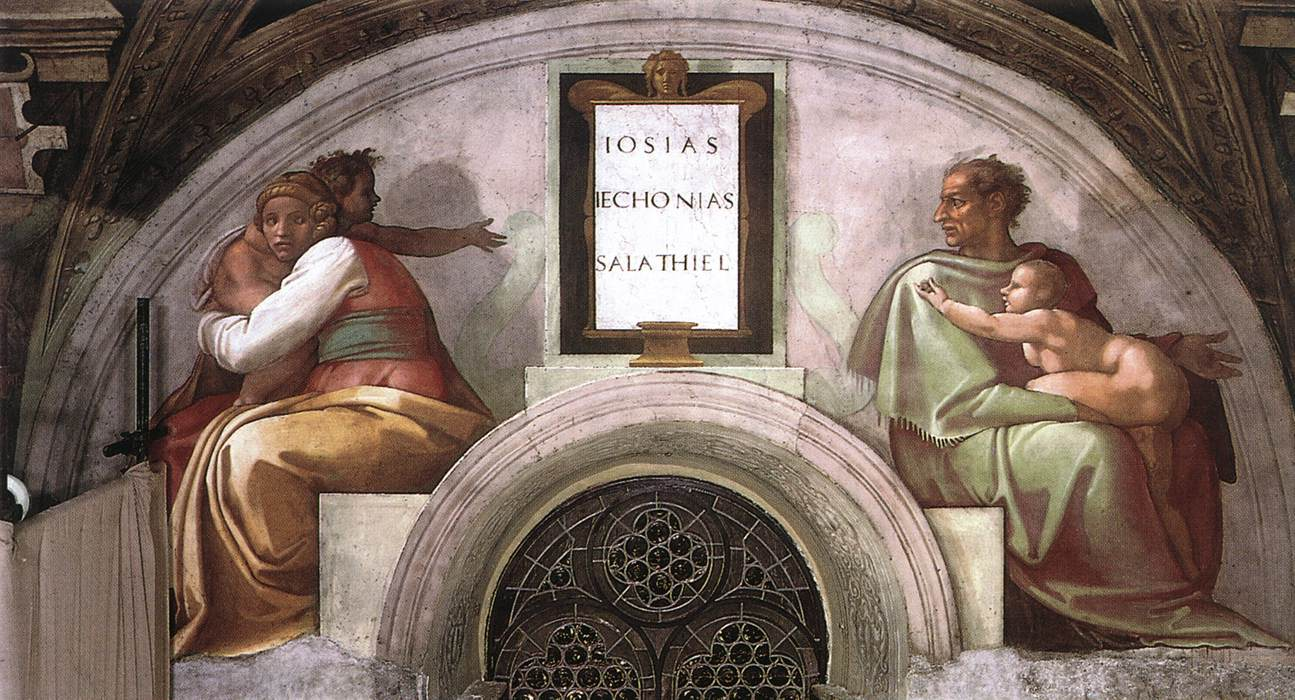
- Michelangelo's Josiah-Jechoniah-Sheatiel. Josiah is generally seen as the man on the right with Jechoniah being the child on his knee. The boy being held by the woman is Shealtiel.
- Book: Gospel of Matthew
- Christian Bible part: New Testament

Matthew 1:12 is the twelfth verse of the first chapter of the Gospel of Matthew in the New Testament. The verse is part of the section where the genealogy of Joseph, the betrothed of Mary, the mother of Jesus Christ, is listed.

== Content ==
In the King James Version of the Bible the text reads:

And after they were brought to Babylon,
Jechonias begat Salathiel;
and Salathiel begat Zorobabel;

The World English Bible translates the passage as:

After the exile to Babylon,
Jechoniah became the father of Shealtiel.
Shealtiel became the father of Zerubbabel.

For a collection of other versions see BibleHub Matthew 1:12

== Analysis ==
Jeconiah was a King of Judah, the last of these kings to be included among Joseph's ancestors. He was captured and brought to Babylon along with many of his subjects, beginning the Babylonian captivity. His son Shealtiel was born in Babylon, as was Shealtiel's son Zerubbabel. It was Zerubbabel who led the Jews out of exile in Babylon and he plays a prominent role in the Book of Ezra.

Zerubbabel and Shealtiel are also listed in the genealogy of Luke 3:27. However, in Luke, Shealtiel is not listed as the son of Jechoniah but rather of Neri. A number of explanations have been advanced to explain this. Robert H. Gundry believes that Luke gives the actual physical genealogy while Matthew is presenting the ceremonial one. Thus Neri was Shealtiel's natural father, but it was from Jeconiah which came the leadership of the Jewish people. This may link in with the prophecy of Jeremiah 36:30, which states that Jehoiakim's children would never again sit on the throne of David because of his sins. By having Shealtiel be the biological son of Neri, and only the adopted son of Jechoniah, this prohibition is avoided.

This is further complicated as 1 Chronicles 3:19 states that the father of Zerubbabel was Pedaiah, a brother of Shealtiel. Zerubbabel, which means "born in Babylon" was a common name and it is entirely possible that Zerubbabel son of Shealtiel had a cousin also named Zerubbabel.

Gundry notes that the opening line "after the exile to Babylon" clearly does not refer to this verse alone. Jeconiah and Shealtiel were in no way after the exile. Rather, the first line is an introduction to this last third of the biography that covers the period from the captivity to the birth of Jesus.

== Resources ==
- Albright, W.F. and C.S. Mann. "Matthew." The Anchor Bible Series. New York: Doubleday & Company, 1971.
- Fowler, Harold. The Gospel of Matthew: Volume One. Joplin: College Press, 1968

Preceded by Matthew 1:11	Gospel of Matthew; Chapter 1	Succeeded by Matthew 1:13
