= Minuscule 791 =

- New Testament manuscript
- Text: Gospels
- Date: 12th century
- Script: Greek
- Now at: National Library of Greece
- Size: 21.5 cm by 15.5 cm
- Type: Byzantine text-type
- Category: none
- Note: –

Minuscule 791 (in the Gregory-Aland numbering), ε464 (von Soden), is a Greek minuscule manuscript of the New Testament written on paper. Palaeographically it has been assigned to the 12th century. The manuscript has complex contents.

== Description ==
The codex contains the text of the four Gospels, on 229 parchment leaves (size 21.5 cm by 15.5 cm). The text of Mark 1:1-4:19 was written by second hand, the text of Mark 4:20-7:30 by third hand.

The text is written in one column per page, 24 lines per page.

The text is divided according to the κεφαλαια (chapters), whose numbers are given at the margin, with their τιτλοι (titles) at the top of the pages. There is also another division according to the smaller Ammonian Sections (except end of Mark), but without references to the Eusebian Canons (at the beginning).

It contains Eusebian tables at the beginning, lectionary markings at the margin, a liturgical book Synaxarion (later hand), Verses (later hand), and pictures.

== Text ==
The Greek text of the codex is a representative of the Byzantine text-type. Hermann von Soden classified it to the textual family K^{ak}. Aland did not place it in any Category.

According to the Claremont Profile Method it represent the textual cluster 22a in Luke 1 and Luke 20. In Luke 10 no profile was made.

In Matthew 1:11 it reads Ιωσιας δε εγεννησεν τον Ιωακειμ, Ιωακειμ δε εγεννησεν τον Ιεχονιαν instead of Ιωσιας δε εγεννησεν τον Ιεχονιαν. The reading is supported by Codex Campianus, Codex Koridethi, f^{1}, 33, 258, 478, 661, 954, 1216, 1230, 1354, 1604, ℓ 54.

== History ==
According to C. R. Gregory the manuscript was written in the 14th century. The manuscript is currently dated by the INTF to the 12th century.

The manuscript was noticed in catalogue from 1876.

It was added to the list of New Testament manuscripts by Gregory (791). Gregory saw the manuscript in 1886.

The manuscript is now housed at the National Library of Greece (77) in Athens.

== See also ==
- List of New Testament minuscules
- Biblical manuscript
- Textual criticism
- Minuscule 790
