= Lectionary 54 =

Lectionary ℓ 54
- New Testament manuscript
- Text: Evangelistarion, Apostolos
- Date: 1470
- Script: Greek
- Now at: State Historical Museum
- Size: 21 cm by 14.8 cm

Lectionary 54, designated by siglum ℓ 54 (in the Gregory-Aland numbering). It is a Greek manuscript of the New Testament on paper leaves. It is dated by a colophon to the year 1470.

== Description ==
The codex is an Euchologium, with lessons from the New Testament lectionary, on 344 paper leaves (21 cm by 14.8 cm). It is written in one column per page, in 24 lines per page, in Greek minuscule letters.

In Matthew 1:11 it reads Ιωσιας δε εγεννησεν τον Ιωακειμ, Ιωακειμ δε εγεννησεν τον Ιεχονιαν instead of Ιωσιας δε εγεννησεν τον Ιεχονιαν. The reading is supported by Codex Campianus, Codex Koridethi, Σ, f^{1}, 33, 258, 478, 661, 791, 954, 1216, 1230, 1354, 1604.

== History ==
The manuscript was written by Dometius, a monk. It came from the monastery of Vatopedi on the Athos. The manuscript was examined by Matthaei.

The manuscript is sporadically cited in the critical editions of the Greek New Testament (UBS3).

Currently the codex is located in the State Historical Museum, (V. 263, S. 281) in Moscow.

== See also ==
- List of New Testament lectionaries
- Biblical manuscript
- Textual criticism
