= Minuscule 478 =

- New Testament manuscript
- Text: Gospels
- Date: 10th century
- Script: Greek
- Now at: British Library
- Size: 17.5 cm by 12 cm
- Type: Byzantine text-type
- Category: V
- Hand: beautifully written
- Note: marginalia

Minuscule 478 (in the Gregory-Aland numbering), ε 1082 (in the Soden numbering), is a Greek minuscule manuscript of the New Testament, on parchment. Palaeographically it has been assigned to the 10th century. Scrivener labeled it by number 575. It has complex context and full marginalia.

== Description ==
The codex contains a complete text of the four Gospels on 268 parchment leaves (size 17.5 cm by 12 cm), without any lacunae. The text is written in one column per page, 26 lines per page.

The text is divided according to the κεφαλαια (chapters), whose numbers are given at the margin, and their τιτλοι (titles of chapters) at the top of the pages. There is also a division according to the smaller Ammonian Sections, with references to the Eusebian Canons (written below Ammonian Section numbers).

It contains the Epistula ad Carpianum, Eusebian Canon tables, tables of the κεφαλαια (tables of contents) before each Gospel, lectionary markings at the margin (for liturgical use), subscriptions at the end of each Gospel, numbers of stichometry, and scholia. The manuscript is elegantly and correctly written. It contains the pericope John 7:53-8:11 but marked with an obelus.

== Text ==
The Greek text of the codex is a representative of the Byzantine text-type. Aland placed it in Category V.

According to the Claremont Profile Method it represents textual family K^{x} in Luke 1, Luke 10, and Luke 20.

In Matthew 1:11, it reads Ιωσιας δε εγεννησεν τον Ιωακειμ, Ιωακειμ δε εγεννησεν τον Ιεχονιαν instead of Ιωσιας δε εγεννησεν τον Ιεχονιαν. The reading is supported by Codex Campianus, Codex Koridethi, Σ, f^{1}, 33, 258, 661, 791, 954, 1216, 1230, 1354, 1604, ℓ 54.

== History ==
Currently the manuscript is dated by the INTF to the 10th century.

The manuscript once belonged to Bishop of Caesarea Palaestina. It was purchased by the British Museum from R. H. Evans, 24 January 1838, lot 23. According to the 1838 sale catalogue, it was "procured from the Library of the Bishop of Philippi at the foot of Mount Lebanon".

The manuscript was examined and collated by Scrivener, who published its text in 1852. The manuscript was added to the list of New Testament manuscripts by Scrivener (575) and Gregory (478). It was re-examined by Bloomfield. C. R. Gregory saw it in 1883.

It is currently housed at the British Library (Add MS 11300) in London.

== See also ==
- List of New Testament minuscules
- Biblical manuscript
- Textual criticism
