= Minuscule 372 =

- New Testament manuscript
- Text: Gospels
- Date: 16th century
- Script: Greek
- Now at: Vatican Library
- Size: 24.2 cm by 16.7 cm
- Type: mixed
- Category: none
- Hand: beautifully written

Minuscule 372 (in the Gregory-Aland numbering), ε 600 (Soden), is a Greek minuscule manuscript of the New Testament, on parchment. Palaeographically it has been assigned to the 16th century. It is almost without a marginal equipment.

== Description ==
The codex contains the text of the four Gospels on 199 parchment leaves (24.2 cm by 16.7 cm) with one big lacunae (John 3:1-21:25). It is written in one column per page, in 30 lines per page. According to Scrivener it is beautifully written.

The text is divided according to the κεφαλαια (chapters), whose numbers are given at the margin (in Latin).

== Text ==
Hermann von Soden classified its to the I^{a}, which would make it "Western" or "Caesarean". Kurt Aland the Greek text of the codex did not place in any Category.

According to the Claremont Profile Method it represents mixed text in Luke 1, Luke 10, and Luke 20. Wisse stated that its text is very strange.

== History ==
Probably it was written in Italy, by Honoratus (?). The manuscript was added to the list of New Testament manuscripts by Scholz (1794–1852). C. R. Gregory saw it in 1886.

The manuscript is currently housed at the Vatican Library (Vat. gr. 1161) in Rome.

== See also ==
- List of New Testament minuscules
- Biblical manuscript
- Textual criticism
