= Minuscule 661 =

- New Testament manuscript
- Text: Gospels
- Date: 11th century
- Script: Greek language
- Now at: Jagiellonian Library
- Size: 25 cm by 18 cm
- Type: Byzantine text-type
- Category: none

Minuscule 661 (in the Gregory-Aland numbering), ε 179 (von Soden), is a Greek language minuscule manuscript of the New Testament, on parchment. Palaeographically it has been assigned to the 11th century. The manuscript has complex contents. Scrivener labelled it by 639^{e}.

== Description ==
The codex contains a complete text of the four Gospels, on 234 parchment leaves (size 25 cm by 18 cm). The text is written in one column per page, 23 lines per page. It contains the tables of the κεφαλαια before every Gospel, and the portrait of the Evangelist is placed only before Gospel of John. There are no Eusebian tables before the Gospels.

The text is divided according to the κεφαλαια (chapters), and according to the Ammonian Sections (in Mark 234 sections, the last numbered section in 16:9). The numerals of the κεφαλαια are given at the left margin, and their τιτλοι (titles) at the top of the pages. The Ammonian Sections are given with a references to the Eusebian Canons (written under Ammonian Sections).

The manuscript contains additional material at the end, "East Canon" for the years 1034-1037.

== Text ==
The Greek text of the codex is representative of the Byzantine text-type. Hermann von Soden lists it to the textual family K^{1}, which is according to him the oldest family of the Byzantine text-type. Kurt Aland did not examine the Greek text of the codex by his method of thousand readings, and therefore he did not place it in any Category. The text of the manuscript was not examined by using the Claremont Profile Method.

The texts of Matthew 16:2b–3 (the signs of the times), Christ's agony at Gethsemane (Luke 22:43-44), John 5:3-4, and the Pericope Adulterae (John 7:53-8:11) are marked with an asterisk (※) as doubtful. The text of Mark 16:9-20 has no numbered κεφαλαια (chapters) at the margin, their τιτλοι (titles) at the top, nor Ammonian Sections and references to the Eusebian Canons.

Matthew 1:11

It reads Ιωσιας δε εγεννησεν τον Ιωακειμ, Ιωακειμ δε εγεννησεν τον Ιεχονιαν instead of Ιωσιας δε εγεννησεν τον Ιεχονιαν. The reading is supported by Codex Campianus, Codex Koridethi, Rossano Gospels, f^{1}, 33, 258, 478, 791, 954, 1216, 1230, 1354, 1604, ℓ 54.

== History ==
Scrivener and C. R. Gregory dated the manuscript to the 11th century. Currently the manuscript is dated by the INTF to the 11th century.

The manuscript was brought from the East to Berlin. It was added to the list of New Testament manuscripts by Scrivener and Gregory. Gregory saw the manuscript in 1887. It was housed in Berlin in the Preußische Königliche Bibliothek (then Prussian State Library, then Berlin State Library) with the shelf-number Gr. quarto 67.

The Prussian State Library sent many collections out of Berlin to be sheltered in Silesia for safekeeping during World War II. As the result of postwar border changes some of these collections were found in Poland (among them minuscule 661). They were moved to the Jagiellonian University Library.

Currently the manuscript is housed at the Biblioteka Jagiellońska (Fonds der Berliner Handschriften, Graec. quarto 67), in Kraków.

== See also ==
- List of New Testament minuscules
- Biblical manuscript
- Textual criticism
