= Codex Koridethi =

Uncial 038
- New Testament manuscript
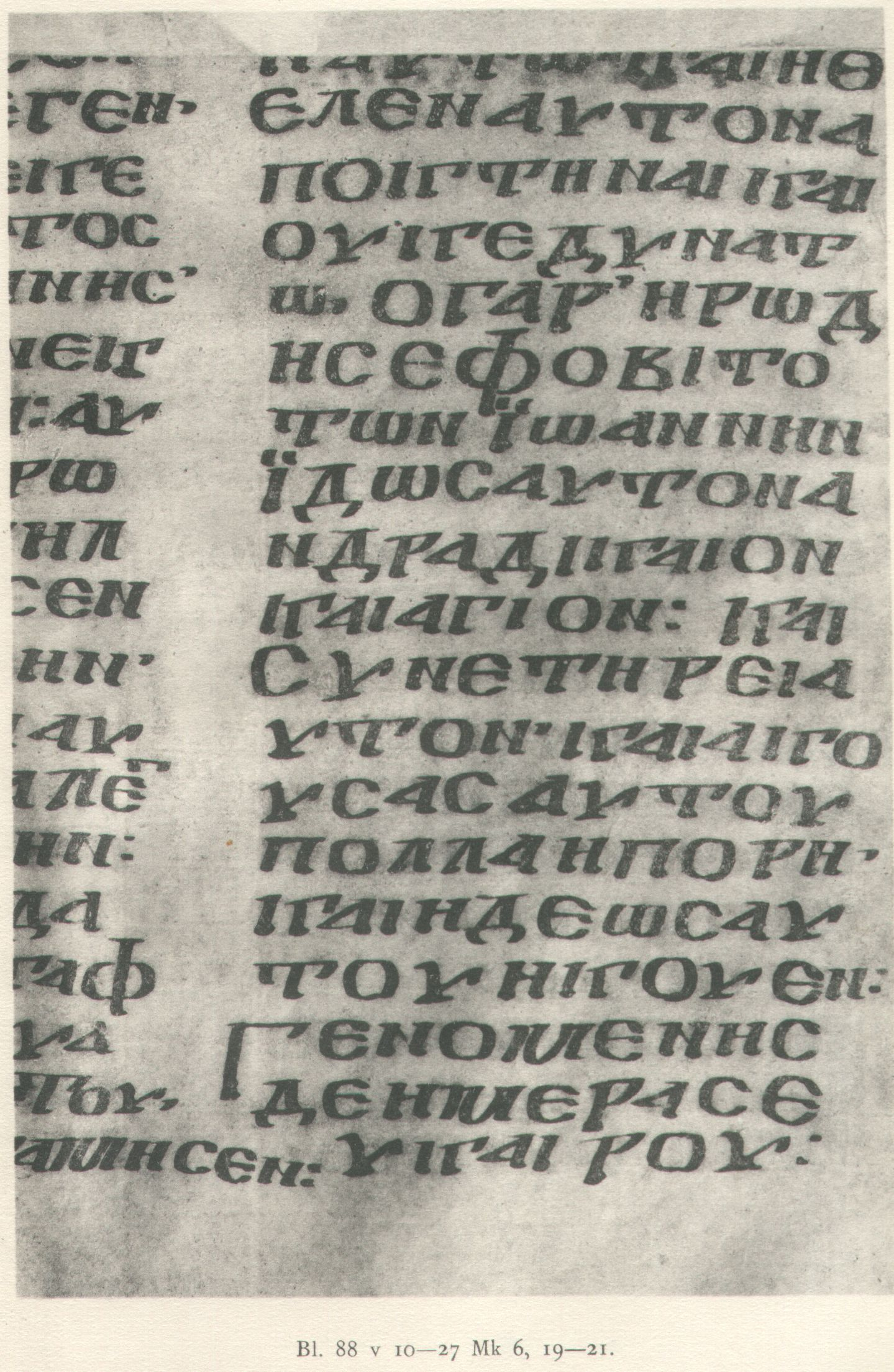
- A portion of the Codex Koridethi, containing Mark 6:19–21
- Name: Coridethianus
- Sign: Θ
- Text: Gospels
- Date: 9th century
- Script: Greek
- Found: 1853
- Now at: Georgian National Center of Manuscripts
- Size: 29 x 24 cm
- Type: Caesarean text-type / Byzantine text-type
- Category: II

Codex Koridethi, also named Codex Coridethianus, is a Greek uncial manuscript of the New Testament Gospels, written on parchment. It is designated by the siglum Θ or 038 in the Gregory-Aland numbering of New Testament manuscripts, and as ε050 in the Soden numbering of New Testament manuscripts. Using the study of comparative writing styles (palaeography), it has been assigned to the 9th century CE. The manuscript has several gaps. It has been considered by scholars as a leading member of the Caesarean text-type in the Gospel of Mark.

== Description ==
The manuscript is a codex (precursor to the modern book format), containing an almost complete text of the four Gospels written on 249 parchment leaves (size 29 cm by 24 cm), with the following gaps: Matthew 1:1–9, 1:21–4:4, and 4:17–5:4. The text is written in two columns per page, with 19-32 lines per column. The letters are written in a rough, inelegant hand in blackish-brown ink. Greek accents (used to indicate voiced pitch changes) are written, but breathing marks (utilised to designate vowel emphasis) are rarely included.

The scribe who wrote the text is believed to have been unfamiliar with Greek. The manuscript includes the Ammonian sections, but not always the Eusebian Canons, both early systems of dividing the four Gospels into different sections. Lectionary (weekly church reading portions) beginning (αρχη / arche) and ending (τελος / telos) marks are also written.

Quotations from the Old Testament are marked. The tables of contents (known as κεφαλαια / kephalaia) are included before the gospels of Mark, Luke, and John (it is unable to confirm whether there was a contents-table before Matthew, as the manuscript is missing up to Matt 1:9). A brief subscription is written after the Gospel of John ends.

== Text of the codex ==
The Greek text of the Gospel of Matthew chapters 1-14, and the whole of the Gospel of Luke and Gospel of John is considered to be more or less a representative of the Byzantine text-type, while the text of the Gospel of Mark has been considered to be a representative of the Caesarean text-type. The text-types are groups of different New Testament manuscripts which share specific or generally related readings, which then differ from each other group, and thus the conflicting readings can separate out the groups. These are then used to determine the original text as published; there are three main groups with names: Alexandrian, Western, and Byzantine.

The Caesarean text-type, initially identified by biblical scholar Burnett Hillman Streeter, has been contested by several text-critics, such as Kurt and Barbara Aland. The text of Matthew chapters 14-28 has been considered to be a representative of the Alexandrian text-type. Aland placed it in Category II of his New Testament manuscript classification system. Category II manuscripts are described as being manuscripts "of a special quality, i.e., manuscripts with a considerable proportion of the early text, but which are marked by alien influences. These influences are usually of smoother, improved readings, and in later periods by infiltration by the Byzantine text." It lacks the text of the Pericope Adulterae (John 7:53-8:11).

Textual critic Hermann von Soden classified the manuscript among his I^{α} group, a sub-group of manuscripts he believed represented his "Jerusalem" (I) text: Codex Bezae, Uncial 079, minuscules 21, 28, 372, 544, 565, 700, 1542, 1654, the Old Latin, and the Old Syriac. This grouping is apparently "wie namentlich M[ar]k deutlich zeigt" (particularly shown in Mark). von Soden describes Kordethi as providing a "eine sehr wertvolle Parallele zu [Bezae]" (very valuable parallel to [Bezae]), and after Bezae is "der beste Zeuge von I^{α}" (the best evidence of I^{α}).

Caesarean text-type?

(See main article the Caesarean text-type)

Streeter based his identification of a new text-type primarily on the readings found on this codex in the Gospel of Mark, and their corresponding appearances in the biblical citations in the writings of the early church father, Origen. He also grouped the manuscripts of ƒ^{1}, ƒ^{13}, and the minuscules 28, 565 and 700 along with Codex Koridethi, initially designating them as fam. Θ.

His reasonings were developed further by biblical scholars Kirsopp Lake, Robert Blake and Silva New, resulting in this fam. Θ being designated the Caesarean Text-type in their joint publication, The Caesarean text of the Gospel of Mark, with Codex Koridethi being considered the Caesarean Text's chief representative. Though further publications sought to establish the Caesarean Text as a definitive text-type, by the end of the 20th century this notion had failed to convince the majority of scholars.

Witness to the Byzantine text-type?

In 2007, the German Bible Society edited The Gospel According to John in the Byzantine Tradition. Codex Koridethi is cited in the apparatus, and it says: "Manuscript 038 (Θ) represents a text on the boundary of what might reasonably be considered a manuscript of the Byzantine tradition in John".

Some readings

Matthew 1:11

Ιωσιας δε εγεννησεν τον Ιωακειμ, Ιωακειμ δε εγεννησεν τον Ιεχονιαν (Josiah fathered Jehoiakim; Jehoiakim fathered Jeconiah) - Θ M ƒ^{1} 33 258 478 661 791 ℓ 54 al
Ιωσιας δε εγεννησεν τον Ιεχονιαν (Josiah fathered Jeconiah) - Majority of manuscripts

Matthew 8:13

και υποστρεψας ο εκατονταρχος εις τον οικον αυτου εν αυτη τη ωρα ευρεν τον παιδα υγιαινοντα (and when the centurion returned to the house in that hour, he found the slave well) - Θ א C (N) 0250 ƒ^{1} g^{1}, sy^{h}
omit - Majority of manuscripts

Matthew 10:12

λεγοντες ειρηνη τω οικω τουτω (saying, 'Peace to this house.') - Θ א*^{,2} D L W ƒ^{1} 1010 (1424) it vg^{cl}
αυτην (this) - Majority of manuscripts

Matthew 12:7

ἐκεῖνοι δὲ οἱ γεωργοὶ, θεασάμενοι αὐτὸν ἐρχόμενον (But those tenants, looking on as he arrived) - Θ ƒ^{13} 28 1071

Matthew 20:23

και το βαπτισμα ο εγω βαπτιζομαι βαπτισθησεσθε (and be baptized with the baptism that I am baptized with)

omit - Θ א B D L Z 085 ƒ^{1} ƒ^{13} it sy^{s}^{, c} sa
incl. - Majority of manuscripts

Matthew 27:16

Ιησουν τον Βαραββαν (Jesus Barabbas) - Θ 700 ƒ^{1}
Ιησουν (Jesus) - Majority of manuscripts

Matthew 27:35

τα ιματια μου εαυτοις, και επι τον ιματισμον μου εβαλον κληρον (my clothes for themselves, and they cast lots for my cloak) — Θ Δ 0250 ƒ^{1} ƒ^{13} 537 1424

Mark 9:49

πας γαρ πυρι αναλωθησεται (for everything shall be consumed by fire) - Θ (singular reading)
πας γαρ πυρι αλισθησεται (for everything shall be seasoned with fire)- Majority of manuscripts

Luke 14:5

ὄνος υἱὸς ἢ βοῦς (donkey, son, or ox) - Θ (singular reading)
υἱὸς ἢ βοῦς (son or ox) - Majority of manuscripts

Luke 23:34

ὁ δὲ Ἰησοῦς ἔλεγεν Πάτερ ἄφες αὐτοῖς· οὐ γὰρ οἴδασιν τί ποιοῦσιν (And Jesus said: Father forgive them, they know not what they do.)

omit - Θ 𝔓^{75} א^{a} B D* W 0124 1241 a d sy^{s} sa bo
incl. - Majority of manuscripts

John 6:1

της θαλασσης της Γαλιλαιας εις τα μερη της Τιβεριαδος (the sea of Galilee in the region of Tiberius) – Θ D 892 1009 1230 1253

John 6:71

απο Καρυωτου (from Kariot) - Θ א ƒ^{13} syr^{h}
Ισκαριωτου (Iscariot) - Majority of manuscripts

John 18:11

παντες γαρ οι λαβοντες μαχαιραν εν μαχαιρα απολουνταιν (for everyone who takes the sword shall be destroyed by the sword) – Θ (singular reading)

== History ==
It is commonly believed the manuscript is named after the town in which it was discovered; however, this is not correct. The first publication of the entire manuscript by Beermann and Gregory states:

Kala/Caucasia:

In the year 1853 a certain Bartholomeé visited a long abandoned monastery in Kala, a little village in the Caucasian mountains near the Georgian/Russian border (some miles south east of the 5600m high Elbrus). There, in an old church, far off every civilisation, he discovered the MS. The MS rested there probably for several hundred years (Beermann: ca. 1300–1869).

Koridethi:

Before this time the MS was in a town called Koridethi. This was a village near the Black Sea, near today's Batumi in Georgia. There should still be some ruins of a monastery. Notes in the Gospel indicate dates from ca. 965 CE on. At around this time, according to a note, the book has been rebound. The book was there until around 1300 CE.

Further south, Armenia:

A Greek inscription mentions the city of Tephrice or Tephrike (Τεφρική): "I, Kurines, Comes of the comandant of the city Tephrice came to the castelles and went back to the fort of the Great Martyrs(?)." Even though the content and meaning is not completely clear, the city Tephrice is clear. The town was destroyed in 873. It was on a line between today's Sivas and Malatya in Turkey/Armenia. Beermann's conclusion therefore is (p. 581) that the codex must be older than 873 CE. Beermann speculates that the "fort of the Great Martyrs" (if correctly deciphered) might have been Martyropolis, a town near the Wan Lake, near today's Batman in Turkey.

The codex is now located in Tbilisi, at the Georgian National Center of Manuscripts, Gr. 28.

== See also ==
- List of New Testament uncials
