= Minuscule 258 =

- New Testament manuscript
- Name: Codex Dresdensis
- Text: Gospels
- Date: 13th century
- Script: Greek
- Now at: Dresden
- Size: 21.2 cm by 16.5 cm
- Category: none
- Hand: barbarously written

Minuscule 258 (in the Gregory-Aland numbering), ε 388 (Soden), is a Greek minuscule manuscript of the New Testament, on parchment. Paleographically it has been assigned to the 13th century.

== Description ==
The codex contains the text of the four Gospels on 168 parchment leaves (21.2 cm by 16.5 cm). The text is written in one column per page, 27-28 lines per page.

According to Scrivener it is barbarously written.

It contains lectionary markings at the margin (for liturgical use), Synaxarion, and pictures. The biblical text is surrounded by a commentary (catena).

== Text ==
Aland did not place its text in any Category. It was not examined by using the Claremont Profile Method.

Matthew 1:11

It reads Ιωσιας δε εγεννησεν τον Ιωακειμ, Ιωακειμ δε εγεννησεν τον Ιεχονιαν instead of Ιωσιας δε εγεννησεν τον Ιεχονιαν. The reading is supported by Codex Campianus, Codex Koridethi, f^{1}, 33, 478, 661, 791, 954, 1216, 1230, 1354, 1604, ℓ 54.

== History ==
Formerly the manuscript was held at the monastery at Athos peninsula. It was brought to Moscow, by the monk Arsenius, on the suggestion of the Patriarch Nikon, in the reign of Alexei Mikhailovich Romanov (1645-1676). The manuscript was collated by Dassdorf for C. F. Matthaei. It was bought for the library in Dresden.

It was examined by Tregelles. C. R. Gregory saw it in 1880.

The manuscript is currently housed at the Saxon State and University Library Dresden (SLUB) (Mscr. Dresd. A. 123), at Dresden. However, it cannot be used in its present state due to water damage.

== See also ==
- List of New Testament minuscules
- Biblical manuscript
- Textual criticism
