= Orto Botanico dell'Università della Calabria =

Botanical garden in Italy

Coordinates: 39°17′43″N 16°15′13″E

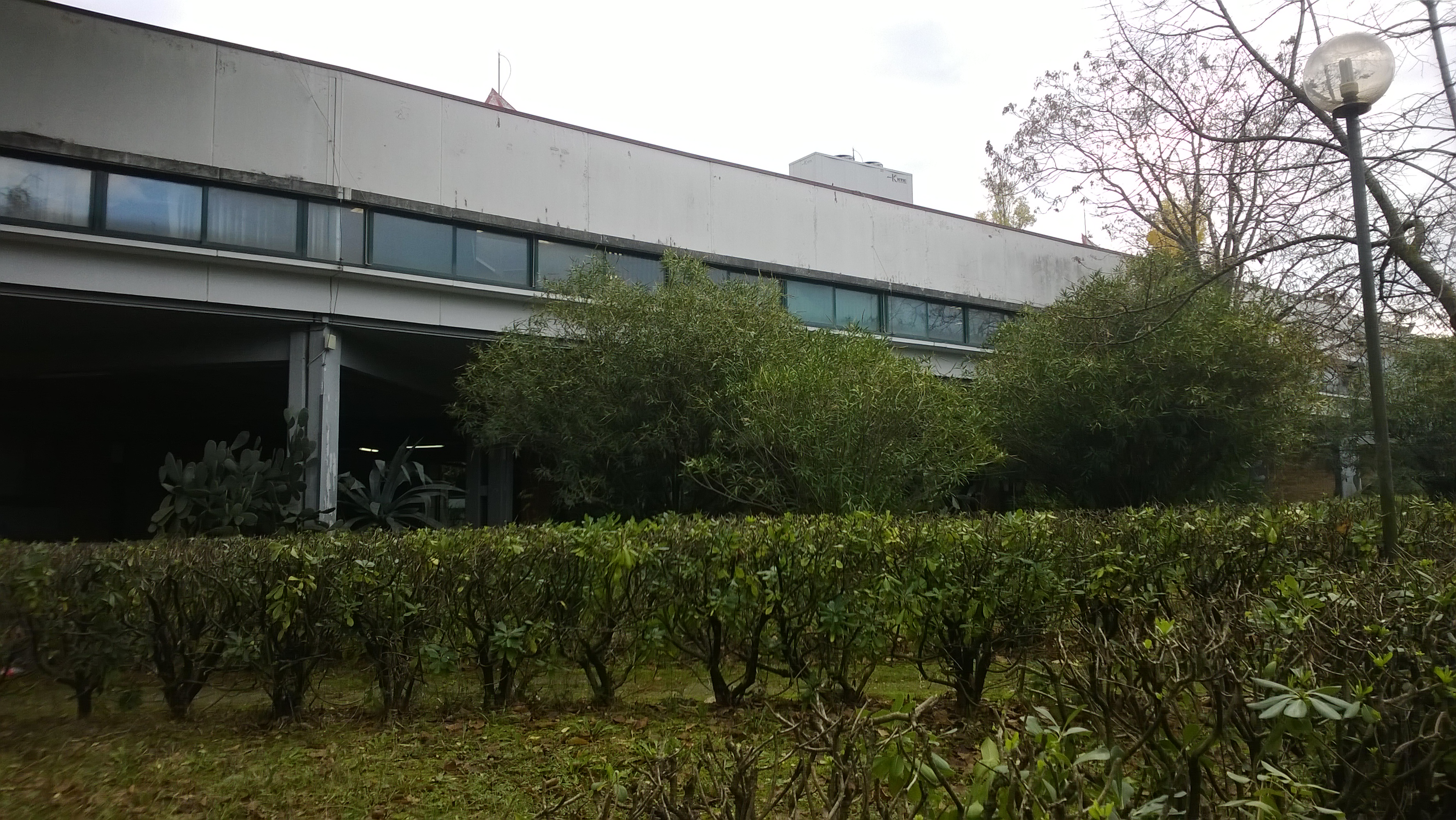
Orto Botanico dell'Università della Calabria

The Orto Botanico dell'Università della Calabria (8 hectares) is a botanical garden operated by the University of Calabria. It is located at I-87030 Via Pietro Bucci, Arcavacata di Rende, Province of Cosenza, Calabria, Italy.

== Species ==
The garden contains over 400 species of local Calabrian plants, as well as nonlocal introductions. Its natural vegetation is oak, primarily Quercus pubescens, with additional plantings of other oaks including Q. coccifera, Q. farnetto, Q. macrolepis, Q. pedunculata, and Q. trojana. Other trees include alders, poplars, and willows, with the addition of Liriodendron, Metasequoia, and Taxodium. The garden also contains two bamboo groves (Phyllostachys), and plantings of Equisetum telmateia, Ginkgo biloba, Osmunda regalis, Podocarpus, and Polypodium.

The garden includes two greenhouses. The first contains plants such as Adiantum capillus-veneris, Cyperus papyrus, Pinguicula hirtiflora, Pteris cretica, Pteris vittata, and Woodwardia radicans. The second contains wetland plants including Acorus calamus, Marsilea strigosa, Menyanthes trifoliata, Osmunda regalis, etc.

== See also ==
- List of botanical gardens in Italy
