= San Pietro in Guarano =

- Comune
- Comune di San Pietro in Guarano
- Location within Italy Location within Calabria
- Coordinates: 39°20′N 16°19′E
- Country: Italy
- Region: Calabria
- Province: Cosenza (CS)
- Frazioni: Redipiano, San Benedetto and Padula

Government
  - Mayor: Mario Veltri

Area
  - Total: 48.35 km^{2} (18.67 sq mi)
- Elevation: 625 m (2,051 ft)

Population (2018-01-01)
  - Total: 3,720
  - Density: 76.9/km^{2} (199/sq mi)
- Demonym: Sanpietresi
- Time zone: UTC+1 (CET)
  - Summer (DST): UTC+2 (CEST)
- Postal code: 87047
- Dialing code: 0984
- Patron saint: St. Peter
- Saint day: 29 June
- Website: Official website

San Pietro in Guarano is a town and comune in the province of Cosenza in the Calabria region of southern Italy.

== Geography ==
The town is bordered by Castiglione Cosentino, Celico, Lappano, Rende, Rose, Rovito and Zumpano.
