= Quattromiglia =

- Quartiere
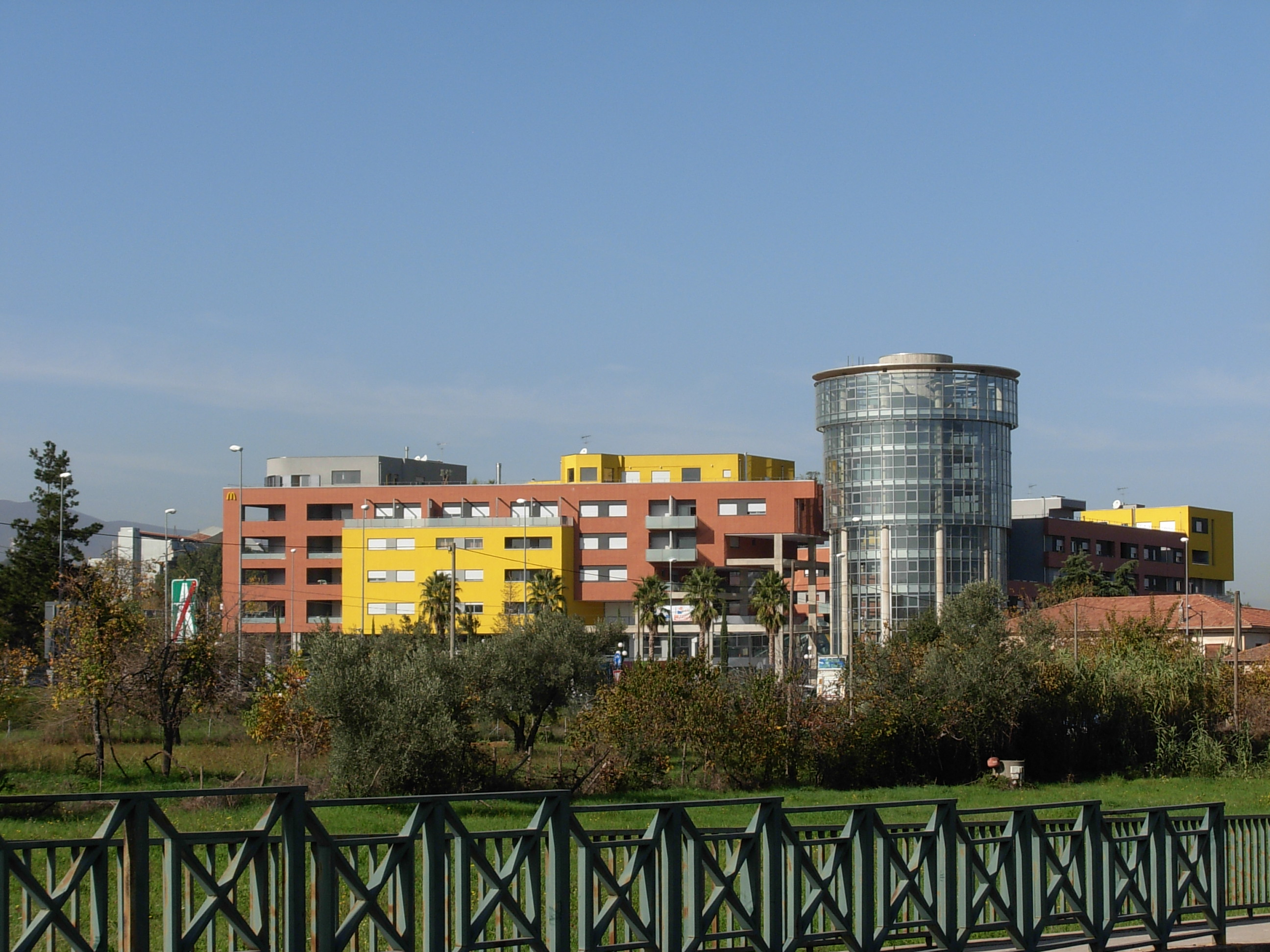
- Marconi Shopping Center at the motorway entrance of "Rende-Cosenza Nord"

- Location within Italy
- Coordinates: 39°21′14″N 16°14′32″E
- Country: Italy
- Region: Calabria
- Province: Province of Cosenza
- Comune: Rende
- Elevation: 180 m (590 ft)

Population
  - Total: 8,813
- Postal code: 87036
- Area code: (+39) 0984

Quattromiglia, also known as Quattromiglia di Rende, is an inhabited area of the municipality of Rende in the province of Cosenza, Calabria. With a population of 8,813, it is the most populated district of its municipality.

== History ==
The origin of the name, meaning "Four Miles", derives from the Latin words Quattuor (four) and Milia (mile). It was due to the name of a farmhouse, 4 miles far from Cosentia, the modern Cosenza. Founded at the end of the Middle Ages, the town urbanistically grew up in the 1970s, mainly due to the presence of the University of Calabria (2,2 km far), near the neighboring village of Arcavacata.

== Geography ==
Located in the northern suburb of Cosenza (6 km far), Quattromiglia is 8 from Castiglione Cosentino and 28 from Paola. It is extended along the national road SS 19 from the hills in the west to the river Crati in the east.

== Transport ==
Quattromiglia is served by the A3 motorway, crossing the town, at the exit "Rende-Cosenza Nord". It counts also a railway station, the one of Castiglione Cosentino, one the Paola-Cosenza line.

== Gallery ==
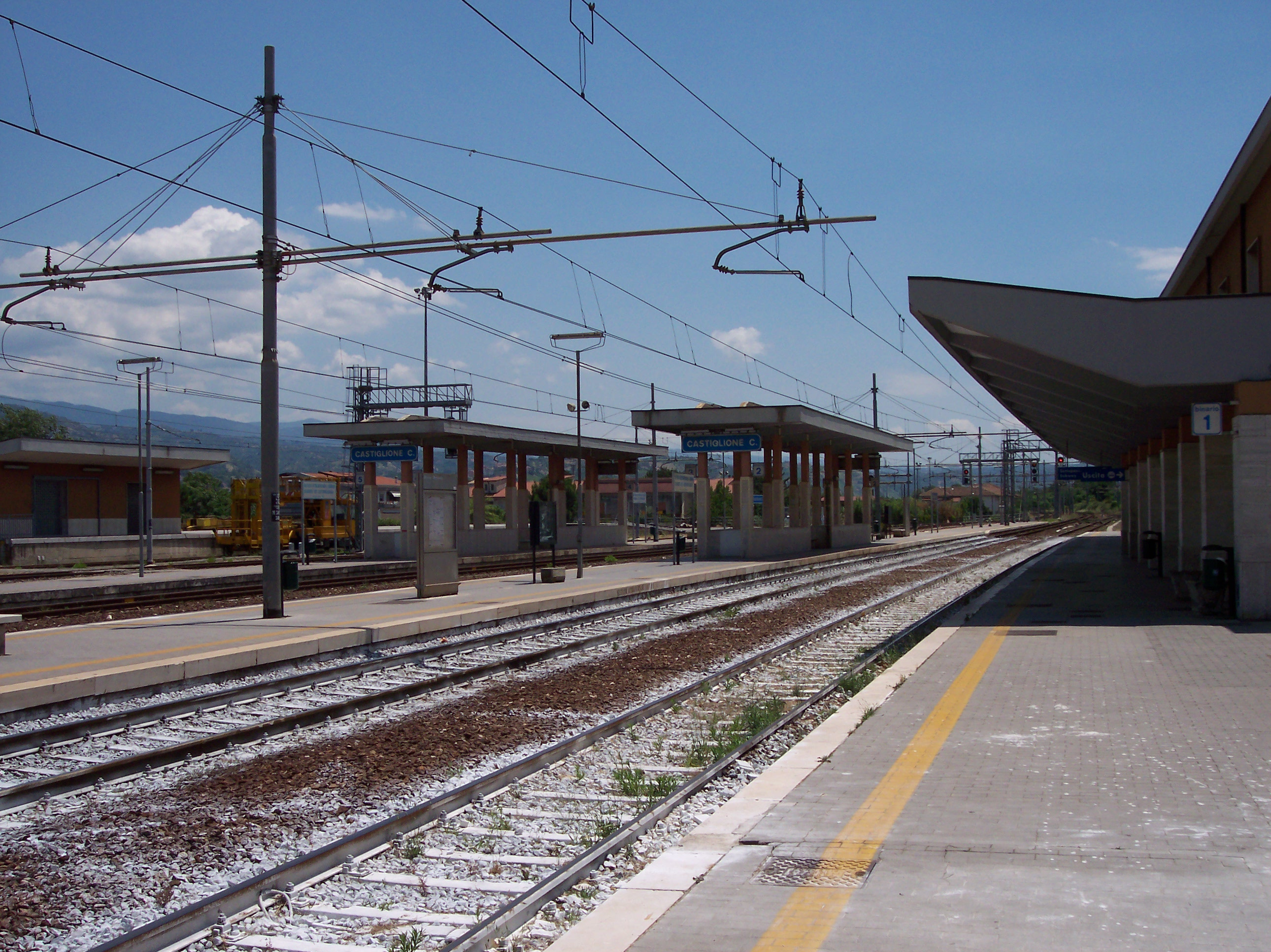
Castiglione Cosentino station

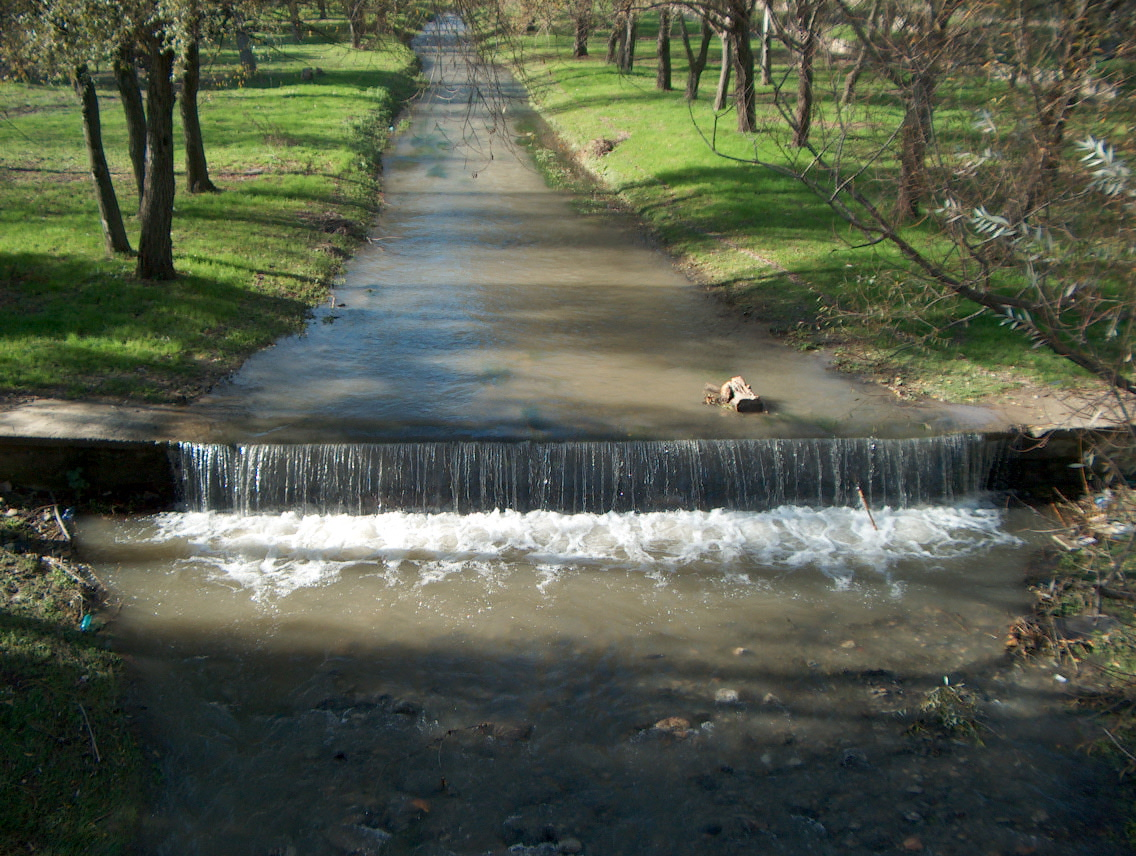
Emoli river near Quattromiglia

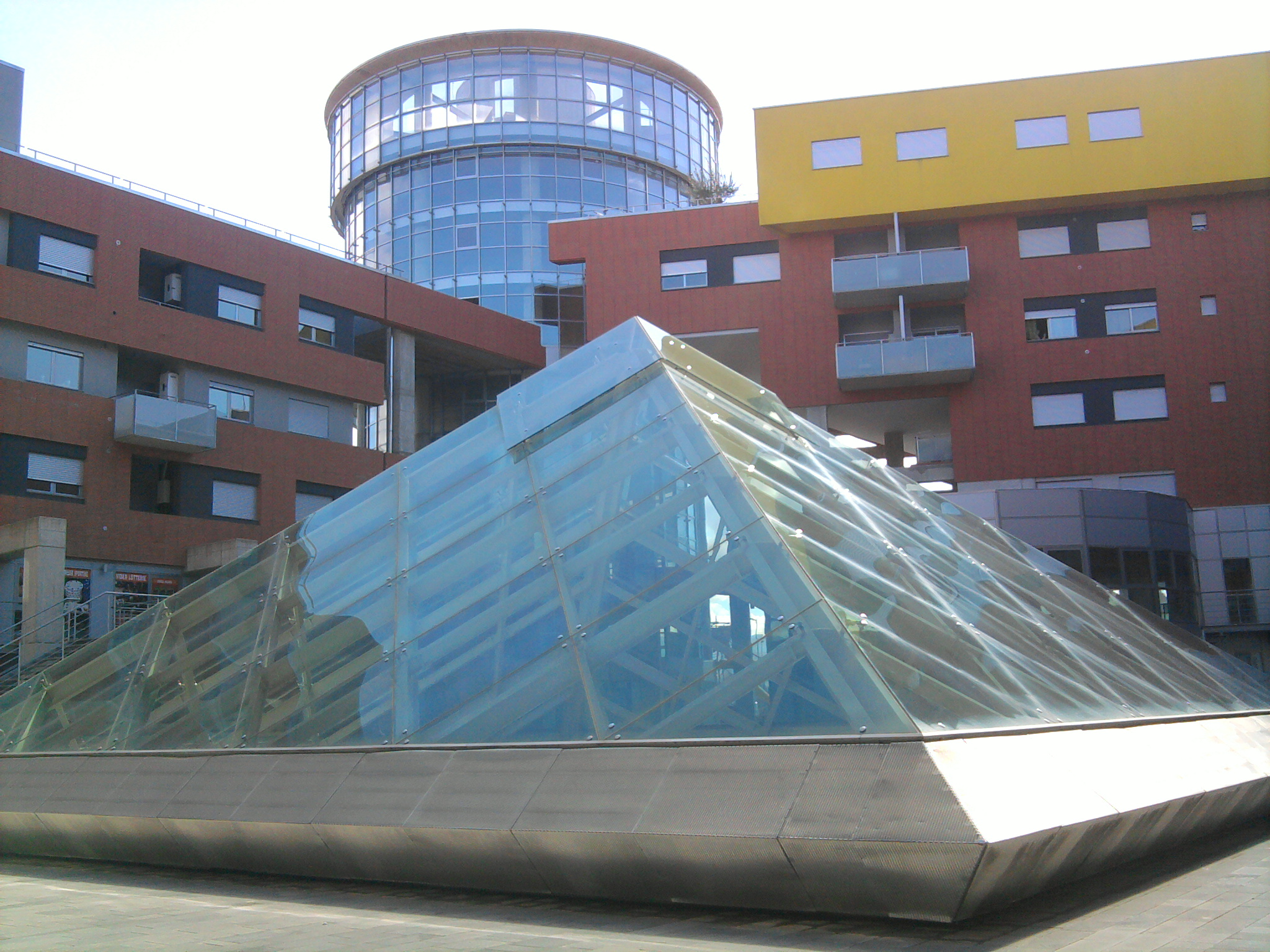
Pyramid of the Marconi Shopping Center
