= Alessandro Carrera =

Italian poet and translator (born 1954)

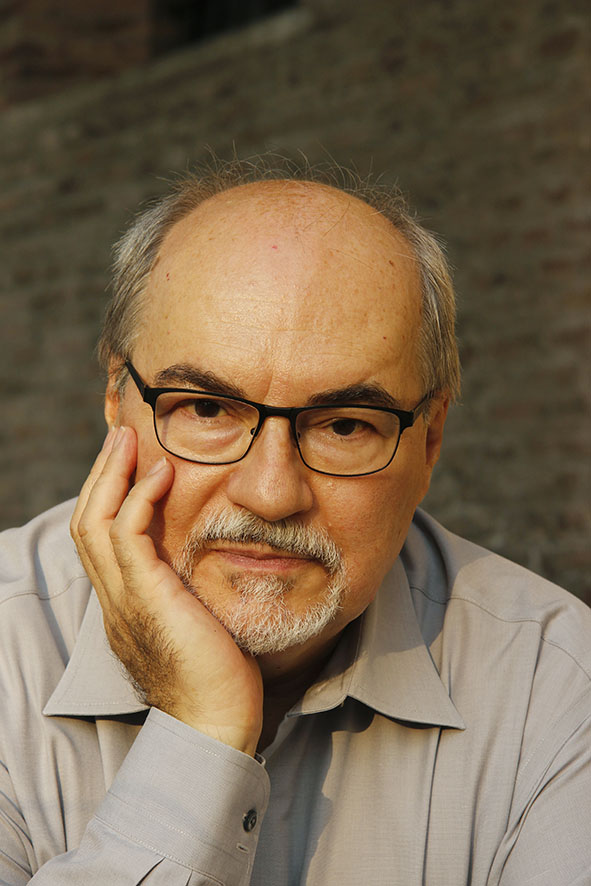
Alessandro Carrera (2017)

Alessandro Carrera (born 1954 in Lodi, Lombardy) is an Italian poet, writer, essayist, translator. and songwriter. Since 2001, he teaches Italian and comparative Literature and Cinema at the [University of Houston]. Since September 2024, he is Chair of the Department of Modern and Classical Languages. He has published poems, short stories, novels, and books and essays on literature, philosophy, music, cinema, the arts, and current events. Since 2019, he is editor-in-chief of «Gradiva. International Journal of Italian Poetry» (Olschki, Firenze) GRADIVA | Casa editrice Leo S. Olschki

== Biography ==
Alessandro Carrera was born in Lodi, Lombardy, Italy in 1954. In 1980, he received his Laurea in Theoretical Philosophy at the University of Milan. with a dissertation on the aesthetics of music in Arnold Schoenberg. At the same time, he worked for the independent record label L’Orchestra and performed as a singer-songwriter.

He began his music career in 1975, with compositions close to the politicized style of the time. With Giorgio Lo Cascio and Mario De Luigi, he realized Punto A Capo (1978, Vinyl) - Discogs (Divergo, 1978), an album on the tenth anniversary of the 1968 uprisings. In the same year, he participated in the Tübingen Folk Festival, in Germany, and in the Club Tenco Sanremo Club Tenco - Premio Tenco - Home | Facebook with the show Punto a capo (based on the album).

He wrote songs for Moni Ovadia’s ensemble, and published his album Alessandro Carrera Le Cartoline (1981, Vinyl) - Discogs (1981). From 1982 to 1987, Carrera worked as a high school teacher and managing editor of popular science magazines at Edizioni Riza and Edizioni Natura.

In 1987, he moved to the United States as a teacher of Italian (Lettore d’italiano), a position sponsored by the Ministry of Foreign Affairs (Italy). He taught Italian Language and Literature at the University of Houston (1987-1991) and at McMaster University in Hamilton, Ontario (1992-1994). From 1995 to 2001, he taught at New York University and organized literary events on behalf of the Italian Cultural Institute in New York.

In 2001, the University of Houston hired him as Director of Italian Studies. In 2010, he became Director of the Graduate Program in World Cultures and Literatures. In 2014, a selection of his poems was included in the anthology Poets of the Italian Diaspora with an introduction by Peter Carravetta. In 2016, he received a Ph.D. for Publications in Music, Media, and Humanities from the University of Huddersfield. In 2018, Carrera was awarded the Moores Professorship - University of Houston at the University of Houston. He is also Visiting Professor at Università IULM IULM University of Milan (Master in Music Publishing and Production) and Università degli Studi di Brescia University of Brescia

== Translation and Editorial Work ==
In addition to his production as scholar, poet, and novelist, Carrera has also carried out an important activity as a translator and after 2000 has focused his music writing on Italian and American popular music. As a scholar of the Dylan phenomenon and author of La voce di Bob Dylan (Bob Dylan’s Voice, Feltrinelli, 2001, 2011, 2021), Carrera has been one of the keynote speakers at the first international Bob Dylan conference (“Highway 61 Revisited: Dylan’s Road from Minnesota to the World.” March 25-27, 2007, Weisman Art Museum at the University of Minnesota, Minneapolis, MN) MUSIC SYMPOSIUM : Highway 61 Revisited - Dylan's road from Minnesota to the world - and is in the editorial board of The Dylan Review. For Feltrinelli publisher, he has translated into Italian and annotated all Dylan’s songs and prose works. He has also translated the poems of Allen Mandelbaum, Andy Warhol’s Popism and six novels of Graham Greene. With Thomas Simpson, he has edited an anthology of American poems inspired by Italy La luce migliore. Poeti americani in Italia - Medusa & Mc Edizioni As a scholar of contemporary Italian philosophy, Carrera has edited the English edition of works by Massimo Cacciari, Emanuele Severino, and Carlo Sini . Since 2019, he is editor-in-chief of Gradiva. International Journal of Italian Poetry GRADIVA Casa editrice Leo S. Olschki.

== Bibliography in English ==
- The perfect bride / La sposa perfetta, revised and expanded edition, in Fuoricasa 6, Castel Maggiore, Book, 1997, ISBN 88-7232-251-0
- Love of the century / L'amore del secolo in Fuoricollana 5, Castel Maggiore, Book, 2000, ISBN 88-7232-346-0
- Alessandro Carrera and Alessandro Vettori, Binding the Lands: Present Day Poets, Present Day Poetry, Fiesole, Cadmo, 2004, ISBN 88-7923-317-3
- Italian Critical Theory. Special issue, Volume 29 (2011) – Annali d’italianistica, ISSN 0741-7527
- Music and Society in Italy. Special issue, Forum Italicum - Volume 49, Number 2, Aug 01, 2015 ISSN 0014-5858 print, 2168-989X online
- Fellini’s Eternal Rome: Paganism and Christianity in the Films of Federico Fellini, London UK, Bloomsbury, 2019, ISBN 978-1-4742-9761-5
- Songs of Purgatory, Mount Sinai, NY, Gradiva Publications, 2020, ISBN 1-892021-77-3
- Maria Anita Stefanelli, Alessandro Carrera, Fabio Fantuzzi, Bob Dylan and the Arts: Songs, Film, Painting, and Sculpture in Bob Dylan’s Universe, Roma, Edizioni di Storia e Letteratura, 2021, ISBN 978-88-9359-397-7

== Discography ==
Album

- 1978: Punto e a capo (Divergo, 5335 519; with Giorgio Lo Cascio and Mario De Luigi)
- 1981: Le cartoline (L'Orchestra, OLPS 55012)

Singles

- 1981: Piazza S. Ambrogio/Aznavour (L'Orchestra, OLPN 802)

Streaming

- 2020: Songs of Purgatory, 16 songs in streaming at Gradiva publications

== See also ==
- Peter Carravetta
