= Castiglione Cosentino =

- Comune
- Comune di Castiglione Cosentino
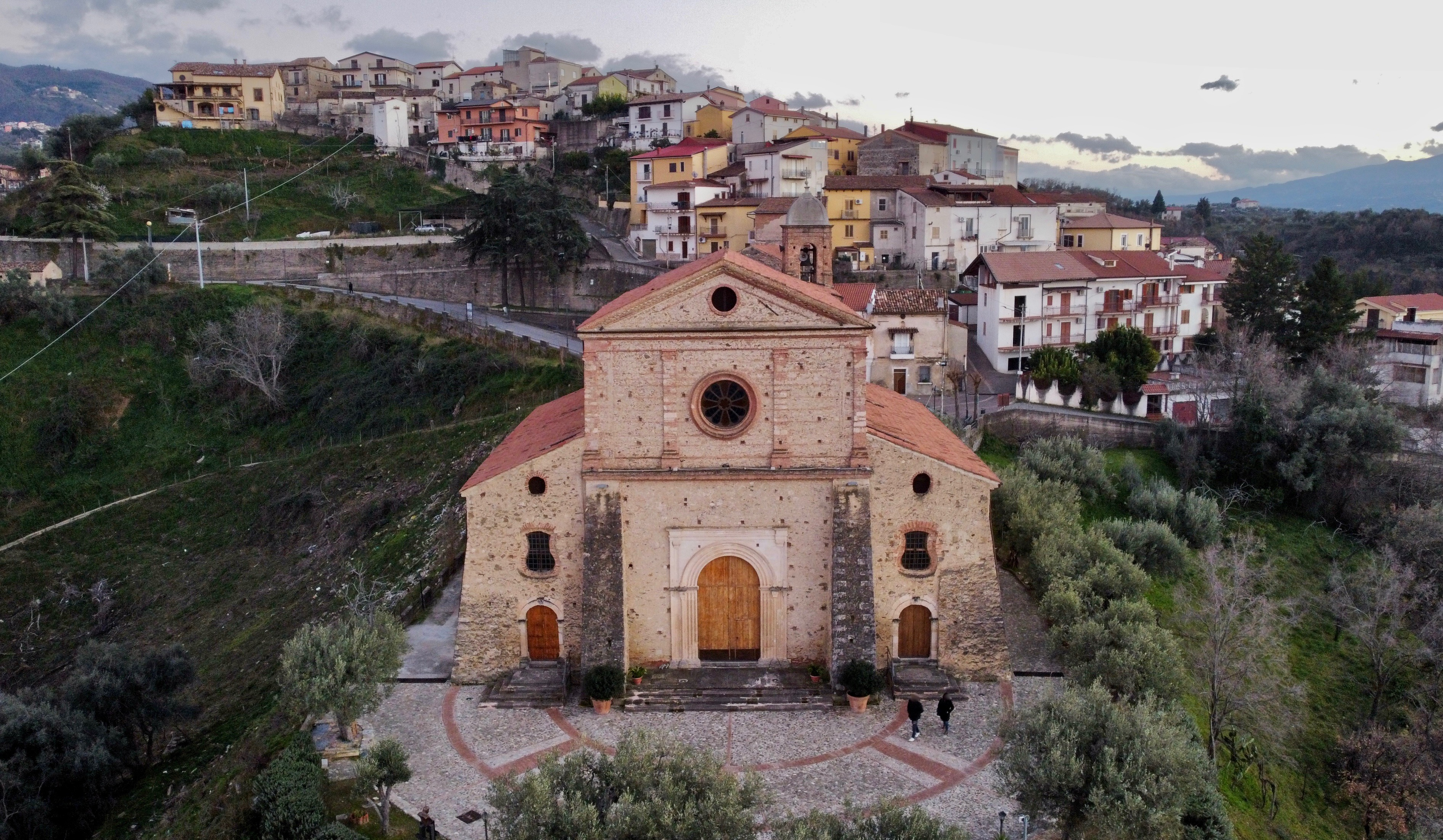

- Castiglione within the Province of Cosenza

- Location within Italy Location within Calabria
- Coordinates: 39°21′N 16°17′E
- Country: Italy
- Region: Calabria
- Province: Cosenza (CS)
- Frazioni: Filari, Orbo, Pristini, Quolata, San Biagio, Santa Lucia, Valle La Fontana, Volata

Government
  - Mayor: Salvatore Magarò (since May 2019)

Area
  - Total: 14.09 km^{2} (5.44 sq mi)
- Elevation: 350 m (1,150 ft)

Population (2024)
  - Total: 2,695
  - Density: 191.3/km^{2} (495.4/sq mi)
- Time zone: UTC+1 (CET)
  - Summer (DST): UTC+2 (CEST)
- Postal code: 87040
- Dialing code: 0984
- Website: Official website

Castiglione Cosentino is a town and comune in the province of Cosenza in the Calabria region of southern Italy.

== Geography ==
Located in the north of the suburban area of Cosenza, Castiglione borders with the municipalities of Rende, Rose and San Pietro in Guarano. It counts the hamlets (frazioni) of Capitano, Canterame, Orbo, Parulli, Pristini, Qualata, San Biagio, Spina, Santa Lucia, Valle La Fontana, Zerti, and Volata.

== Transport ==
The railway station, part of the Paola-Cosenza line, is located in Quattromiglia, a hamlet of Rende.
