= Domenico Saccà =

Italian computer scientist

- Born: Italy
- Known for: Database theory; founder of SEBD (Symposium on Advanced Database Systems)
- Scientific career
- Fields: Computer science
- Workplaces: University of Calabria

Domenico Saccà is an Italian computer scientist, professor emeritus of Computer Engineering at the University of Calabria. He is known for his research in database theory and for founding the annual conference SEBD (Symposium on Advanced Database Systems) in 1993, serving as coordinator of its steering committee until 2021, after which he became emeritus member.

== Career ==
Saccà was appointed full professor of Computer Engineering at the University of Calabria in 1987, a position he held until 2021. In January 2017, he was appointed Pro-Rector of the University of Calabria.

From 1989 to 1993, within the framework of the CNR Finalized Project “Information Systems and Parallel Computing”, coordinated by prof. Bruno Fadini, he was the National Coordinator of Subproject 5 “Advanced Database Systems”. From 1997 to 2000, Saccà served as Coordinator of the Logic-Based Databases area within the ESPRIT Compulog Net Network of Excellence, a European research initiative. From 2002 to 2008, he served as the first Director of ICAR-CNR, the Institute for High Performance Computing and Networking of the Italian National Research Council (CNR). He also served as President of the ICT-SUD Competence Center, an Italian consortium for research and innovation in information technologies.

He retired in 2021 and was described in the press as a "dean of the University of Calabria" and one of the founders of informatics in Southern Italy.

== Research ==
Saccà's research covers theoretical and applied aspects of databases, logic programming, data mining, and more recently, blockchain and cybersecurity. He has authored highly cited papers in the leading journals of computer science, including the Journal of the ACM (JACM), ACM Transactions on Database Systems (TODS), ACM Transactions on Knowledge Discovery from Data (TKDD), the VLDB Journal, IEEE Transactions on Knowledge and Data Engineering (TKDE), IEEE Transactions on Dependable and Secure Computing (TDSC), IEEE Transactions on Software Engineering (TSE), the SIAM Journal on Computing, Journal of Computer and System Sciences (JCSS), Theoretical Computer Science, and Data Mining and Knowledge Discovery (DMKD).

Notably, he is among the few Italian computer scientists to have published twice in the Journal of the ACM, both papers in the field of database theory. Beyond database theory, his research has also covered database design, Datalog logic programming, data mining and security, including influential contributions on database partitioning, recursive Datalog queries, non-determinism in Datalog programs, process mining and privacy/security with PUF-based authentication.

== Community leadership ==
In 1981, Saccà was among the organizers of the Advanced Seminar on Theoretical Issues in Databases (TIDB), held in Cetraro, Italy, considered a precursor to the international ICDT conference.

In 1993 he founded SEBD, the annual Symposium on Advanced Database Systems, the major conference of the Italian database research community, and coordinated its steering committee until 2021. He also co-organized the 2021 SEBD panel Past and Future of Computer Science Theory, featuring leading figures in the field.

== Recognition ==
Saccà was elected Senior Member of the Association for Computing Machinery (ACM) in 2007. In 2014, he was an invited keynote speaker at the OTM Conferences, delivering a talk on Big Data and information value on the Web. In 2019, Saccà co-presented a tutorial at the IEEE Big Data Conference in Los Angeles on approaches for profitable social network analysis. Regional and cultural media have profiled his work and contributions to the Italian scientific community.
