= Rovito =

- Comune
- Comune di Rovito
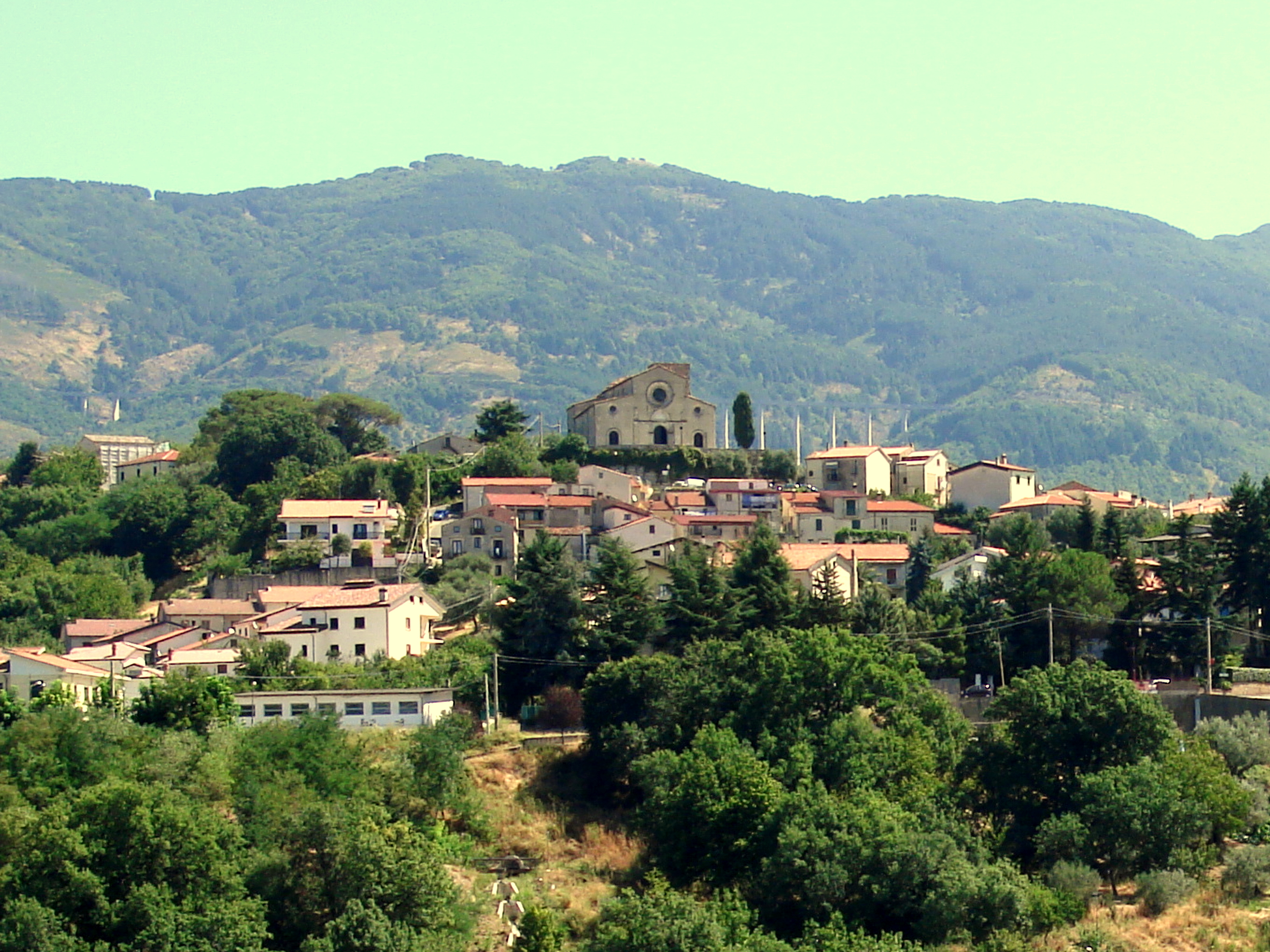

- Location within Italy Location within Calabria
- Coordinates: 39°18′32.76″N 16°19′12.36″E
- Country: Italy
- Region: Calabria
- Province: Cosenza (CS)
- Frazioni: Bosco

Government
  - Mayor: Felice D'Alessandro

Area
  - Total: 10.68 km^{2} (4.12 sq mi)
- Elevation: 740 m (2,430 ft)

Population (30 April 2017)
  - Total: 3,137
  - Density: 293.7/km^{2} (760.7/sq mi)
- Demonym: Rovitesi
- Time zone: UTC+1 (CET)
  - Summer (DST): UTC+2 (CEST)
- Postal code: 87050
- Dialing code: 0984
- Patron saint: Saint Barbara
- Website: Official website

Rovito (Calabrian: Ruvìtu) is a town and comune in the province of Cosenza in the Calabria region of southern Italy.

== Geography ==
The town is located in the western suburb of Cosenza, near the Sila mountain range. It borders with the municipalities of Casali del Manco, Celico, Cosenza, Lappano, San Pietro in Guarano and Zumpano. It counts the hamlet (frazione) of Bosco, a little village south of Cosenza.
