= San Vincenzo La Costa =

- Comune
- Comune di San Vincenzo La Costa
- Location within Italy Location within Calabria
- Coordinates: 39°22′N 16°9′E
- Country: Italy
- Region: Calabria
- Province: Cosenza (CS)
- Frazioni: San Sisto dei Valdesi, Gesuiti

Government
  - Mayor: Gregorio Iannotta

Area
  - Total: 18.42 km^{2} (7.11 sq mi)
- Elevation: 493 m (1,617 ft)

Population (31 July 2018)
  - Total: 2,164
  - Density: 117.5/km^{2} (304.3/sq mi)
- Demonym: Sanvincenzesi
- Time zone: UTC+1 (CET)
  - Summer (DST): UTC+2 (CEST)
- Postal code: 87030
- Dialing code: 0984
- Website: Official website

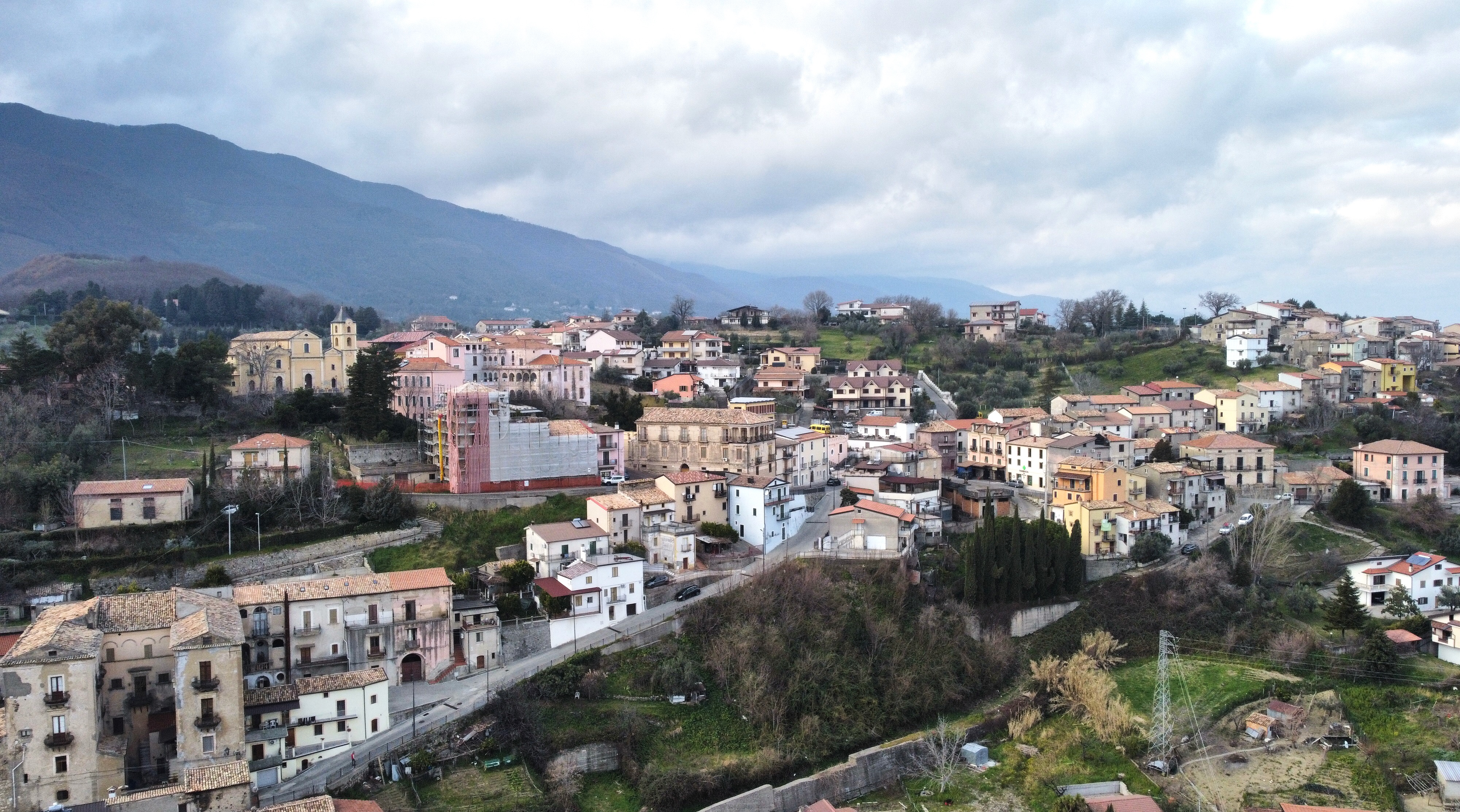

San Vincenzo La Costa is a town and comune in the province of Cosenza in the Calabria region of southern Italy.

== Geography ==
San Vincenzo La Costa is a small town made up of villages including San Vincenzo, Gesuiti, Giuranda, Greco, Pallazello. The town is bordered by Montalto Uffugo, Rende and San Fili. It is largely composed of residents who rely on farming existence and finding employment towards larger cities such as nearby Cosenza.
