= Rende =

Rende Griko: Aríntha
- Comune
- Comune di Rende
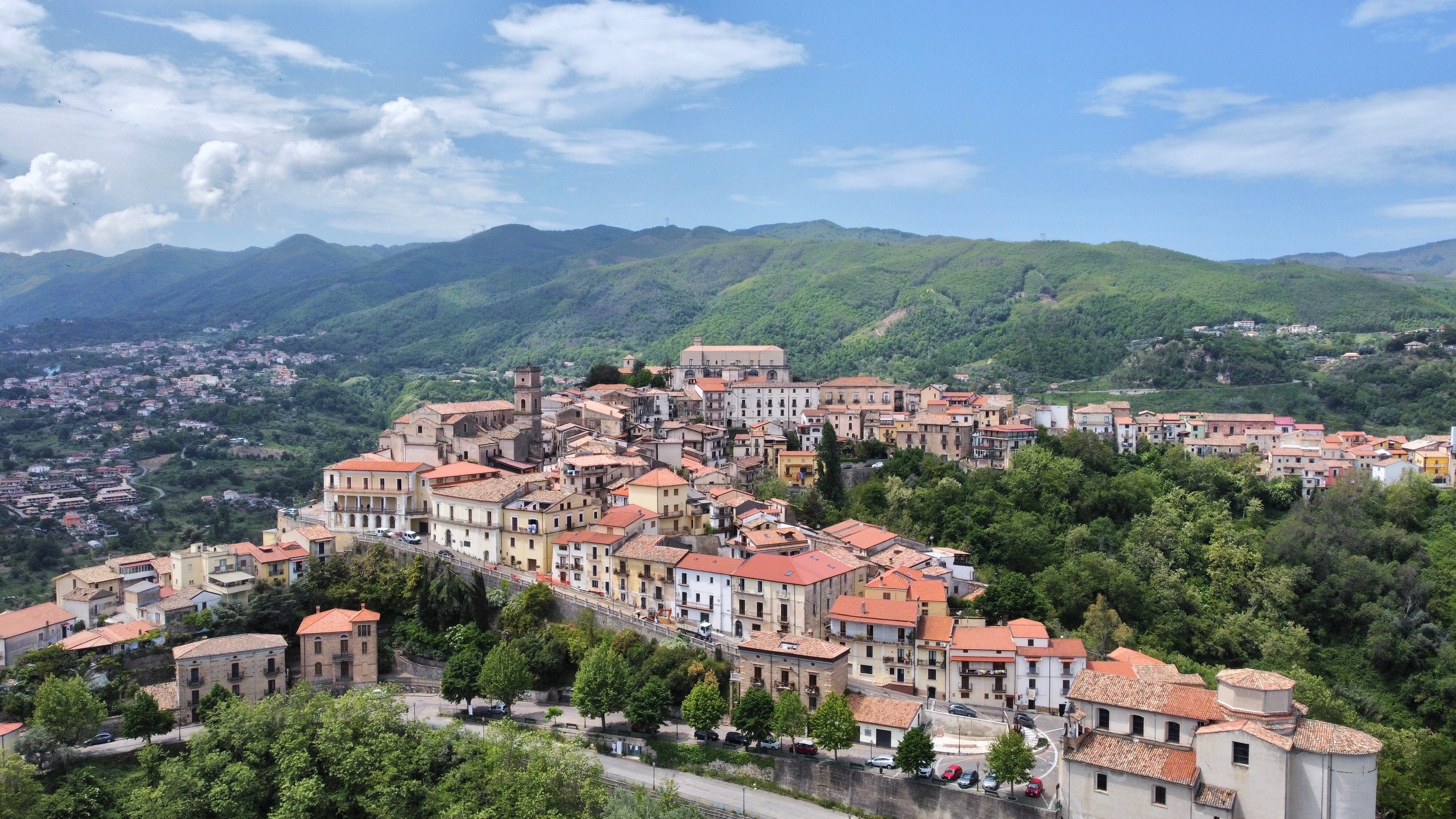

- Rende within the Province of Cosenza

- Location within Italy Location within Calabria
- Coordinates: 39°20′N 16°11′E
- Country: Italy
- Region: Calabria
- Province: Cosenza (CS)
- Frazioni: Arcavacata, Commenda, Quattromiglia, Roges, Santo Stefano, Saporito, Surdo

Government
  - Mayor: Sandro Principe (PSI)

Area
  - Total: 54 km^{2} (21 sq mi)
- Elevation: 480 m (1,570 ft)

Population (2025)
  - Total: 36,918
  - Density: 680/km^{2} (1,800/sq mi)
- Demonym: Rendesi
- Time zone: UTC+1 (CET)
  - Summer (DST): UTC+2 (CEST)
- Postal code: 87036
- Dialing code: 0984
- Patron saint: Immaculate Conception
- Saint day: 20 February
- Website: Official website

Rende is a comune (municipality) in the province of Cosenza, Calabria, Italy, home to the headquarters of the University of Calabria. It has a population of about 36,000.

Historical population
Year	Pop.	±%
1861	3,648	—
1871	5,286	+44.9%
1881	5,239	−0.9%
1901	7,106	+35.6%
1911	7,522	+5.9%
1921	8,006	+6.4%
1931	9,038	+12.9%
1936	9,583	+6.0%
1951	11,729	+22.4%
1961	11,770	+0.3%
1971	13,157	+11.8%
1981	25,281	+92.1%
1991	30,946	+22.4%
2001	34,421	+11.2%
2011	33,555	−2.5%
2021	36,123	+7.7%
Source: ISTAT

The city is divided into two parts: the old town, on a high hill, and the modern area, on level ground, which is fully connected to the city of Cosenza and central to the cultural and economic life of the urban area.

== Geography ==
Rende stretches from the left river of the Crati to the mountains called "Serre Cosentine".

- Southern borders: Cosenza, Castrolibero, Marano Marchesato and Marano Principato.
- Northern borders: Montalto Uffugo and San Vincenzo La Costa.
- Western borders: San Fili.
- Eastern borders: Castiglione Cosentino, Rose, San Pietro in Guarano and Zumpano.

The municipality counts the hamlets (frazioni) of Arcavacata, Commenda, Quattromiglia, Roges, Santo Stefano, Saporito and Surdo.

The territory presents mountain areas from west that degrade slowly eastward forming hills, one of which is the historic centre, until the valley of the Crati. Thanks to large flat areas, it is covered by the modern city. The most important rivers crossing Rende are Crati, Campagnano, Surdo and Emoli.

== History ==
The Oenotrians founded here a town named Acheruntia and, later, Pandosia. However, several inhabitants later moved to a more defendable area, corresponding to the modern frazione of Nogiano, founding (c. 520 BC) the new settlement of Aruntia, later, Arintha. This is mentioned by the ancient Greek historian Hecataeus of Miletus as a Bruttian town of Oenotrian origins.

During Roman times, the town followed the history of the nearby Cosentia. After a long resistance, it was sacked by Totila's troops in 547, during the Gothic Wars. In the 8th-10th centuries, it was sometimes attacked by Saracen troops, until part of the population moved in what is now the territory of Castiglione Cosentino. Later it was controlled by the Normans and subsequently other southern Italian (sometimes of foreign origin) dynasties.

== Main sights ==
- Norman Castle, built in 1095 by Bohemond I of Antioch.
- Mother church of Santa Maria Maggiore, built around 12th century but rebuilt several times, the last in the late 18th century
- Sanctuary of Our Lady of Costantinopoli.
- Church of Saint Michael, “del ritiro”
- Church of Our Lady of the Rosary
- Civic Museum of Zagarese’s Palace.
- Church of Saint Francis and Our Lady of Grace.
- Church of Our Lady of Consolation, in Arcavacata.
- Other important palace and little churches in the historical center.

== Municipal government ==
Rende is headed by a mayor (sindaco) assisted by a legislative body, the consiglio comunale, and an executive body, the giunta comunale. Since 1994 the mayor and members of the consiglio comunale are directly elected together by resident citizens, while from 1946 to 1993 the mayor was chosen by the legislative body. The giunta comunale is chaired by the mayor, who appoints others members, called assessori. The offices of the comune are housed in a building usually called the municipio or palazzo comunale.

Since 1993, the mayor of Rende is directly elected by citizens, originally every four, then every five years.

Mayor	Term start	Term end	Party
Gaspare Rovella	1946	1948	PSI
Salvatore Chiappetta	1948	1951	PSI
Francesco Settino	1951	1952	PSI
Francesco Principe	1952	1980	PSI
Sandro Principe	1980	1987	PSI
Mario Portone	1987	1988	PSI
Raffaele De Rango	1988	1990	PSI
Antonietta Feola	1990	1993	PSI
Francesco Casciaro	6 December 1993	28 June 1999	PSI
Sandro Principe	28 June 1999	30 May 2006	SDI
Umberto Bernaudo	30 May 2006	31 May 2011	SDI
Vittorio Cavalcanti	31 May 2011	3 July 2013 (Note: Resigned.)	PD
Special Prefectural Commissioner (3 July 2013 – 10 June 2014)
Marcello Manna	10 June 2014	28 June 2023	Ind (Note: Centre-right independent.)
Special Prefectural Commission (28 June 2023 – 26 May 2025) (Note: Municipal administration dissolved by the national government due to mafia association.)
Sandro Principe	26 May 2025	Incumbent	PSI

== Economy ==
The economy of Rende is mostly based on the University of Calabria. In comparison to the rest of southern Italy, Rende has quite a strong economy and is therefore in full expansion. While full industrialization has not yet been very successful, in recent times, major companies have established offices in Rende. Among these are the Japanese Digital and Data Innovation company NTT Data, which has a Research and Development office in Rende; and JRS Silvateam Food Ingredients.

== Sports ==
Rende is home to the football team Rende Calcio, which competes in the official semi-professional tournament (C2).

== Gallery ==
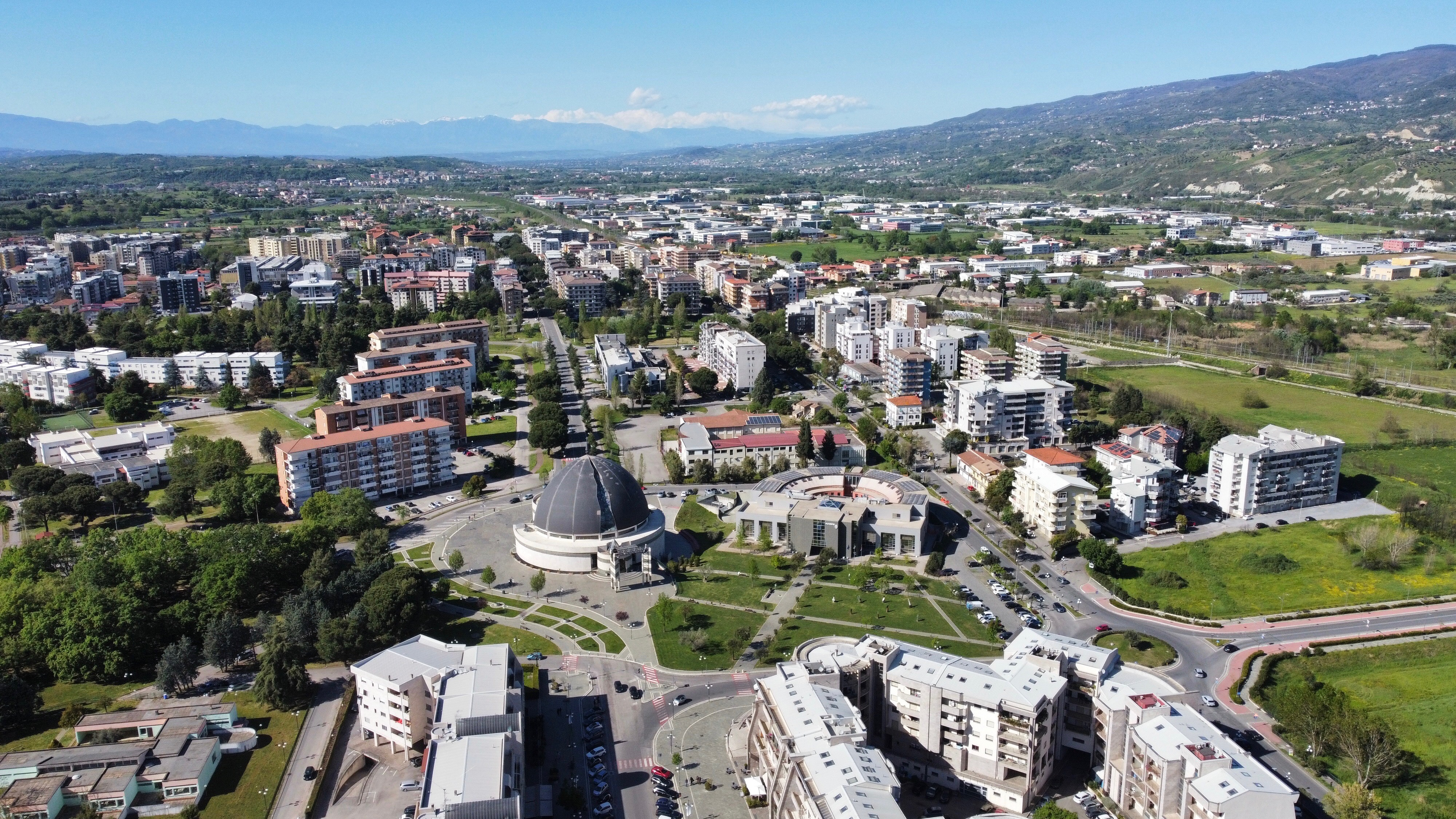

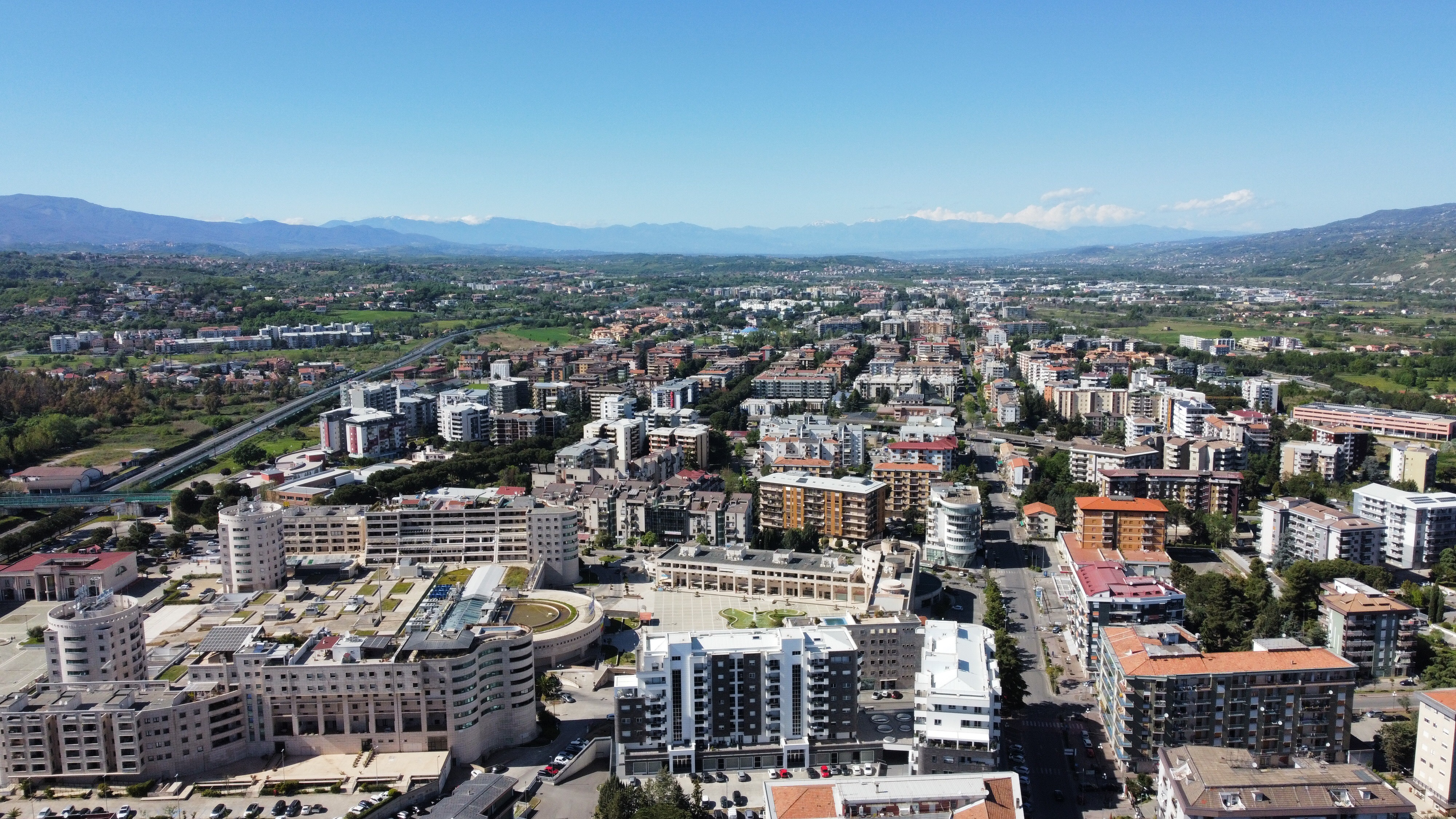

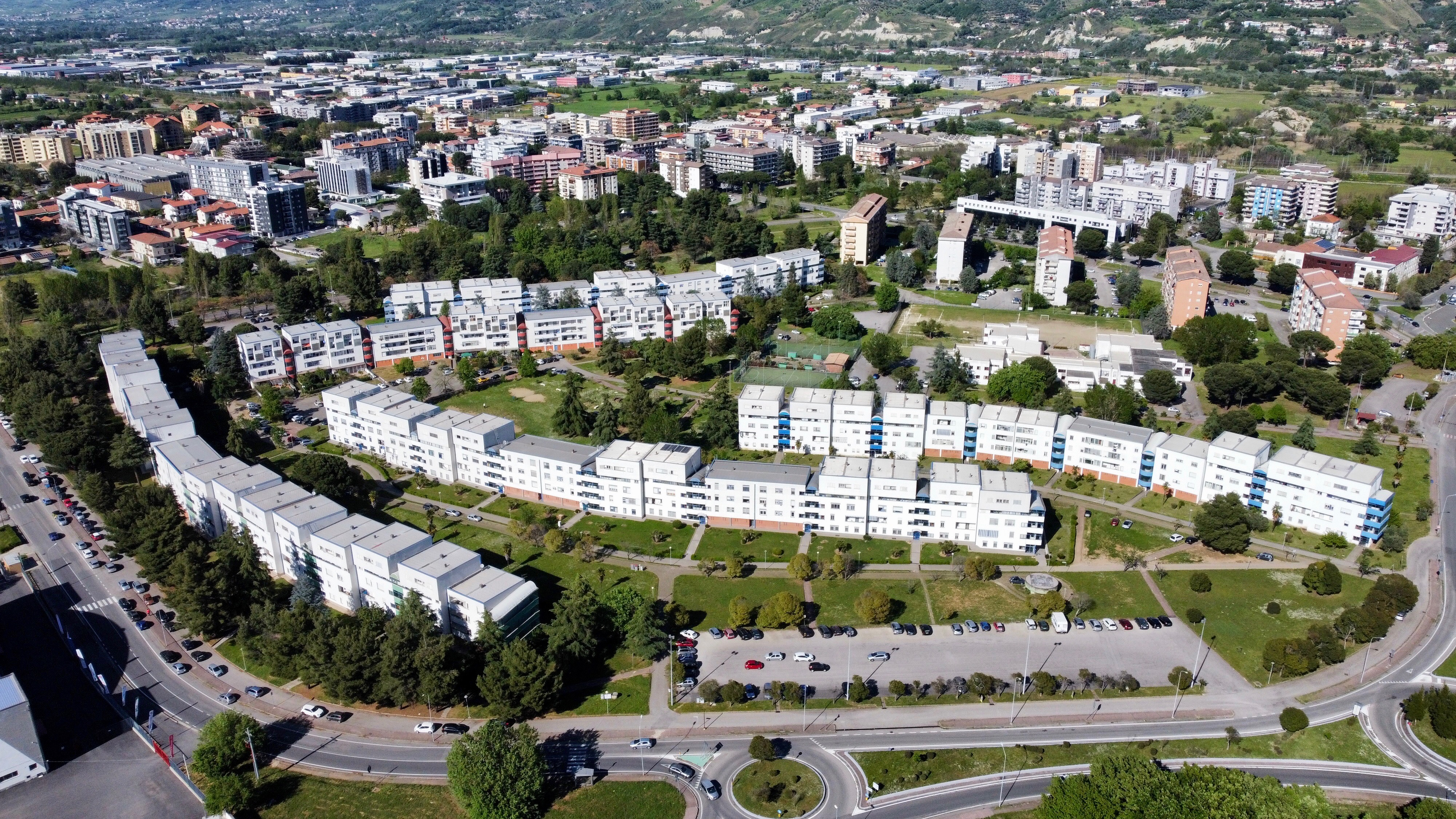

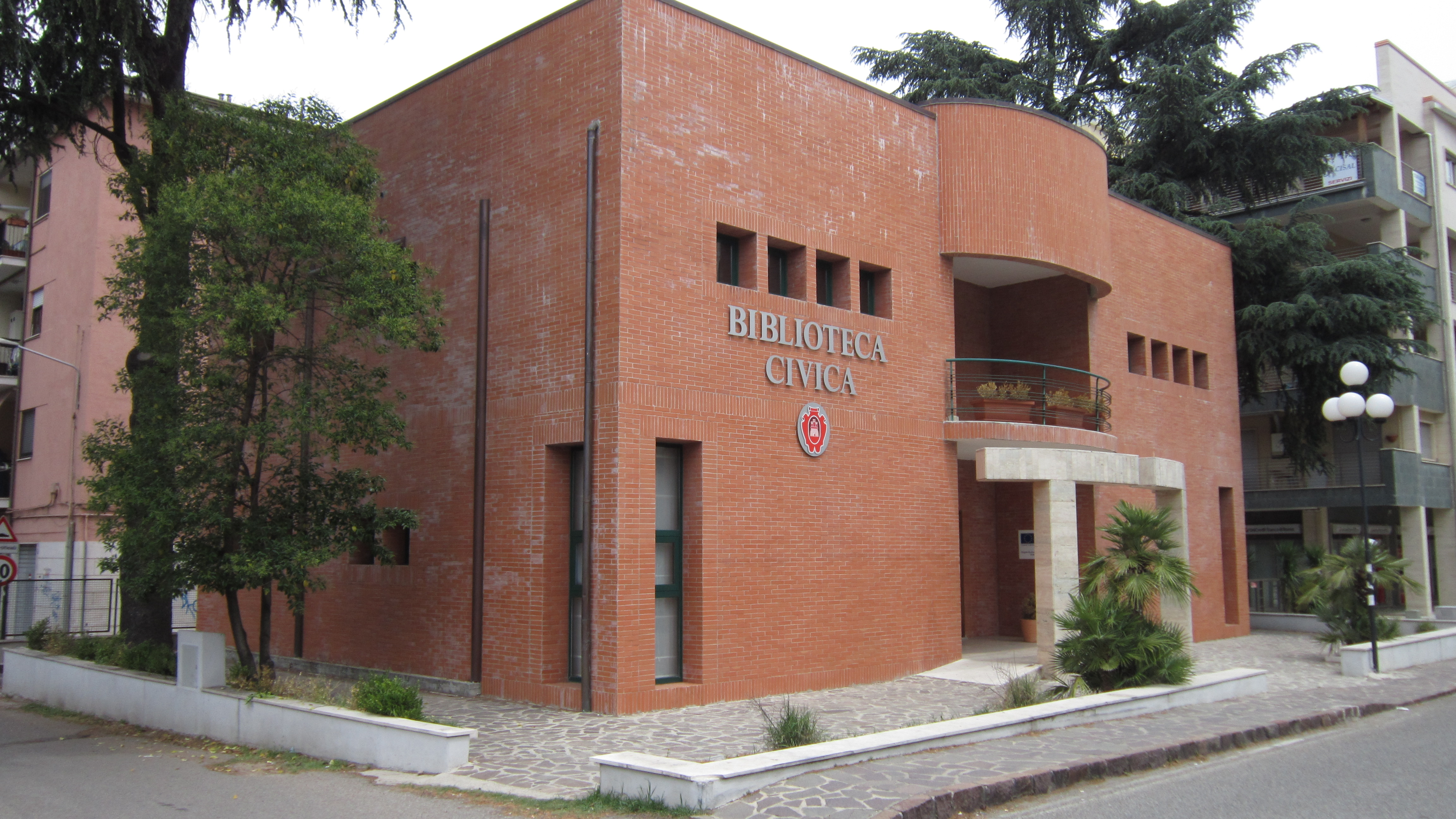
Public Library

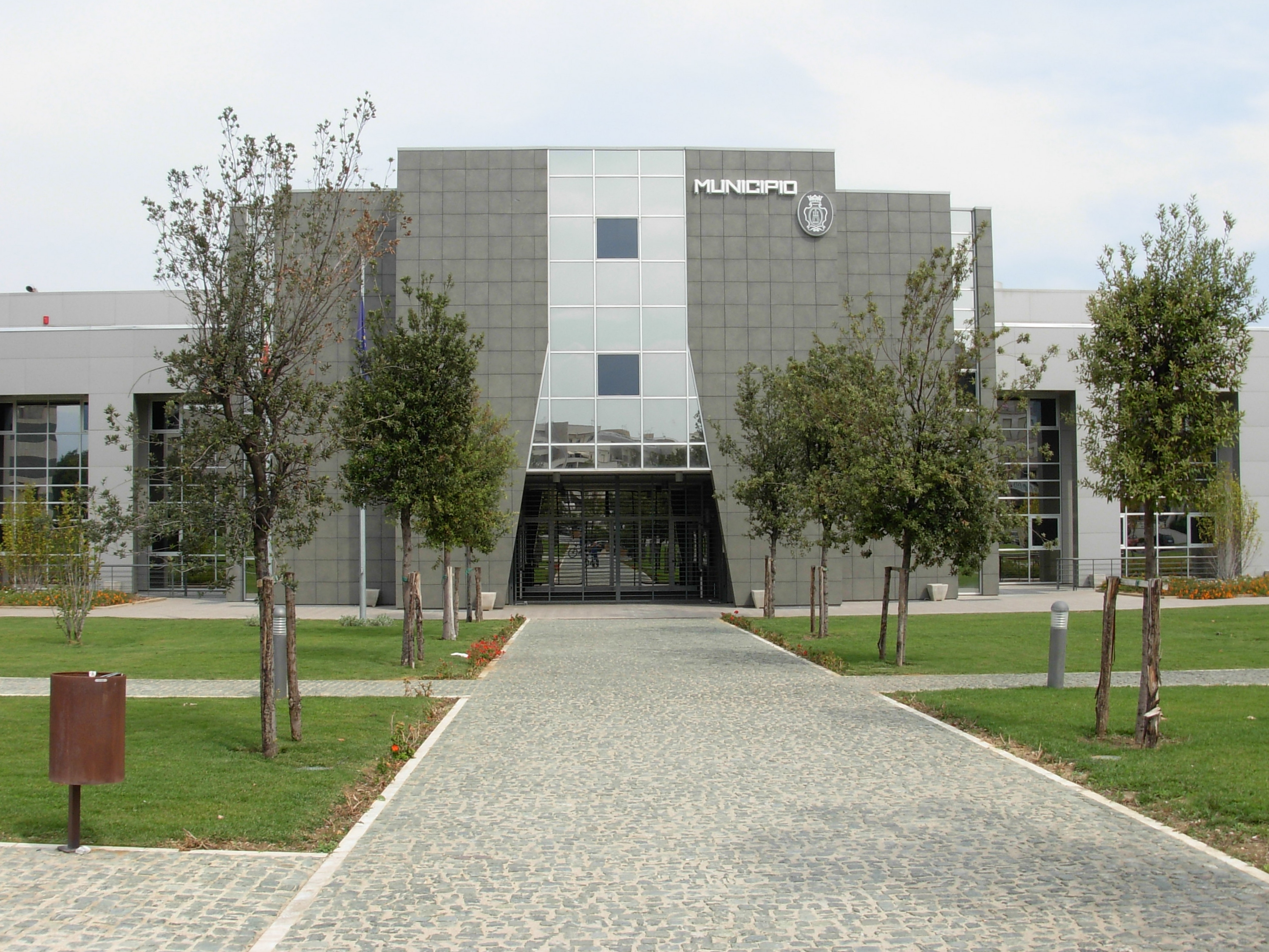
The Town Hall

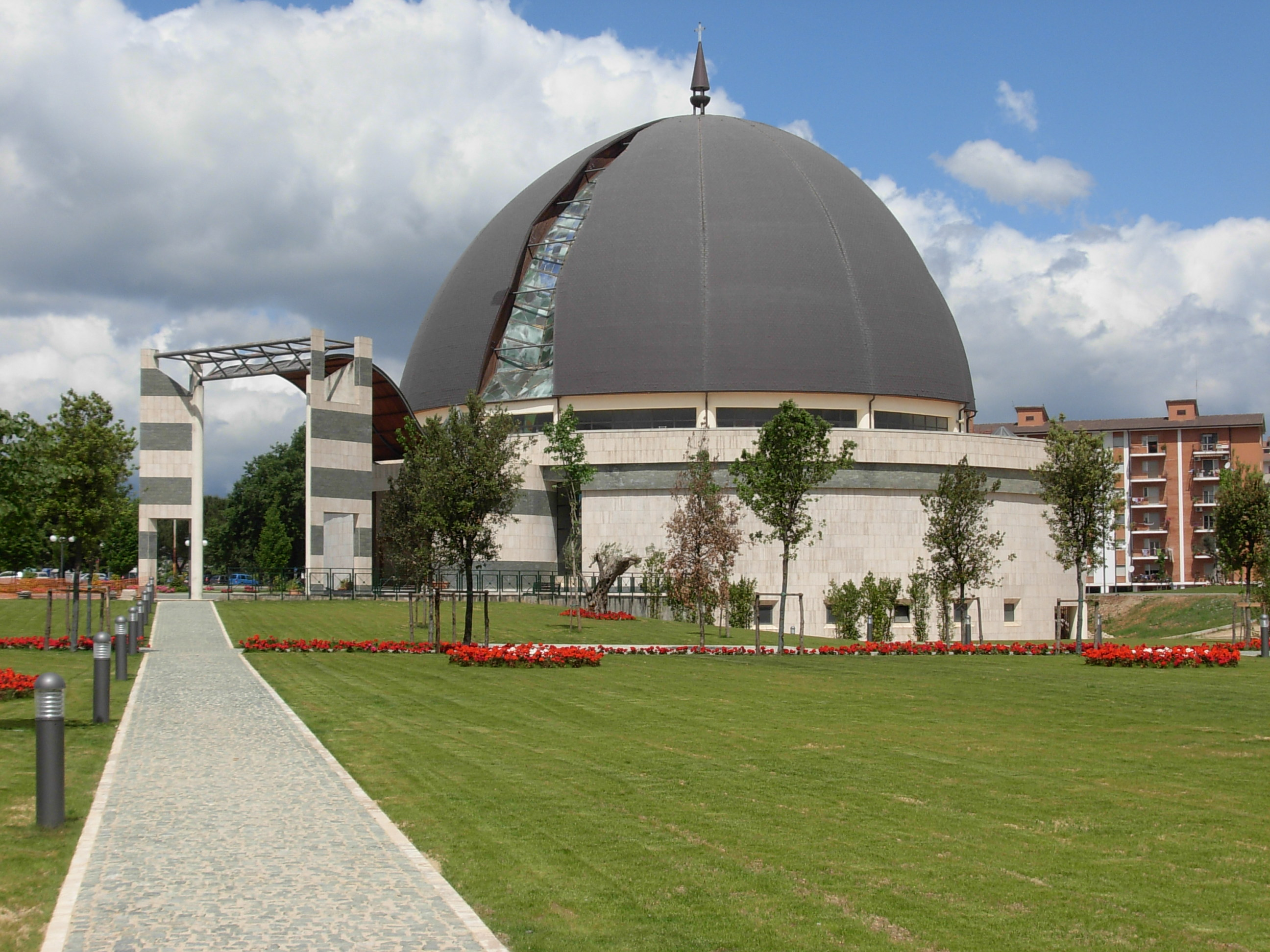
Saint Charles' Church

== Sources ==
- Fonte, Fedele (1976). Rende nella sua cronistoria (in Italian). Chiaravalle Centrale: Frama Sud.
- Miceli di Serradileo, Amedeo (2013). Il partito angioino a Cosenza e le sue vicende tra la guerra dei baroni di Ferrante I ed il regno di Carlo V attraverso i documenti dell'Archivio di Stato di Cosenza, in "Archivio Storico per le province napoletane (in Italian). Napoli: Società Napoletana di Storia Patria.
- Giraldi, Gerardo (1991). Rende: Usanze, tradizioni, costumi (in Italian). Rende: Amministrazione Comunale di Rende.
- Giraldi, Gerardo (2004). Le chiese di Rende (in Italian). Amministrazione Comunale di Rende. Alternate 1990 2nd edition OCLC 878860087
- Giraldi, Riccardo (2003). Il popolo cosentino e il suo territorio (in Italian). Cosenza: Pellegrini.
- Settia, Aldo Angelo (2002). Rapine, assedi, battaglie. La guerra nel medioevo (in Italian). Rome, Bari: Gius. Laterza & Figli S.p.A.
