= Peter Carravetta =

Italian philosopher, poet, literary theorist and translator (born 1951)

- Born: Peter Carravetta; 10 May 1951 (age 75); Lappano, Italy

Education
- Education: New York University

Philosophical work
- Era: 21st-century philosophy
- Region: Western philosophy
- School: Continental philosophy Hermeneutics
- Main interests: Literary theory

Peter Carravetta (born 10 May 1951 in Lappano) is an Italian philosopher, poet, literary theorist and translator.

== Works ==
- The Elusive Hermes. Method, Discourse, Interpreting (Davies Group Publishing, 2013)
- Existenz (Adams Press, 1976)
- delle voci (Anterem, 1980)
- The Sun and Other Things (Guernica, 1998)
- Linfinito (Campanotto, 2013)
- (2012) Weak Thought, Gianni Vattimo, Translated by Peter Carravetta, SUNY series in Contemporary Italian Philosophy, 2012 Translation of Il pensiero debole, Feltrinelli, Milano, 1983

== See also ==
- Deconstruction
- Postmodern Christianity
- Nihilism
