= Arcavacata =

- Frazione
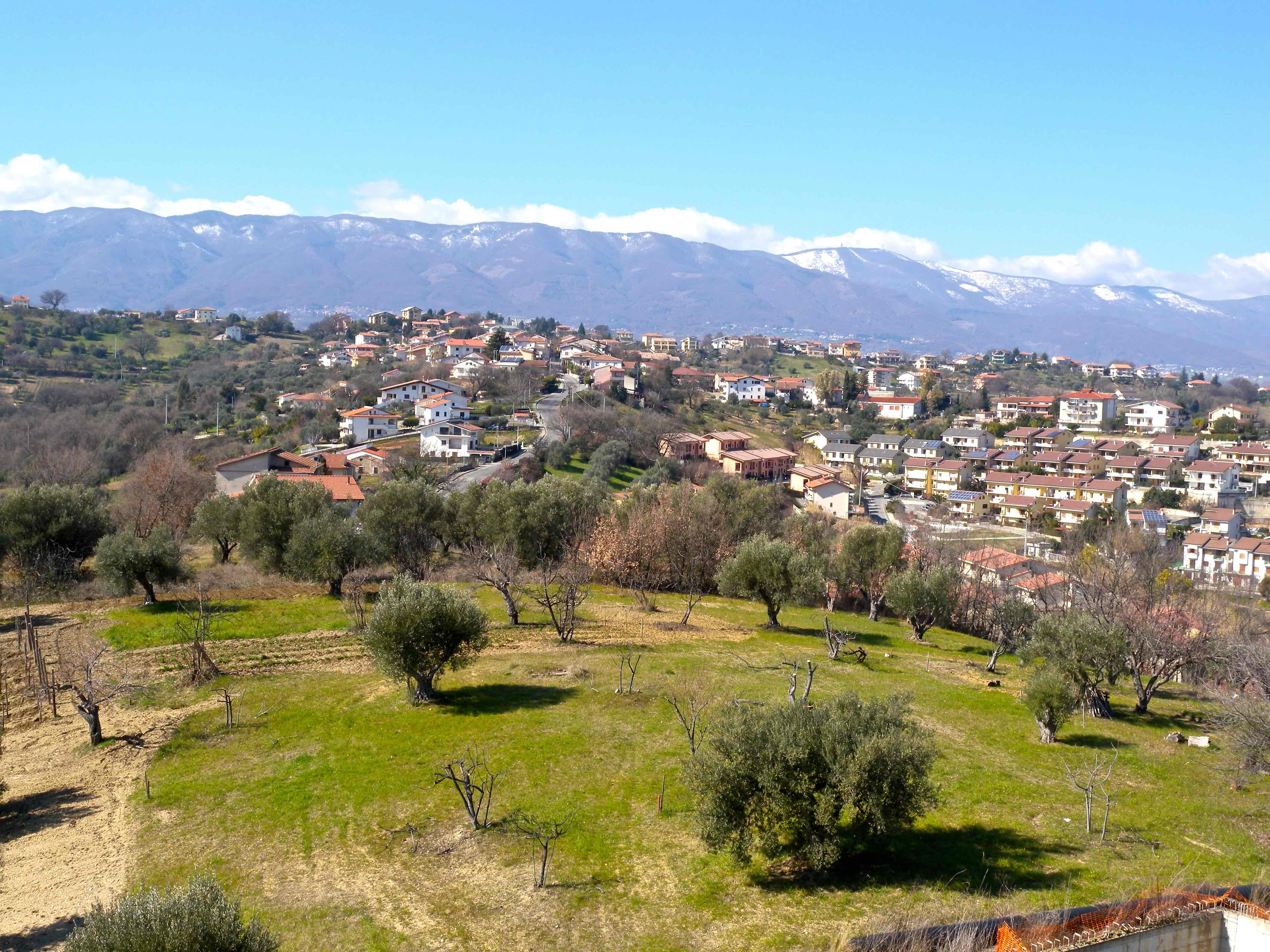
- Panoramic view

- Location of Arcavacata in Italy
- Coordinates: 39°21′29″N 16°12′41″E
- Country: Italy
- Region: Calabria
- Province: Cosenza (CS)
- Comune: Rende
- Elevation: 320 m (1,050 ft)

Population (2009)
  - Total: 1,831
- Demonym: Arcavacatesi
- Time zone: UTC+1 (CET)
  - Summer (DST): UTC+2 (CEST)
- Postal code: 87036
- Dialing code: (+39) 0984
- Patron saint: Our Lady of Consolation
- Saint day: Easter Monday

Arcavacata (Italian pronunciation: [arkaˈvaːkata]) is an Italian hamlet (frazione) of the municipality of Rende in the province of Cosenza, Calabria. Its population is 1,831.

== History ==
The name Arcavacata comes from an ancient fortress-lookout Arce-vocata ("arx suited"), which is found in some papal documents of the Middle Ages. There's also legendary event located a few centuries after today.

On a rainy, windy winter night, a blind man and a lame man walked down the street in search of shelter. Suddenly a light illuminated the two patients and a voice ordered them to dig. Listened to the voice, the light led their way. While digging, they realized they were touching an arch and under the arch something particular stopped them. The light became more intense, it illuminated everything and so the blind man saw and the lame began to walk. The voice told them that they were healed and that a church should be built in that place. What they had found was a painting depicting the Holy Mother with baby Jesus. The church was erected and the picture was placed above the altar (it is still there today). Dug out of an arch, the picture gave its name to the place where it was found: Arcavacata. The painting is from the 14th century and is of perennial devotion to the Mother of Consolation by the inhabitants of Arcavacata.

== Geography ==
The village is located on the hills north of the urban area of Cosenza, close to Quattromiglia and 4 km (2.5 miles) from Rende.

== Culture ==
The hamlet of Arcavacata is famous because in its territory there is the University of Calabria, the largest campus in Italy. In the historical centre there are a lot of ancient construction like houses and old palaces: for example the important palace of the noble family Magdalone of Rende.

The most important historical place is the Church of Our Lady of Consolation, built in the historical centre of Arcavacata in the second middle of the 19th century. It's an ancient church with a lot of painting and sculptures. It's the Parish Church of Arcavacata and near Santo Stefano Hamlet.

== Gallery ==
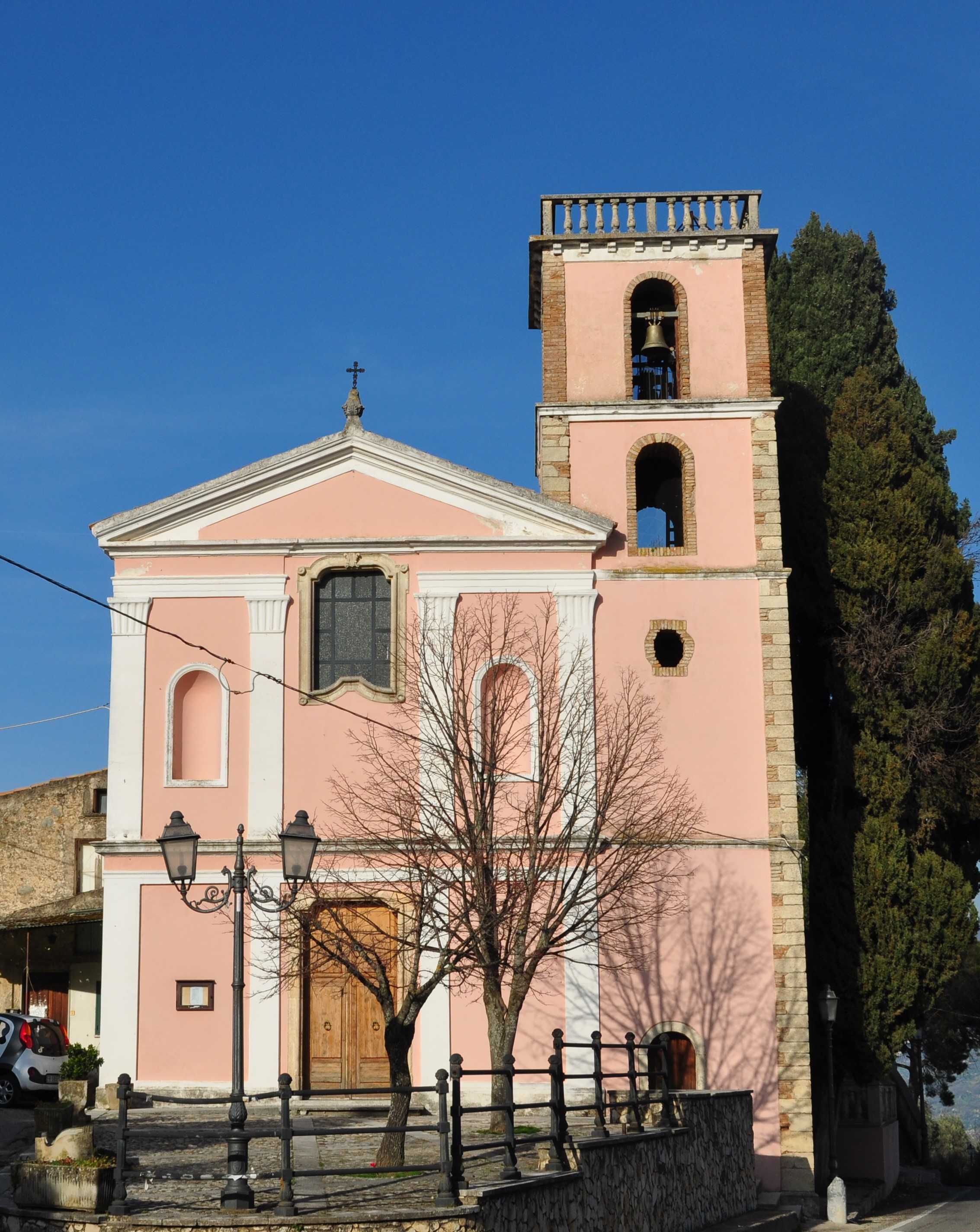
Church of Our Lady Of Consolation.

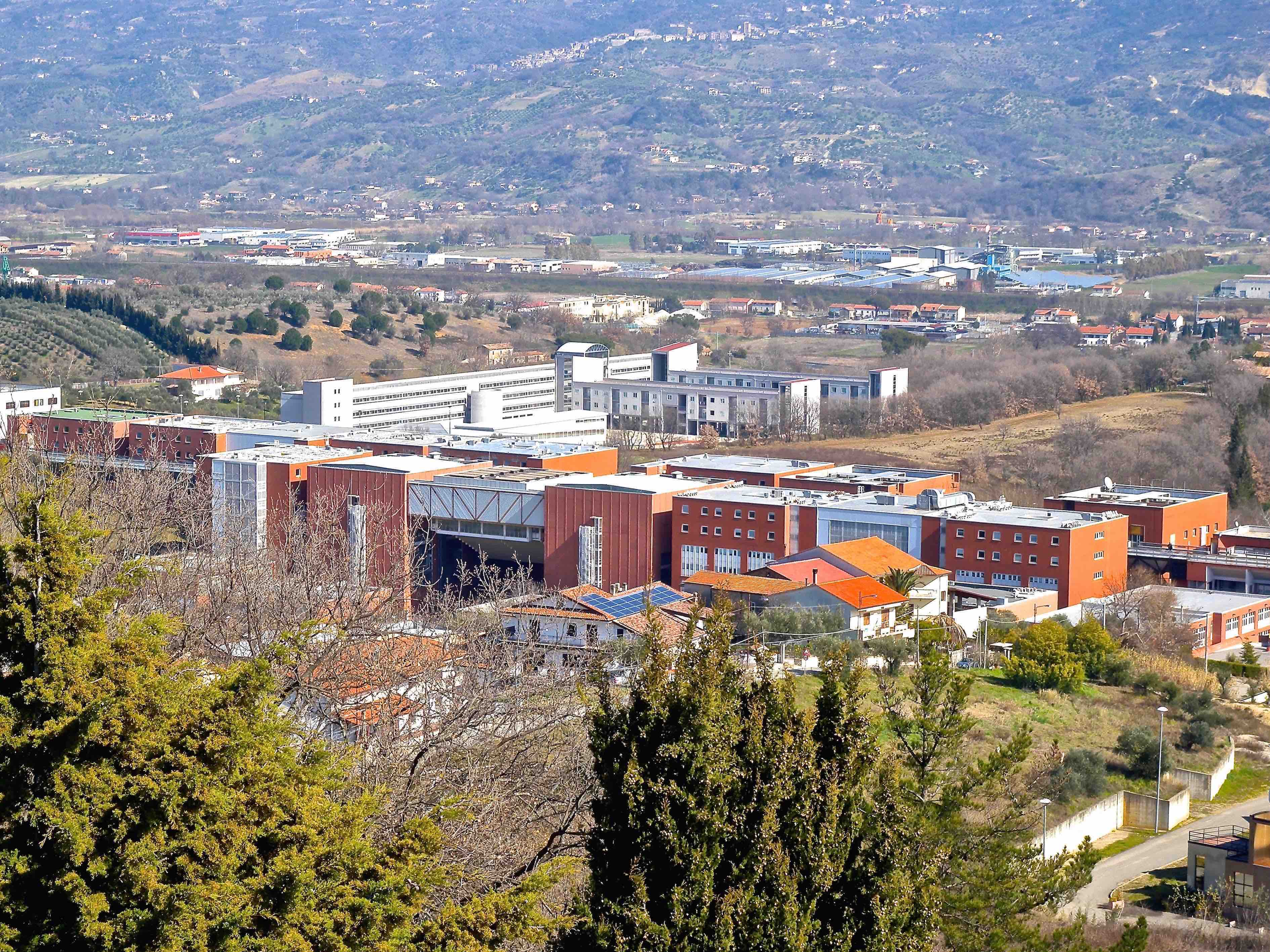
The University of Arcavacata

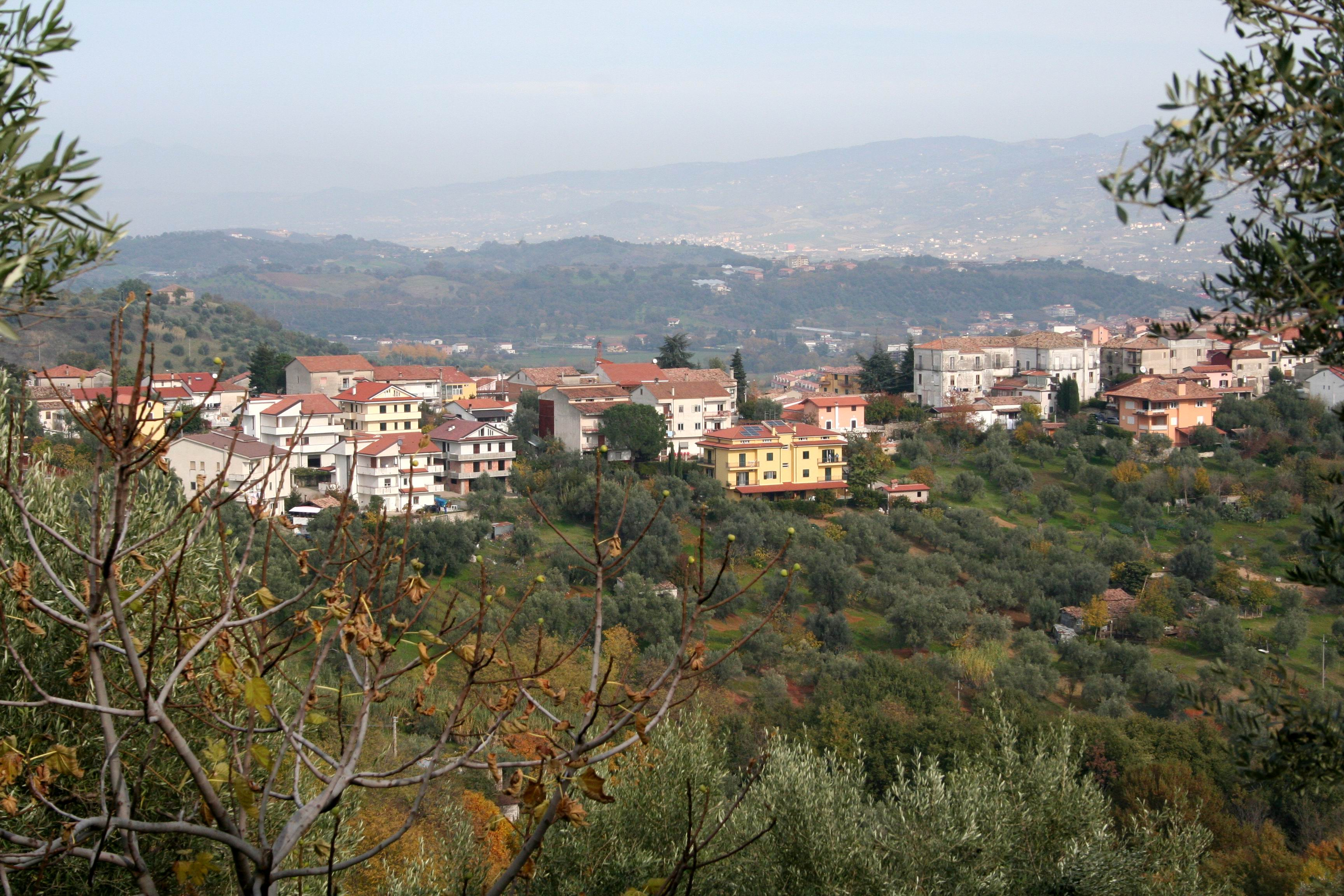
The old centre

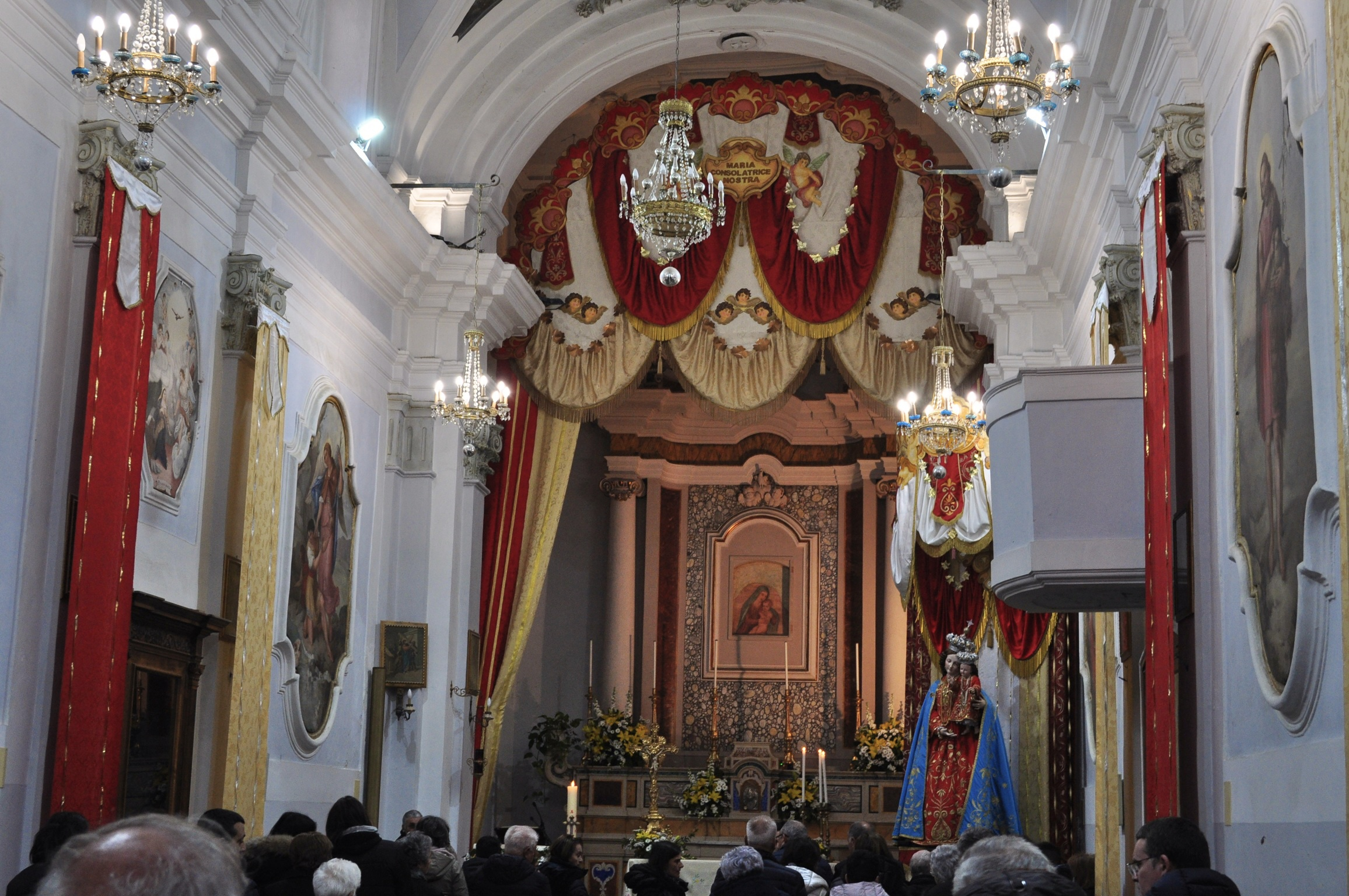
The Church during the solemn celebration for the Virgin Mary on Easter Monday 2023.

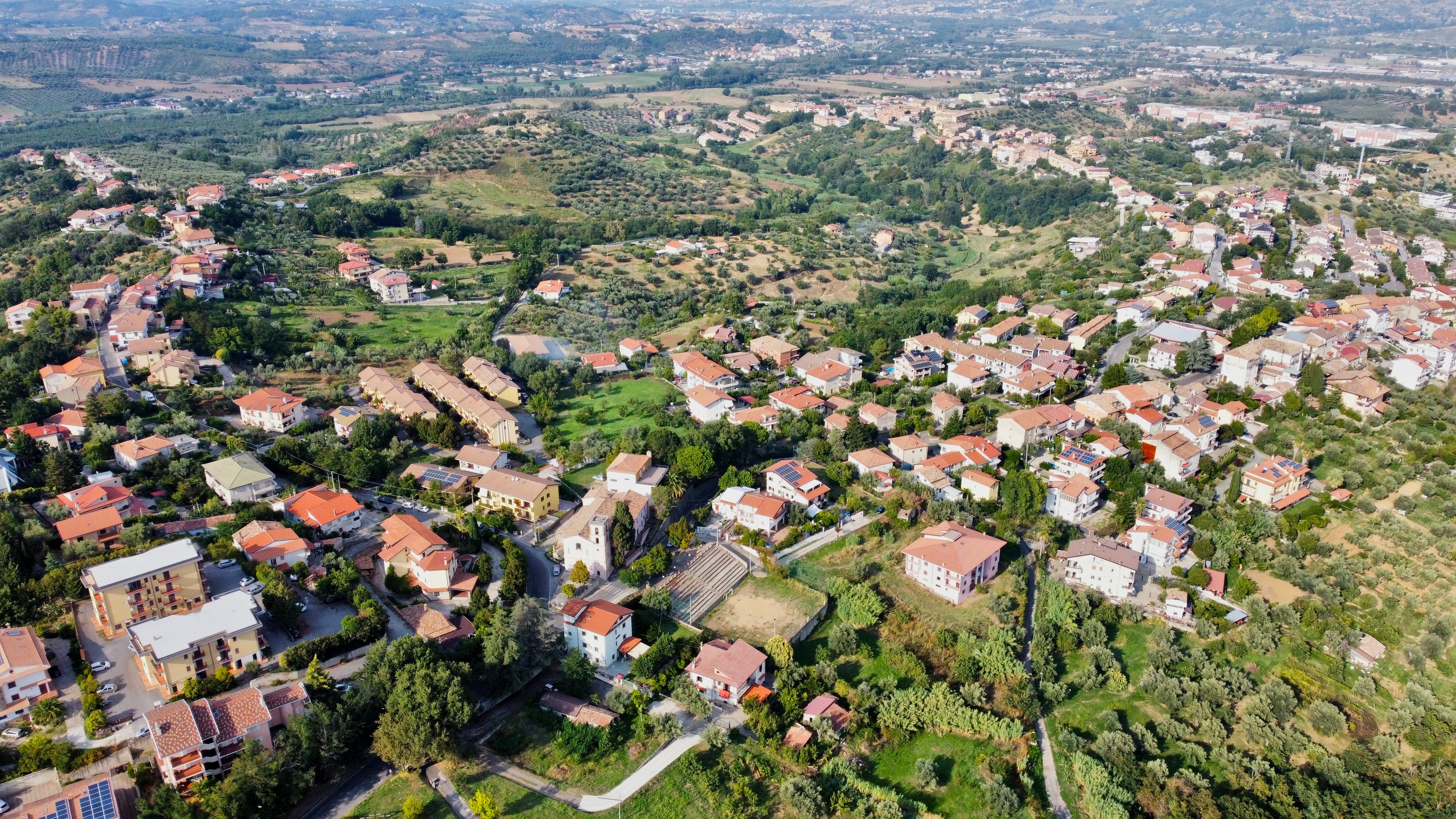
Arcavacata on the top.

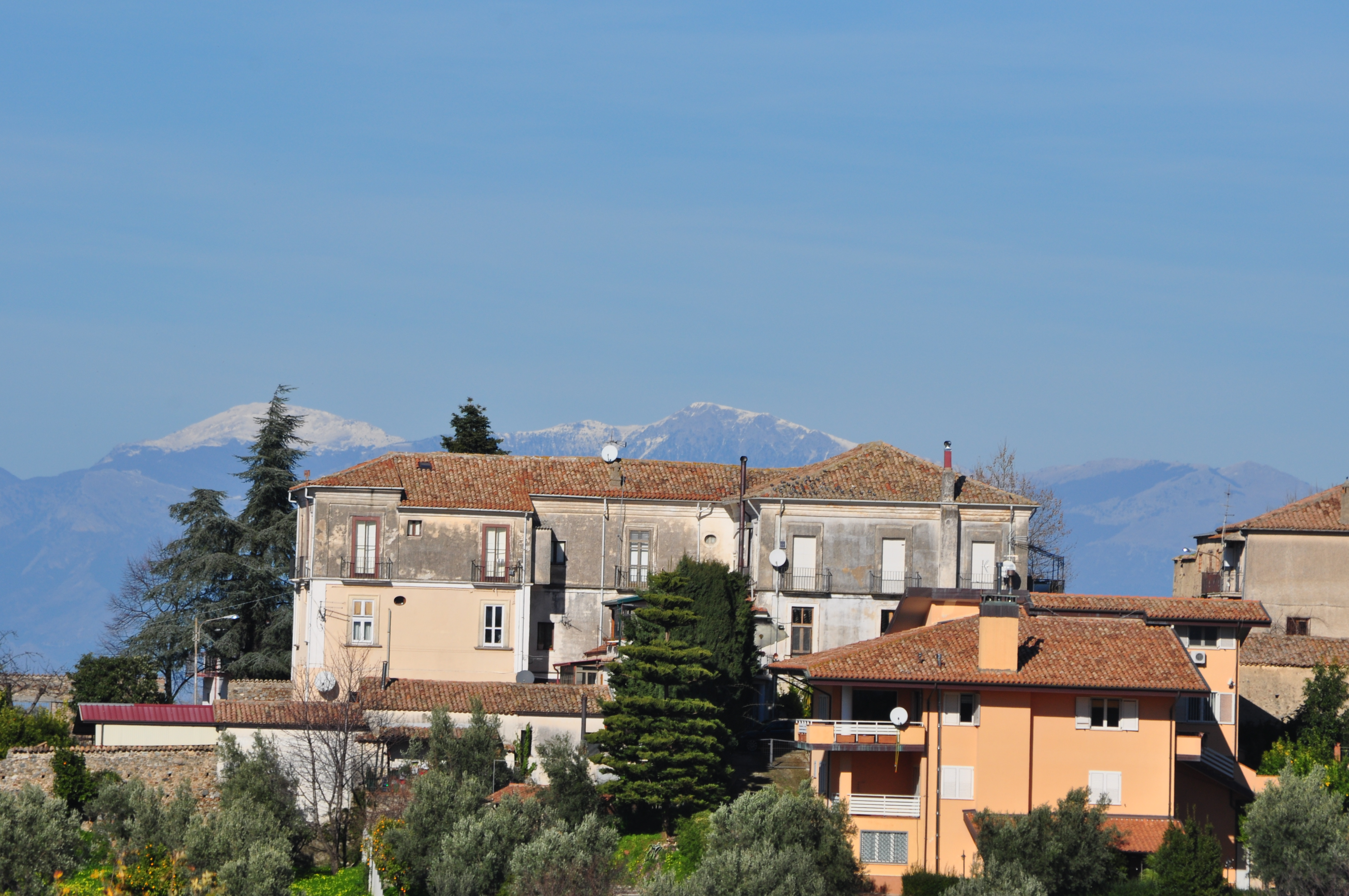
The Magdalone’s Palace, an ancient noble palace.

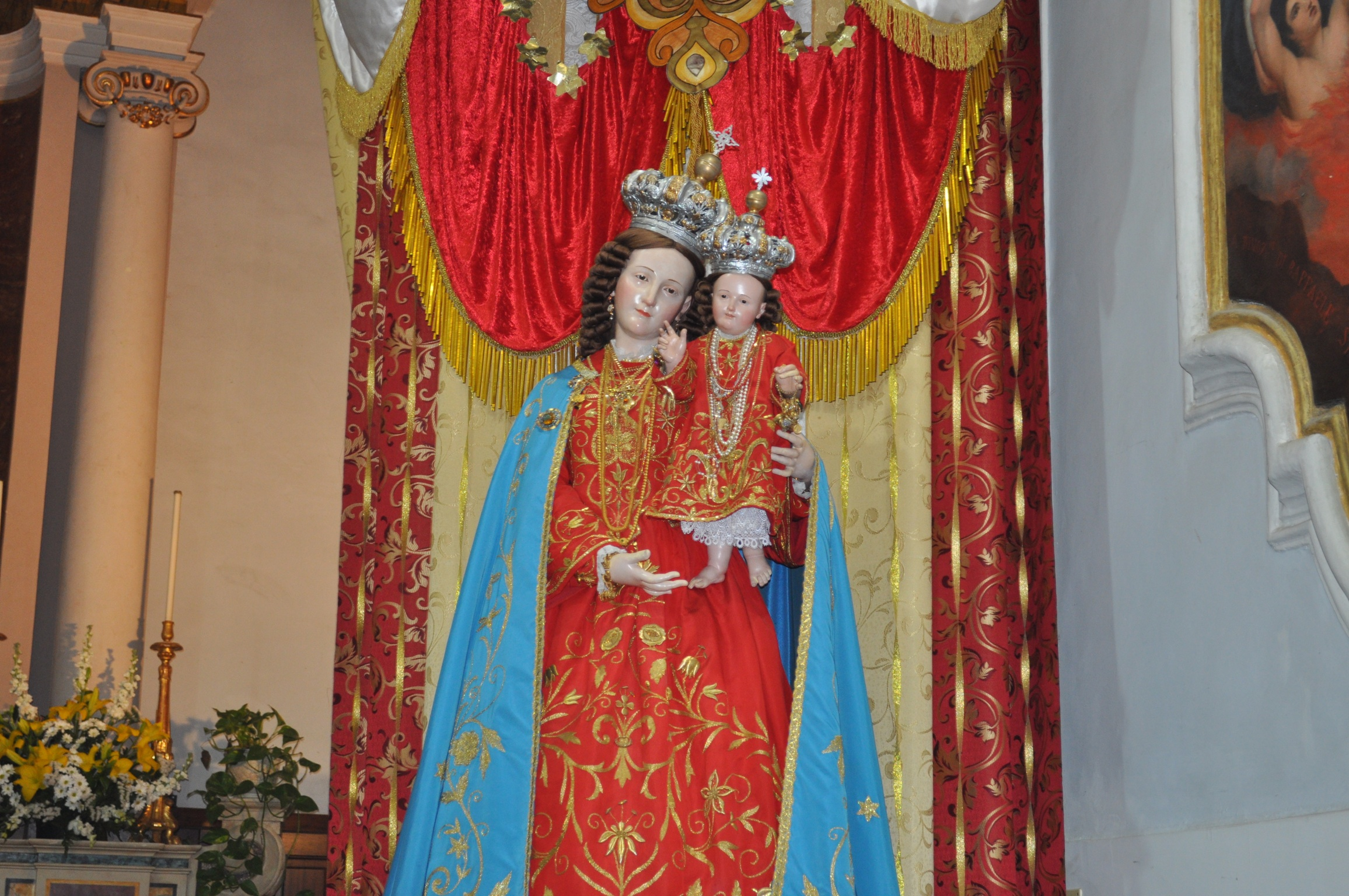
The Holy Virgin of Consolation, Patron Saint of Arcavacata

== See also ==
- Orto Botanico dell'Università della Calabria
