= Rose, Calabria =

Rose
- Comune
- Comune di Rose
- Location within Italy Location within Calabria
- Coordinates: 39°24′N 16°17′E
- Country: Italy
- Region: Calabria
- Province: Cosenza (CS)

Government
  - Mayor: Roberto Barbieri

Area
  - Total: 47.49 km^{2} (18.34 sq mi)
- Elevation: 399 m (1,309 ft)

Population (2007)
  - Total: 4,365
  - Density: 91.91/km^{2} (238.1/sq mi)
- Demonym: Rosetani
- Time zone: UTC+1 (CET)
  - Summer (DST): UTC+2 (CEST)
- Postal code: 87040
- Dialing code: 0984
- ISTAT code: 078106
- Patron saint: St. Lawrence
- Saint day: 10 August
- Website: Official website

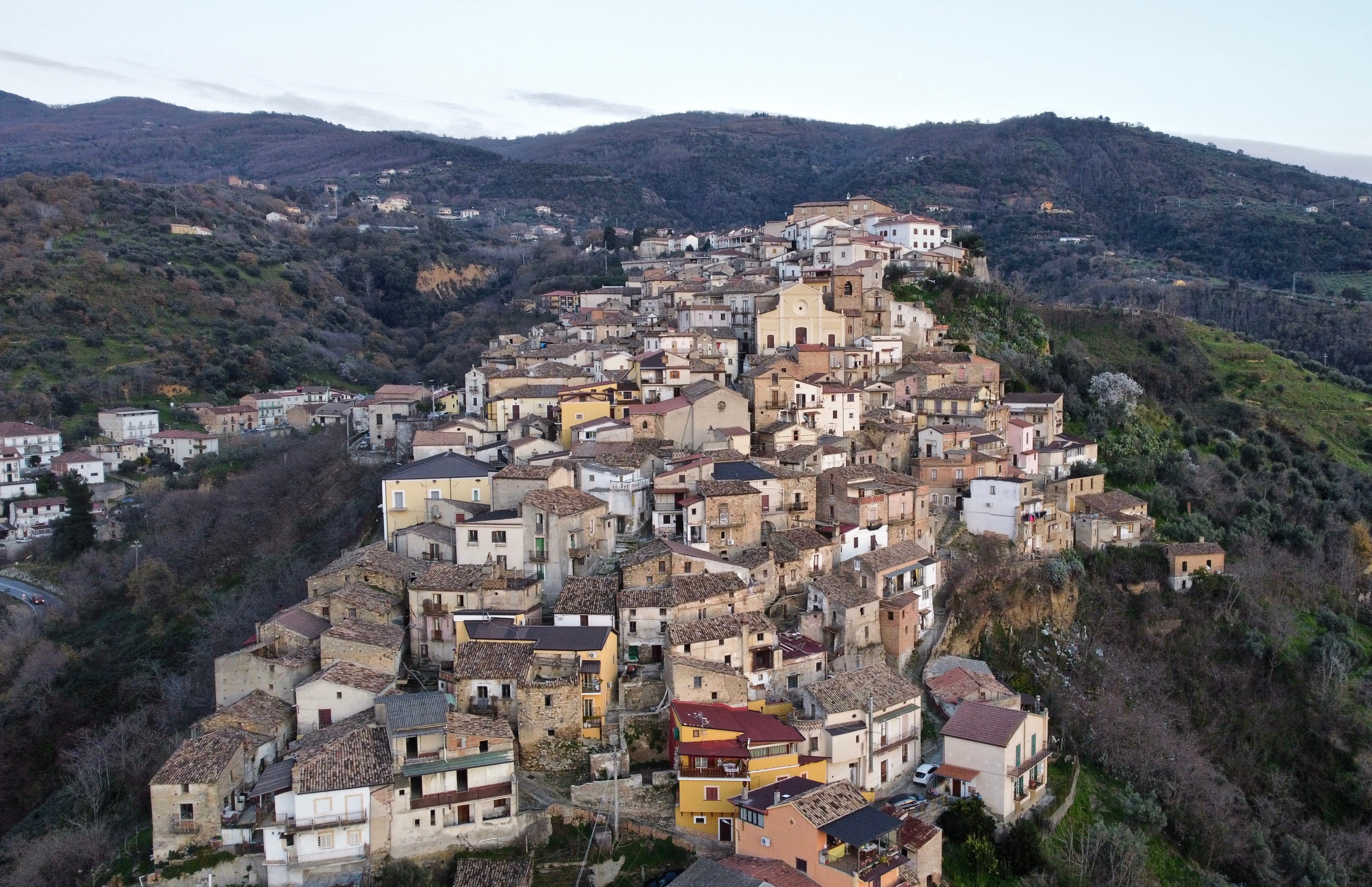
The center of Rose in 2022

Rose is a town and comune in the province of Cosenza in the Calabria region of southern Italy.
