= University of Calabria =

Public university in Arcavacata, Italy

Coordinates: 39°21′49″N 16°13′35″E

- Università della Calabria
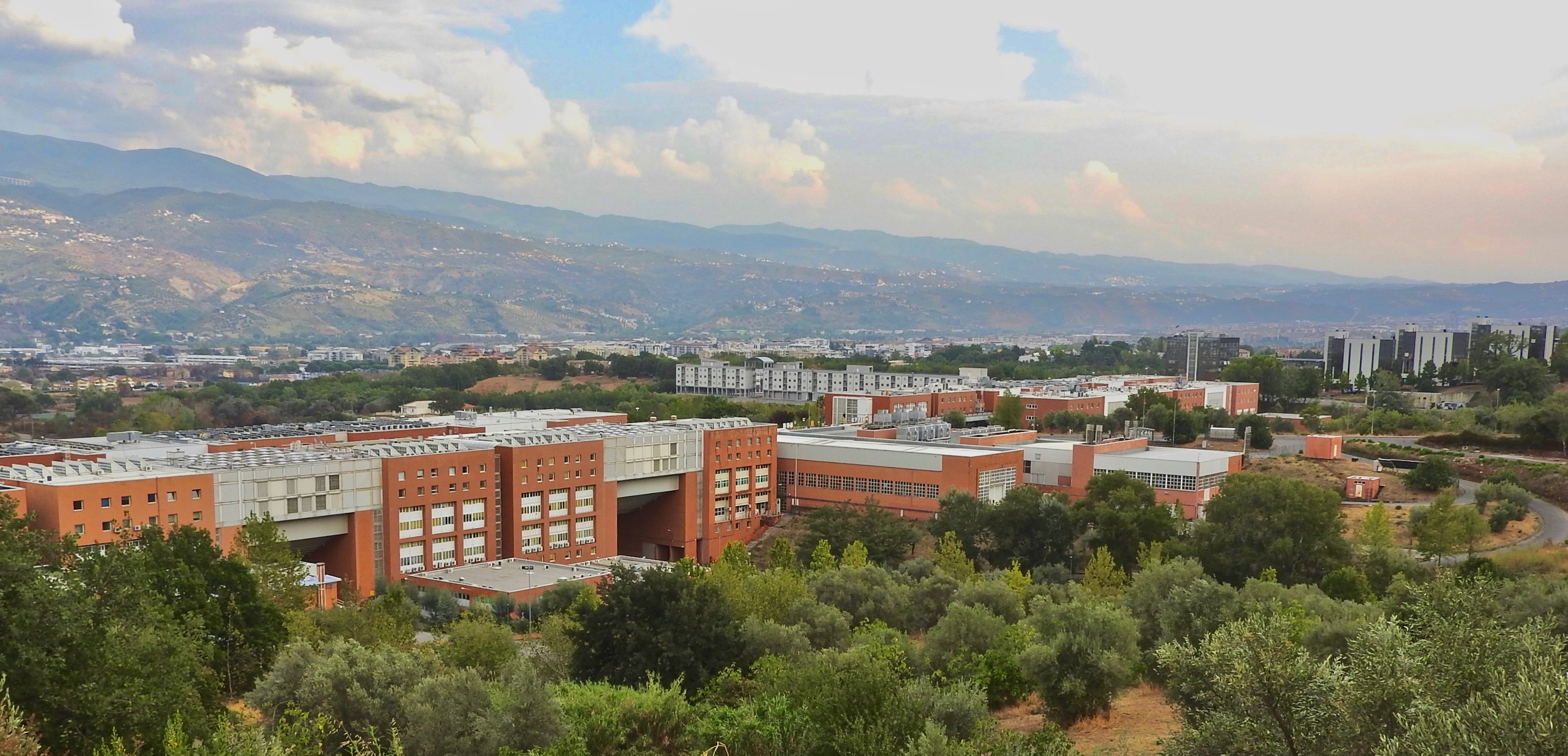
- Type: Public
- Established: 1972
- Rector: Prof. Gianluigi Greco
- Administrative staff: 800
- Students: ca 35,000
- Location: Rende; Cosenza, Italy
- Campus: Rural
- Sports teams: CUS Cosenza
- Website: Official website

The University of Calabria (Italian: Università della Calabria, UNICAL) is a state-run university in Italy. Located in Arcavacata, a hamlet of Rende and a suburb of Cosenza, the university was founded in 1972. Among its founders there were Beniamino Andreatta, Giorgio Gagliani, Pietro Bucci and Paolo Sylos Labini. It currently has about 35,000 students, 800 teaching and research staff and about 700 administrative staff.

Since 2024, the University has held the first position among the "Big-sized Italian Universities" in the Censis ranking.

== Campus ==
The founders of the university were Beniamino Andreatta, Giorgio Gagliani, Pietro Bucci and Paolo Sylos Labini. On 15 January 2009, the main lecture hall was named after Beniamino Andreatta, while the "bridge", i.e. the main entrance to the cubes, was named after Pietro Bucci.

=== Historical precedents ===
The University of Calabria, established by Law No. 442 of 12 March 1968, had two historical precedents: King Ferdinand I of the Two Sicilies, by royal decree issued in 1814 on the initiative of the Province of Cosenza, authorised the Cosenza High School to open a Faculty of Medicine and, to this end, allocated a grant of three thousand ducats. The first unified government removed this privilege from the Liceo in 1861 (while the schools of Notary and Pharmacy in Catanzaro survived until 1923).

The second attempt was made by the anti-fascist radiologist Oscar Fragale, a veteran, founder of the Centre for Action for the Development of Southern Italy, and owner of the Corriere del Sud newspaper, thanks to whom the University of Cosenza (later Calabro-Lucana) was inaugurated in February 1945 under the auspices of Nicola Serra. It offered courses in medicine, surgery and law. Fragale himself personally made his clinical and radiology laboratories available for the chair of Occupational Pathology, which he would have held. However, the development of this university was abandoned within a very short time.

== Organization ==
The University is organized in the following departments:

- Biology, Ecology and Earth Sciences (DIBEST)
- Chemistry and Chemical Technologies (CTC)
- Culture, Education and Society (DiCES)
- Economics, Statistics and Finance 'Giovanni Anania' (DESF)
- Pharmacy and Health and Nutrition Sciences (DFSSN)
- Physics
- Environmental Engineering (DIAm)
- Civil Engineering (DInCi)
- Computer Engineering, Modelling, Electronics and Systems Engineering (DIMES)
- Mechanical, Energy and Management Engineering (DIMEG)
- Mathematics and Computer Science (DeMaCS)
- Business and Legal Sciences (DiSCAG)
- Political and Social Sciences (DiSPES)
- Humanities (DiSU)

=== Campus ===
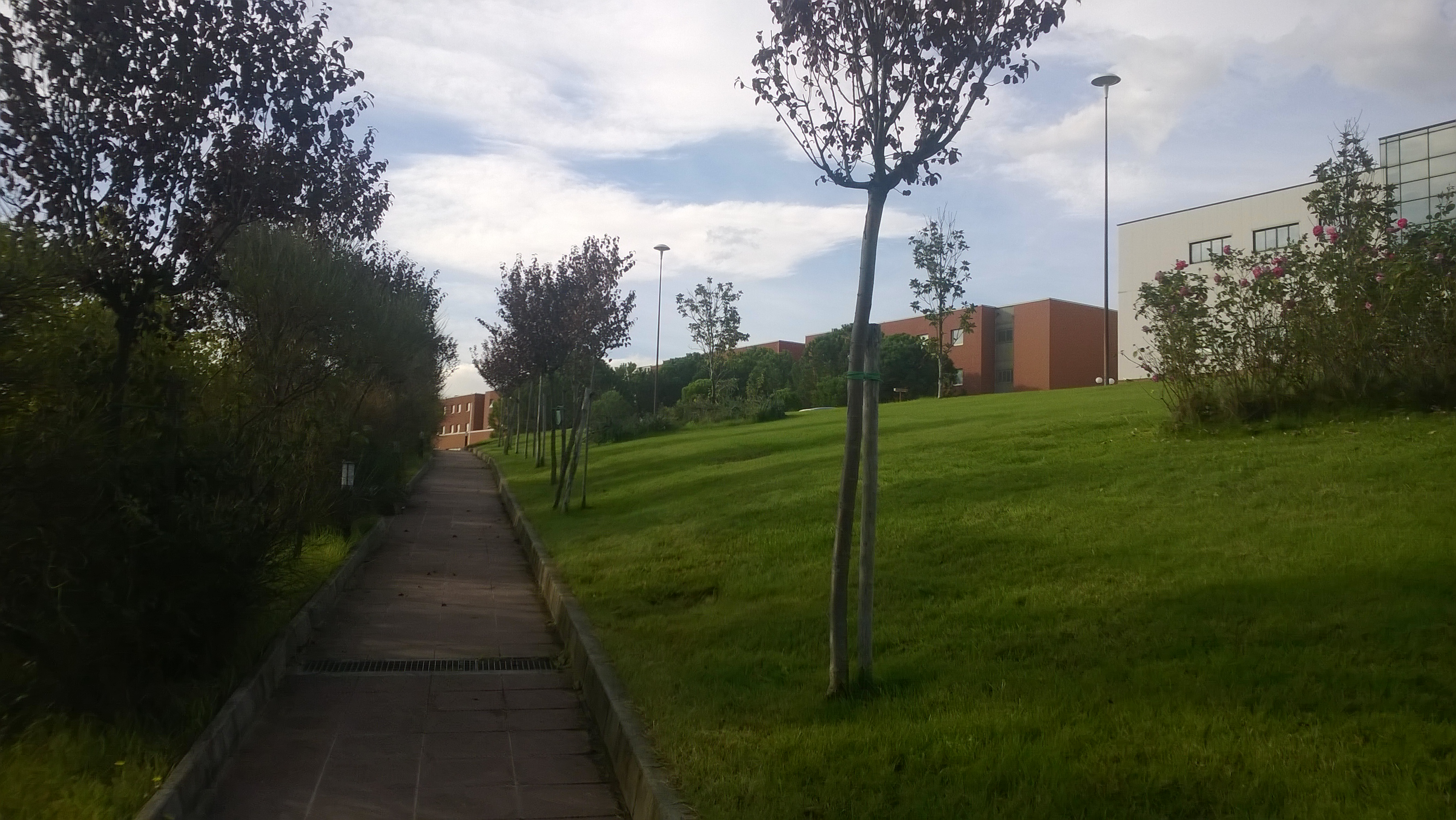
View of a campus avenue.

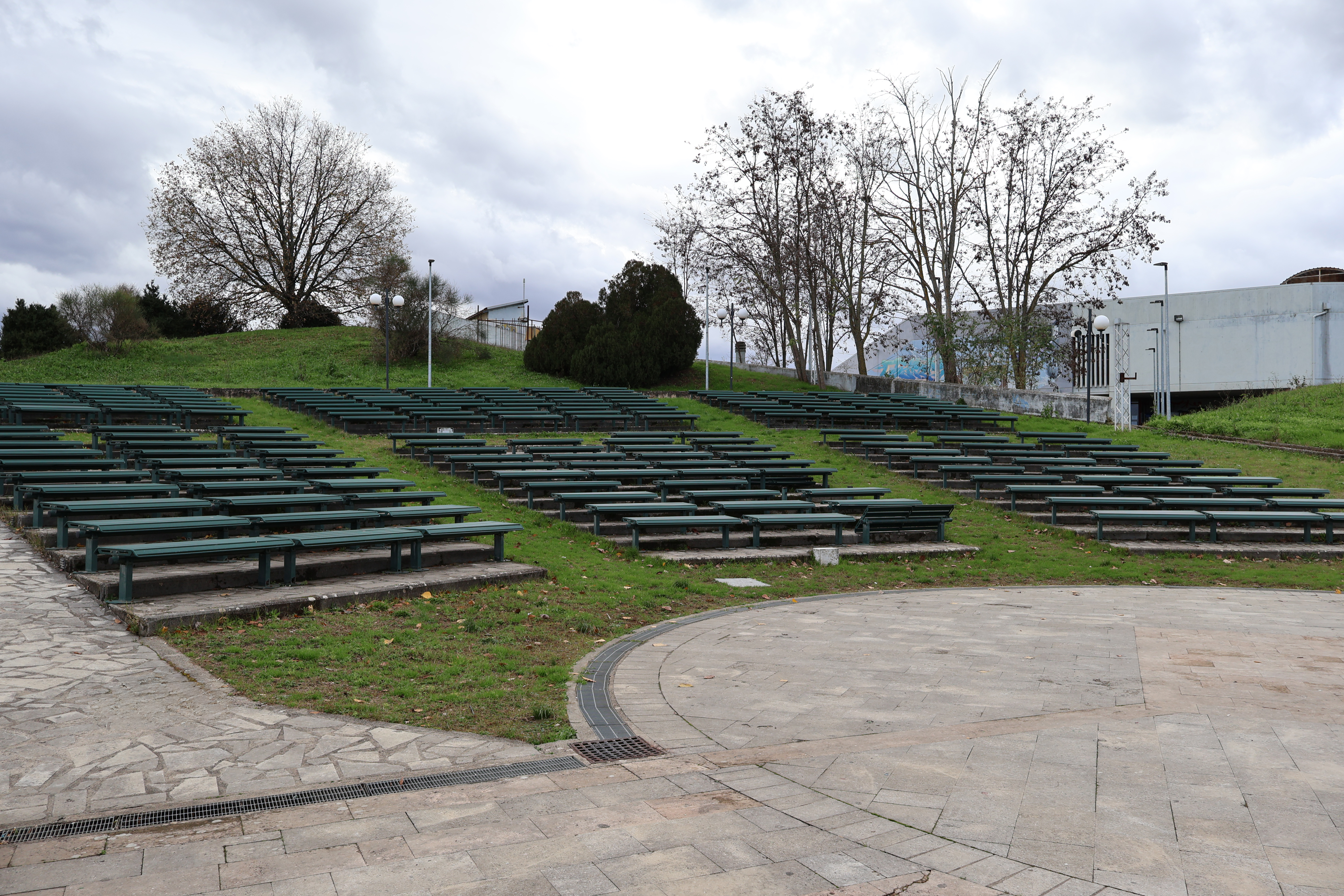
View of the open-air theatre located near the multi-purpose building.

The campus covers an area of approximately 200 hectares in the hills of Arcavacata di Rende, a few kilometres from the centre of Cosenza. Initially, the university consisted of a single complex, the multi-purpose building in Arcavacata, designed by Massimo Pica Ciamarra, which later became the headquarters of the Department of Pharmacy, Health Sciences and Nutrition. As of 2025, new classrooms are under construction (intended for TD medical degree courses).[1] The design of the University of Calabria campus is by Vittorio Gregotti and is part of a phase of his research aimed at combining architecture and landscape planning. The university complex is shaped like a long pier, approximately two kilometres long, which crosses the Crati river valley. The pier, called the "Pietro Bucci" bridge, is made of reinforced concrete and includes a vehicle lane and a pedestrian walkway. The buildings of the various university departments are cubic in shape and up to thirty metres high; they are connected to the horizontal structure of the pier, varying in height according to the changes in the hills of Arcavacata. The various paths interconnected to the bridge lead to the campus buildings. At the base of the university, there is also a residential centre designed by Enzo Zacchiroli, as well as some buildings designed by Vittorio Gregotti himself, while the subsequent residences are the work of Danish architect Tarquini Martensson.

University rankings

Global – Overall
- QS World: 951-1000 (2026)

The monumental complex of San Domenico in the historic centre of Cosenza will host the three-year degree course in Nursing from the 2023-2024 academic year and, from the 2025-2026 academic year, the three-year degree course in Psychological Sciences and Techniques and the degree course in Physiotherapy, with the creation of a healthcare professions centre.

With the establishment of the Faculty of Medicine and Surgery - TD, an agreement was signed in 2023 between the University and the Cosenza Hospital Authority, initially covering the departments of Surgery, Haematology, Cardiology, Oncology, Internal Medicine, Urology, Thoracic Surgery, Nephrology, Gastroenterology, Analysis Laboratory and SITRA (Technical and Rehabilitation Nursing Service) of the hospital.

On 1 August 2024, the Ministry of University and Research accredited the new degree course in Medicine and Surgery TD (Digital Technologies), which will start in Crotone in the academic year 24/25. The course, strongly supported by the President of the Region, Roberto Occhiuto, is the result of a collaboration between the University of Calabria and the Magna Grecia University of Catanzaro.

In September, the Ministry also approved the establishment of five medical specialisation schools (Cardiology, Surgery, Haematology, Nephrology and Clinical Pathology) at the "Annunziata" hospital in Cosenza, in synergy with other universities and hospitals in Calabria.

In January 2025, a meeting was held in the conference room of the Grande Ospedale Metropolitano in Reggio Calabria between MEP Giusy Princi and the rectors of the three Calabrian universities to begin work on setting up a medical course in the city of Reggio.

== Research ==
=== Reparto corse ===
The Unical reparto corse is a project of The Department of Mechanical Engineering, Management and Energy (DIMEG) that started in 2005. The group involves students and professors applying the knowledge gained in their studies to develop race cars that compete in European races.

== Points of interest ==
- Botanical Garden
- Museum of Paleontology
- Arts, Music and Entertainment Center
- Sports Center

== List of Honoris Causa Degrees awarded by the University of Calabria ==
- 1981 Gerhard Rohlfs in Literature
- 1986 Luigi Luca Cavalli Sforza in Natural Science
- 1991 Silvio Berlusconi in Management Engineering
- 1994 Carlo Dionisotti in Literature
- 1996 Gianni Amelio in Literature
- 2000 Eric P. Hamp in Literature
- 2003 Frank Iacobucci in Political Science
- 2003 Gianvito Resta in Literature
- 2008 Boris Ulianich in History
- 2010 Saverio Strati in Modern Philology
- 2012 Roberto Benigni in Modern Philology
- 2012 Salomon Resnik in Philosophy
- 2012 Mario Martone in Arts, Cinema and Media languages
- 2013 Vandana Shiva in Nutrition Science

== See also ==
- List of Italian universities
