= Lappano =

Lappano Greek: Appáno
- Comune
- Comune di Lappano
- Location within Italy Location within Calabria
- Coordinates: 39°19′N 16°19′E
- Country: Italy
- Region: Calabria
- Province: Cosenza (CS)

Government
  - Mayor: Angelo Marcello Gaccione

Area
  - Total: 12.21 km^{2} (4.71 sq mi)
- Elevation: 656 m (2,152 ft)

Population (2007)
  - Total: 970
  - Density: 79/km^{2} (210/sq mi)
- Demonym: Lappanesi
- Time zone: UTC+1 (CET)
  - Summer (DST): UTC+2 (CEST)
- Postal code: 87050
- Dialing code: 0984
- Website: Official website

Lappano is a town and comune in the province of Cosenza in the Calabria region of southern Italy.
