= Santiago Zabala =

Italian philosopher

- Born: 1975

Philosophical work
- Era: Contemporary philosophy
- Region: Western philosophy
- School: Continental
- Main interests: Hermeneutics; Philosophy of Warnings; Ontology; Aesthetics; Political philosophy
- Notable ideas: Philosophy of Warnings
- Website: www.santiagozabala.com

Santiago Zabala (born 1975) is a philosopher and ICREA Research Professor of Philosophy at the Pompeu Fabra University. His books have been translated into several languages and his articles have been published in The Guardian, Al Jazeera English, The New York Times, and the Los Angeles Review of Books, among other international media outlets. In the fall of 2024 and beginning of 2025 the prestigious cultural institution Circulo de Bellas Artes of Madrid hosted an exhibition based on Zabala’s aesthetic theory titled The Greatest Emergency.

== Philosophy ==
His books, articles, and research focus on the meaning of art, politics, and freedom in the twenty-first century when, as he claims, "the greatest emergency has become the absence of emergency." The goal of philosophy for Zabala is to thrust us into these absent emergencies (such as climate change or economic inequality) in order to disrupt the ongoing “return to order” that surveillance capitalism and right-wing populism are imposing upon us. These problems are discussed in his most recent books—Being at Large: Freedom in the Age of Alternative Facts (McGill-Queen's University Press, 2020), Why Only Art Can Save Us: Aesthetics and the Absence of Emergency (Columbia University Press, 2017), Outspoken: A Manifesto for the 21st Century (with Adrian Parr, McGill-Queen's University Press, 2023), in the exhibition The Greatest Emergency—and in many articles. His latest book is Signs from the Future. A Philosophy of Warnings (Columbia University Press, 2025; forthcoming in Spanish translation from Trotta and Italian from DeriveApprodi in 2026).

== Career ==
Zabala is ICREA Research Professor at the Pompeu Fabra University, where he currently teaches contemporary and political philosophy, supervises MA and Ph.D. thesis and the UPF Center for Vattimo's Archives and Philosophy. In addition to an extensive speaking schedule at conferences, festivals, and art Biennales, Zabala is also visiting professor in several European, Asian, and American Universities.

== Critics ==
The Journal "Iride" released a forum in 2021 with critical articles by Simona Venezia, Valerio Rocco Lozano and Federico Vercellone on Zabala's Being at Large.

The Journal "Lebenswelt. Aesthetics and Philosophy of Experience" released a forum in 2019 with critical articles by Amanda Boetzkes, Daniela Angelucci, Ivelise Perniola, and Paul Kottmann on Zabala's Why Only Art can Save Us. The forum also includes responses by Zabala.

In 2017 S. Mazzini and O. Glyn-Williams released a book on Hermeneutic Communism published by Springer Verlag, Making Communism Hermeneutic: Reading Vattimo and Zabala, with critical contributions from 17 renown scholars from all over the world as well as Vattimo and Zabala's responses.

According to Hamid Dabashi "European thinkers like Žižek and Zabala, important and insightful as they are in their own immediate circles, are out of touch with these realities, and to the degree that they are they cannot come to terms with their unfolding particularities in terms immediate to their idiomaticities. For them "Philosophy" is a mental gymnastics performed with the received particulars of European philosophy in its postmodern or poststructuralist registers – exciting and productive to the degree that they can be." Zabala's response to Dabashi in Al-Jazeera.

Also, Brian Leiter criticized Zabala on his blog (Leiter Reports). Columbia University Press Blog posted Zabala's response to Leiter.

== Bibliography ==
Author

- Signs from the Future. A Philosophy of Warnings. 2025. New York: Columbia University Press. Spanish and Italian translations forthcoming in 2026 from Trotta editor and DeriveApprodi.
- Being at Large. Freedom in the Age of Alternative Facts (2020). Montreal: McGill-Queen's University Press. Translated into Spanish and Italian
- Why Only Art can Save Us. Aesthetics and the Absence of Emergency (2017). New York: Columbia University Press.
- Hermeneutic Communism (2011, coauthored with G. Vattimo) New York: Columbia University Press. Translated into Italian, Spanish, and Turkish.
- The Remains of Being (2009). New York: Columbia University Press. Translated into Chinese and Spanish.
- The Hermeneutic Nature of Analytic Philosophy. A Study of E. Tugendhat (2008). New York: Columbia University Press. Translated into Italian.

Editor

- Outspoken: A Manifesto for the 21st Century, edited by Adrian Parr and Santiago Zabala (2023) Montreal: McGill-Queen's University Press.
- Being at its Surroundings, by Gianni Vattimo, edited by A. Martinengo, G. Iannantuono, and S. Zabala (2022) Montreal: McGill-Queen's University Press.
- The Future of Religion, by Richard Rorty and Gianni Vattimo, edited by S. Zabala, (2005) New York: Columbia University Press. Translated in 16 languages.
- Consequences of Hermeneutics (2010, co-edited with Jeff Malpas) Northwestern University Press.
- Nihilism and Emancipation, by Gianni Vattimo, edited by S. Zabala, (2004) New York: Columbia University Press. Translated in 6 languages.
- Weakening Philosophy, edited by S. Zabala (2007) Montreal: McGill-Queen's University Press. Translated into Spanish and Italian.
- Art's Claim to Truth, by Gianni Vattimo, edited by S. Zabala (2008) New York: Columbia University Press.
- On Philosophical Education, edited by S. Zabala. Special Issue of Philosophy Today: An International Journal of Contemporary Philosophy, Volume 61, Issue 2 (Spring 2017). With contributions from Judith Butler, Simon Critchley, and others.
- The Emergency of Philosophy, edited by S. Zabala. Special Issue of Philosophy Today: An International Journal of Contemporary Philosophy, Volume 59, Issue 4 (Fall 2015). With contributions from Adrian Parr, Bonnie Honig, and others.
- Being Shaken, (2014, co-edited with M. Marder) Palgrave.

== See also ==
- Pompeu Fabra University
- Catalan Institution for Research and Advanced Studies
- Global Center for Advanced Studies
