= Renzo Gattegna =

Italian lawyer (1939–2020)

Renzo Gattegna (30 November 1939 – 10 November 2020) was an Italian lawyer from Rome.

== Career ==
Gattegna was the President of the Union of Italian Jewish Communities. He was elected to the position on 16 July 2006, replacing Claudio Morpurgo who served as President after the resignation of Amos Luzzatto. Gattegna was 67 years old at the time of his appointment to the role.
