= Gianni Vattimo =

Italian philosopher and politician (1936–2023)

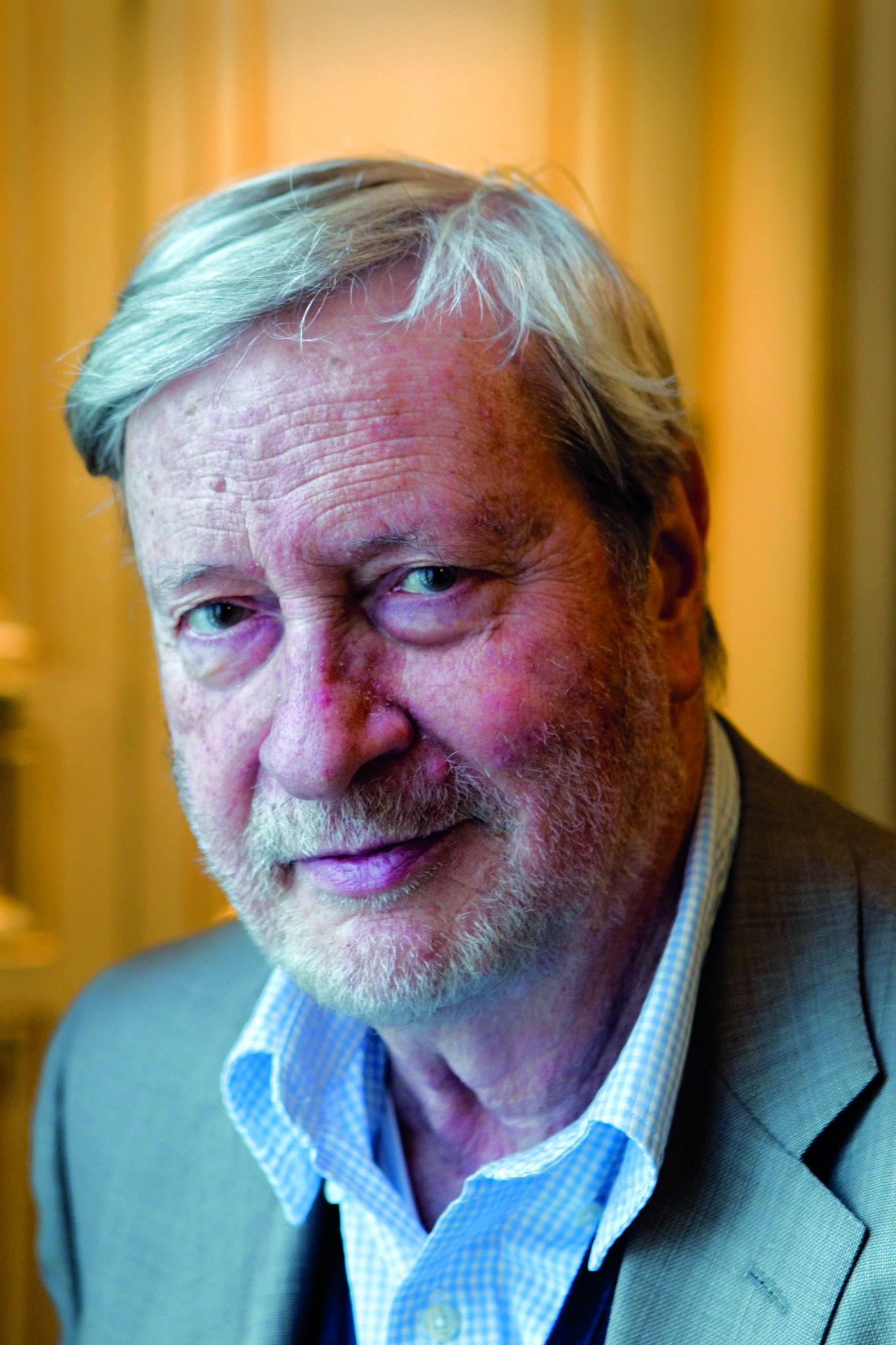
- Born: Gianteresio Vattimo; 4 January 1936; Turin, Kingdom of Italy
- Died: 19 September 2023 (aged 87); Turin, Italy

Education
- Education: University of Turin (laurea, 1959)
- Academic advisors: Hans-Georg Gadamer; Luigi Pareyson

Philosophical work
- Era: Contemporary philosophy
- Region: Western philosophy
- School: Continental philosophy Phenomenology; Hermeneutics; Postmodernism
- Institutions: University of Turin
- Notable students: Maurizio Ferraris
- Main interests: Ethics; Political philosophy
- Notable ideas: Weak thought, hermeneutic communism

Member of the European Parliament for North-West Italy
- In office 14 July 2009 – 1 July 2014
- In office 20 July 1999 – 19 July 2004

Gianteresio "Gianni" Vattimo (Italian: [ˈdʒanni ˈvattimo]; 4 January 1936 – 19 September 2023) was an Italian philosopher and politician.

== Life and career ==
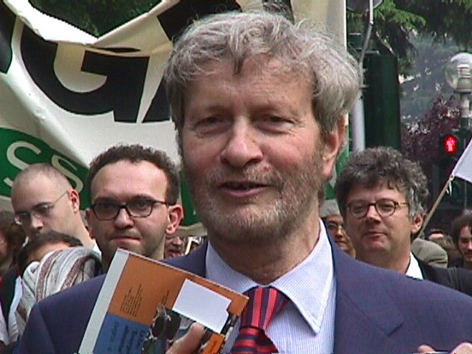
Vattimo at a pride event in Como, 1999

Born in Turin, Piedmont, Vattimo studied philosophy under Luigi Pareyson, an existentialist philosopher, at the University of Turin and graduated with a laurea in 1959. In 1963, he moved to the University of Heidelberg and studied with Karl Löwith, Jürgen Habermas, and Hans-Georg Gadamer with a scholarship from the Alexander von Humboldt Foundation.

Vattimo returned to Turin, where he became assistant professor in 1964 and later full professor of Aesthetics in 1969. While remaining at Turin, becoming Professor of Theoretical Philosophy in 1982, he had been a visiting professor at a number of American Universities. For his works, he received honorary degrees from the universities of La Plata, Palermo, Madrid, Havana, and Lima. Vattimo said he was exempted from military service.

After being active in the Radical Party, the short-lived Alleanza per Torino, and the Democrats of the Left, Vattimo joined the Party of Italian Communists. He was elected a member of the European Parliament for the first time in 1999 and for a second mandate in 2009. Vattimo was openly gay. In 2010, Vattimo delivered the Gifford Lectures on The End of Reality at the University of Glasgow. In the same year, he participated in the Subversive Film Festival. In March 2012, he was a speaker at the national congress of the Grand Orient of Italy in Rimini.

Vattimo died in Turin on 19 September 2023 at the age of 87.

== Philosophy ==
Vattimo's philosophy can be characterized as postmodern with his emphasis on weak thought (pensiero debole). This requires that the foundational certainties of modernity with its emphasis on objective truth founded in a rational unitary subject be relinquished for a more multi-faceted conception closer to that of the arts. He draws on the philosophy of Martin Heidegger with his critique of foundations and the hermeneutic philosophy of Gadamer, his teacher. Perhaps his greatest influence is the thought of Friedrich Nietzsche, whose "discovery of the 'lie', the discovery that alleged 'values' and metaphysical structures are just a play of forces" (1993:93), plays an important role in Vattimo's notion of "weak thought". He embraced Nietzsche's nihilist idea of God's death.

Vattimo rejected any notion of a transcendental structure of reason or reality that would be given once and for all. This does not imply the loss of truth but rather a Heideggerian reinterpretation of truth as the opening of horizons. Such truth is deeper than propositions, which are made possible by such openings. Philosophies then are always responses to contingent questions, they are "ontologies of actuality", a thesis that can be confirmed by the historico-cultural links of particular philosophies. For hermeneutics to be consistent with its own rejection of metaphysics, Vattimo argues that it must present itself "as the most persuasive philosophical interpretation of a situation or 'epoch'" (1997:10). To do this, Vattimo proposed a reading of hermeneutics as having a "nihilistic" vocation.

To Vattimo, hermeneutics has become boring and vague, lacking any clear significance for philosophical problems. His answer was to insist on the nihilistic consequences of hermeneutics. The claim that "there are no facts only interpretations and this too is an interpretation" amounts to saying that hermeneutics cannot be seen as the most accurate/true description of the permanent structures of the reality of human existence. Hermeneutics is not a metaphysical theory in this sense and so can only be "proved" by being presented as the response to a history of being, a history of the fabling of the world, of the weakening of structures, that is, as the occurrence of nihilism. This nihilistic reading of history involves a certain attitude towards modernity, whereby modernity is dissolved from within through a twisting, distorting radicalisation of its premises. Vattimo uses Heidegger's term Verwindung to capture this post-modern recovery from modernity.

History as a process of weakening (secularisation and disenchantment are other terms Vattimo uses) "assumes the form of a decision for non-violence" (1992:95). According to Vattimo, an ethics of communication along the lines suggested by Habermas suffers from finding itself in a substantially ahistorical position, while oscillating between formalism and cultural relativism (1992:117). For Vattimo, it is only when hermeneutics accepts its nihilistic destiny that "it can find in 'negativity,' in dissolution as the 'destiny of Being' ... the orientating principle that enables it to realize its own original inclination for ethics whilst neither restoring metaphysics nor surrendering to the futility of a relativistic philosophy of culture" (1992:119).

In 2004, after leaving the Democrats of the Left, Vattimo endorsed Marxism, reassessing positively its projection principles and wishing for a "return" to the thought of Karl Marx and a communism rid of distorted Soviet communist developments, which have to be dialectically overcome. Vattimo asserted the continuity of his new choices with the "weak thought", thus having changed "many of his ideas". Speaking of a "weakened Marx", he referred to this as an ideological basis capable of showing the real nature of communism. The new Marxist approach therefore emerged as a practical development of the "weak thought" into the frame of a political perspective.

In Hermeneutic Communism: From Heidegger to Marx (2011), Vattimo's political book co-authored with Santiago Zabala, the authors explain: "Although the material published here had never been released before, there are two books that have determined the production of this text: Gianni's Ecce Comu: Come si diventa cio che si era (2007) and Santiago's The Remains of Being: Hermeneutic Ontology After Metaphysics (2009). In the former, Vattimo emphasized the political necessity of reevaluating communism; in the latter, Zabala insisted on the progressive nature of hermeneutics. Hermeneutic Communism can be considered a radical development of both."

== Views and opinions ==
=== Palestine and Israel ===
Vattimo added his name to a petition released on 28 February 2009, calling on the European Union to remove Hamas from its list of terrorist organisations and grant it full recognition as a legitimate voice of the Palestinian people. On 22 July 2014, in response to Operation Protective Edge, a military operation on Gaza by the Israel Defense Forces (IDF), Vattimo said he would personally like to "shoot those bastard Zionists" and thinks Europeans should raise money "to buy Hamas some more rockets". He expressed his willingness to go to Gaza and fight side by side with Hamas and when asked if he would shoot at Israelis, he asserted, "By nature I'm non-violent, but I'd shoot at those (of them) who bomb hospitals, private clinics and children", before making comparisons between Israel and Nazi Germany. Vattimo added that for him these were "pure Nazis", the state itself a Nazi state (uno Stato nazista), perhaps somewhat worse even than Adolf Hitler's because in Israel's case they have the support of the great Western democracies.

==== Accusations of antisemitism ====
Vattimo had been accused of antisemitism due to his anti-Zionism. Renzo Gattegna, the president of the Union of Italian Jewish Communities, accused him of antisemitism, writing "words of hatred that don't add anything new and are accompanied by the squalid reproposal of anti-Semitic stereotypes". Rabbi Barbara Aiello, Italy's first female rabbi, also accused Vattimo of antisemitism. Reacting to his "Zionist bastards" statements and to others like it, the foreign ministers for Italy, France, and Germany said that they condemn such language as well as the violence that occurred at pro-Palestinian demonstrations in Europe. Pronounced in a moment of indignation against the prolonged bombing of Gaza by the IDF, Vattimo apologised to the Israeli newspaper Haaretz, which reported, "In a telephone interview ... Gianni Vattimo said he 'regrets' such words and 'feels ashamed' by them", claiming he was "provoked" by the hosts of the show on which he made his comments.

== Selected works ==
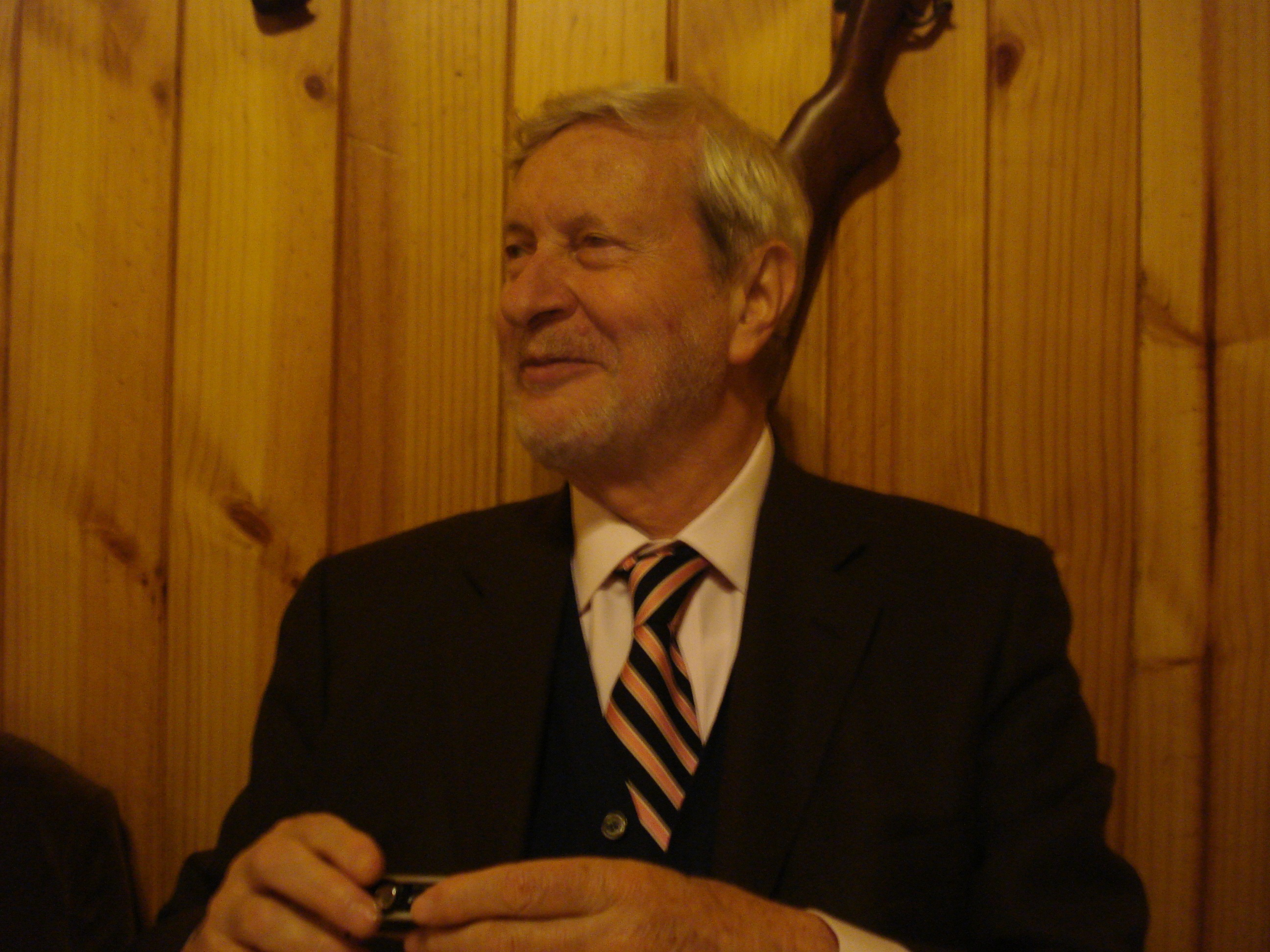
Vattimo in Lima, Perú, 2010

- (1991) The End of Modernity: Nihilism and Hermeneutics in Post-modern Culture, translated by John R. Snyder, Polity Press, 1991. Translation of La fine della modernità, Garzanti, Milan, 1985
- (1992) The Transparent Society, translated by David Webb, Johns Hopkins University Press, 1994. Translation of La società trasparente, Garzanti, Milan, 1989
- (1993) The Adventure of Difference: Philosophy after Nietzsche and Heidegger, translated by Thomas Harrison and Cyprian P. Blamires, Johns Hopkins University Press, 1993. Translation of Le avventure della differenza, Garzanti, Milan, 1980
- (1997) Beyond Interpretation: The Meaning of Hermeneutics for Philosophy, translated by David Webb, Stanford University Press, 1997. Translation of Oltre l'interpretazione, Laterza, Rome-Bari, 1994
- (1998) Religion by Jacques Derrida, edited by Gianni Vattimo, translated by David Webb, Stanford University Press, 1998
- (1999) Belief by Gianni Vattimo, et al., Polity Press, 1999. Translation of Credere di credere, Garzanti, Milan, 1996
- (2002a) Nietzsche: Philosophy as Cultural Criticism, translated by Nicholas Martin Stanford University Press, 2002. Translation of Introduzione a Nietzsche, Laterza, Rome-Bari,1985
- (2002b) After Christianity, New York: Columbia University Press, 2002.
- (2004) Nihilism and Emancipation: Ethics, Politics and Law, edited by Santiago Zabala, Columbia University Press, 2004
- (2005) The Future of Religion, Richard Rorty and Gianni Vattimo, edited by Santiago Zabala, Columbia University Press, 2005
- (2006) After the Death of God, John D. Caputo and Gianni Vattimo, edited by Jeffrey W. Robbins, Columbia University Press.
- (2008) Dialogue with Nietzsche, Gianni Vattimo, Columbia University Press.
- (2008) Art's Claim to Truth, Gianni Vattimo, edited by Santiago Zabala, Columbia University Press.
- (2009) Christianity, Truth, and Weak Faith, Gianni Vattimo and René Girard, edited by P. Antonello, Columbia University Press.
- (2010) The Responsibility of the Philosopher, Gianni Vattimo, edited by Franca D'Agostini, Columbia University Press.
- (2011) Hermeneutic Communism, Gianni Vattimo and Santiago Zabala, Columbia University Press.
- (2012) Weak Thought, translated by Peter Carravetta, SUNY series in Contemporary Italian Philosophy, 2012. Translation of Il pensiero debole, Feltrinelli, Milano, 1983
- (2014) Deconstructing Zionism: A Critique of Political Metaphysics, edited by Gianni Vattimo and Michael Marder, Bloomsbury.

== See also ==
- Anti-Zionism and antisemitism
- Deconstruction
- Post-Marxism
- Postmodern theology
