= Pietro Blayer =

Pietro Blayer (born 1901 — died 24 March 1978 in Rome, Italy) was a notable Jewish Italian community leader. Succeeding Sergio Piperno Beer, Blayer was President of the Union of Italian Jewish Communities from 1976 until his death.
