= Hermeneutic Communism =

2001 book by Gianni Vattimo and Santiago Zabala

Hermeneutic Communism: from Heidegger to Marx
- Authors: Gianni Vattimo; Santiago Zabala
- Language: English
- Published: 2011
- Publisher: Columbia University Press
- Publication place: United States
- Media type: Print
- Pages: 264 (first edition)
- ISBN: 9780231158022 (first edition, hardcover)
- OCLC: 706803950
- Dewey Decimal: 335.401
- LC Class: HX73.V385

Hermeneutic Communism: from Heidegger to Marx is a 2011 book of political philosophy and Marxist hermeneutics by Gianni Vattimo and Santiago Zabala.

== Contents and arguments ==
The authors explain the book as follows "Although the material published here has never been released before, there are two books that have determined the production of this text: Gianni’s Ecce Comu: Come si diventa cio che si era (2007) and Santiago’s The Remains of Being: Hermeneutic Ontology After Metaphysics (2009). In the former, Vattimo emphasized the political necessity of reevaluating communism; in the latter, Zabala insisted on the progressive nature of hermeneutics. Hermeneutic Communism can be considered a radical development of both." In 2004, after leaving the party of the Democrats of the Left, he endorsed Marxism, reassessing positively its projectual principles and wishing for a "return" to the thought of Karl Marx and to a communism, rid of distorted Soviet developments, which have to be dialectically overcome. Vattimo asserts the continuity of his new choices with the "weak thought," thus having changed "many of his ideas." He namely refers to a "weakened Marx," as ideological basis capable of showing the real nature of communism. The new Marxist approach, therefore, emerges as a practical development of the "weak thought" into the frame of a political perspective.

Part 1 of the book is called "Framed Democracy" in which he characterizes contemporary capitalism as "Armed capitalism". Also while analysing current Western parliamentary democracies he speaks of "A politics of descriptions does not impose power in order to dominate as a philosophy; rather, it is functional for the continued existence of a society of dominion, which pursues truth in the form of imposition (violence), conservation (realism), and triumph (history)." Part II is called "Hermeneutic Communism" where he talks of "Interpretation as Anarchy" and affirms that "existence is interpretation" and "hermeneutics is weak thought". Afterwards advocates a "weakened communism" and praises as models for change the contemporary Latin American left wing governments such as those of Hugo Chavez in Venezuela, Evo Morales in Bolivia and Lula in Brazil. For him "this new weak communism differs substantially from its previous Soviet (and current Chinese) realization, because the South American countries follow democratic electoral procedures and also manage to decentralize the state bureaucratic system through the misiones (social missions for community projects). In sum, if weakened communism is felt as a specter in the West, it is not only because of media distortions but also for the altemative it represents through the same democratic procedures that the West constantly professes to cherish but is hesitant to apply".

The authors dedicate the book to "Castro, Chavez, Lula, and Morales."

== Response ==
Hermeneutic Communism received positive reviews from Slavoj Žižek, Ernesto Laclau, and others. In 2017, S. Mazzini and O. Glyn-Williams released a book on Hermeneutic Communism published by Springer Verlag, Making Communism Hermeneutic: Reading Vattimo and Zabala, with critical contributions from 17 renowned scholars from all over the world as well as Vattimo and Zabala's responses.
