= Amos Luzzatto =

Italian-Jewish writer and essayist (1928–2020)

Amoz Luzzatto
- Born: 3 June 1928; Rome, Italy
- Died: 9 September 2020 (aged 92); Venice, Italy
- Occupations: Essayist, Physician
- Children: three
- Relatives: Samuel David Luzzatto-Shadal
- Writing career
- Period: 1990, 2000
- Genres: historical, literary, medical, political, Judaism
- Literary movement: Bialik and Ahad Ha'am

Amos Luzzatto (3 June 1928 – 9 September 2020) was an Italian-Jewish writer and essayist, born in a family of ancient tradition. His mother's father, Dante Lattes, was one of the most important representatives of Jewish Italian culture in the 20th century. His father's great-great-grandfather, Samuel David Luzzatto (Shadal), was teaching at the Rabbinical College in Padua and was an Italian representative of the "Wissenschaft des Judentums".

== Life ==
During his adolescence, he lived in Jerusalem, until 1946. For more than forty years, he worked as a surgeon in several Italian hospitals. He was university lecturer and Chief Physician, he devoted his studies especially to the applications of mathematical systems to the medical-clinical researches.

He liked to be defined "physician – expert in Jewish culture". He insisted above all on modern Jewish identity, which, according to him, has increased the value and has brought affirmation to the category of national identity, together with the "religious" one. Following thinkers like Bialik and Ahad Ha'am, he believed that this national identity should develop in continuity with Jewish history and tradition and urged those who follow this path to master, through studying, not only Hebrew, but also Bible, Midrashic-Talmudic Literature and all its developments until our time.

He translated and commented on the Book of Job (Feltrinelli, 1991) and The Song of Songs (Giuntina, 1997). He wrote How to read Midrash (Morcelliana, 1999), The place of the Jews (Einaudi, 2003) and an interview-book Paths of my life in Judaism, science and politics (Morcelliana, 2003).

He has contributed personal essays in the books Left Wing and Jewish question (Editori Riuniti, 1989), Modern Jews (Bollati-Boringheri, 1989), Besides the Ghetto (Morcelliana, 1992) and Annali Einaudi- Storia degli Ebrei d'Italia, vol. II (Einaudi, 1997).

He took part with personal reports in several and international conferences on Jewish culture subjects. He held a course on Jewish Literature and the Midrash at the University of Venice, Department of Religious History. At the same university, he organized the "Socrates European Master in Archaeology and the Dynamics of Writing", regarding the Jewish aspect of this subject. At Roma Tre University, he held a course on Midrash within the History of Religions and a Laboratory on the dynamics of prejudice.

He was editor-in-chief of the Rassegna Mensile d'Israel.

From June 1998 to February 2006, he was the President of the Union of Italian Jewish Communities.

Today many events are held in the name of Amos Luzzatto to celebrate Holocaust Remembrance Days.

== Bibliography ==
- Ebrei moderni (Modern Jews) (Bollati-Boringheri, 1989).
- Sinistra e questione ebraica (Left Wing and Jewish question) (Editori Riuniti, 1989).
- Oltre il Ghetto (Besides the Ghetto) (Morcelliana, 1992).
- Annali Einaudi – Storia degli ebrei d'Italia, vol. II, Annals/Encyclopaedic work on the Jews in Italy (Einaudi, 1997).
- Leggere il Midrash (How to read Midrash) (Morcelliana, 1999).
- Una vita tra ebraismo, scienza e politica (Paths of my life in Judaism, science and politics) (Morcelliana, 2003).
- Il posto degli ebrei (The place of the Jews) (Einaudi, 2003).
- La leggenda di Concobello (The Concobello Legend) (Mursia, 2006).
