= Union of Italian Jewish Communities =

National association in Italy

Geographic distribution of communities in Italy

The Union of Italian Jewish Communities (Italian: Unione delle comunità ebraiche italiane, UCEI) is a national association that represents over twenty Jewish community associations in Italy.

== History ==
The organisation was founded in 1911 as the Comitato delle università israelitiche, which became the Consorzio delle comunità israelitiche italiane in 1920 and the Unione delle comunità israelitiche italiane in 1930. The current name was adopted in 1987.

In November 2026, a measure to adopt the IHRA definition of antisemitism was passed by the lower house of the Italian Parliament by a 147-93 margin, with the support of Italian prime minister Giorgia Meloni. Livia Ottolenghi, president of the Union of Italian Jewish Communities, called the measure necessary to protect democracy, saying that "the fight against antisemitism is not a partisan battle, but a battle for society as a whole".

== Jewish community association locations represented by the Union ==
- Ferrara
- Ancona
- Casale Monferrato
- Florence
- Genoa
- Livorno
- Mantua
- Merano
- Milan
- Modena
- Naples
- Padua
- Parma
- Pisa
- Rome
- Turin
- Trieste
- Venice
- Vercelli
- Varese

== Presidents ==
- Livia Ottolenghi (2026-present)
- Noemi Di Segni (2016 to 2026)
- Renzo Gattegna (2006 to 2016)
- Amos Luzzatto (1998 to 2006)
- Tullia Zevi (1983 to 1998)
- Pietro Blayer (1976 to 1978)
