= Antonio Diego Voci =

Italian painter

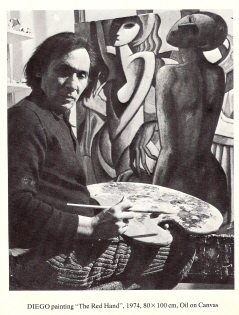
- Antonio Diego Voci 1974
- Born: 10 August 1920; Gasperina, Calabria, Italy
- Died: 10 December 1985 (aged 65); Taunusstein, Germany
- Education: Florence Academy of Arts
- Known for: Painting, drawing, sculpture
- Notable work: Poor People, Death in Battle, La Violenza, Miraculous Catch, Promenade, Valiant Stallion (See Gallery)
- Movement: Surrealism Impressionism Cubism Figurative Realism

Antonio Diego Voci (10 August 1920 – 10 December 1985) was an Italian painter and sculptor. He was an internationally collected figurative artist with the largest group of owners of his works residing in Switzerland, England, Germany, Italy, Canada and the United States; as well as various works scattered the world over. Although constantly drawing or painting from childhood to the day he succumbed to lung cancer, Diego's most productive period was the last quarter century of his life which began when he met Helga Drössler in January 1960 in Paris. A significant turning point in Diego's career, Diego said, "My life took on new meaning. I became more." Helga who became Diego's wife, lover, best friend and confidant, published seven chapters of her life with Diego on Artifact Collectors. Within those 25 abundant years Diego created 4000 oils, mostly on canvas, and many thousands of drawings.

"Each movement had its great masters, but there are very few who could create art unconfined by a single style like Diego." – Christopher Voci

Diego was a versatile artist who worked across multiple modernist and classical movements, including Impressionism, Cubism, Surrealism, Realism (arts) and Fauvism. His work largely focused on figurative art, exploring the complexity of the human form, facial expressions and natural anatomy. A central theme in his work is the interplay between human desire and physical strength, often contrasted against an innate instinct of resistance.

== 1920–1938: early life ==
Antonio Diego Voci (VOH-chee), the youngest of 3 brothers was born Antonio Innocenzo Voci on 10 August 1920 in the mountainous region near Catanzaro, Italy, in the small village of Gasperina, to Giuseppantonio Voci and Arcangela Messina Voci, a Catholic family of modest means. From childhood Diego felt compelled to draw as constantly and effortlessly as he drew a breath, endowed by nature to do both. At an early age Diego took charge of his own life direction. Diego proudly boasted his independent, I'll-do-it-myself spirit when at age eight, he carved his own religious statue when his father would not buy the one he wanted in a Rome store window. Diego was called on in school for art, design and decoration projects. By age 12 he was awarded a year scholarship to a design school. Diego proudly recalled that in his youth religious artist Antonino Calcagnadoro (1876–1935) let him help paint a church fresco. Diego studied sculpture and painting for three years at Lycee d'Art, followed by studies of Greek and Latin, as well as tailoring.

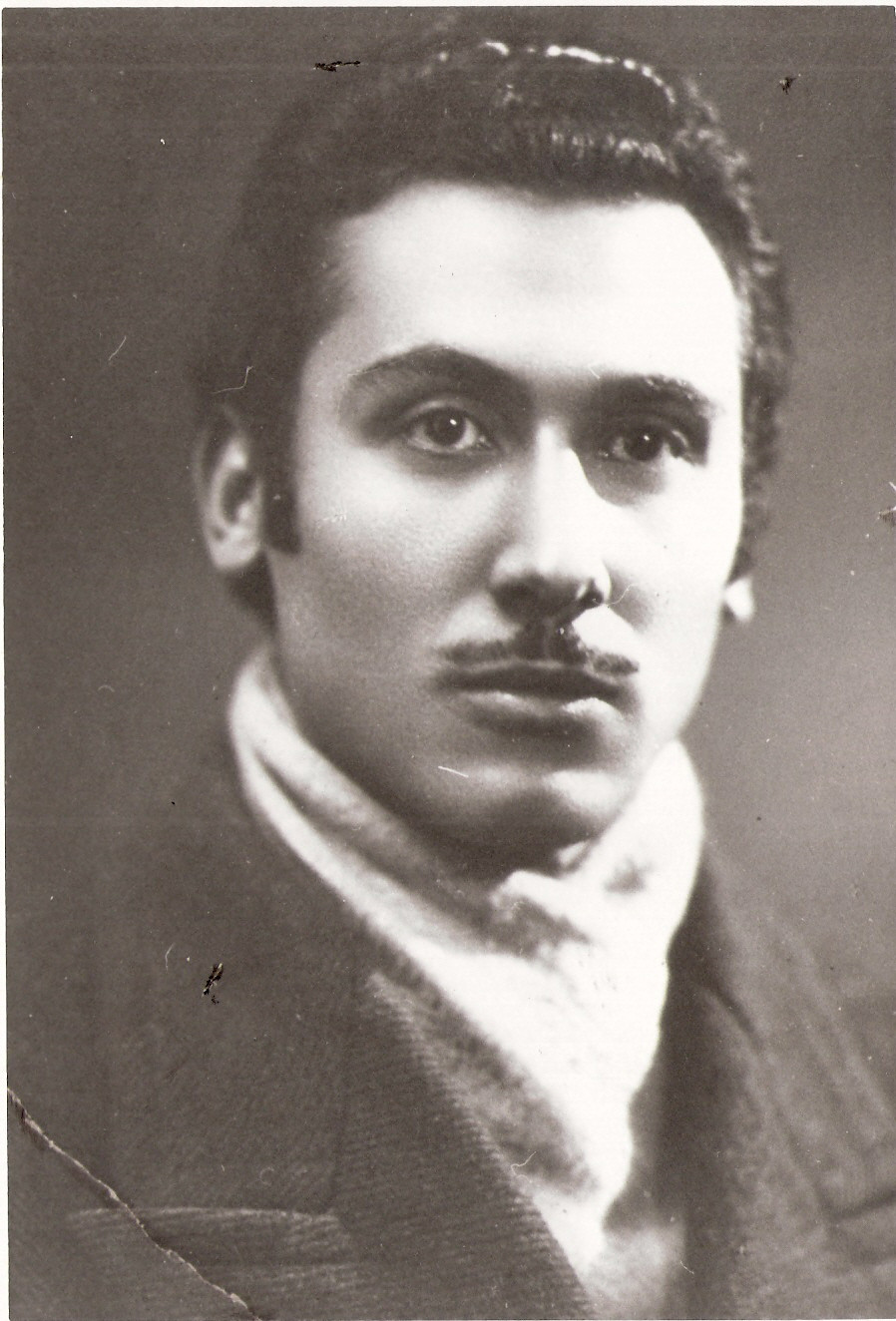
Diego Voci dressed in fashion of his own design and tailoring; he also adorned ladies of his liking

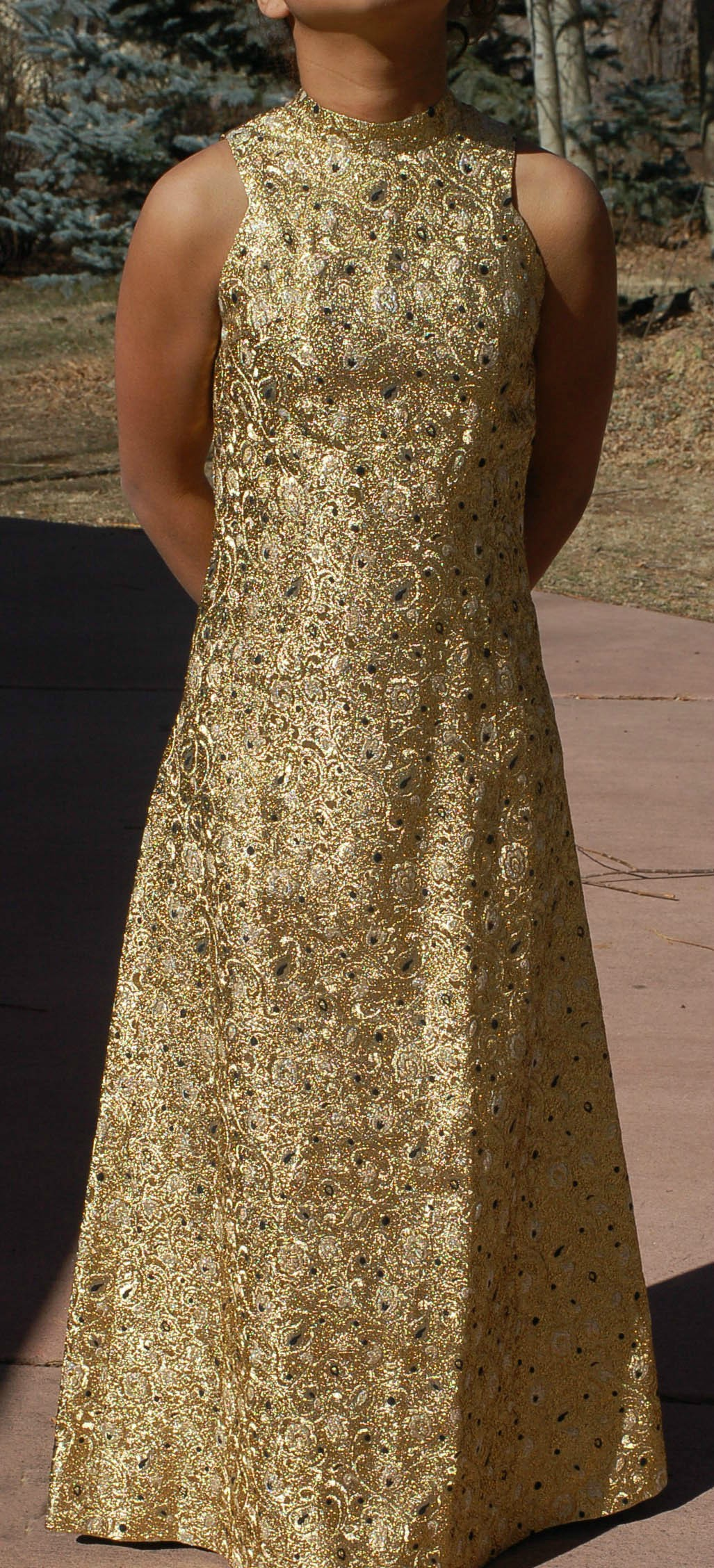
Gift for the Brown Family daughters, a fully lined gold brocade dress designed and sewn by Diego

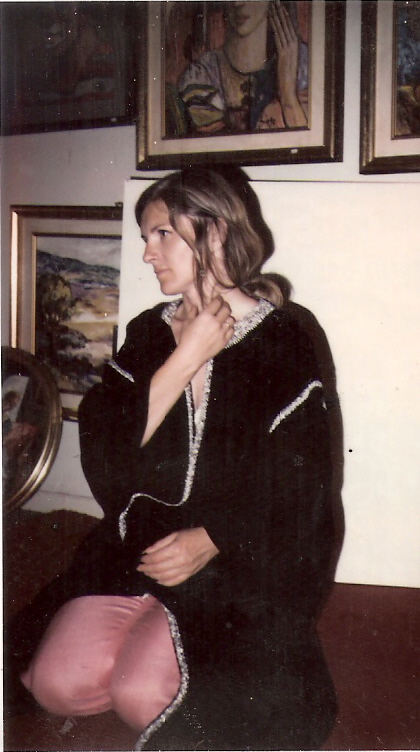
Helga Voci posing in a full length cape with silver trim DIEGO made and designed, fully lined

All three Voci boys were sent to Reggio to study tailoring. In December 1920, four months after Diego's birth, their father took the oldest brother Vincenzo, age 15, to Philadelphia where they both worked as tailors. For 3 ½ years Messina Arcangela raised "Toto", her pet name for Diego, until her husband came back to Gasperina with enough money to open a dry goods store. In 1930, Vincenzo returned to Italy to marry 17-year-old Anna Spadea, (born 1913 Gasperina) whom he took back to Philadelphia continuing as one of the area's finest tailors and designer for Pincus Manufacturing. The middle brother, Giuseppe became a professional musician and played in the Rome Orchestra.

Diego sold his first painting at age 18. Typical of most parents, Giuseppantonio, encouraged his son to follow in his traditional profession, "Toto [Diego], the God of Art does not give bread." But the compulsion in Diego for art was too strong, the pleasure too rewarding, "'I was born to paint." And paint he did in the thousands, and drawings beyond count. In addition to his vast array of artworks, Diego would also design and make his own clothes as an adult, and for the ladies of his liking.

Diego relied on himself for money. All members of the Voci family agree Diego never received financing from the family, and that he never worked at any occupation other than art. Upon venturing out on his own Diego summoned his practical side to employ his art talent to works of art he knew the public would quickly buy, to raise money or trade for food, bed, paint and canvas, and to finance his study, to expand knowledge, experience and skill. Also to enjoy pleasures in life, and sports. (Diego was a competitive cyclist in high school.) His time to create his own masterworks would come later.

== 1939–1948: school and WWII ==
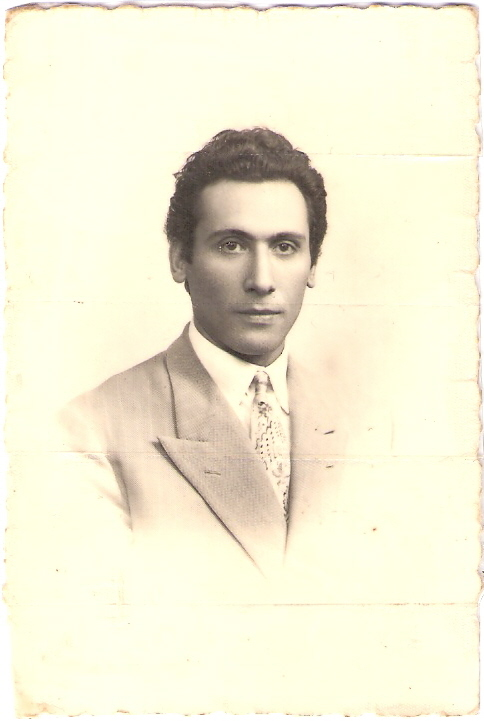
Diego one month before his 26th birthday in a suit made by his brother Giuseppe, taken in Rome on a break from Florence Academy of Fine Arts

Art schools and World War II military service in the Italian Army would consume Diego's life through 1948. At 19 Diego enrolled at the Florence Academy of Arts in San Marco Piazza. At 20 his art studies were interrupted by World War II.

1945 with the war over, Diego then returned to the Florence Academy of Arts for 3 years studying the classic styles of sculpture and painting of Donatello, Leonardo, Michelangelo and many others.

=== World War II POW: art was the key to survival ===
During World War II, Diego was sent to the front lines as an Italian Army soldier to fight against the Germans. Conditions were horrible. When he came home on leave Diego's mother Messina Arcangela had to boil her son's uniform to get rid of the lice infestation. On his return Diego was captured and sent to a German Prisoner of War Camp in North Germany. With luck or ingenuity or both, Diego the survivor befriended the German Camp Commander who was so impressed with Diego's artistic talents, he moved Diego to his quarters to live and make paintings and caricatures. Diego enjoyed those privileges until the end of the war. It is generally believed that Diego also befriended an American Officer who was a prisoner in the same camp which led to the important contribution the American Military Community would play in Diego's career providing a reliable source of income. Diego's works were likely signed "Voci", as it was not until 1965/6 the "Diego" signature was prominently used.

In 1948 Diego moved to Paris to further his education at Ecole des Beaux-Arts. In Paris Diego learned "the real academy is the café, study people, meet so many artists."

Diego thrived on camaraderie, as did other artists before him, such as Amedeo Modigliani, both "figurative" artists, both Italian born, both migrated to Paris. Among Diego's many facets was a drive never to be poor, never to live a tormented drug ridden life of Amedeo Modigliani who at age 35 "died in Paris exacerbated by poverty only one exhibition to his credit." or the tortured life of Vincent van Gogh who died at age 37, with only one painting purchased in his lifetime. Diego greatly admired the exceptional work of both artists, but, unlike both artists who found few buyers for their work, in their lifetime, Diego did for his.

=== Diego's influences ===
Professor Felice Carena (1879–1966), who was one of Italy's great religious artists displayed in Museum of Modern Religious Art in Rome, was a mentor for Diego. Diego in his youth also worked as an assistant to Antonino Calcagnadoro (1876–1935), who was known for his church frescos. Diego admired Renoir, Cézanne, Degas, Modigliani and Van Gogh. There was a reluctance in Diego to pinpoint his early inspiration. When asked in 1973 Diego said, "Michelangelo is the greatest. There are so many. Leonardo da Vinci, Botticelli, Rembrandt. And Miró, Chagall, Picasso. So many."

== 1949–1959 the painter explorer ==
=== Venice ===
The powerful urge was deep in Diego's DNA to explore the world and its people to capture in art all that it offered. During Diego's extensive travels he said "I was always painting, always learning ...to fill a need to express."

1949 Diego established his home base in Venice, where he would paint, travel and return. That need to explore the world took Diego to Spain, Portugal, North Africa, Turkey, England and Scandinavia. Canadian Art Dealer, Joy Gibson Naffouj wrote, "Diego displayed his work often...displaying his work in Torino, Capri and Venice. His first one man show was at the Galleria La Bussula in Torino." In 1951 the city of Venice sponsored a competition, a showcase for Italian artists. Carlo Carrà (1881–1966) noted figure of the Futurist movement and arguably the most important Italian artist at the time, won first prize. Diego won second prize. Also, in 1951 Diego had a one-man show in Switzerland and painted for galleries who represented master artists including Rembrandt, Renoir, and Monet. Diego was commissioned to do frescos, sculptures, relief sculptures and canvases by private collections, Italian restaurants, and galleries throughout Europe. After his one-man show in Lugano in 1953, Diego travelled continuously stopping to show in Milan, Rome and Genoa.

=== First marriage ===
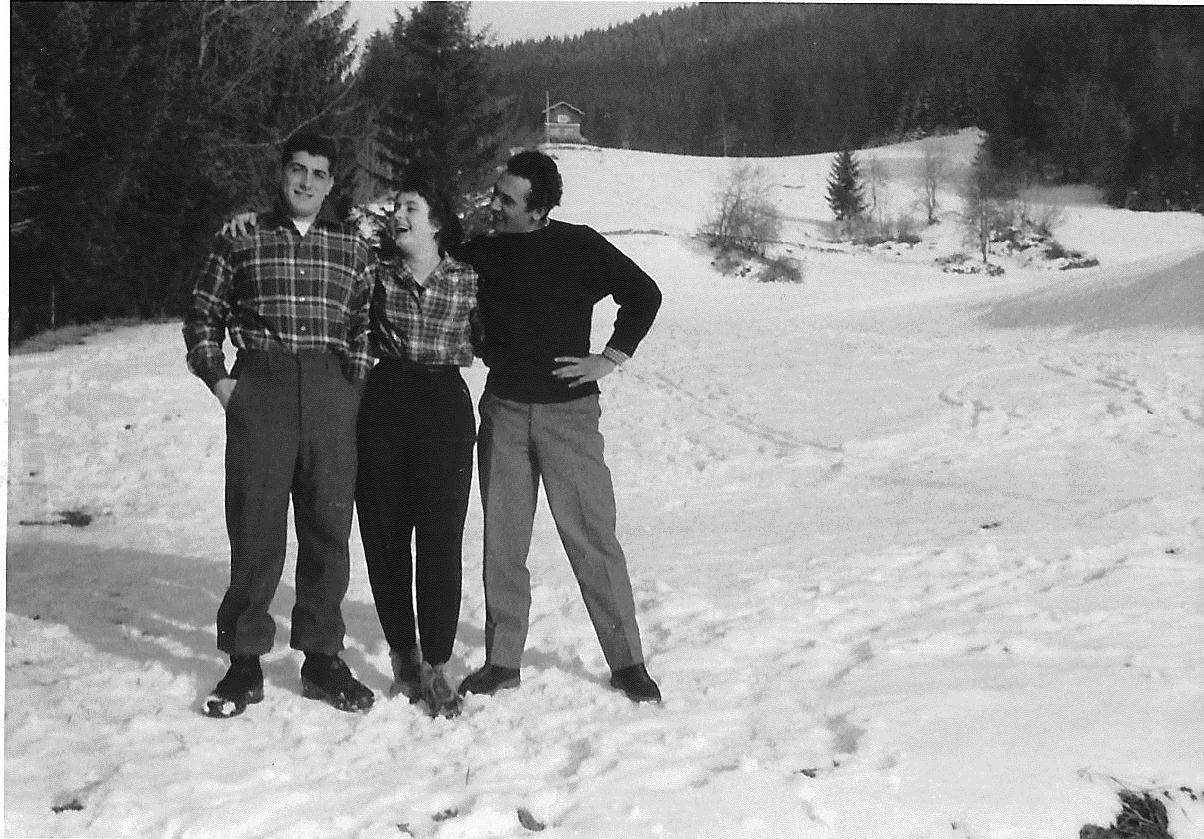
Anthony (Tony) Voci, Josiane Schäfer Voci, 1st wife Diego at Mont Blanc

Also in 1953, Diego met 16-year-old Josiane Schäfer, a ski instructor and daughter of a well-to-do Swiss family, who at 18 would become Mrs. Voci. The Schäfer family owned a mountain cabin for skiing.

=== Diego travels with nephew ===
In 1956, Diego moved to Wiesbaden, Germany with his first wife Josiane. Diego's American nephew, Anthony (Tony) Voci, son of Vincenzo, was stationed at Wurzburg U.S. Army Base as a Tank Commander. Tony was impressed that Diego knew the Base Commander and obtained leave time for him. Diego showed Tony the portraits of Officers he was commissioned to do, but said, "That is not art!"

Anthony spent much of his free time touring Germany, Switzerland and Northern Italy with Diego. Tony said, "Anytime there was an espresso sign we stopped. Everybody knew Diego. He would sketch the waitress on a napkin and hand it to her. Diego would paint or sketch nearly every waking minute while traveling together."

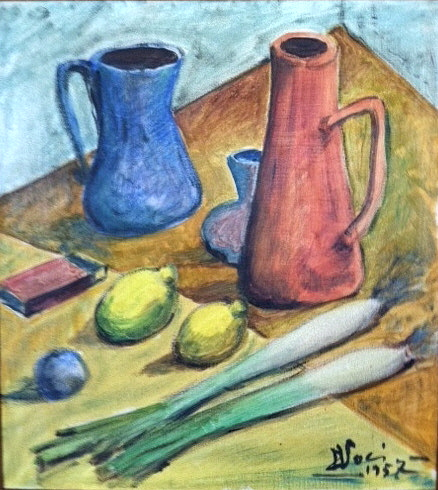
"You are hungry?", 18" x 24", 1957, Oil on Canvas, signed "DVoci1957"

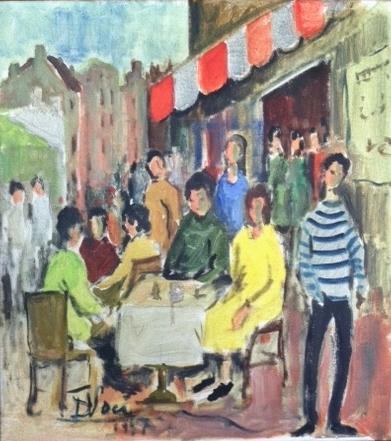
"Café Scene"1957, gouache. signed "DVoci1957"

It is notable that Anthony Voci is the only known person identified to date that is in possession of any art work by Diego from childhood to 1957. Tony recalls on their travels together through Europe, he said "I'm hungry". Diego stopped and said "You are hungry? I paint you something to eat.", and minutes later gave Tony a memento of his time when his uncle played a joke on him. Tony, at 93, is living in Philadelphia where this gift from Diego is displayed.

Another day, Diego swiftly completed a gouache of a Paris "Café Scene" as a second gift to his nephew, also dated 1957, and signed "D. Voci", which Tony since gave to his son, Chris Voci. View serious works by Diego in Gallery Section.

== 1960–1985 life with Helga Drössler Voci ==
=== Paris ===
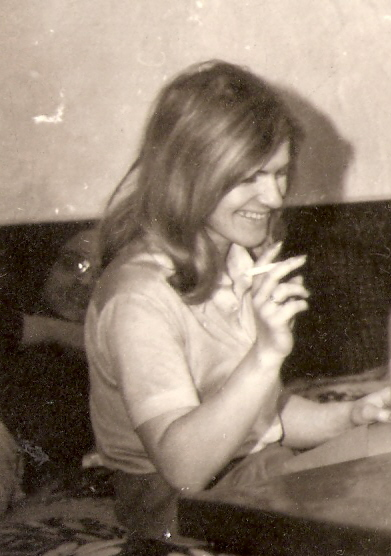
Helga Drössler

The 25 years of Diego Voci with Helga Drössler Voci (born in Prague in 1939) were by every standard his best contributing years to the world of art. The following paragraph is excerpted from "HELGA and DIEGO" Chapter Two

I decided to go back to Paris in January 1960 to study for another period. Shortly after that I met Diego one Sunday afternoon my girlfriend Eve and I were sitting in Les Deux Magots, a very famous coffeehouse which was frequented by many artists such as Pablo Picasso and writer Ernest Hemingway. The famous Italian sculptor, Gigi Guadagnucci (whom we had already known from before) entered together with Diego (had never seen before) and they came to sit at our table. We had a nice chat and some time later they left. Okay, this was the beginning of a 25 years lasting love, we stayed together until December 1985 when Diego died of lung cancer. In Paris we stayed until October 1960. We had a wonderful time, I became acquainted with another part of Paris, we went to fantastic Restaurants, we met very interesting people, many artists, long discussions in – La Coupole-another famous place, that was frequented by such artists as Yves Klein (painter), Jean-Paul Sartre and Simone de Beauvoir (both writers) and many others. Diego was living in a small Hotel near the Seine, he did not really work, just a few sketches from time to time and I was wondering how he was financing his living. He made a big secret about his finances. He spent quite a lot of money, he had a big car and he hardly worked. From time to time he went off from Paris for a few days or a week and then everything went on again. He told me that he was separated from his wife Josiane, maiden name Schäfer, she was from Geneva, Switzerland. I know that he had been living with her for some time in Geneva and also in Wiesbaden but how he made his living at that time I don't know. Whether he was painting or not, he never talked about it.

=== Diego Voci and caricatures ===
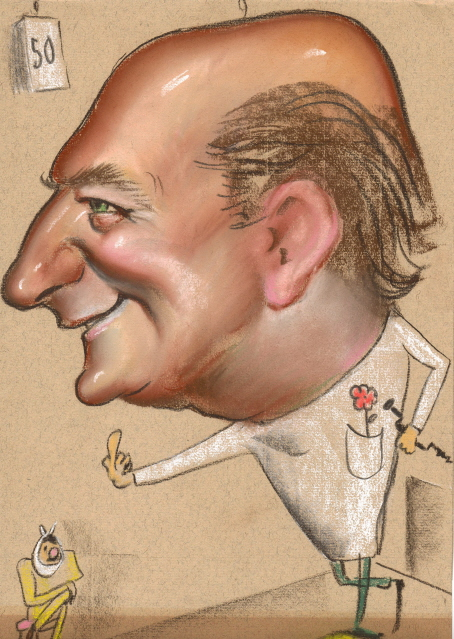
Caricature of Dr. Franz Brandl, Helga Voci's stepfather

Diego was popular in the World War II POW Camp doing caricatures and portraits Connections Diego made with the American prisoners led to Diego's later cash flow source in the American Officer's Clubs that dotted Europe after WWII. Moreover, Diego considered the practice of caricatures that he swiftly and superbly executed to be an excellent study of people and faces, his favorite subjects.

Helga Voci describes her discovery,

Some time later I found out that Diego was doing caricatures in American Officers Clubs in France, Germany and later on also in London and Spain. He did wonderful caricatures, it took him only a few minutes to do each one and people were crazy about them, they stood in line waiting for their turn. He made a lot of money with this, I`m sure there are still many Officers who remember him. When I said to him why was he not painting or only a little, he said that he was studying people and he would start later on.

=== Southern Europe and London ===
Summer of 1960 in Paris, Helga fell ill where she was hospitalized for 3 months with Diego at her side, at which time Diego officially registered as a resident of Paris. Diego took Helga to South France to relax in "very good hotels" for recovery until the holiday season. Helga went to Bavaria to be with her family. Diego went to London to rent a furnished apartment in Soho where Helga joined him in January. Diego painted.

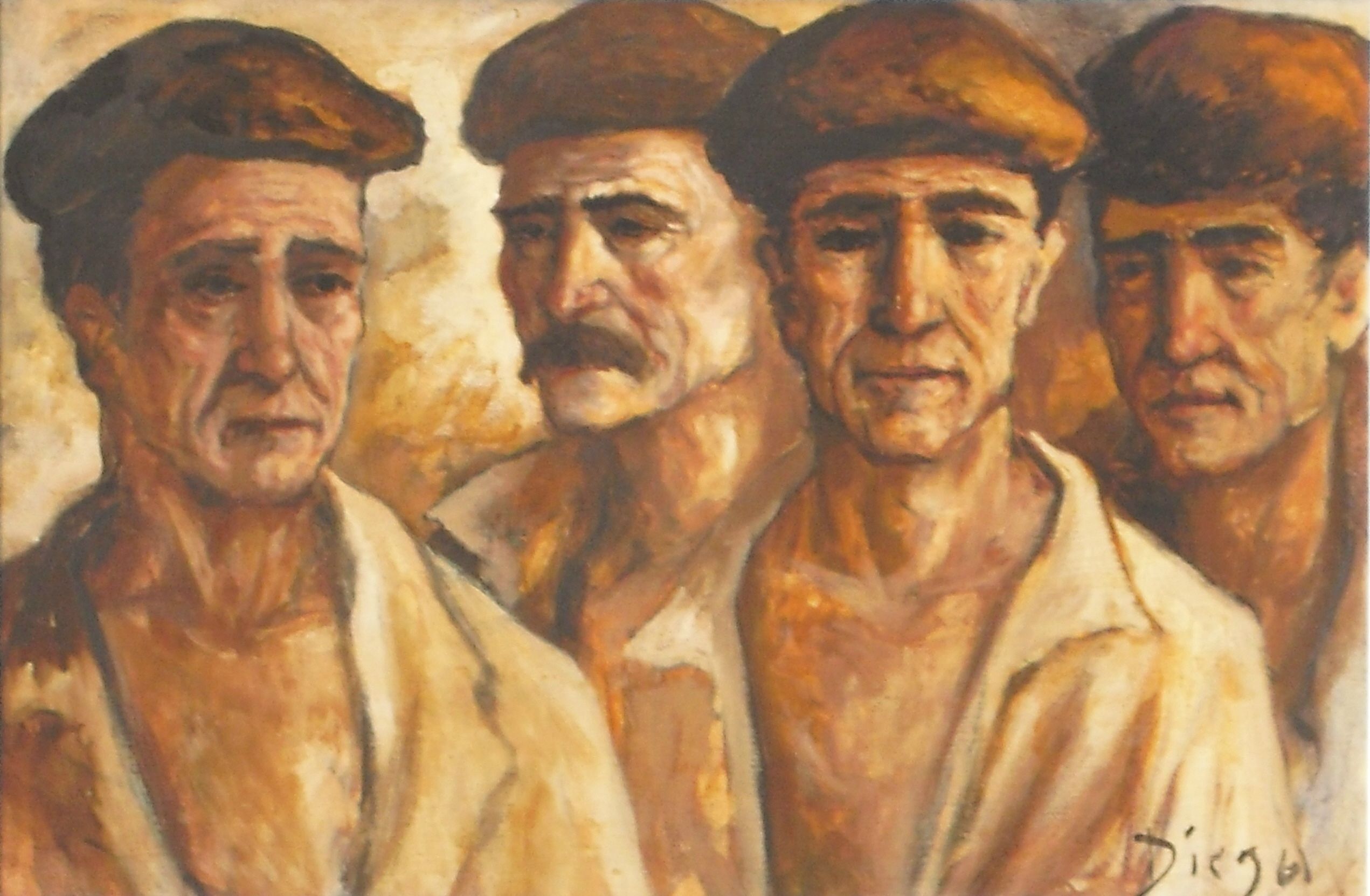
"Fisherman", 1966, 34" x 35 ¾", oil on canvas, Naffouj Frame, Private Collection

By fall 1961 Diego wanted to escape London weather. They spent until January 1962 in a little fishing village in Spain called Almunecar, an artist's colony. Diego painted, and played cards with fisherman and studied the village people he would portray from memory (example on left). Diego said he never copies. He creates from his vast library of mental images collected from international travels and mingling with everyday people.

February 1962, their next stop was Morocco and while there Diego received a commission in Marrakesh at the American Officer's Club. Diego traveled throughout Morocco while Helga took a job at a travel agency in Lugano, Switzerland. On the way to meet Helga in Lugano, Diego made arrangements for Globart in Milan to show his paintings. August 1962, Diego joined Helga in Switzerland renting a boathouse on Lake Constance.

=== Schlossgalerie Zurich ===
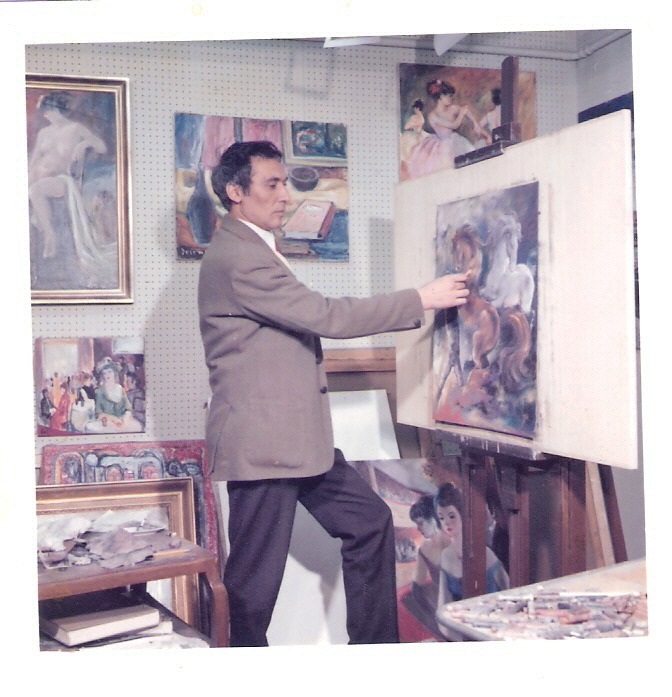
Diego Painting in Schlossgalerie - Zurich - Kunststudio 1963

A notable event for Diego in the fall of 1962 was the agreement he made with Schlossgalerie in Zurich under the name "Antonio Voci" (no Diego) to sell his paintings to their wealthy patrons, many of whom were horse aficionados. Schlossgalerie provided Diego a studio. He signed his works "A. Voci"

Helga Voci said, "The owner [R. Buri] sold quite many paintings." During this time Diego also went to Aviano Air Force Base to sell paintings and would do caricatures in the Officer's club.

=== JFK ===
In 1963, a painting by Diego signed "Voci" was selected by an Air Force Officer from the 526th Tactical Interceptor Squadron (later renamed 526th Tactical Fighter Sq.) and flown from Aviano Air Force Base to Wiesbaden. On the evening of 25 June 1963, the painting was presented to President John F. Kennedy at the General Von Steuben Hotel. The President left Wiesbaden the next morning for Berlin for his famous "Ich bin ein Berliner"speech.

=== Return to Italy ===
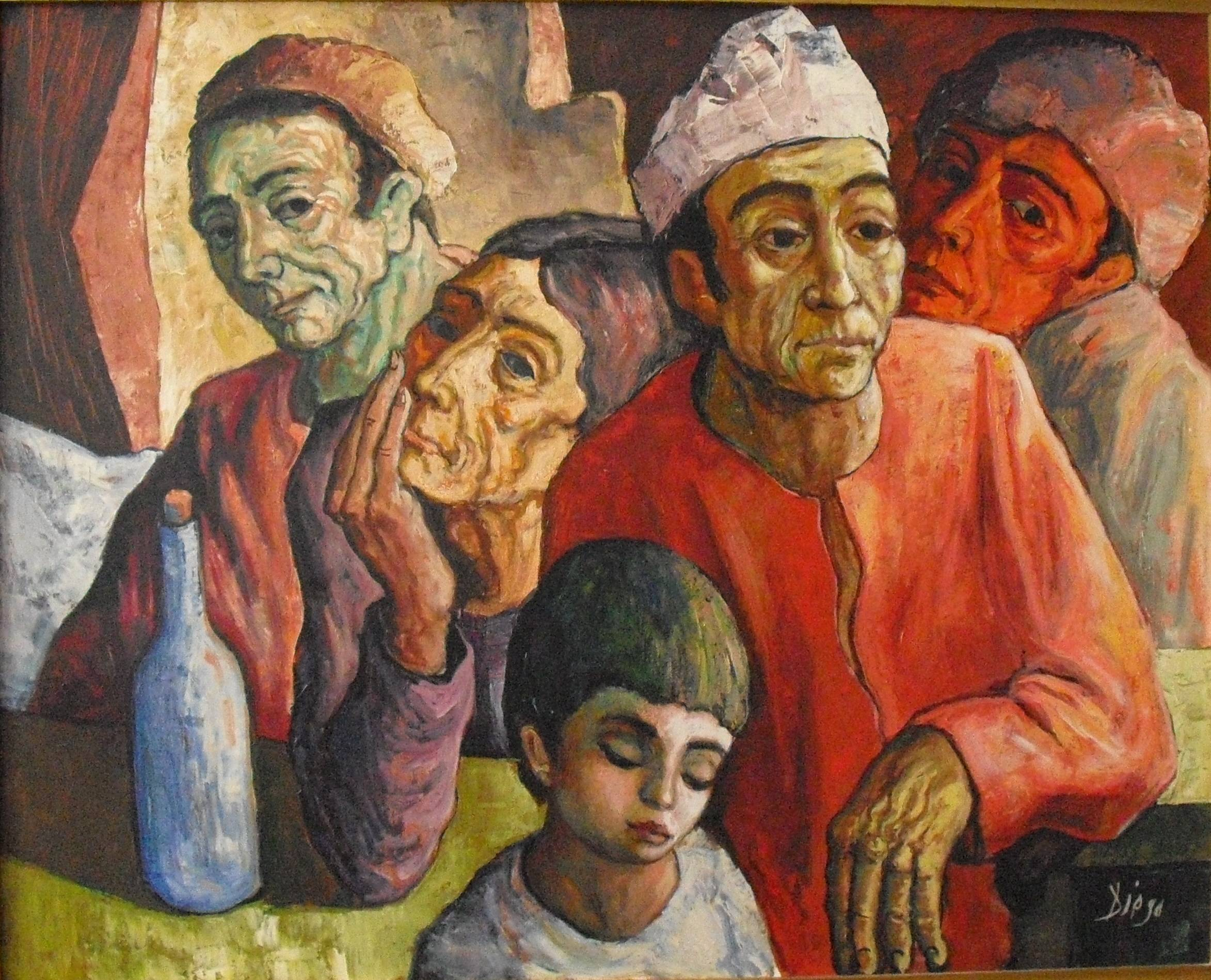
"Italienische Arbeiterfamilie", 31 ½" x 39 ¼" oil on canvas, Private Collection

Diego longed to leave Switzerland to return to the warmer southern country where he felt more at ease and more inspired to paint. As Victoria Williams wrote in the TV Guide, "Where people gather in groups to talk on the street, play games in the yard, sit in parks, lovers, strangers, the poor, the rich, mothers, fathers, children, happy people, sad people. These are the subjects of Diego."

Helga Voci wrote,

We left Zurich for Italy in July 1963, stayed sometime in Milan, Florence and Rome. When we came to a small medieval town in Northern Italy called Asolo (1,000 inhabitants) we rented an apartment in a very old house in the middle of town with a big terrace. Diego made his first real studio. He mostly sold in Zurich with the Schlossgalerie. But, he also worked with Globart Kunstgalerie in Milano.

=== Germany – Naffouj and Dahms galleries ===
The sequence of four women entering Diego's life and the impact on Diego's success cannot be overestimated. First, 1960 was Helga for 25 years. Then, in 1965 Joy Gibson, a Canadian art dealer opened a location in Zweibrucken, Germany between the Canadian (RCAF) and the American Air Force bases. As Diego's agent for seven years, she with assistance of Dr. Jawdat Naffouj who became her husband, opened Naffouj Galerie in Landstuhl which Jawdat ran until his passing in January 2023. His current wife Bridget and his son Jabby continue to represent Diego and other artists. The Naffouj's introduced the iconic Diego signature which dominated Diego works for the next two decades. They turned art buyers into devoted Diego collectors throughout Germany, USA and Canada. Dr. Naffouj also published Diego's stone-cut lithographs in Urbino, Italy. In 1972, Lillian Dussard who worked for Naffouj Galerie, became Diego's agent to the Department of Defense locations until she went to US and opened her own gallery in Stafford, Virginia. In 1974 Christine Kahn took over the agent responsibilities for Diego for the next decade. All 3 women worked closely with Helga. Christine and Helga's friendship continues into present time.

Diego ceased working with Schlossgalerie when Helga and Diego moved in 1965 to Wiesbaden, Germany. Diego continued to take trips to Italy where he received a commission from Alfa Romeo in 1966. He also made a connection with the luxurious Galerie Dahms located on the prestigious Wilhelmstrasse of Wiesbaden that would last for many years.

Owner Siegfred Dahms wrote,

Diego is one of the few artistic personalities whose paintings really appeal to the German people. They understand, they get excited about, and they really enjoy living with Diego's art. The beauty of his paintings and the desire of possession are often so immense that people gradually acquire more and more of his work.

NOTE: A very large Diego painting is known to have been sold in 1978 by Herr Siegfred Dahms for DM15,000 (Dahms Galerie, Wiesbaden).

In 1965, Diego leased an apartment for five years in Wiesbaden. Diego also made a 5-year agreement with Naffouj Galerie in Landstuhl for so many paintings for so much per month. Joy Naffouj said, "To watch Diego paint is magical. His hand moves so fast it is blurred to the eye."

Helga wrote:

We finally decided to marry, which we did in January 1968 in Denmark. As Diego did not have to bother anymore about how to sell his paintings, we decided to spend the winter in the Canary Islands. We took our car in December 1968, with lots of canvases and paints of many colors. We went to Barcelona and took the boat to Puerto de la Cruz (Tenerife). We rented a little house on top of a big house with a very big terrace. We had a beautiful view over the ocean. We had wonderful 6 months. Diego painted each day. Once a month we made a roll of the canvases and sent them to Joy (nee Gibson) and Dr. Jawdat Naffouj in Landstuhl, Germany.

After five years, in 1970, recognizing Diego's significant talent, Dr. Jawdat Naffouj wanted assurance for future Diego artwork so a written guarantee contract went into effect signed, "Antonio Diego", this is the only evidence of the name Diego in a document signature from birth until 1976 when he registered in Taunusstein. In March 1970, to prepare for a one-man exhibit in Ravenna, Italy at Galleria Cairoli in October, Diego and Helga rented a villa enjoying the Italian lifestyle along the Adrian Sea in Riccione, while still rolling up mailing painted canvases to the Naffouj Galerie.

After the exhibit, Diego and Helga headed to Bavaria, Germany to assist Helga's parents with the interior design of their newly constructed home where art by Diego remains today; sculpted fireplace and sculpted copper front door. They stayed and rented an apartment from late 1970 until mid-1972. In 1971, the University of Wisconsin received two Diego paintings from the Norman Marohn collection for the Polk Library. In 1972, Schwetzingen, Germany became their home. There Diego and Helga had a daughter, Alessandra, cared for by a nanny from India who stayed with them until 1985. Diego ended his guarantee-of-exclusivity contract with Naffouj Galerie in 1972 and continued travelling exhibitions with Lillian Dussard assisting. A sales relationship continued with Naffouj until 1979 and with Galerie Dahms until 1985.

=== Exhibitions in the US ===
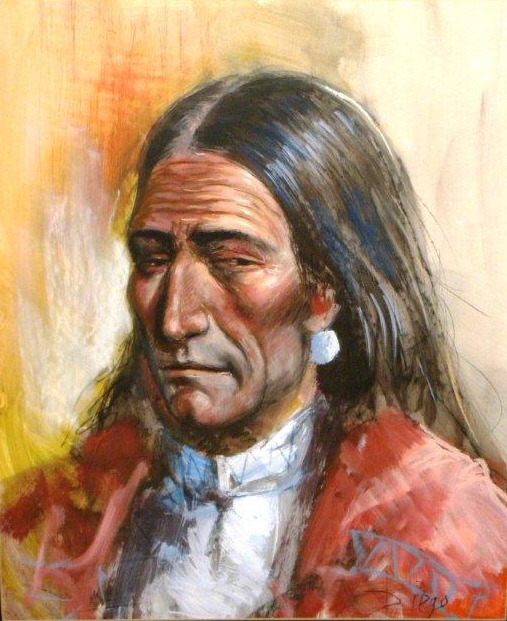
Diego's drawing of a Native American, 24 x 20 in, Private Collection

Diego and Helga's first trip to the US was in 1973. Diego was asked to come to Colorado for an exhibition by Dr. Ogden Brown, an avid Diego collector that he met in Germany.

The Voci's, who had no knowledge of credit cards, bought a used station-wagon with cash on the east coast to travel cross country. A solo show of Diego's work was successfully presented in November 1973, by Dr. Brown's daughter Marsha Largent at the Broadmoor Hotel in Colorado Springs. The travels throughout the US expanded Diego's versatility in compositions. Diego was deeply moved by the Native American Indian in New Mexico which he translated to drawings and canvases.

=== In the news ===
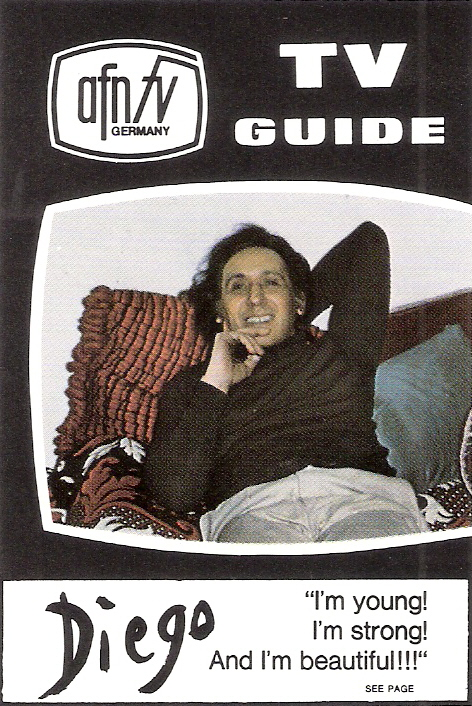
Preliminary TV Guide Cover

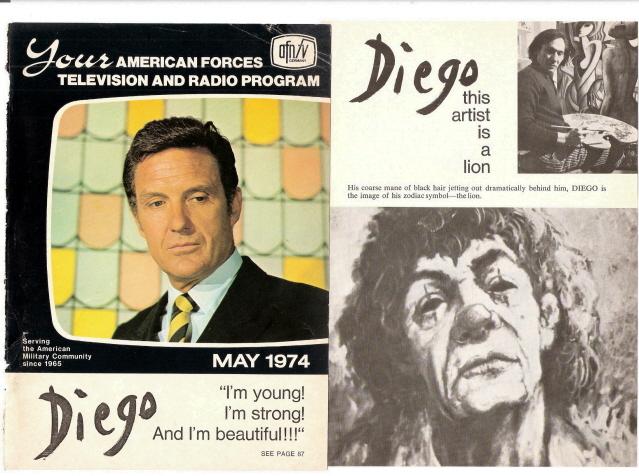
Diego cover pre-empted by Robert Stack. 3-page V. Williams article on Diego remained

In 1973/4 the introduction of writer, Victoria Williams, and John Krueger, a writer for Stars & Stripes newspaper through Diego collector Coop Cooprider, widened Diego's audience.

This included a live AFN TV interview on Women's World (while Diego was creating sketches), a published article in AFN TV guide, an 8-page glossy catalog capturing some of the Diego's masterworks, advertisements in Art News and an article by Walter Trott in Stars and Stripes. Although Coop's volunteer working relationship ended in mid-1974, he and wife Patti continued to add to their Diego collection and kept in contact for several years later.

=== The final decade ===
The last 10 years of Diego's life, his representation grew widespread from Galerie Dahms in Wiesbaden, Naffouj Galerie in Landstuhl, to Talbert's Gallery, Washington, US, and Glen Burnie Gallery, Maryland, US. In addition, in Canada exhibitions for Diego in 1981 were held at Goldcrest Galleries, Toronto; Stephen and wife Wendy Max, Alberta; and the Van Zoolingen Gallery in Edmonton. And others such as, Salon Panetta in Manheim, Germany, with Gallerist Fausto Panetta (Rome region native), where over 20 Diegos sold in one exhibition.

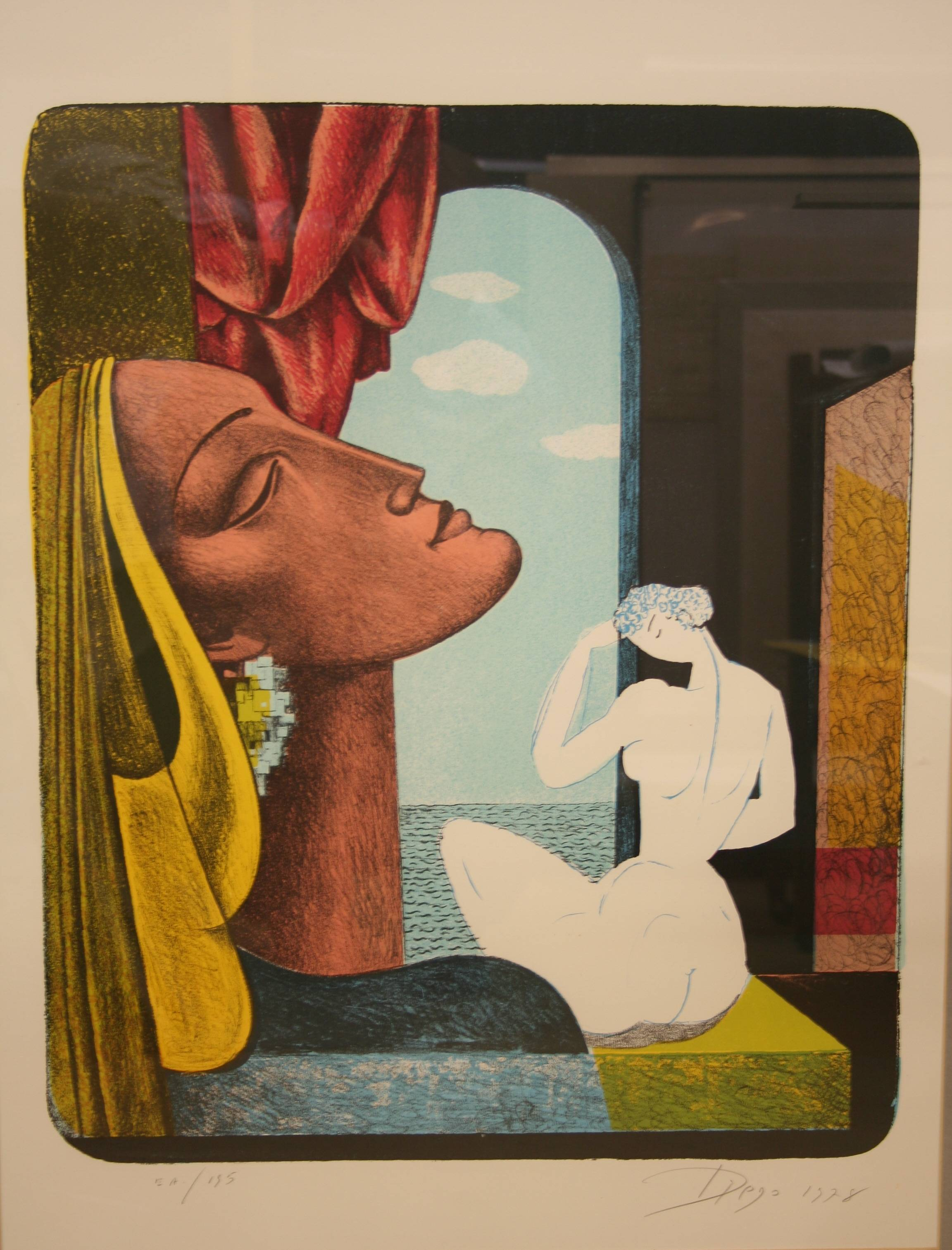
Lithograph. Ragazza al mare (1978), 31 ½" x 24, Private Collection

As Diego's acclaim grew, he ventured into publishing another series of prints handmade on special litho stones in Urbino, Italy in 1979, financed by Naffouj Galerie. Each of the stone-cut lithographs created in Urbino are signed "Diego" in pencil and verso signed and embossed by Dr. Jawdat Naffouj.

In the last 10 years the faces by Diego became less rugged, more refined and elongated. What never changed in Diego's art was his trust in human character. In painting after painting the presence of the human face and figure revealed Diego's vision of the world.

During a second visit to the United States in 1980 accompanied by their daughter Alessandra, Diego and Helga visited with his brother, Vincenzo in Philadelphia. Travels included New York and then headed west stopping in Tacoma, Washington where Diego had an exhibit at Talbert's Kleine Gallery, and Inga Fine Arts in addition to Good Years Gallery in Seattle. Their travels brought them to San Francisco, Albuquerque, Colorado Springs and New Orleans visiting American friends they had met in Germany and held private exhibits along the way.

During their last trip to the US in 1984, travels included a family visit in Philadelphia, a drive back to Albuquerque refreshing Diego's fascination of American Indians, and Colorado Springs to visit with devoted Diego art collectors. Diego did not have exhibits during this trip. A holiday was taken in August 1985 to Menorca, Spain. In fall of 1985 Diego experienced health issues. Then on the trip to Paris with Tony Voci (Diego's Nephew) and Tony's wife Lois, Diego mainly stayed in the hotel room resting.

=== Diego's last hours ===
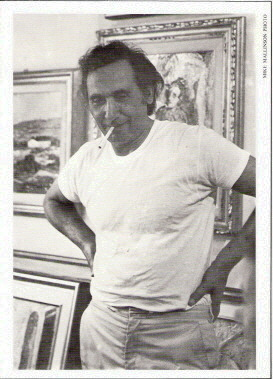
Smoking cut Diego's life short

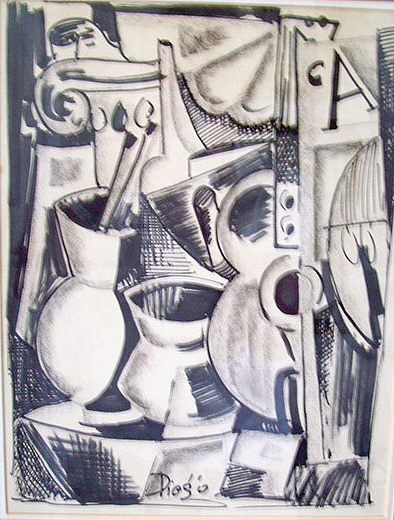
Ink on Paper, 22 ½" x 18 ½", last work of art

That persistent urge to draw that possessed Diego from a young child carried into Diego's last hours. The second weekend of December there was an open house in Diego's home and studio; he was too weak to attend. Yet he found the strength to draw one more piece for a door prize, his last work of art for the public, a cubist, ink drawing; followed by a small pencil sketch for Helga.

Diego, who smoked 40 cigarettes a day, succumbed to lung cancer 10 December 1985.

The resting place for Diego Voci is in Neuhof, Germany. On Helga's periodic visits she shares her thoughts with both Diego and her mother beside him.

== Rediscovering lost art of Antonio Diego Voci ==
The mystery is what happened to all of Diego's early artwork? With his vagabond nature, Diego was notoriously a poor record keeper. Although early examples of Diego Voci artwork are out there somewhere, Diego's first sale at age 18, and all works until 1957 remain totally undiscovered. Search for physical evidence of his art continues. Until 1965, the signatures are all likely a form of "Voci", not "Diego" as mostly on works after 1965. (See comments on the artist's in the "Signatures" section below.)

=== Problem of hoarding ===
Diego's death was followed by a twenty-five-year dirth of information. An Internet search made by a seeker of anything about Diego Voci would come up empty. Diego was largely unknown in the broader art world beyond his dedicated band of devoted collectors who each bought several pieces and "hoarded" his work. Puzzled, an owner of 5 Diego pieces, Mary Trimmins in 2008 posted a simple question on ArtifactCollectors.com, "Are there any Diego painting owners out there?" Little by little Diego owners discovered Trimmins' post.

About 50 collectors responded, reporting over 400 Diego art pieces collectively. These collectors spent 35 to 45 years acquiring their Diego pieces, displaying them to showcase their value. As a result of this concentration of Diego's art in collectors' hands, it rarely appears otherwise on the market. However, as these Diego collectors are often advanced in age, Diego's art has been reappearing in various countries on the market in Germany, Switzerland, USA and Canada. The Diego Voci Project has archived over 1,000 artworks accompanied by the narraties from several Diego collectors and their families relating their encounters with Diego.

=== Search on Internet sites established ===
In 2009, inspired by the positive response of Diego collectors' to Trimmins question, Diego's grand nephew Christopher Voci in Philadelphia created www.diegovociproject.com with a mission to "Rediscover Lost Art of Antonio Diego Voci". A Diego collector in California also volunteered to assist in the search for lost Diego artwork establishing sites on Facebook (Diego Voci), Twitter (@DiegoVoci). Also on Artifact Collectors, (to supplement the Trimmin's thread) "Diego Voci History" and "Diego Voci Painting of the Week".

After a quarter century vacuum of information the collaborative internet search for the thousands of undiscovered works by Diego Voci is gradually yielding collectors in various countries. Fifteen of the more avid collectors identified each had a dozen or more works by Diego. One self-confessed Diego "hoarder" referred to his "addiction" for collecting Diego's artwork as the "Potato Chip Phenomenon", you can't stop at only one. Siegfred Dahms, Wiesbaden art dealer expressed a similar experience.

=== Switzerland: two works discovered ===
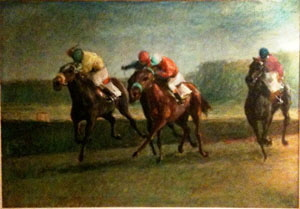
"Horses Racing" 1962/63, oil on canvas, 28" x 40", Private Collection SL

The earliest physical evidence found to date of a purchase of Diego art work is two larger beautifully rendered paintings sold by the Schlossgalarie, in Zurich, Switzerland. Owner R. Buri considered these two paintings to be "Antonio Voci" masterworks. His wealthy clients often sought exceptional horse paintings. The 1962/3 "Horses Racing", was described by Mr. Buri as a "Voci masterpiece with hints of a fine Edgar Degas."

Just as Diego travelled the world, so too did his art. "Horses Racing" went to auction in Paris where it was purchased by an antique dealer from Basel. It was then purchased by a Czech born grand-dame as a wedding gift to her new son-in-law, who came from a family of race horse breeders in India. When contacted about his Diego in London where he resides, the son-in-law declared, "You call it a Diego, I consider it a Voci". And it is signed "A. Voci". Schlossgalerie advertised the artist under the name "Antonio Voci" (No "Diego").

Also signed "A. Voci" is another significant Diego piece "Alt und Jung" pictured in the Schlossgalerie advertisement of the Neue Zürcher Zeitung 20 January 1965. This painting also travelled, purchased in Zurich and ending in US, 43 years later.

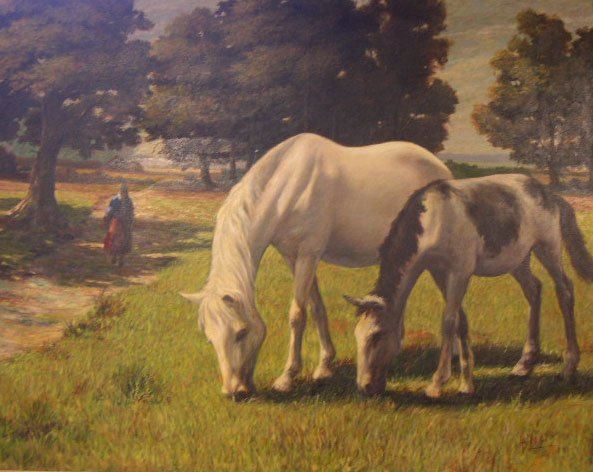
"Alt und Jung" 1965, 47" x 59", oil on canvas, Private Collection - Owner Unknown

A colour image of Diego's "Alt und Jung" painting can also be seen in a 2008 rare internet recorded sale on LiveAuctioneers.com. Kodner Auctions mis-titled the painting "Horses Grazing". In the absence of information about the artist, the painting was sold for a fraction of its original selling price. Later, a Diego collector offered to triple the price (or more), but requests to Kodner to reveal the present whereabouts were rejected.

== Innocenzo v. Diego ==
"Diego" as he wanted the world to know him, rejected his birth middle name "Innocenzo". Being the youngest of three boys by fifteen years, that sweet little newborn was the picture of innocence (Italian: innocenza). Diego wanted to be seen as anything but innocent. The family pet childhood name "Toto" was enough to bear. "Diego told me he never liked his middle name," said Helga Drössler Voci, wife. "Innocenzo" is conspicuous by its official document absence in Diego's life. Innocenzo was discovered only on his birth certificate. After that it is "Antonio Voci" until 1976 when "Diego" is slipped into a government document.

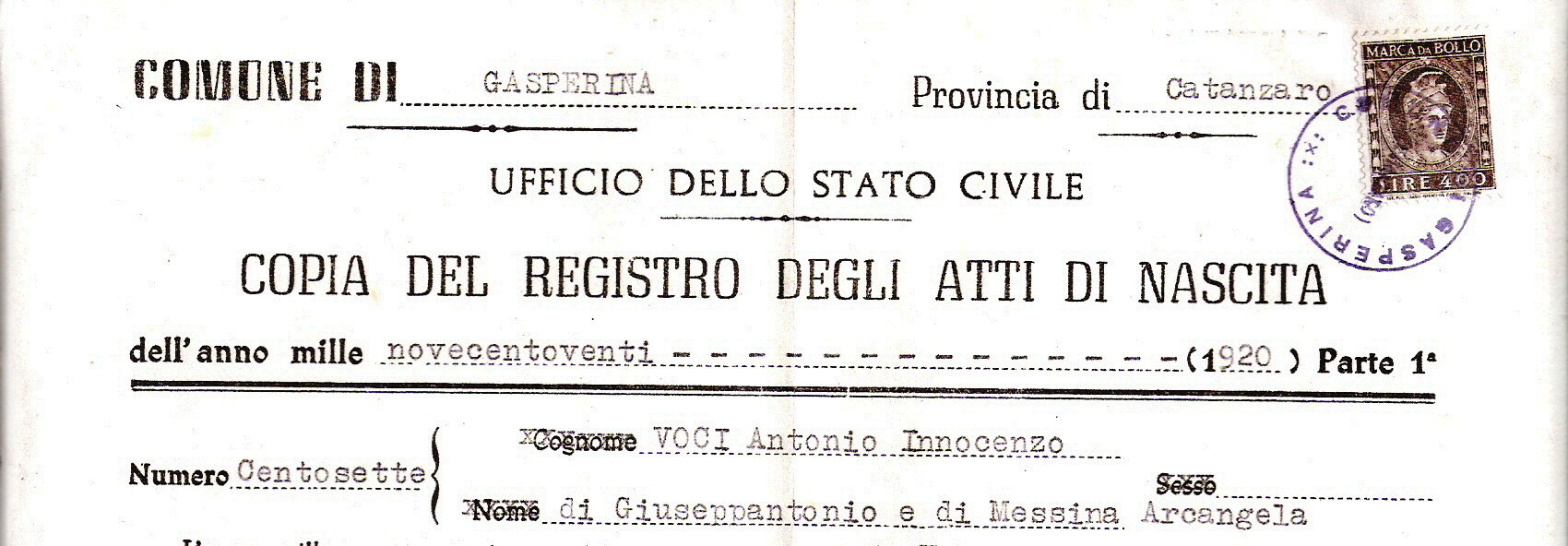
The 10 August 1920 Gasperina Birth Certificate middle name "Innocenzo": (No Diego)

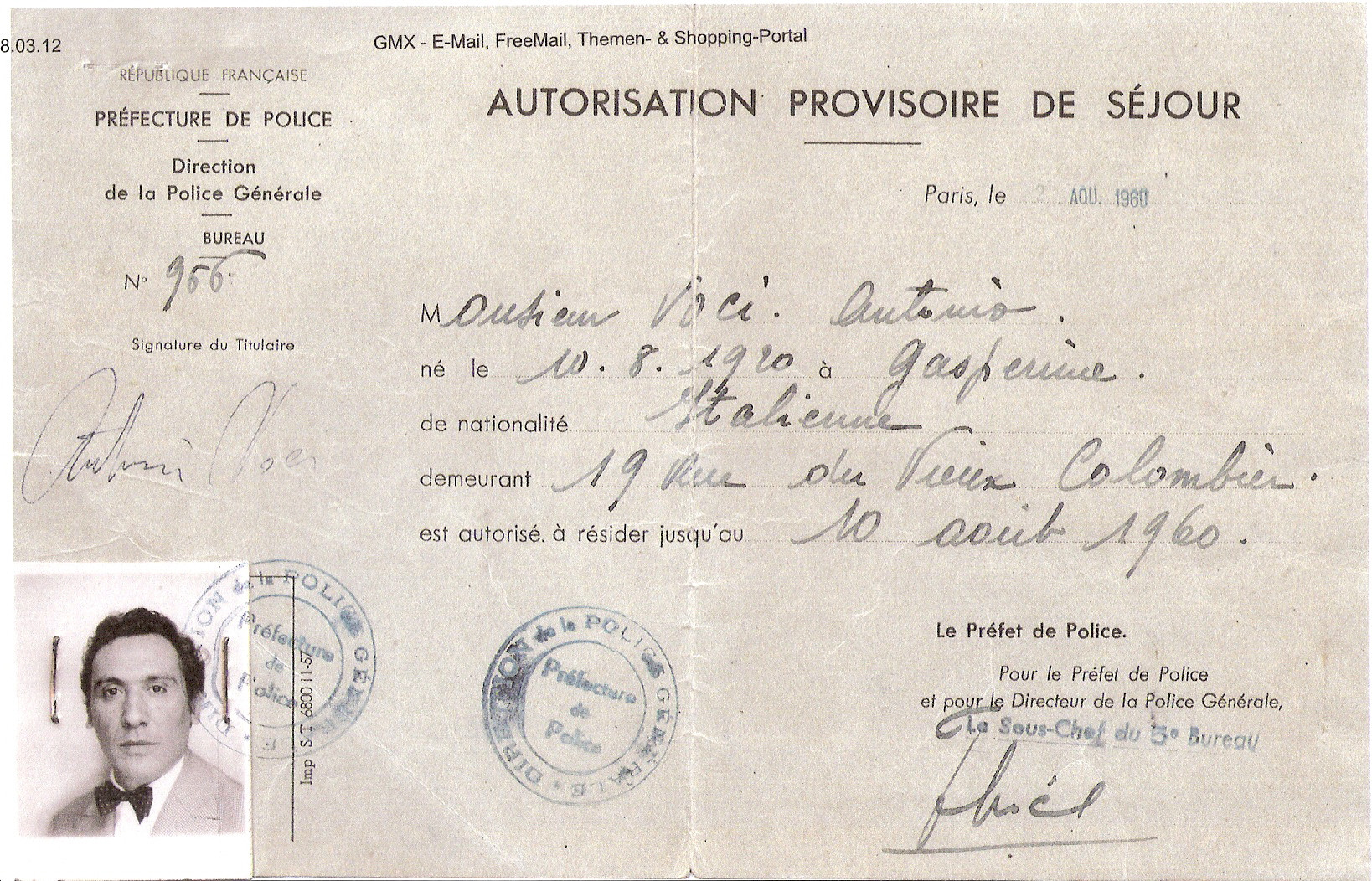
August 1960 Paris proof of residence, no "Innocenzo"

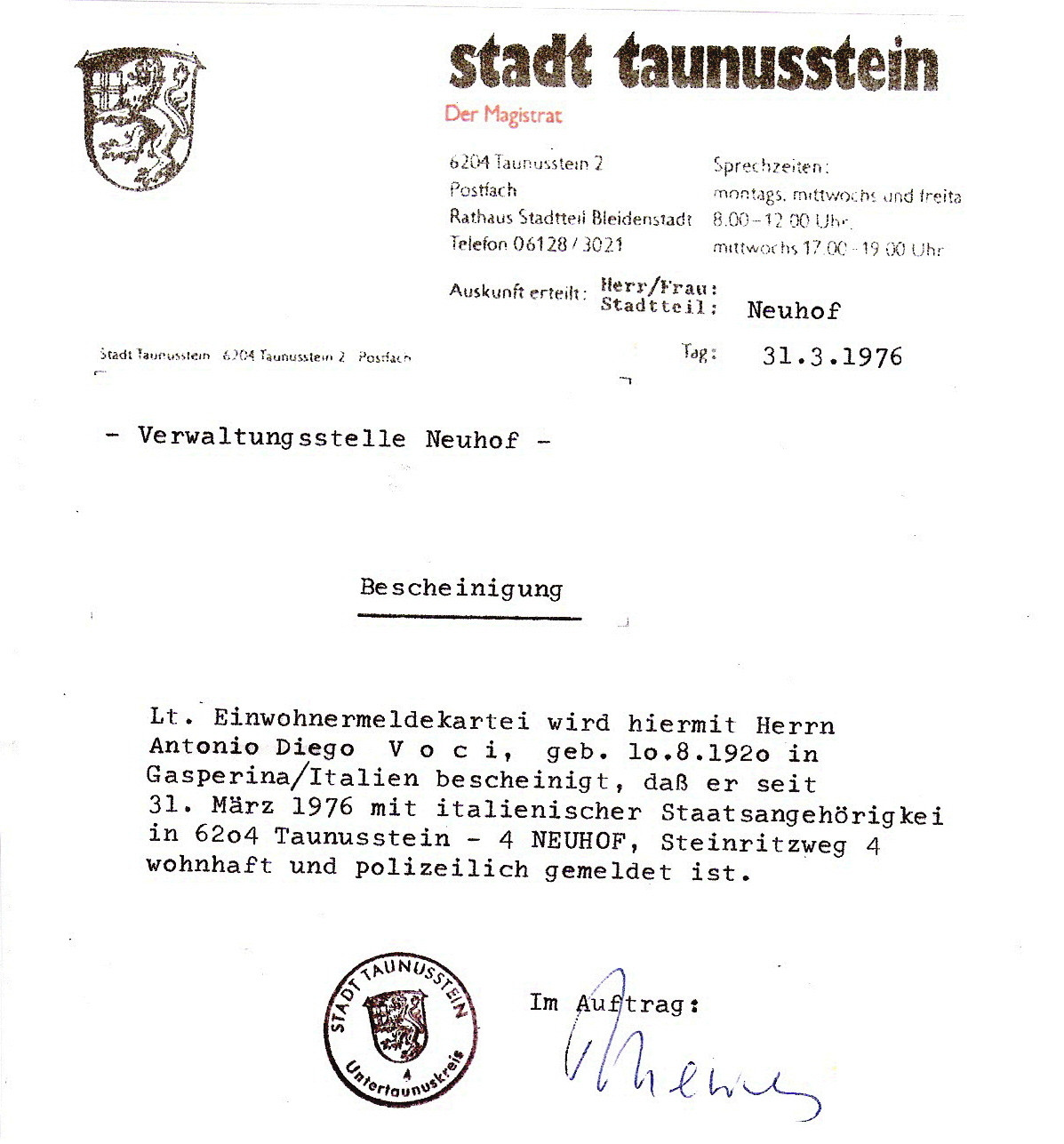
In 1976, the metamorphous of Diego for his middle name was completed by Diego on at least one official document when he registered residence in Taunusstein (by Wiesbaden) at the time he and Helga purchased their first and last home and studio. The name is "Antonio Diego Voci", finally official recognition of Diego on a government document

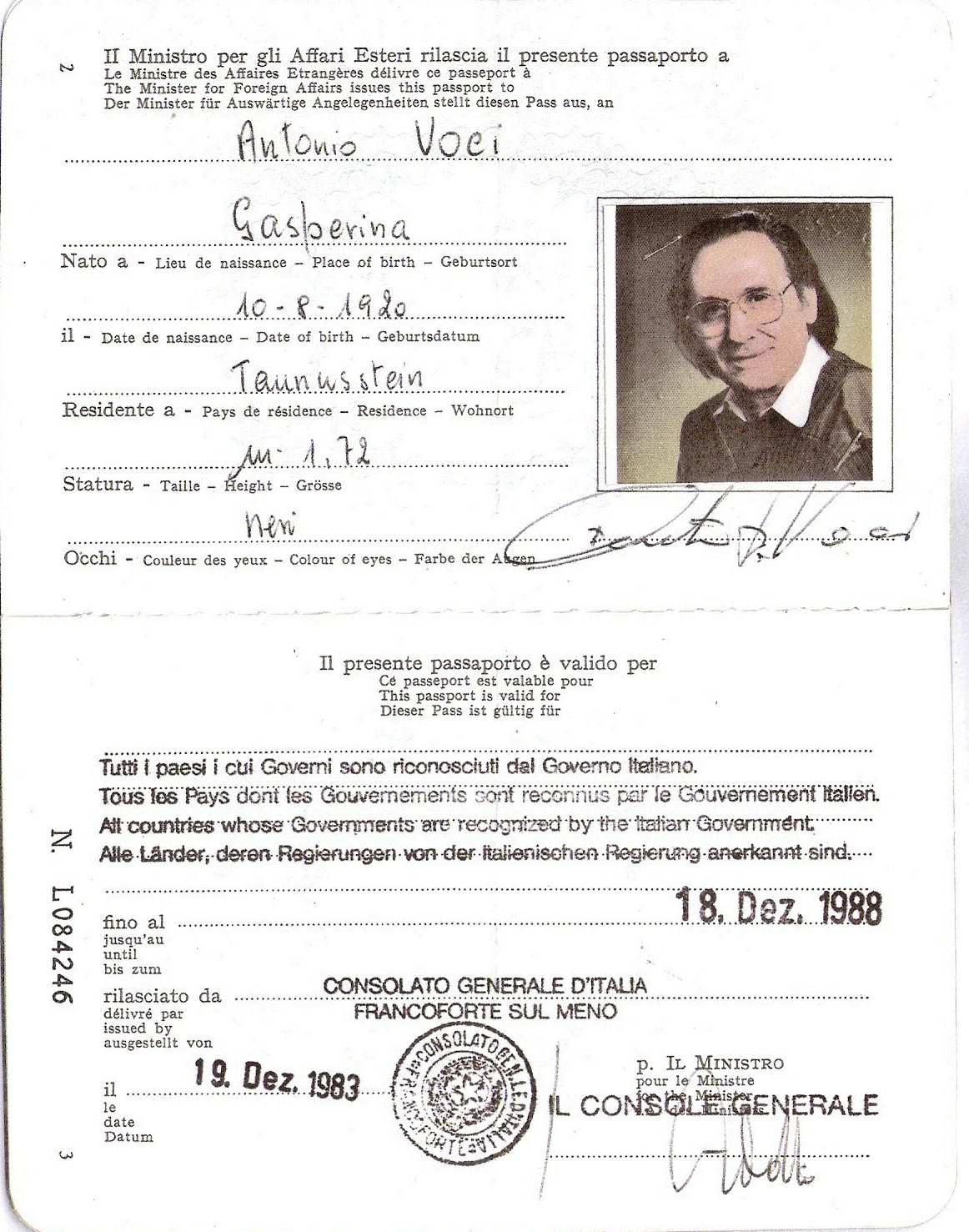
Various passports were always "Antonio Voci" with matching signature, . However he did slip a "D" into his written signature in the 1983 passport.

== Gallery ==
Works

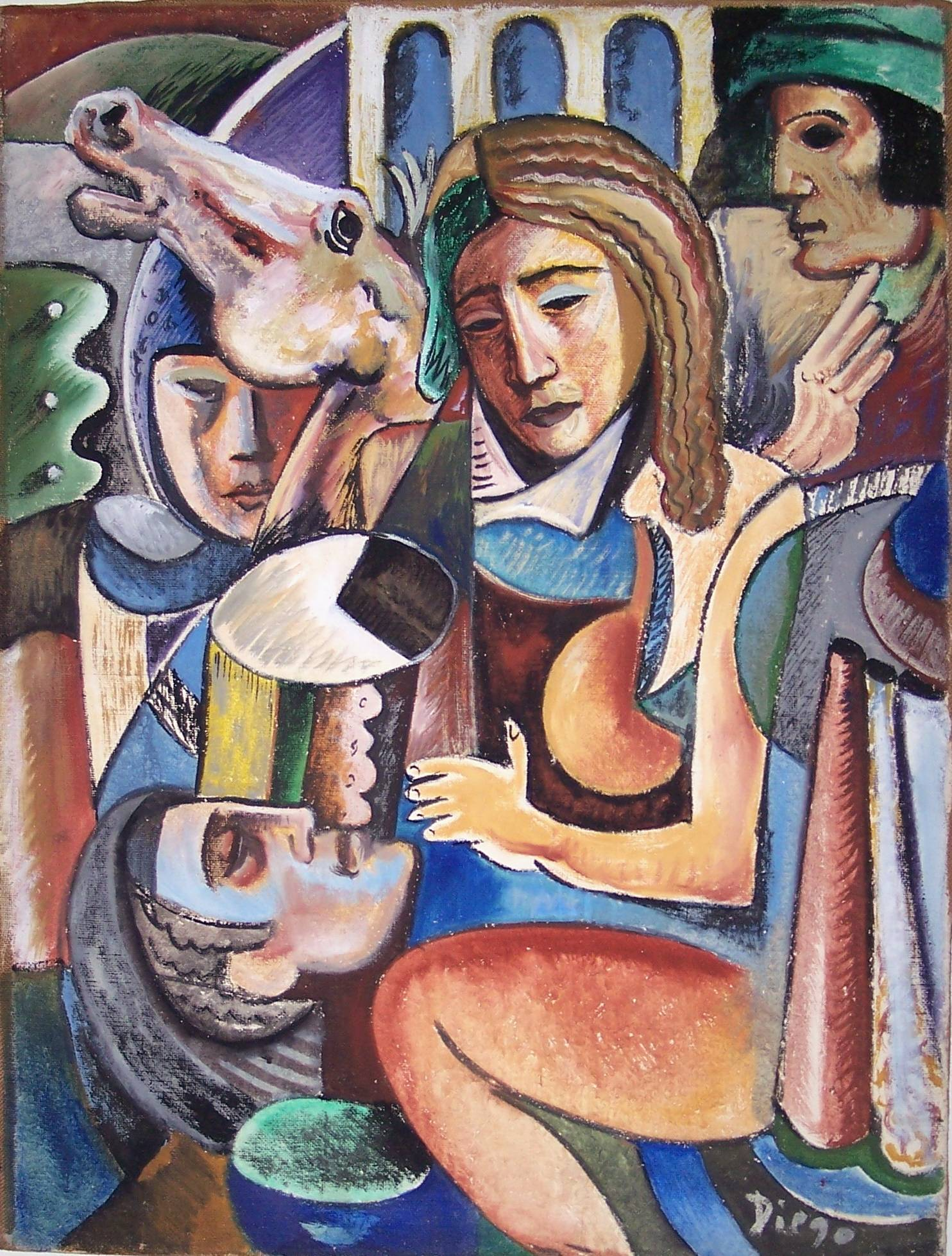
Death in Battle (ca. 1965), 47.5 x 36.2 in, Private Collection - Notable

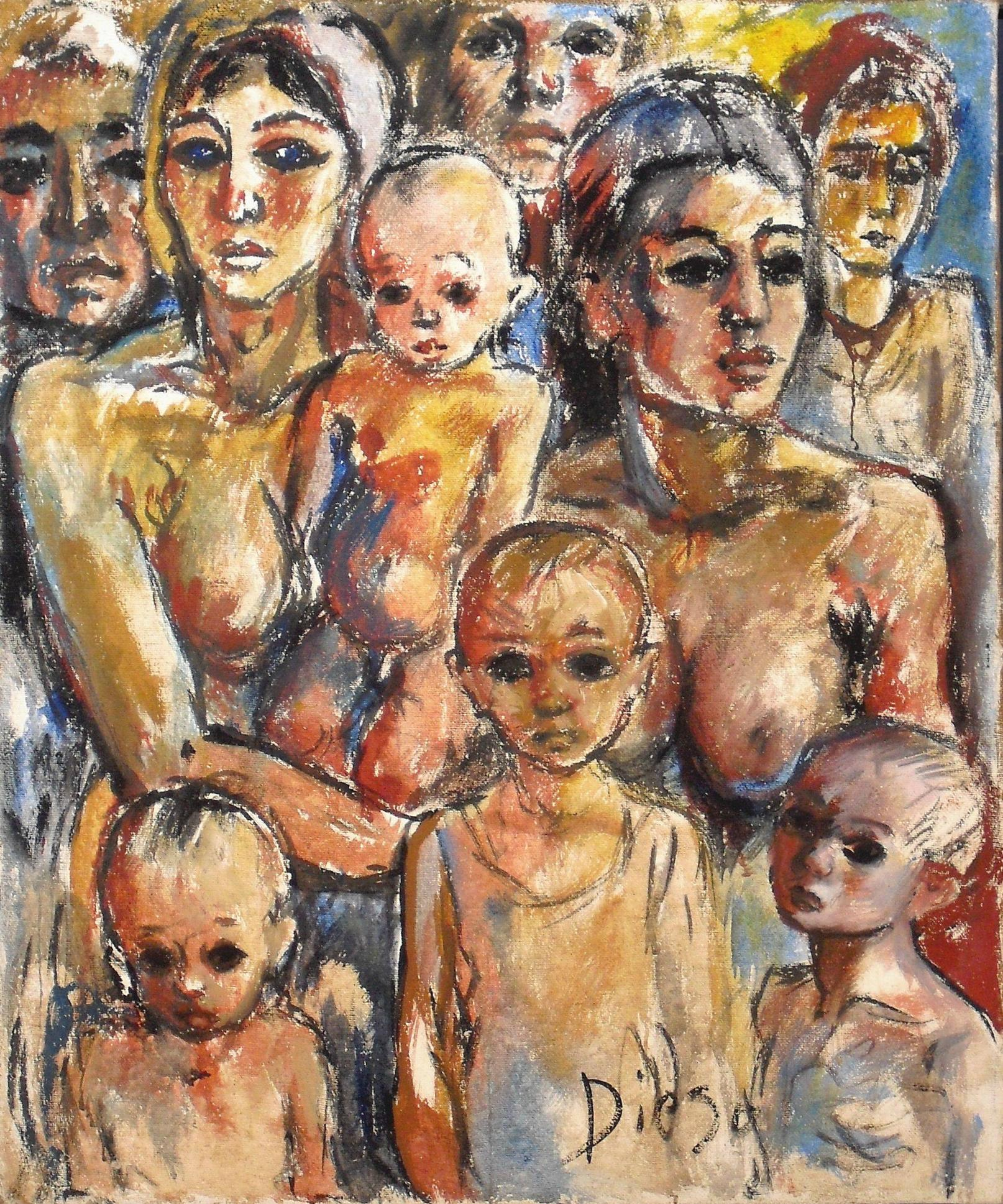
Poor People (ca.1968), 39.5 x 47.5 in, Private Collection - Notable

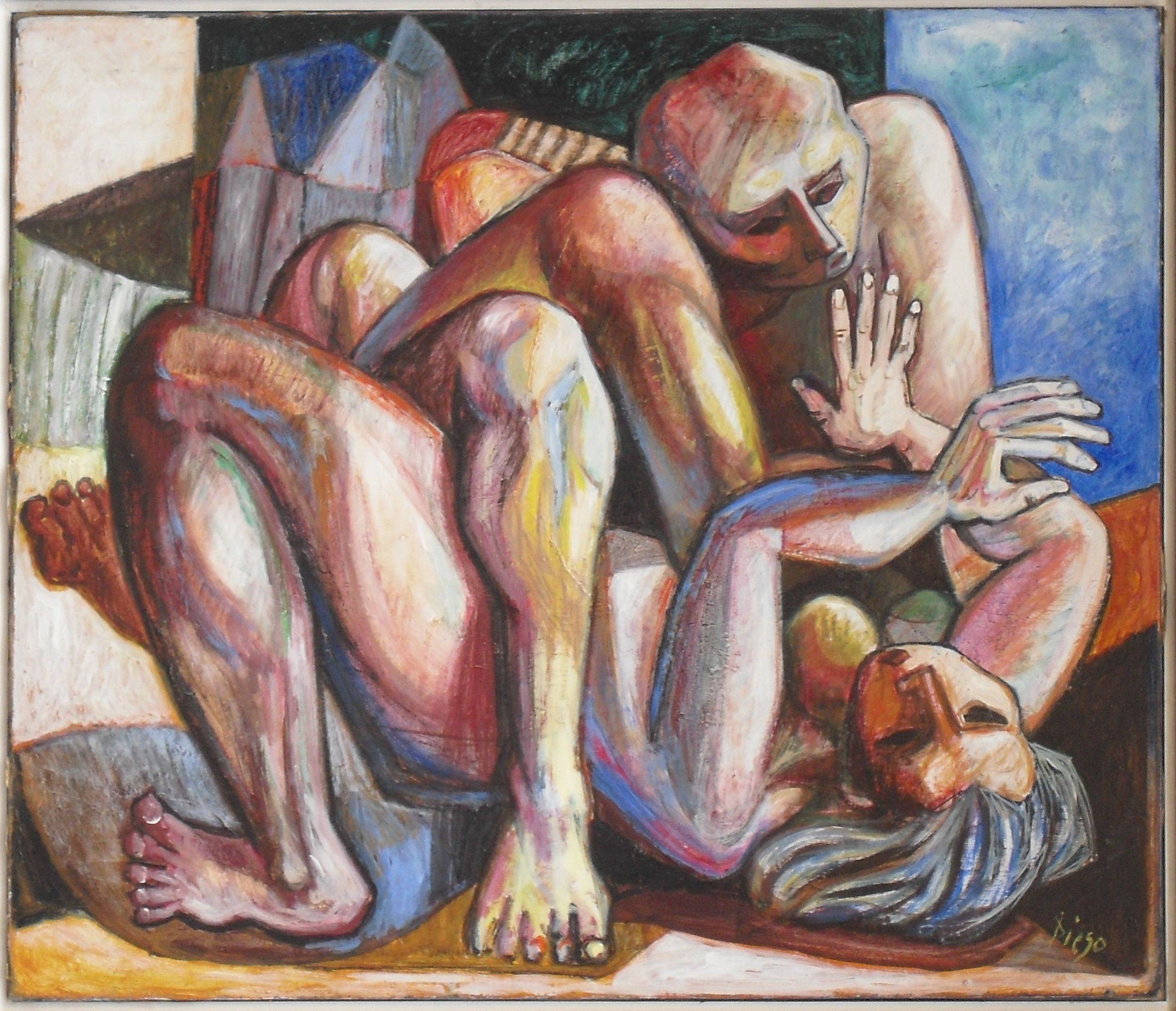
La Violenza (1973), 35.3 x 41.5 in, Private Collection - Notable

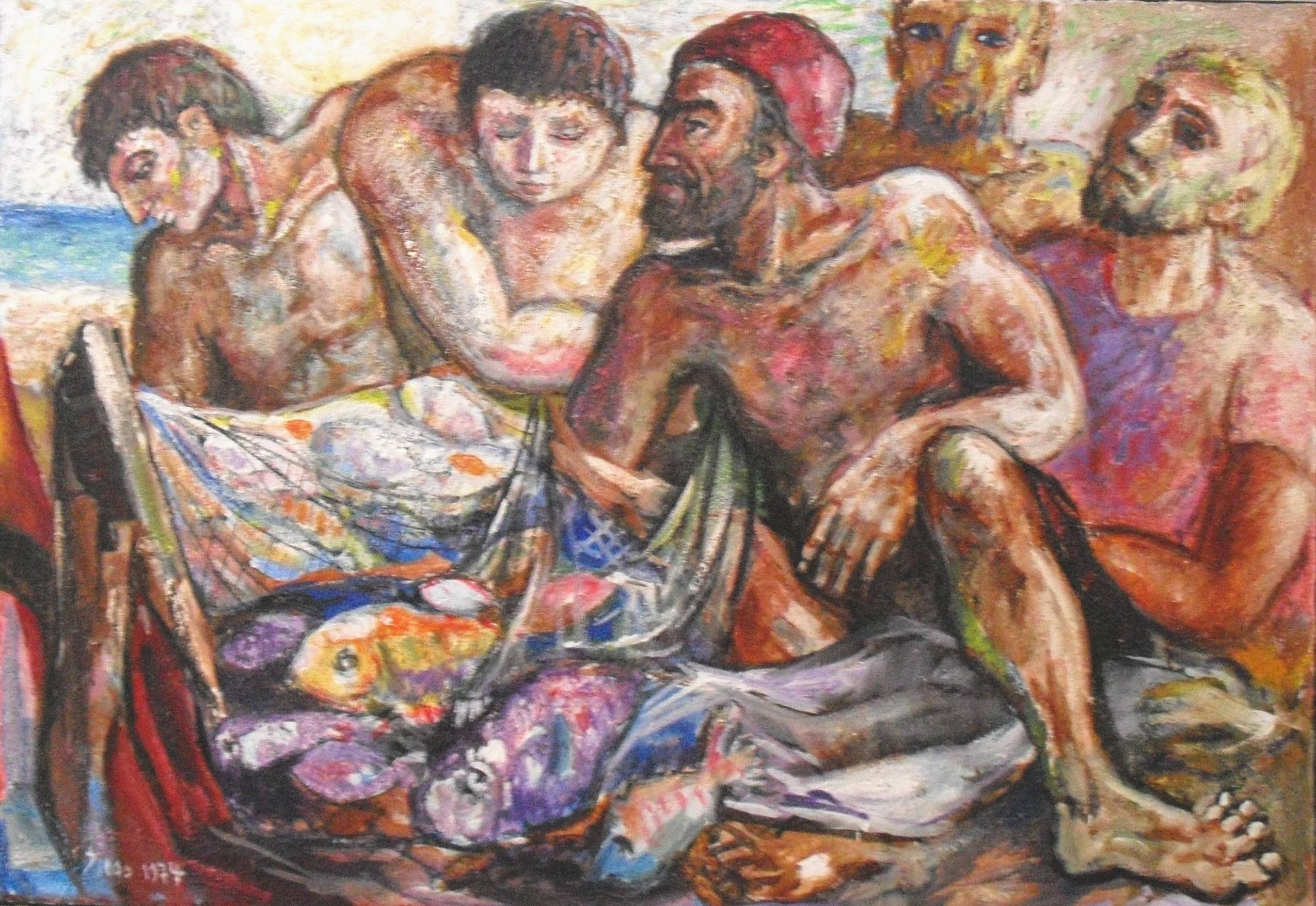
The Fishermans Miraculous Catch (1974), 35.5 x 51 in, Private Collection - Notable

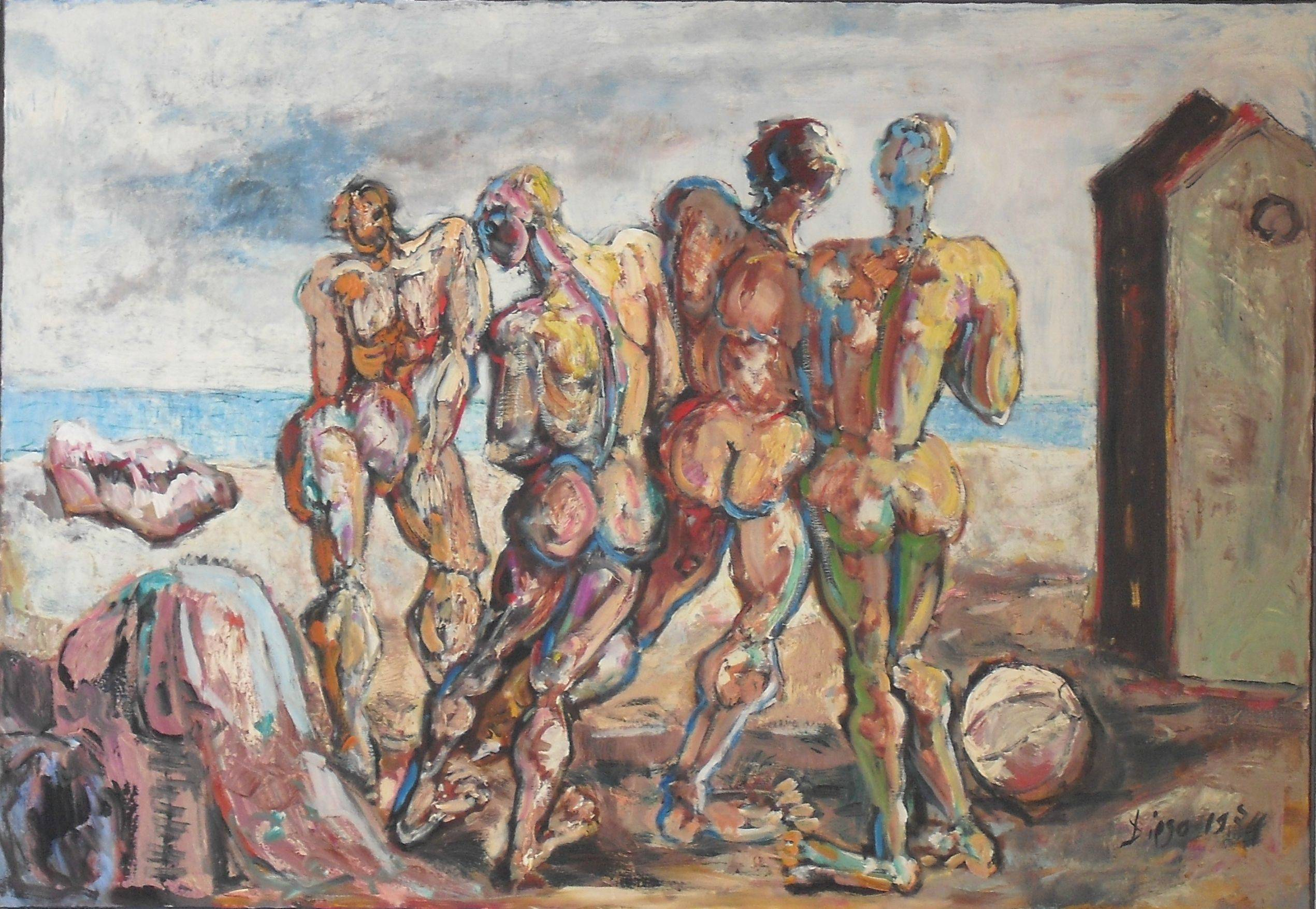
Hommes sur La Plage (The Bathers) (1974), 35.5 x 51in, Private Collection - Notable

Faces

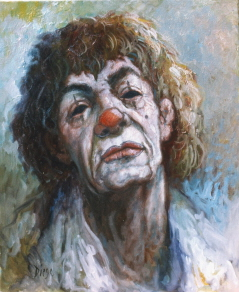
The Clown (ca.1973), est. 24 x 20 in, Stolen in Germany

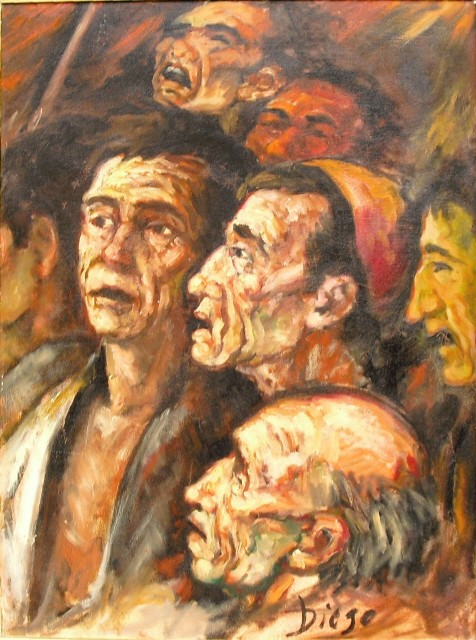
Anguish (1967), 31 x 23in, Private Collection

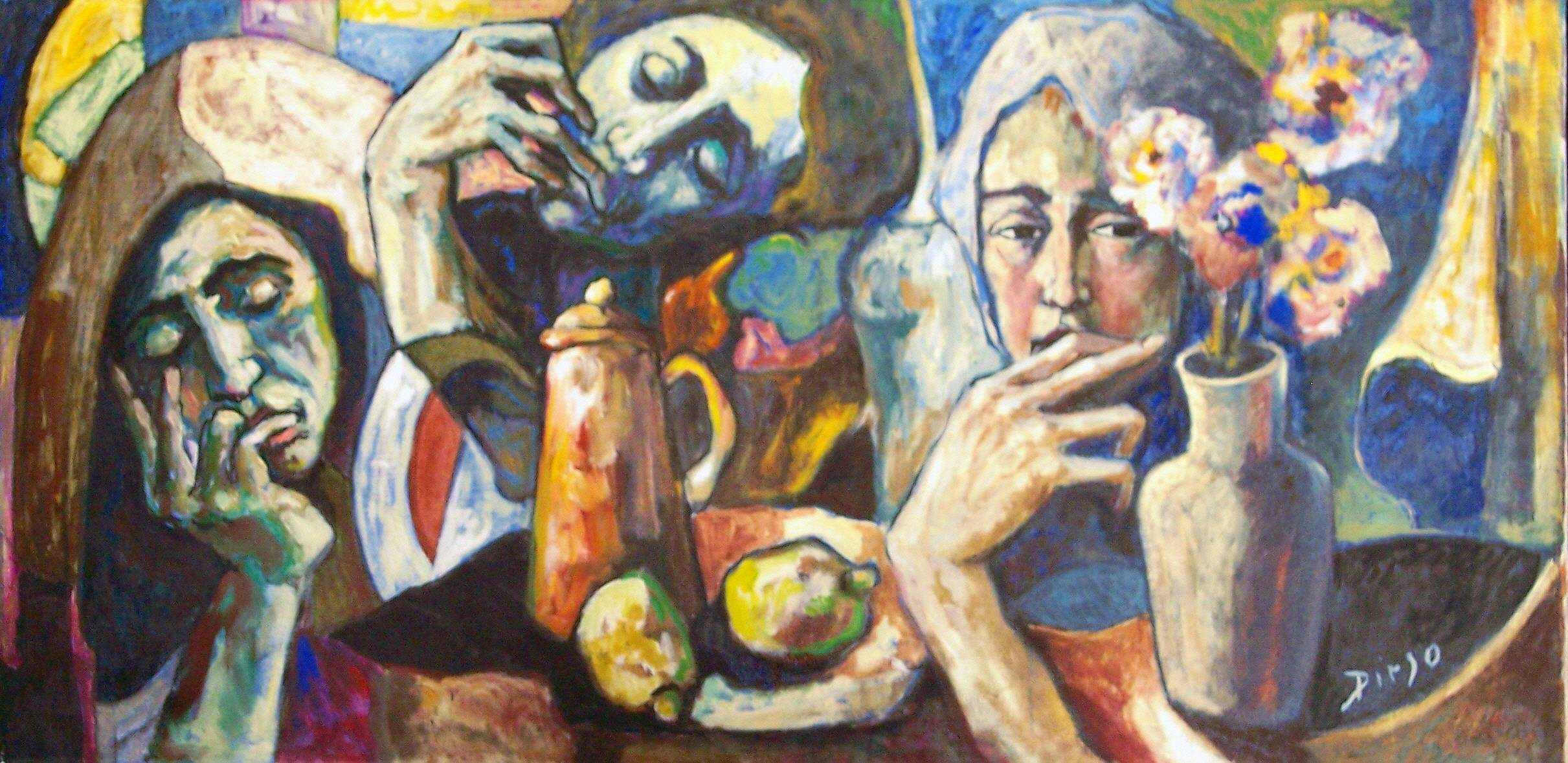
The Friends (ca. 1966), 23.6 x 47.2in, Private Collection - Notable

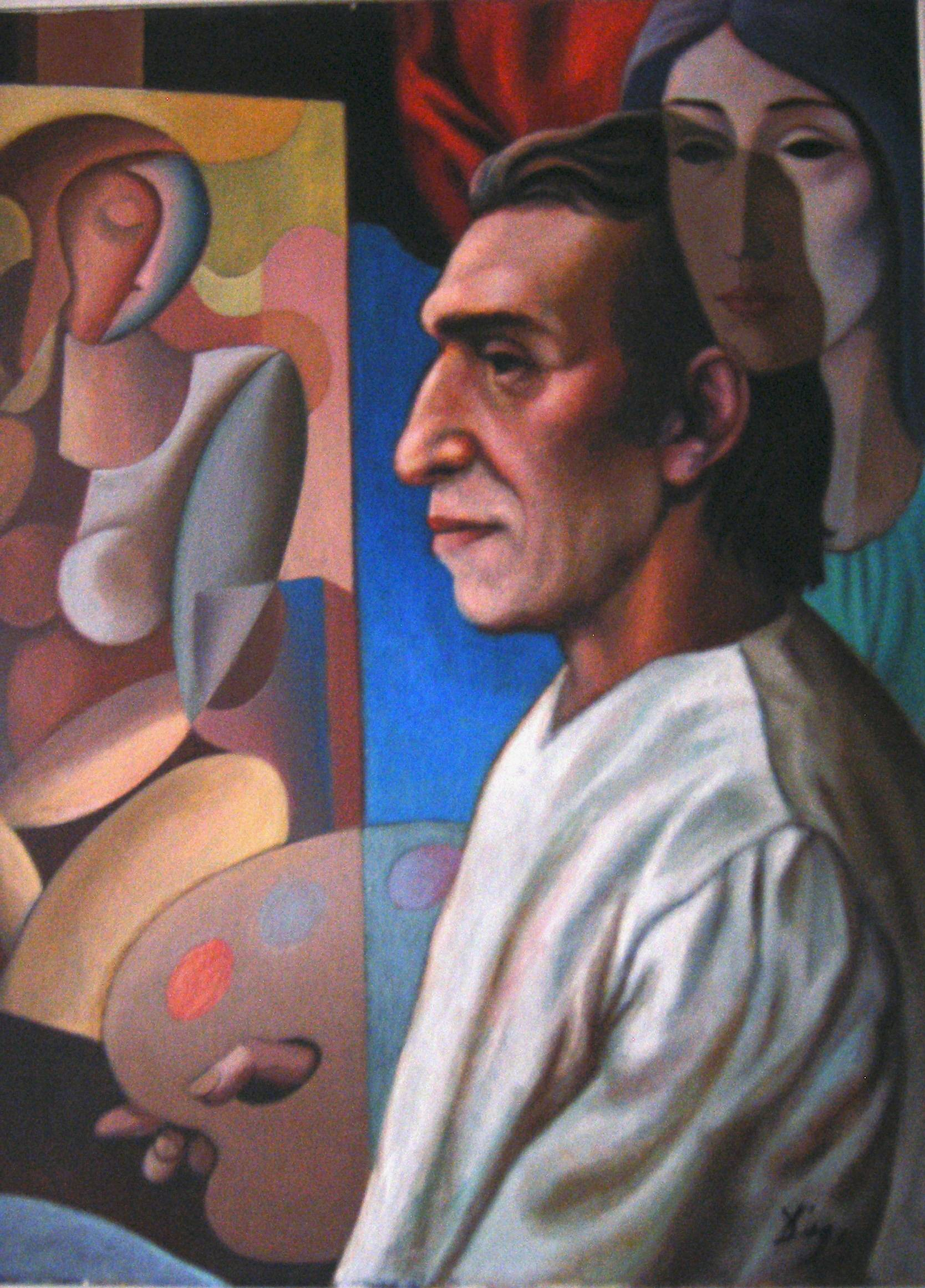
Der Kunstler und Sein Model (Self-Portrait), 32 x 24in, Private Collection JT

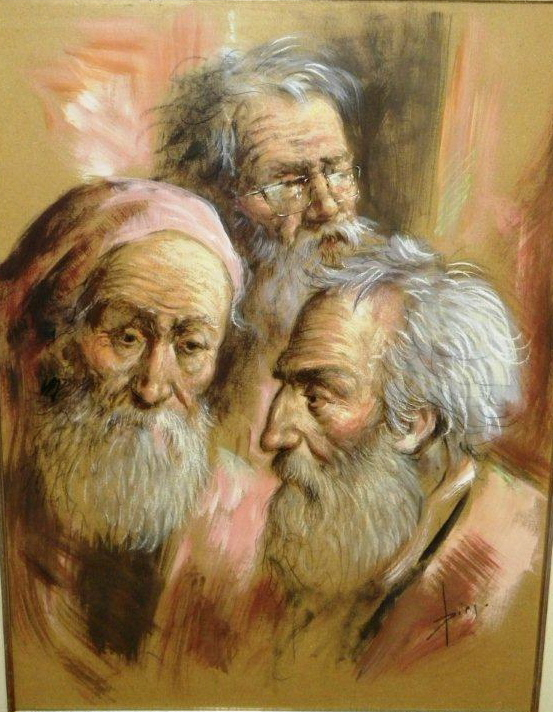
Three Philosophers (ca.1982), 30 x 23in, Private Collection

Surrealism

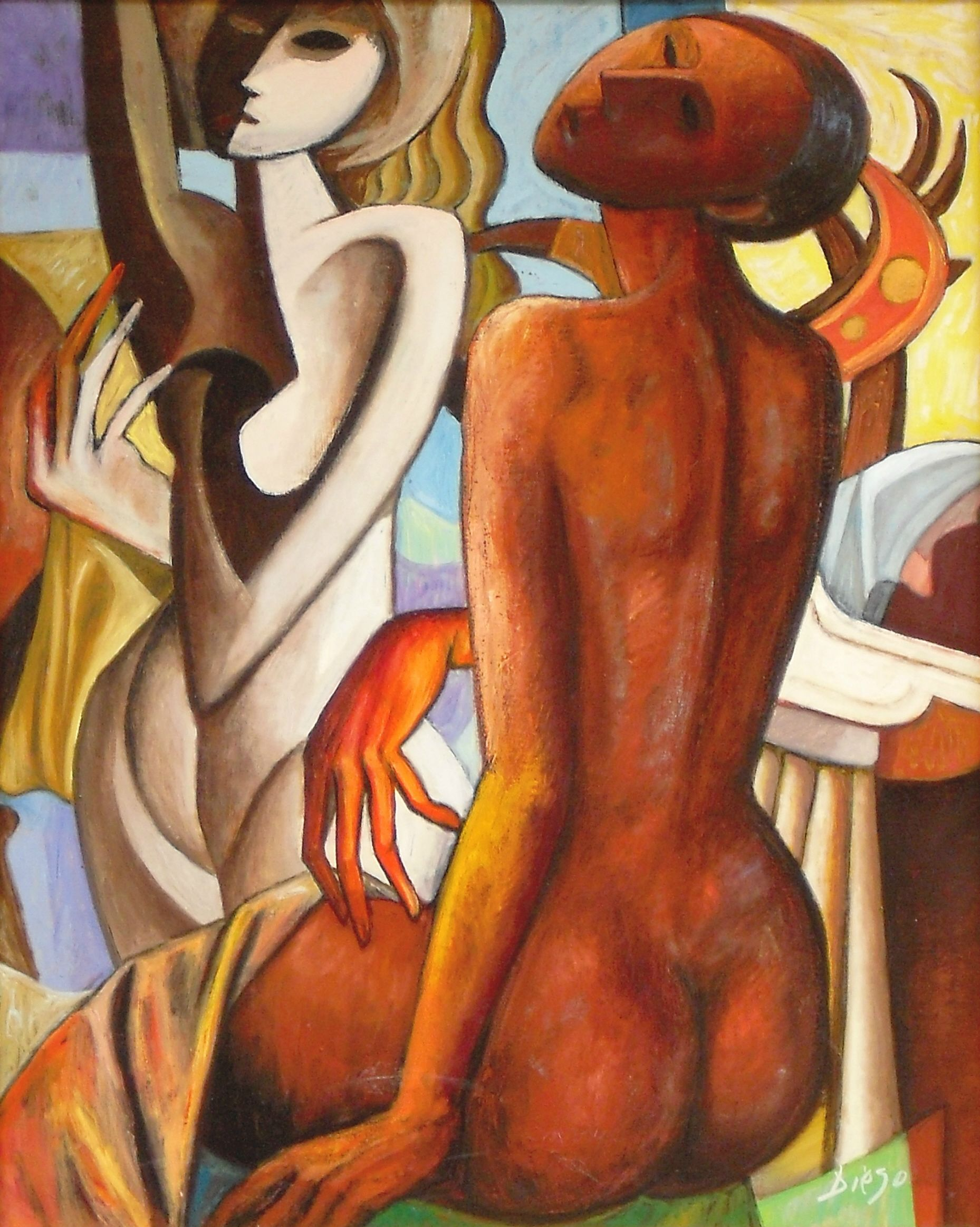
The Red Hand (1974), 31.5 x 39.5in, Private Collection-Notable

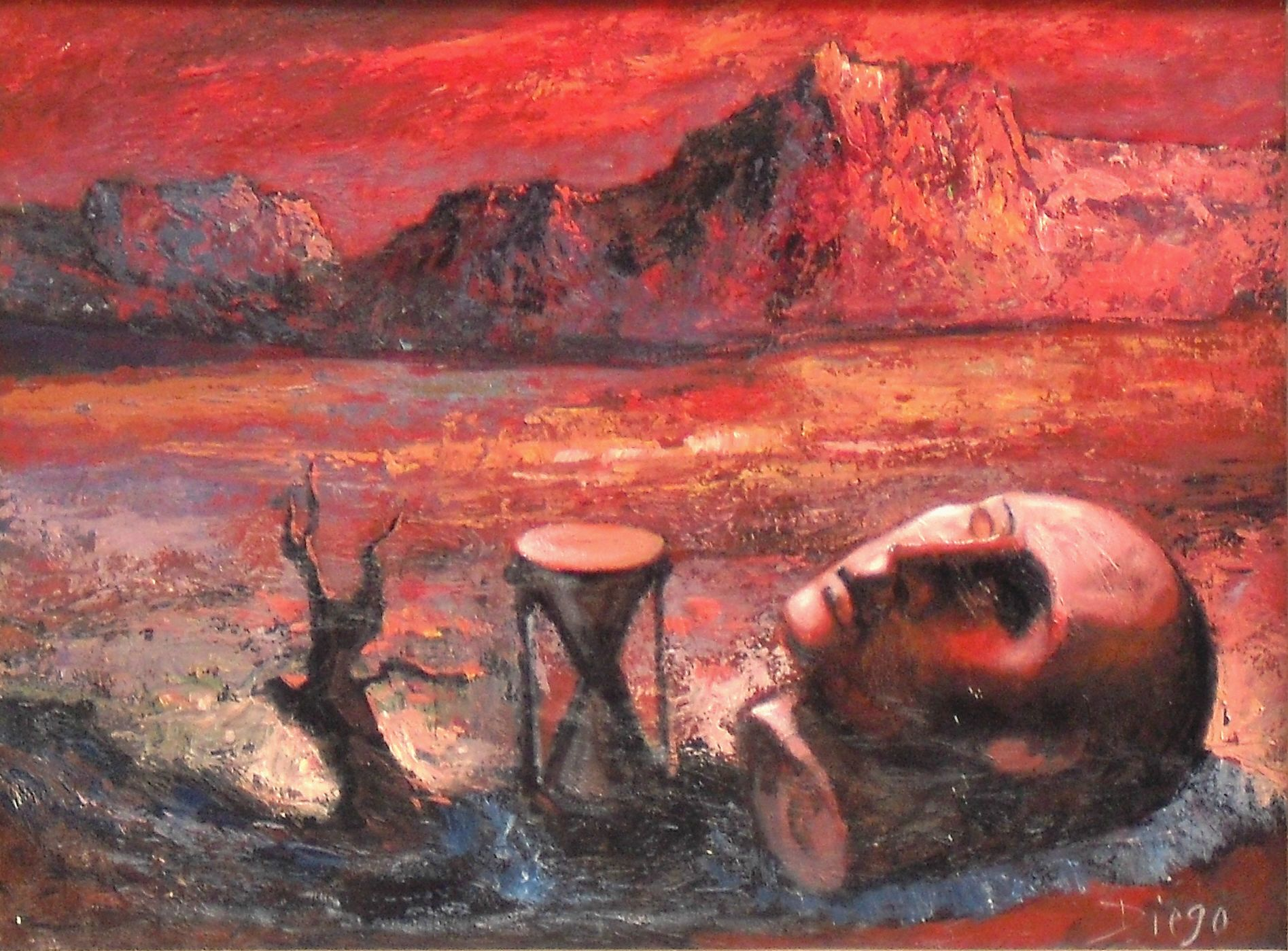
Remains of Civilization (ca.1967), 23.7 x 31.7in, Private Collection - Notable

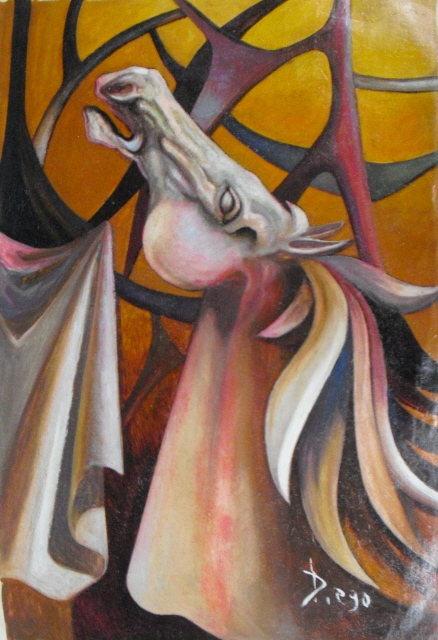
Valiant Stallion (1967), 23.5 x 35in, Private Collection - Notable

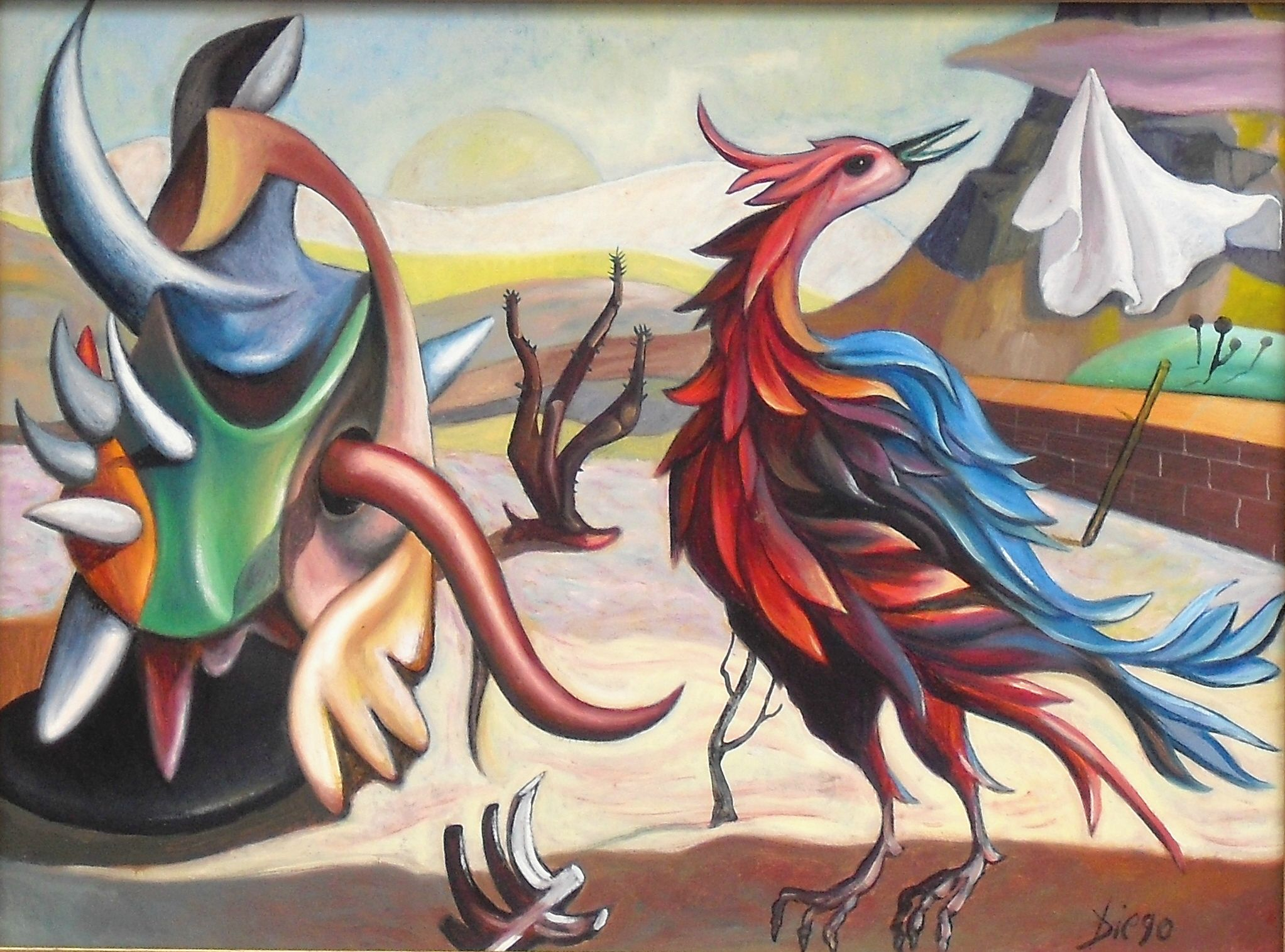
Les Animaux (ca.1971), 24.2 x 31.5in, Private Collection - Notable

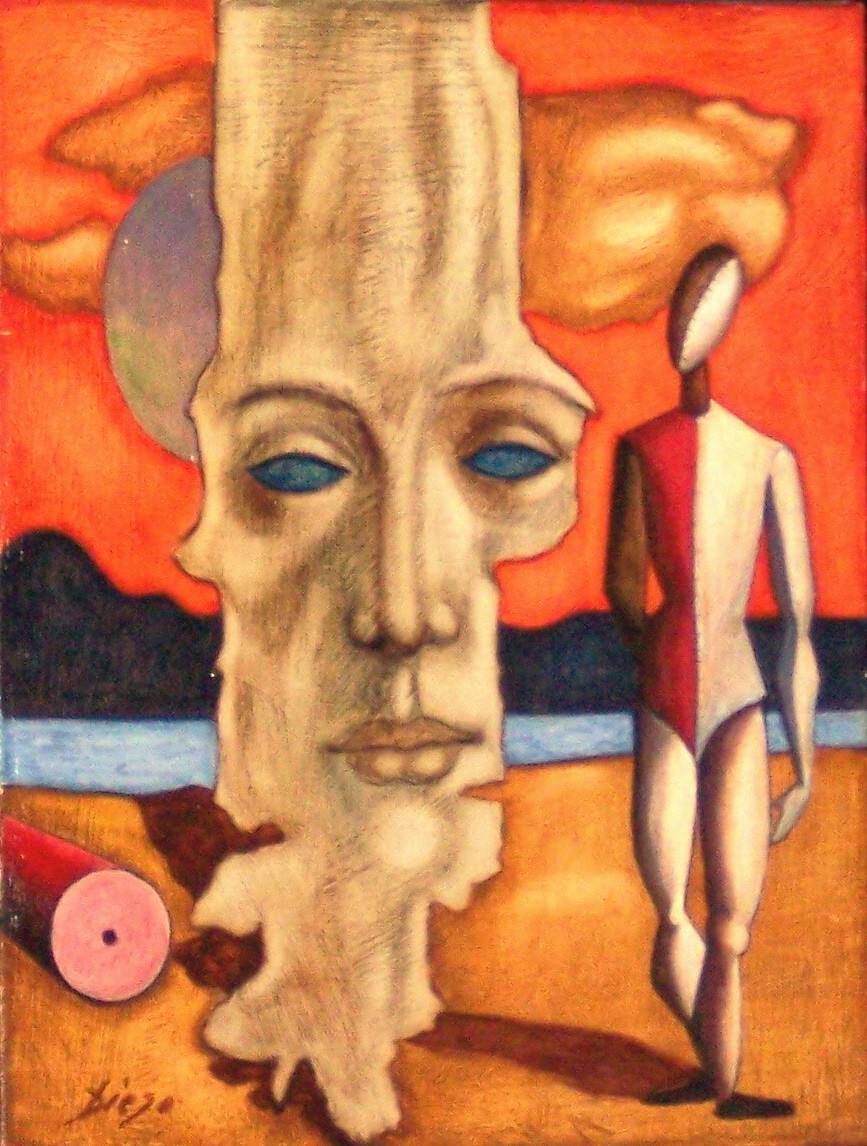
Promenade (ca.1975), 19.75 x 15.75in, Private Collection - Notable

Cubism

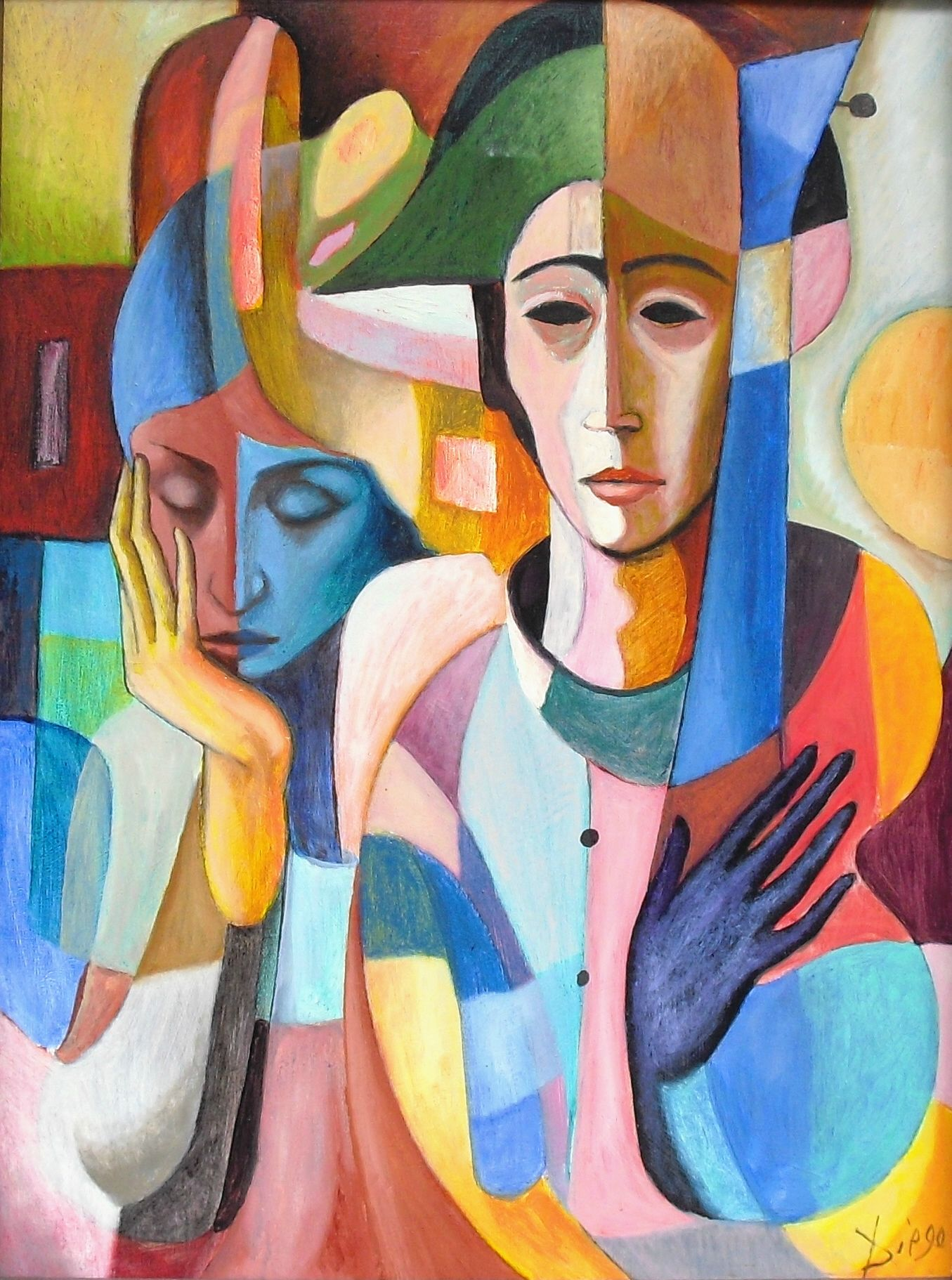
Le Concert de Harliquin (1972), 23.75 x 32in, Private Collection - Notable

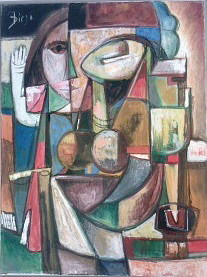
Cubism (ca.1978), 32 x 24in, Private Collection MH

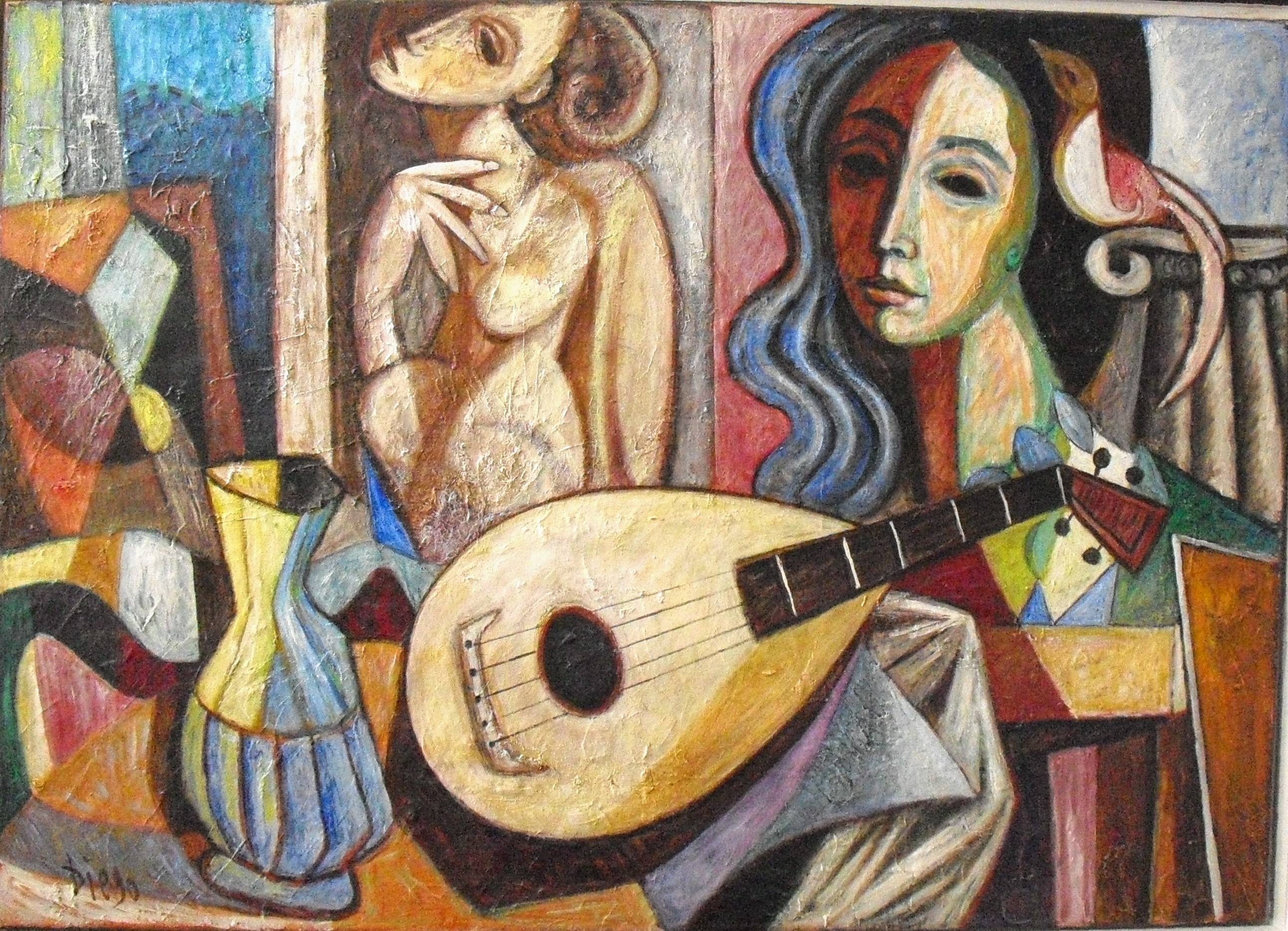
The Mandoline (1974), 29.5 x 41.5in, Private Collection - Notable

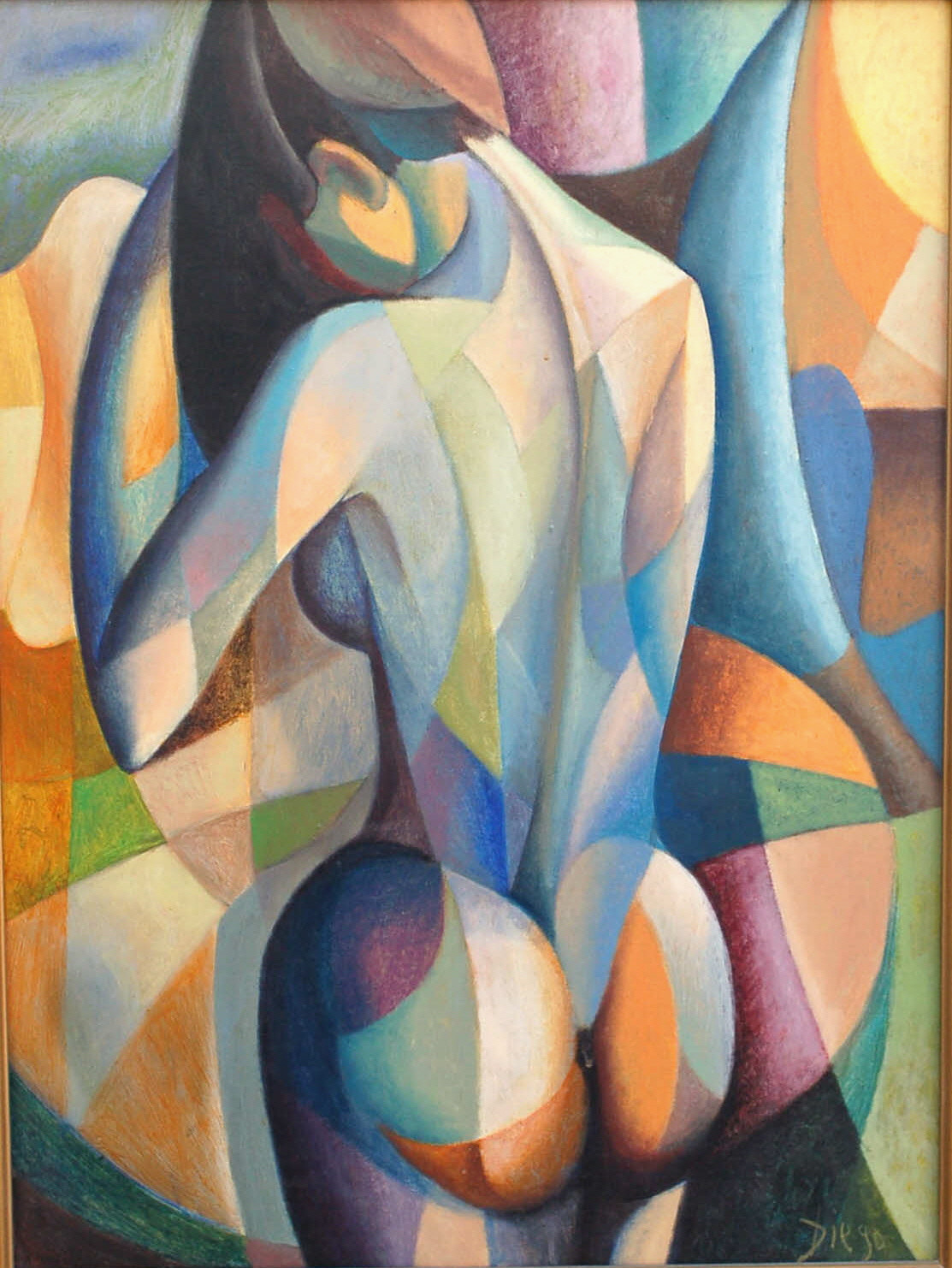
Composition Nude (ca.1971), 31 x 16in, Private Collection - BS

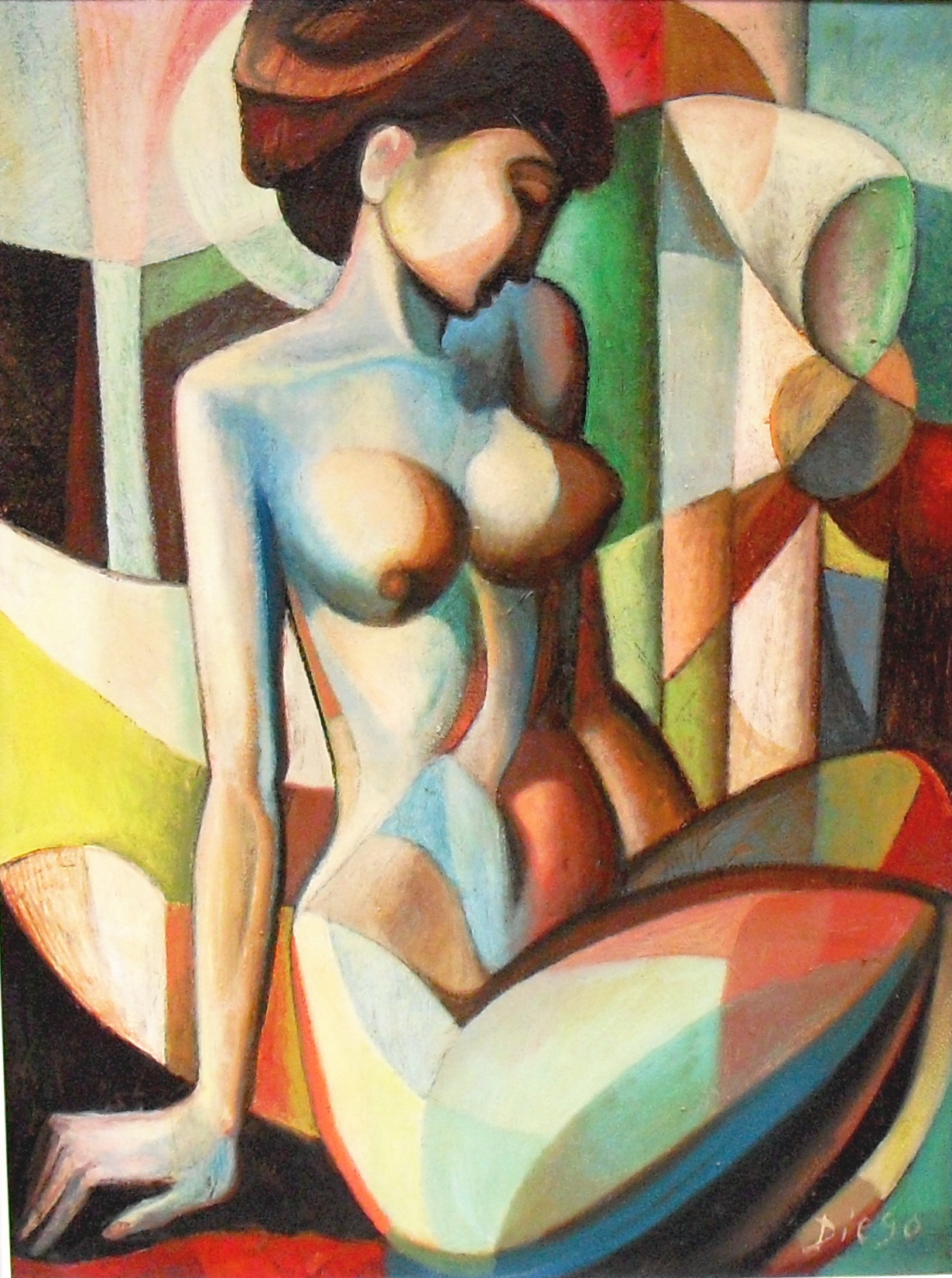
Nude (1971), 23.5 x 31.75in, Private Collection

Clowns, Harlequins, and Musicians

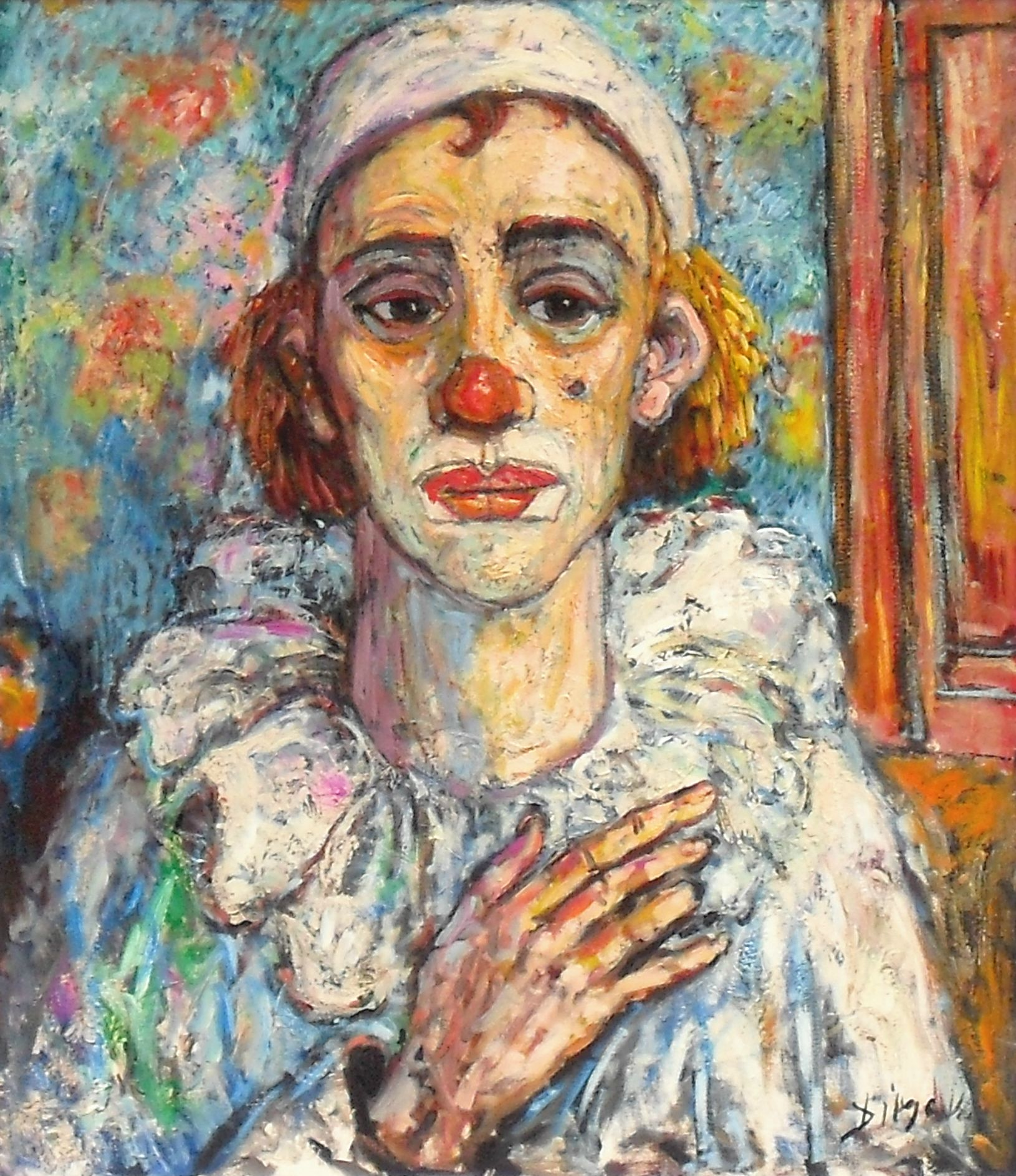
Ernesto the Clown (ca.1975), 27.5 x 31.5in, Private Collection - Notable

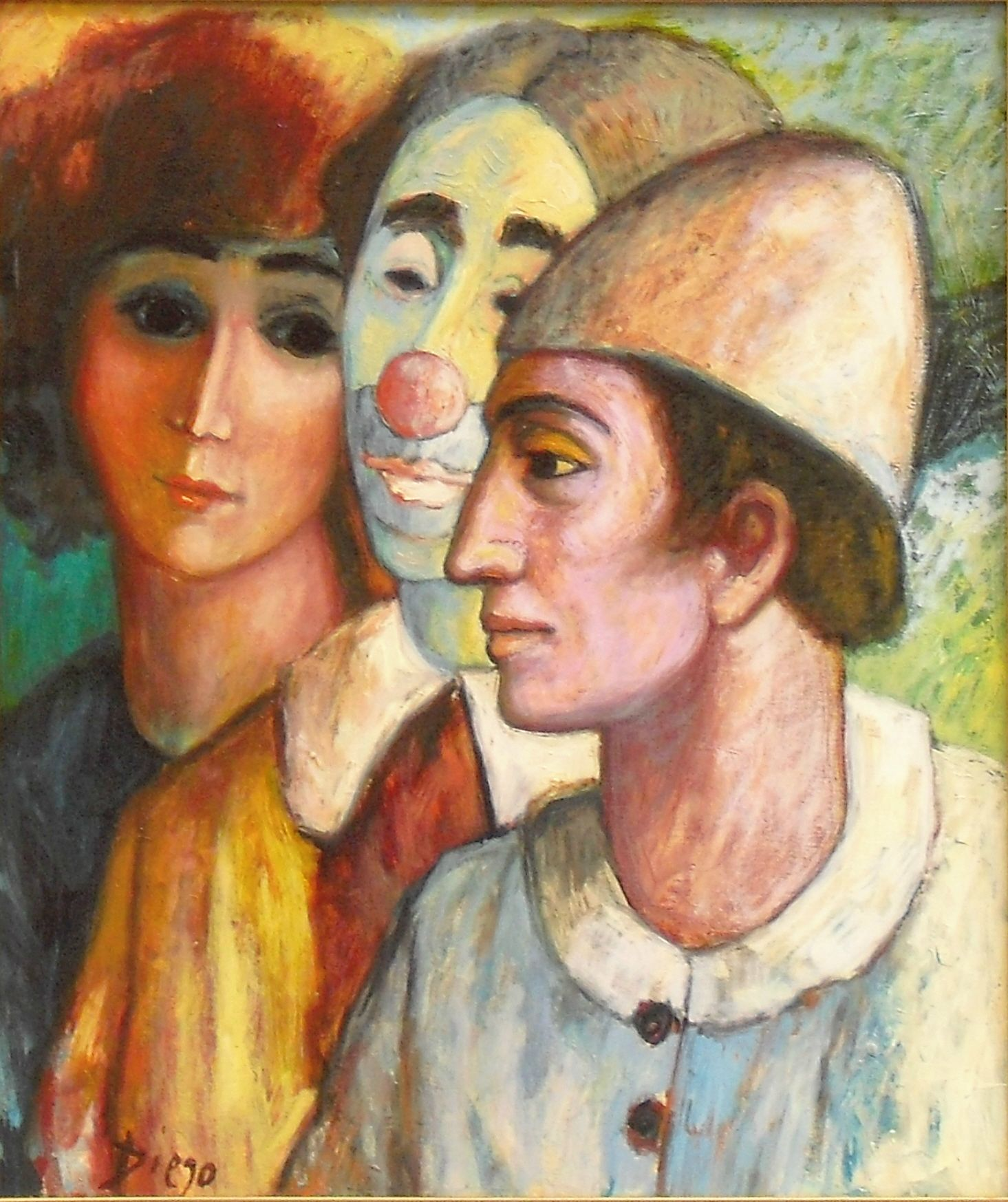
Circus People (ca.1976), 23.3 x 28.2in, Private Collection - Notable

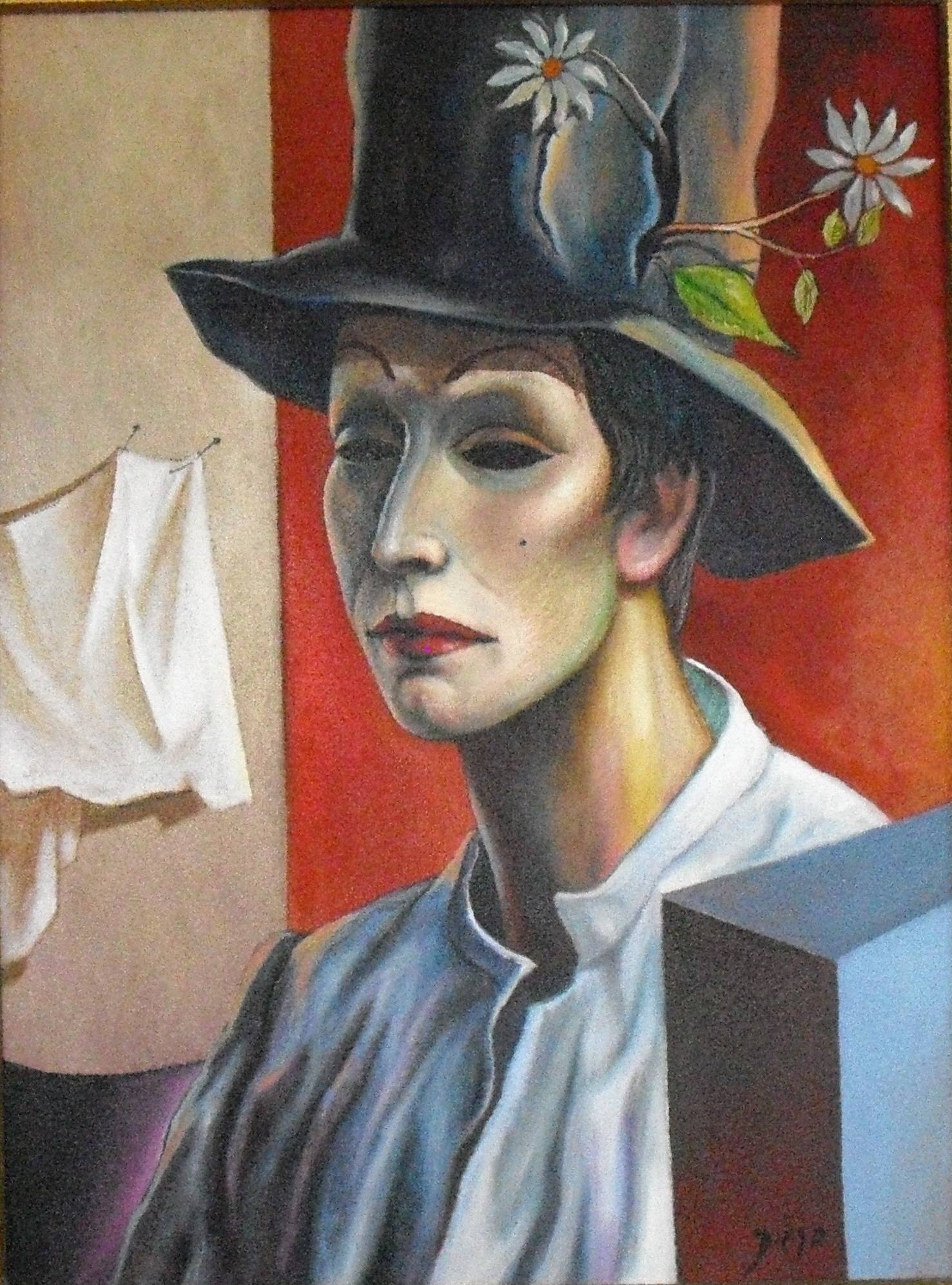
Der Narr mit Margerite Clown (ca.1972), 31.5 x 23.5in, Private Collection

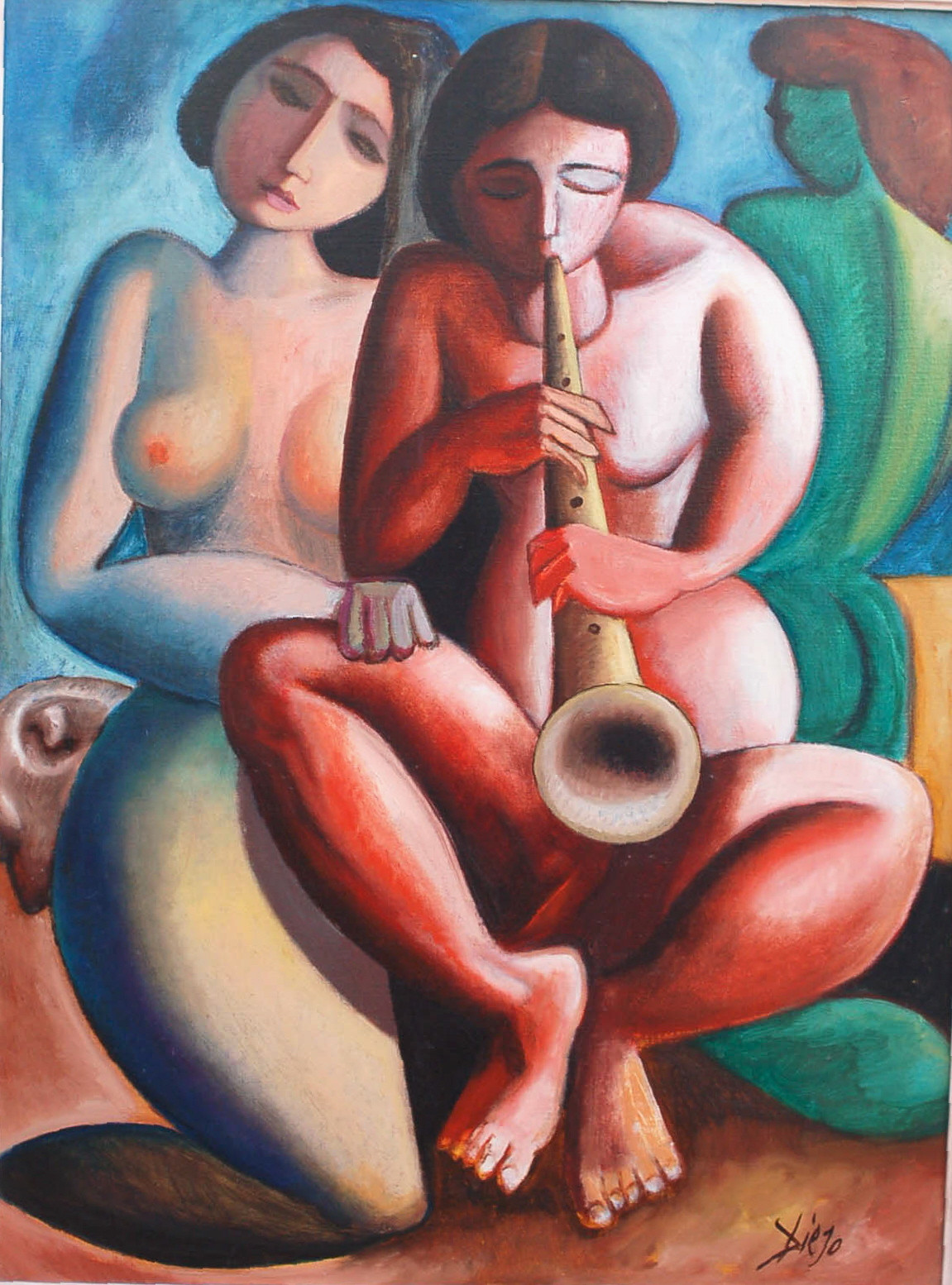
Jeune homme musicien, 31 x 23in, Private Collection LBD

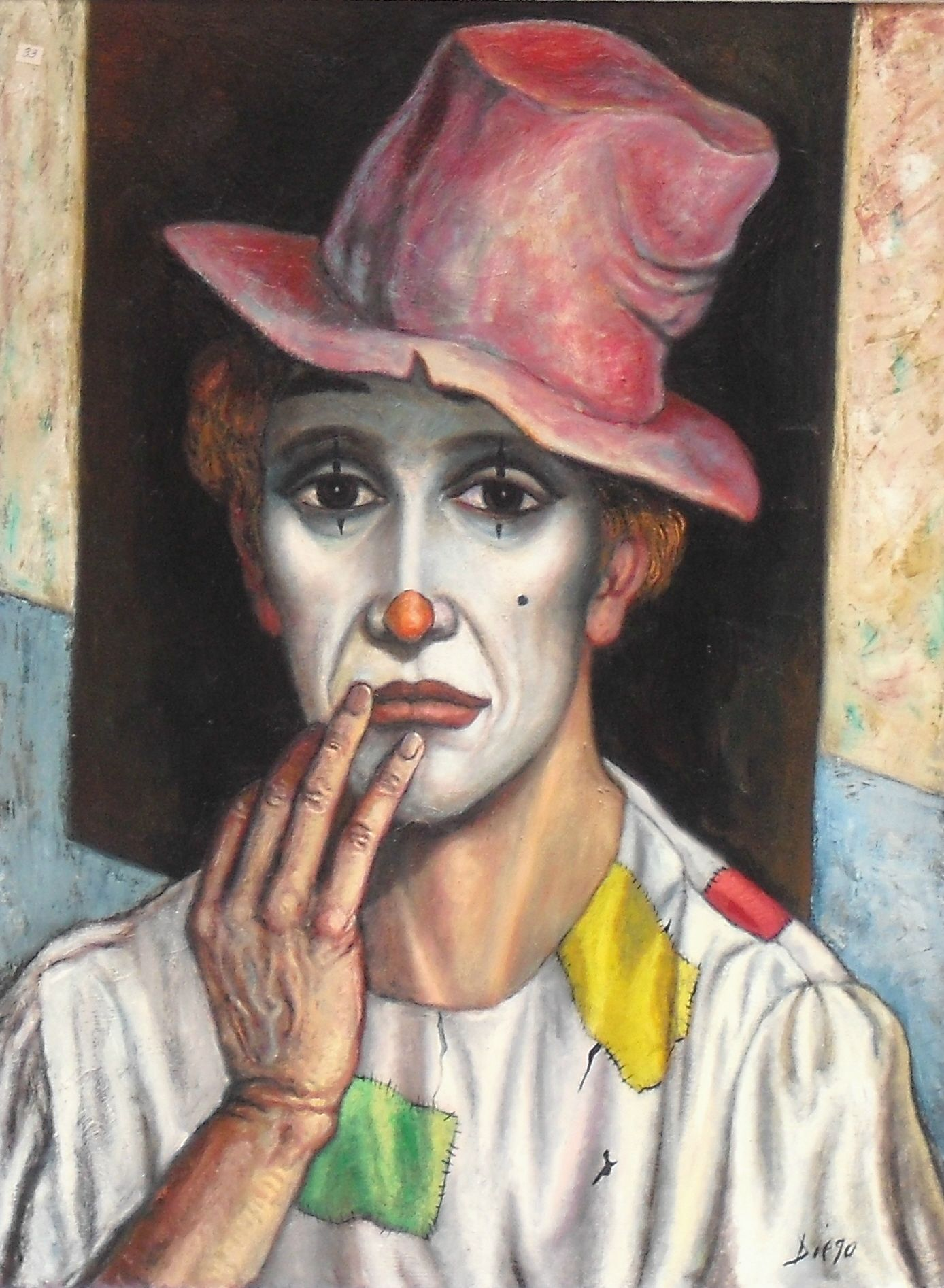
Guignol en Chapeau rouge (ca.1972), 23.5 x 31.5in, Private Collection - Notable

Landscapes

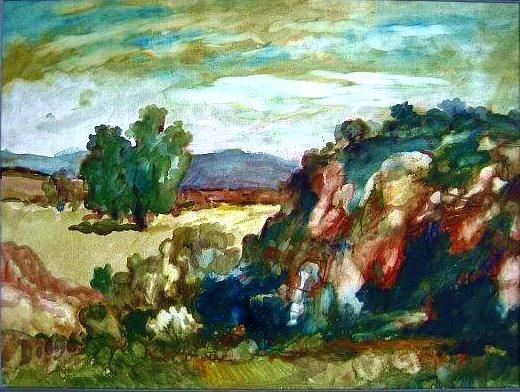
Landscape (ca.1968), Oil on Canvas, 24 x 30in, Private Collection RT

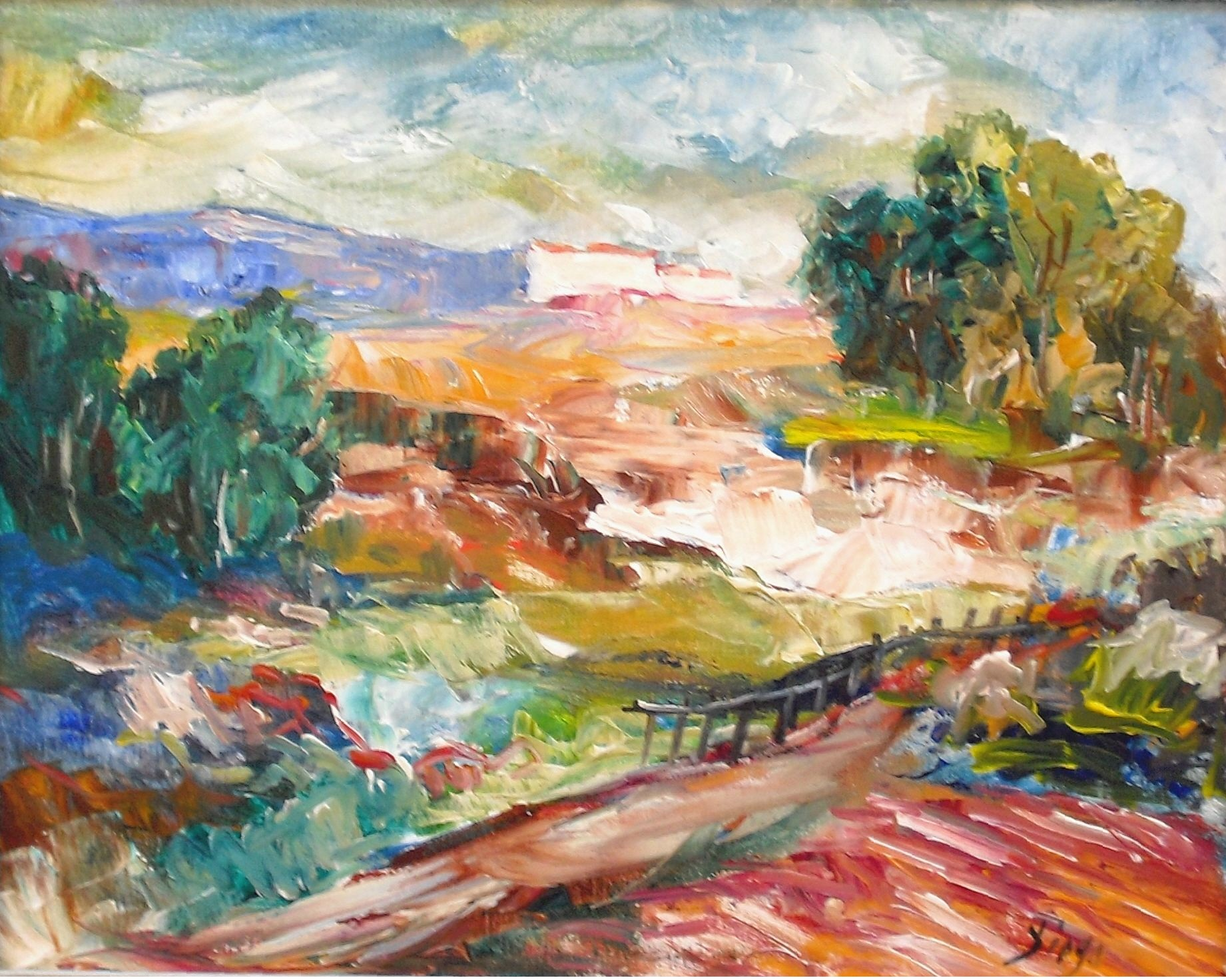
Paesaggio Landscape (ca.1968), 16 x 19.7in, Private Collection

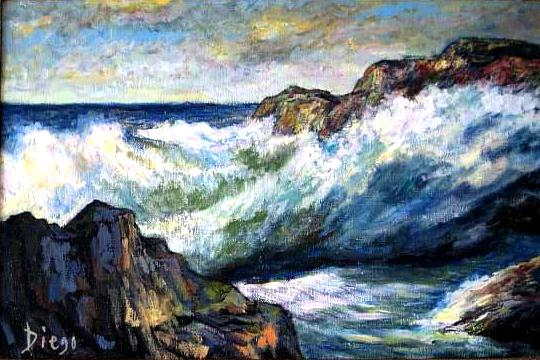
Ocean Scene (ca.1968), Oil on Canvas, 24 x 30in, Private Collection RT

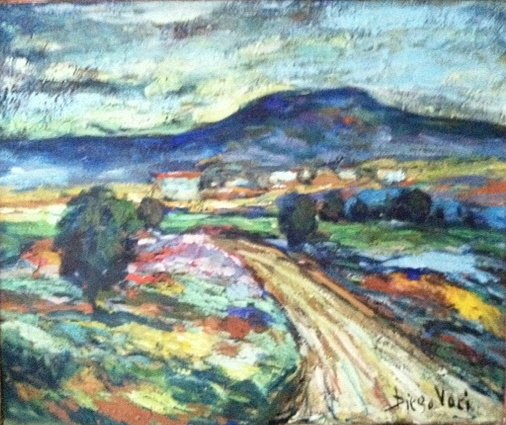
Tuscan Landscape, Oil on Canvas,18 x 24in, Private Collection CV

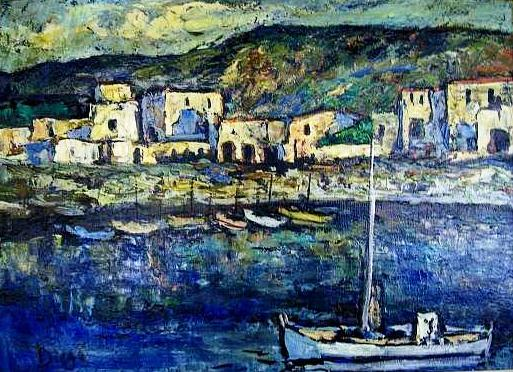
Marina (ca.1968), Oil on Canvas 24 x 30in, Private Collection RT

Horses/Boats

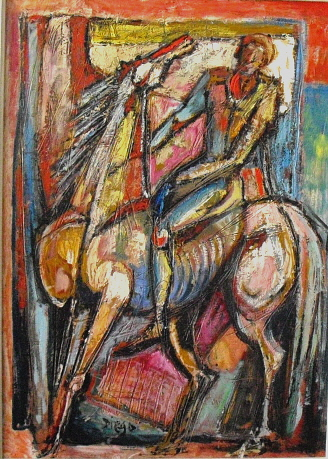
Cavaliere (1970), 19.5 x 28.5in, Private Collection - Notable

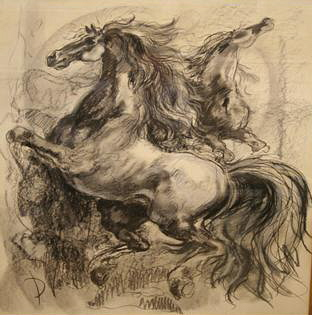
Horse (Charcoal), 35.5 x 27.5in, Private Collection - Notable

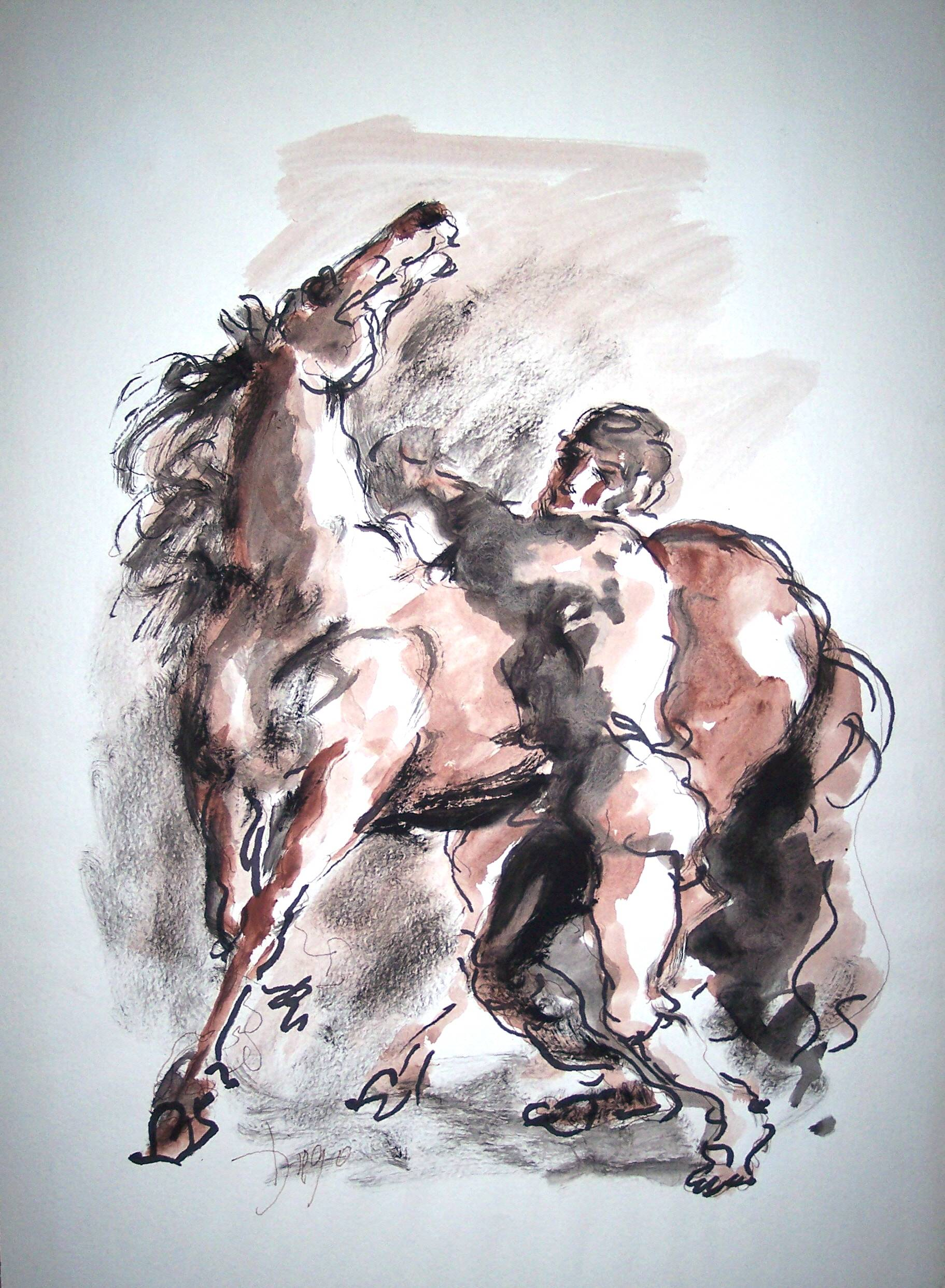
"Man and Horse" Ink and Watercolor 30" x 22 ½", Private Collection

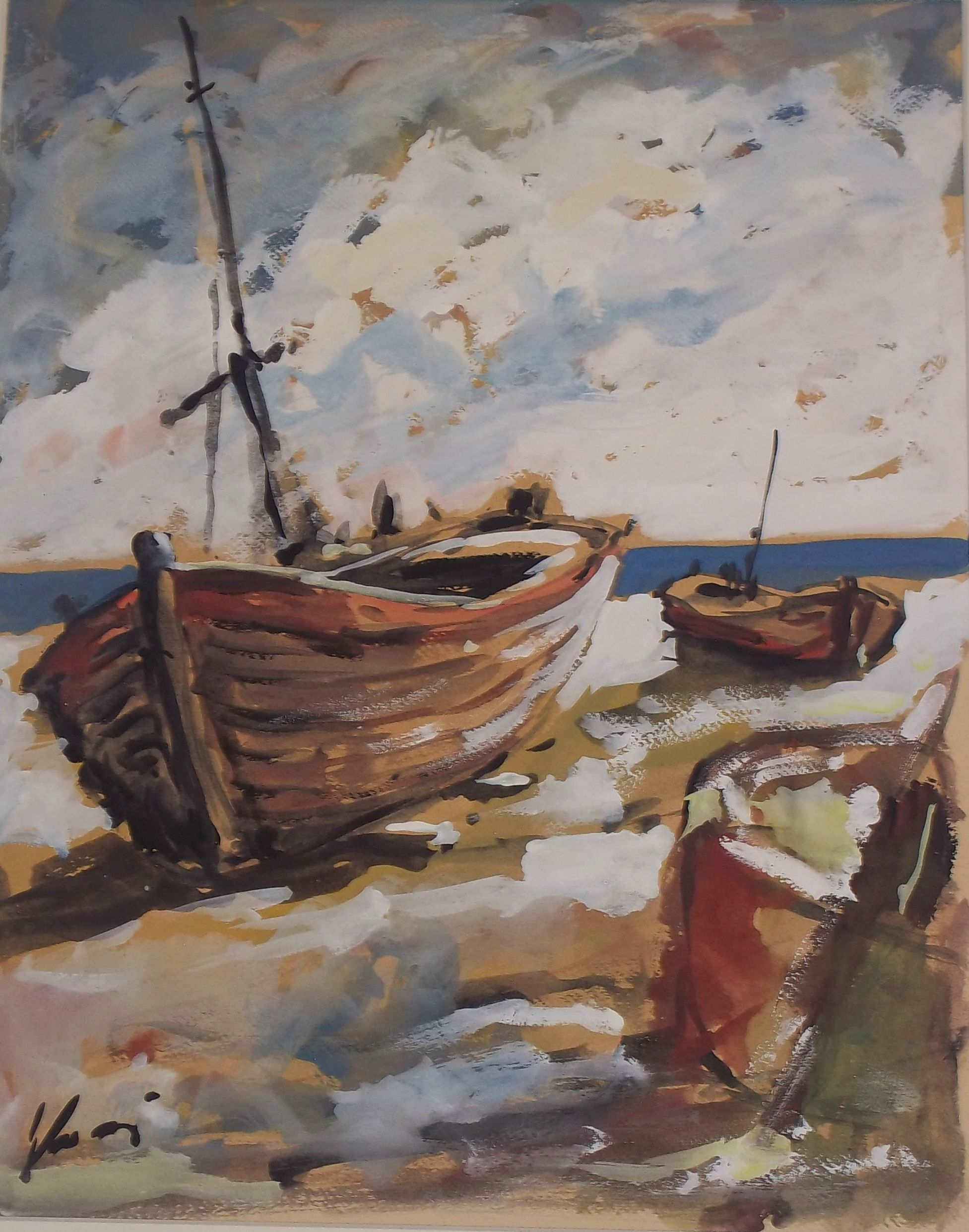
Schiff (tempera), 27.5 x 19.6in, Private Collection JR

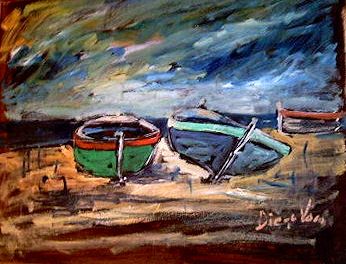
Boote am Strand, Oil on Canvas, Private Collection DA

Signatures

Pre–1957: There is no physical evidence discovered yet for signatures nor any art works of any kind from childhood until those gift drawings in the possession of Anthony Voci, Diego's nephew (noted above) which were signed "D. Voci 1957"

1962–1965: Schlossgalerie works signed "A.Voci", advertised as "Antonio Voci" (no Diego).

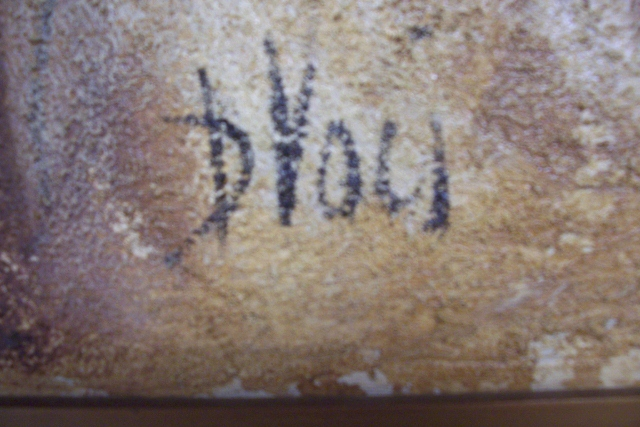
1962–1965: Works submitted to other than Schossgalerie, such as Globart in Milan, Officer's Club Aviano Air Base, etc. mostly "D. Voci".

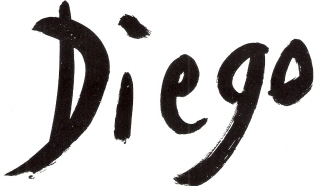
1965–1985: Naffouj Galerie, Landstuhl, Germany made a 5-year agreement under which the "Diego" signature came into prominence on his art. He was advertised as "Antonio Diego", dropping the Voci name. After the Naffouj agreements expired, the "Diego" signature continued to adorn the majority of works for the remaining 15 years of Diego's life.

1965–1985: Works that were sold outside of the Naffouj and Dahms agreements were mostly signed some form of Voci: "A. Voci", "D. Voci", and "Diego Voci".
