= List of people from Calabria =

List of people from the region of Calabria:

== Notable Calabrians ==
- Achille Falcone, 16th-century composer
- Achille Manfredini, 19th-century architect, engineer and active in the Art Nouveau Movement
- Achille Talarico, 19th-century painter of the Neapolitan School
- Acrion, Pythagorean philosopher
- Ada Dondini, actress
- Adele Cambria, actress, journalist and writer
- Agostino Li Vecchi, member of Italian basketball team at 2000 Olympics
- Antonio Aiello, singer/songwriter
- Alba Florio, poet
- Alcmaeon of Croton, ancient philosopher/medical theorist who pioneered anatomical dissection
- Alessandro De Rose, champion cliff diver
- Alessandro Longo, 19th-century composer and musicologist
- Alexis, ancient comic poet
- Alfonso Rendano, 19th-century pianist and composer who invented the "third pedal"
- Alfredo Costanzo, Australian motor racing driver born in Calabria
- Alfredo Valente (photographer), photographer, singer, painter and art collector
- Aloysius Lilius, 16th-century astronomer who created the Gregorian Calendar
- Amyris of Sybaris, consulted the Delphic oracle
- Annalisa Insarda, film, television, theatre and voice actress
- Andy Varipapa, professional bowler called "the greatest one-man bowling show on Earth"
- Angelo Arciglione, international prize-winning pianist
- Angelo Maria Mazzia, 19th-century artist and Knight of the Order of the Crown of Italy
- Angelo Savelli, painter
- Anna Barbaro, paralympic triathlete who won silver medal at the 2020 Summer Paralympics
- Anna Maria Maiolino, artist
- Anselmo Lorecchio, lawyer, journalist, politician, poet, writer and newspaper founder
- Antonella Della Porta, film actress
- Antonino Spirlì, actor, author and journalist
- Antonio Cantafora, film and television actor
- Antonio Diego Voci, figurative artist and sculptor
- Antonio D'Oppido, champion swimmer
- Antonio Fava, actor/director, comedian, musician and Maestro of Commedia dell'arte
- Antonio Fuoco, motor racing driver
- Antonio Maria Magro, actor, director and screenwriter
- Antonio Porchia, poet
- Antonio Pujía, artist and sculptor
- Antonio Restelli, cyclist who competed in the 1900 Summer Olympics
- Antonio Rodotà, former Director General of the European Space Agency
- Antonio Serra, late 16th-century philosopher and economist
- Antonio Siciliano, film editor
- Antonio Strati, organizational theorist and artist
- Antonio Tallura, actor and writer
- Antony Carbone, film and television actor
- Arignote, pythagorean philosopher
- Aristomachus of Croton, ancient party leader of Croton during the Hannibalian war
- Aroldo Tieri, actor
- Astylos of Croton, ancient olympic athlete
- Autoleon, ancient war hero
- Baldassarre Squitti, teacher of law and politician
- Barlaam of Seminara, 14th-century humanist Greek teacher to Petrarch and Boccaccio
- Benito Carbone, football manager
- Bernardino Telesio, 16th-century philosopher and first of the modern scientists
- Blessed Camillus Costanzo, 16th-century Jesuit missionary and Roman Catholic martyr
- Blessed Elena Aiello, founder of "Sister Minims of The Passion of Our Lord Jesus Christ"
- Blessed Francesco Maria Greco, co-founder of "Little Workers of the Sacred Hearts"
- Blessed Francesco Mottola, founder of the "Secular Institute of the Oblates of the Sacred Heart"
- Blessed Gaetana Tolomeo, venerable, Servant of God and religious radio host of "Radio Maria"
- Blessed Maria Candida of the Eucharist, Discalced Carmelite nun and mystic
- Blessed Mariantonia Samà, known as the "Little Sister of Saint Bruno"
- Bohemond I of Antioch, Prince of Taranto and Antioch
- Bruno Amantea, physician and surgeon
- Bruno Chimirri, equestrian who competed in the 2004 Olympic Games
- Brunori Sas, singer/songwriter
- Calliphon of Croton, pythagorean physician
- Carlo Carlei, film director
- Carlo Musitano, 17th-century priest and physician
- Carmelo Zito, journalist and newspaper editor
- Carmine Abate, writer and novelist
- Cassiodorus, founder of the Vivarium Monastery who put together the first western bible
- Cesare Berlingeri, contemporary artist
- Cesare Lanza, journalist and author
- Charles Atlas, bodybuilder
- Cicco Simonetta, Renaissance statesman who composed a treatise on cryptography
- Clearchus of Rhegium, ancient sculptor
- Clinomachus, Megarian philosopher
- Corrado Alvaro, writer and journalist
- Cosimo Schepis, artist, sculptor and art restorer
- Cristiano Caccamo, actor
- Cylon of Croton, led a revolt against the Pythagoreans
- Damo, Pythagorean philosopher
- Daniele Lavia, member of Italian men's national volleyball team
- Dario Cirisano, Winter Youth Olympic Gold winning Ice Dancer
- Davi Wornel, singer-songwriter, composer and producer
- Demetrio Nava, jurist, priest, polymath and historian
- Democedes, ancient physician that Herodotus called "the most skillful physician of his time"
- Dick Danello, singer and composer
- Diego Carpitella, professor of ethnomusicology
- Diognetus of Croton, ancient athlete
- Domenico Berardi, youngest footballer to score 4 goals in a "Serie A" match since 1931
- Domenico Caruso, writer, poet and scholar of Calabrian dialects
- Domenico Siciliani, General and Deputy Governor of Cyrenaica
- Domenico Spanò Bolani, historian and writer
- Domingo F. Periconi, 20th-century artist
- Donatella Versace, Vice-President and chief designer of Versace Group
- Egor Tropeano, winter swimmer and swimming coach
- El Presidente, musician/singer/record producer
- Eleonora Bilotta, human-computer interaction researcher and author
- Eleuterio Francesco Fortino, awarded Catholic priest who improved relations between the Catholic and Orthodox churches during his service
- Elio Veltri, journalist and politician
- Elisabetta Gregoraci, model and television personality
- Elsa Serrano, fashion designer
- Emilio Bulgarelli, won gold team medal in water polo at the 1948 London Olympics
- Enrico Salfi, 19th-century painter of biblical/Roman subjects
- Enzo Mirigliani, patron of Miss Italy beauty contest
- Eratosthenes of Croton, ancient athlete
- Erminio Blotta, sculptor
- Ernesto Chiminello, general in World War II
- Eugene De Rosa, 20th-century architect
- Eugene Gaudio, cinematographer for 1916 version of "20,000 Leagues Under the Sea"
- Eugenio Tano, 19th-century painter
- Eurytus, Ancient philosopher
- Fabio Mollo, film director and screenwriter
- Fabio Salerno, Catholic Priest and 2nd Personal Papal Secretary to Pope Francis
- Fabrizio Ruffo, cardinal and politician who led the Sanfedismo movement
- Fausto Torrefranca, musicologist and critic
- Felice DeMatteo, composer, arranger and bandmaster
- Ferdinando di Diano, mathematician, abbot, philosopher and theologist
- Ferruccio Baffa Trasci, 17th-century bishop, theologian and philosopher
- Filippo De Nobili, writer and poet
- Flavia Fortunato, singer, actress and television presenter
- Florestano Pepe, 19th-century Italian patriot
- Fortunato Arena, actor and stuntman
- Francesco Acri, 19th-century philosopher and historian of philosophy
- Francesco Altimari, scholar in the field of Albanology
- Francesco Amico, Roman Catholic theologian, professor and chancellor
- Francesco Anile, opera tenor
- Francesco Antonio Santori, 19th-century writer, poet and playwright
- Francesco Cilea, 19th-century opera composer
- Francesco Colelli, baroque painter
- Francesco Cozza, 17th-century Baroque artist
- Francesco Domenico Chiarello, Knight of Vittorio Veneto who saw action in both World Wars
- Francesco Fiorentino, philosopher and historiographer
- Francesco Florimo, 19th-century archivist, musicologist, music historian and composer
- Francesco Jacomoni, 20th-century diplomat and governor of Albania
- Francesco Jerace, sculptor
- Francesco Manuel Bongiorno, professional cyclist
- Francesco La Monaca, painter and sculptor
- Francesco Leonetti, poet, novelist and art critic
- Francesco Misiano, communist politician and film producer
- Francesco Panetta, champion long-distance runner
- Francesco Pianeta, heavyweight boxer
- Francesco Pignata, champion javelin thrower
- Francesco Raffaello Santoro, painter
- Francesco Reda, professional road bicycle racer
- Francesco Repaci, politician, socialist and anti-fascist
- Francesco Sambiasi, 16th-century Catholic missionary to China
- Francesco Saverio Mergalo, 18th-century painter
- Francesco Saverio Salfi, writer, politician and librettist
- Francesco Smalto, fashion designer
- Fran Hauser, venture capitalist, digital media executive and philanthropist
- Gaetano Scorza, mathematician who inspired the theory of "Scorza varieties"
- Gennaro Gattuso, footballer
- Gesualdo Penna, champion senior sprinter
- Giandomenico Martoretta, 16th-century Baroque composer
- Gianna Maria Canale, model and actress
- Gianni Amelio, film director
- Gianni De Luca, comic book artist, illustrator, painter and etcher
- Gianni Versace, fashion designer and founder of Versace Group
- Gigi Peronace, football agent
- Gioachino Greco, 17th-century champion chess player
- Giacomo Marramao, philosopher and teacher
- Gino Chiellino, writer, editor, translator and literary scholar
- Gino Renni, actor, comedian and singer
- Giorgio Campanella, professional boxer
- Giorgio Miceli, opera composer
- Giovanni Andrea Serrao, intellectual who supported the Parthenopaean Republic of 1799
- Giovanni Angelo Criscuolo, 16th-century Renaissance painter
- Giovanni Battista Palatino, 16th-century Renaissance master calligrapher whose name was given to the Palatino typeface
- Giovanni Battista Zupi, 16th-century astronomer who discovered that the planet Mercury had orbital phases
- Giovanni De Gennaro, Police officer and Chairman of Defense Group Leonardo
- Giovanni Francesco Gemelli Careri, 17th-century adventurer and traveler
- Giovanni Francesco Mormando, 15th-century architect
- Giovanni Leonardo di Bona, first international chess tournament winner
- Giovanni Lorenzo d'Anania, 16th-century geographer and theologian
- Giovanni Luca Conforti, 16th-century composer and prominent falsetto singer
- Giovanni Nicotera, 19th-century Italian patriot and politician
- Giovanni Parisi, gold medal winning boxer at the 1988 Seoul Olympics
- Giovanni Tocci, professional diver
- Giovanni Valentino Gentile, 16th-century humanist and non-Trinitarian
- Giovanni Vincenzo Gravina, 17th-century author, academic and jurist
- Girolamo de Rada, 19th-century writer of Italo-Albanian literature
- Giulio Variboba, 18th-century poet and priest
- Giuseppe Albanese, classical pianist
- Giuseppe Antonio Sorbilli, sculptor
- Giuseppe Bardari, writer
- Giuseppe Ciro, racing driver
- Giuseppe Coniglio, poet
- Giuseppe Faraca, won young rider classification in the 1981 Giro d'Italia
- Giuseppe Filianoti, lyric tenor
- Giuseppe Lagrotteria, weightlifter who competed at the 1984 Summer Olympics
- Giuseppe Leuzzi, journalist, essayist, writer and author
- Giuseppe Lo Schiavo, visual artist
- Giuseppe Musolino, outlaw/folk hero
- Giuseppe Novelli, geneticist
- Giuseppe Petitto, award-winning film director
- Giuseppe Sensi, cardinal and Vatican diplomat
- Giuseppe Vincenzo Ciaccio, anatomist whose name is associated with lacrimal glands called "Ciaccio's glands"
- Giuseppina Macrì, won bronze medal at the 2001 World Judo Championships in Munich
- Giusy Versace, paralympic athlete and television presenter
- Glycon of Croton, ancient athlete
- Goffredo Zehender, Racing Driver
- Gregorio Carafa, Prince and Grand Master of the Order of Malta
- Gregorio Preti, 17th-century Baroque artist and brother of Mattia Preti
- Gregorio Scalise, Poet and Dramatist
- Guglielmo Pepe, 19th-century general and patriot
- Guglielmo Verdirame, member of the House of Lords, King's Counsel, and professor of law at King's College London
- Guglielmo Sirleto, 16th-century cardinal and scholar
- Guido Daniele, internationally renowned body painting artist
- Henry Aristippus, religious scholar and writer in Norman Kingdom of Sicily
- Hippostratus of Croton, ancient athlete
- Ibycus, ancient lyric poet
- Isabela de Rosis, religious sister and congregation founder
- Isomachus of Croton, ancient athlete
- Janus Parrhasius, 16th-century humanist who founded the Cosentian Academy in 1511
- Jimi Bertucci, singer, songwriter, musician and composer
- Joachim of Fiore, 12th-century mystic and theologian
- John Italus, 11th-century Byzantine philosopher
- John XVI, 10th-century antipope
- Jone Salinas, film actress
- Karmel Kandreva, writer and poet
- Leonardo Vinci, 18th-century composer
- Leonzio Pilato, 14th-century humanist and Western Europe's first Professor of Greek
- Leopoldo Trieste, actor, film director and script writer
- Linda Lanzillotta, member of Italy-USA Foundation and founder/President of GLOCUS Think Tank
- Loredana Bertè, singer
- Lorenzo Calafiore, champion wrestler
- Louiselle, singer
- Luciano Rispoli, television/radio writer and presenter
- Lucio Parrillo, fantasy artist
- Luigi Miceli, 19th-century Italian patriot, politician and military figure
- Luigi Ruffo-Scilla, Catholic Cardinal and Archbishop of Naples
- Luigi Tripepi, Catholic Cardinal and poet
- Lycinus of Croton, ancient athlete
- Mac Cara, American baseball player
- Manuela Zoccali, astronomer
- Marcello Fonte, actor
- Marcello Guido, deconstructivist architect
- Marco Aurelio Severino, surgeon, anatomist and author
- Marco Cardisco, 16th-century Renaissance artist
- Maria Antonia Braile, writer who was the first Albanian woman to ever publish literature in Albanian
- Maria Latella, multimedia journalist, columnist, TV anchor woman and interviewer
- Maria Perrotta, classical pianist
- Maria Perrusi, Miss Italia 2009
- Maria Voce, lawyer and former President of the Focolare Movement
- Mariangela Perrupato, synchronized swimmer
- Marina Ripa di Meana, actress, director, writer, stylist, activist and TV personality
- Mario Alicata, Italian Partisan, literary critic and politician
- Mario Tricoci, hairstylist-entrepreneur
- Marion A. Trozzolo, inventor of the Teflon coated frying pan
- Massimiliano Mondello, professional table tennis player who competed at the 2004 Summer Olympics
- Matilde Ciccia, actress and professional ice dancer
- Mattia Preti, 17th-century Baroque artist
- Maurizio Leone, champion long-distance runner
- Mauro Fiore, Academy Award Winning Cinematographer for the movie "Avatar"
- Melinno, ancient lyric poet
- Mia Martini, singer
- Michelangelo Falvetti, 17th-century Baroque composer
- Michelangelo La Neve, comics writer and screenwriter
- Michele D’Oppido, professional swimmer
- Michele Guerrisi, artist and writer
- Michele Morrone, actor, model, singer and fashion designer
- Michele Pane, 19th–20th-century symbolist poet and journalist
- Milo of Croton, ancient olympic athlete
- Mimmo Calopresti, film director, screenwriter, producer and actor
- Mimmo Candito, Italian war correspondent
- Mimmo Rotella, 20th-century poet and contemporary artist who invented the Decollage
- Mino Reitano, singer-songwriter and actor
- Natuzza Evolo, Catholic mystic and Servant of God
- Nazzareno Natale, Actor
- Niccolò Lapiccola, 18th-century artist
- Nicholas Musuraca, cinematographer and pioneer of film noir
- Nicholas of Crotone, 13th-century bilingual bishop known for his role in the reconciliation of the Eastern Orthodox and Roman Catholic churches
- Nick Mancuso, actor of stage and screen
- Nick Nostro, film director
- Nicola Antonio Manfroce, 19th-century composer
- Nicola Calipari, military intelligence officer
- Nicola Squitti, Italian senator and diplomat
- Nik Spatari, painter, sculptor and architect
- Ninetto Davoli, actor
- Nossis, ancient epigrammist and poet
- Nuccio Ordine, literary critic and professor of Italian literature
- Nuccio Schepis, artist, sculptor and art restorer
- Occhiali, 16th-century Ottoman admiral
- Ofelia Giudicissi Curci, poet and archeologist
- Orfeo Reda, painter and artist
- Oreste Moricca, gold medal winning fencer at the 1924 Paris Olympics
- Osvaldo Paladini, distinguished admiral
- Otello Profazio, folk singer-songwriter and author
- Paolo Antonio Foscarini, 16th-century scientist who wrote about the mobility of the earth
- Paolo Serrao, teacher of musical theory and composition
- Pasquale Anselmo, actor and voice actor
- Pasquale Carpino, celebrity chef
- Pasquale Galluppi, 19th-century philosopher
- Paul Néri, professional cyclist
- Peppino Mazzotta, actor
- Peter Carravetta, philosopher, poet, literary theorist and translator
- Phayllos of Croton, ancient athlete who outfitted and commanded a ship at the Battle of Salamis
- Philippus of Croton, ancient olympic athlete and war hero
- Philistion of Locri, ancient physician and writer on medicine
- Philolaus, pythagorean and presocratic philosopher
- Phintys, pythagorean philosopher
- Pier Francesco Pingitore, director, screenwriter, playwright and author
- Pierpaolo Parisio, Cardinal who was one of the Presidents of the Council of Trent at its first session in 1542
- Pietro Campana, engraver
- Pietro Delle Piane, actor and TV personality
- Pietro Negroni, 16th-century Renaissance artist
- Pietro Paolo Bombino, 16th-century Italian Jesuit, orator, theologian, historian and 1st biographer of Edmund Campion
- Pino Arlacchi, sociologist and politician
- Polissena Ruffo, Princess and first wife to Francesco Sforza
- Pope Anterus, 3rd-century pope and saint
- Pope Dionysius, 3rd-century pope and saint
- Pope John VII, 8th-century pope
- Pope Telesphorus, 2nd-century pope and saint
- Pope Zachary, 8th-century pope and saint
- Pope Zosimus, 5th-century pope and saint
- Proclus of Rhegium, ancient physician
- Quintus Laronius, Roman military officer and Senator
- Quinzio Bongiovanni, scholar of philosophy
- Raf Vallone, actor and international film star
- Raffaele Conflenti, aeronautical engineer and aircraft designer
- Raffaele Piria, 19th-century chemist who discovered the major component of Aspirin
- Regina Catrambone, philanthropist and co-founder of Migrant Offshore Aid Station
- Renato Dulbecco, Nobel Prize winning virologist
- Renato Turano, politician/businessman and founder of Turano Baking Company
- Rhys Coiro, film, television and stage actor
- Riccardo Pizzuti, actor and stuntman
- Rino Barillari, King of Paparazzi
- Rino Gaetano, singer-songwriter
- Roberto Russo, pianist and composer
- Roberto Sgambelluri, professional racing cyclist
- Rocco B. Commisso, founder of Mediacom Communications Corporation
- Rocco Granata, singer-songwriter who wrote the hit song "Marina"
- Rocco Jemma, professor of Pediatric Medicine
- Rocco Pantaleo, restauranteur, businessman and philanthropist
- Rocco Verduci, 19th-century Italian revolutionary and martyr of the 1847 Two Sicilies Insurrection
- Rocky Gattellari, professional boxer and businessman
- Roger II of Sicily, Duke of Apulia and Calabria and 1st King of Sicily
- Rosalba Forciniti, won bronze medal in Judo at the 2012 London Olympics
- Rosario Rubbettino, founded publishing house Rubbettino Editore
- Rosella Postorino, award winning author
- Rubens Santoro, painter
- Saint Alexander of Constantinople, Bishop of Byzantium and 1st Archbishop of Constantinople
- Saint Bartholomew the Younger, 970–1055, abbot of Grottaferrata
- Saint Fantinus, 927–1000
- Saint Francis of Paola, 1416–1507, patron saint of Calabria
- Saint Gaetano Catanoso, 1879–1963
- Saint Gregor von Burtscheid, 940–999
- Saint Himerius of Cremona, Bishop – died 560
- Saint Humilis of Bisignano, 1582–1637
- Saint Luca Antonio Falcone, 1669–1739
- Saint Nicodemus of Mammola, 900–990
- Saint Nicola Saggio, born 1650 Longobardi – died 1709 Rome
- Saint Nilo of Rossano, 910–1005, founded the monastery of Grottaferrata
- Salvatore Albano, sculptor
- Salvatore Frega, composer of cultured contemporary and experimental music
- Salvatore Petruolo, painter
- Salvatore Pisani, sculptor
- Salvatore Settis, archeologist and art historian
- Sandra Savaglio, award-winning astrophysicist and author
- Santi Paladino, journalist, politician and writer
- Santo Versace, President and Co-CEO of Versace Group
- Sergio Cammariere, jazz singer-songwriter
- Sergio Laganà, professional road cyclist
- Sergio Pastore, film director and screenwriter
- Silvio Vigliaturo, glassfusion maestro
- Simon of Bisignano, teacher of canon law
- Simone Borrelli, actor, director, singer-songwriter and musician
- Simone Rosalba, volleyball player and member of the 1998 world championship Gold Medal Team
- Stefano De Sando, actor and voice actor
- Stefano Mancuso, Botanist, Director of Intl Lab of Plant Neurobiology and Editor of Plant Signalling and Behaviour Journal
- Stefano Patrizi, jurist and scholar
- Stefano Rodotà, jurist, politician, academic and author
- Stesichorus, ancient lyric poet
- Steve Conte, actor
- Tatiana Trouvé, contemporary visual artist and sculptor
- Teresa Macrì, art critic, curator and writer
- Theagenes of Rhegium, ancient literary critic
- Timaeus of Locri, pythagorean philosopher
- Tisicrates of Croton, ancient athlete
- Tito Arecchi, physicist who contributed to laser physics and quantum optics
- Tito Minniti, Italian Royal Air Force Hero of World War 2
- Tobia Giuseppe Loriga, Italian and IBF International Light Middleweight Boxing Champion
- Tommaso Campanella, 16th-century Renaissance philosopher, theologian, astrologer and poet
- Tommaso Martini, late-Baroque painter
- Tony Condello, professional wrestler and promoter
- Tony Gaudio, Academy Award Winning Cinematographer for the movie "Anthony Adverse"
- Tony Nardi, actor, playwright, director and producer
- Tony Parisi, former WWWF and WWF wrestling champion
- Umberto Boccioni, 20th-century futurist, painter and sculptor
- Vincent Canadé, 20th-century artist
- Vincenza Petrilli, paralympic archer who won silver medal at 2020 Summer Paralympics
- Vincenzo Caglioti, chemist and academician
- Vincenzo Chimirri, equestrian who competed in the 2004 Olympic Games
- Vincenzo Di Benedetto, classical philologist
- Vincenzo Dorsa, Arbëresh scholar, writer and translator
- Vincenzo Florio Sr., entrepreneur and politician
- Vincenzo Fondacaro, sailor, navy captain and merchant officer
- Vincenzo Iaquinta, footballer
- Vincenzo Lauro, Papal diplomat, Bishop and Cardinal
- Vincenzo Milione, painter
- Vincenzo Musolino, actor, director, producer and screenwriter
- Vincenzo Scaramuzza, international pianist and music teacher
- Vincenzo Talarico, screenwriter and film actor
- Vincenzo Valente, composer and writer
- Vittoria Belvedere, film and television actress
- Zaleucus, devised the Western world's first code of law
