= Colella =

Colella is a surname from various regions of central-southern Italy, chiefly Apulia and Campania but also Lazio, Abruzzo and Molise. It derives from a diminutive and apheretic form of the given name Nicola. Notable people with the surname include:

- Ann Marie Buerkle (née Colella; born 1951), American nurse, attorney and politician
- Anthony Colella (born 1975), Australian rugby union player
- Anton Colella, Scottish businessman
- Antonio Colella (born 1961), Italian rugby union player and sports director
- Giovanni Colella (born 1966), Italian soccer manager
- Hugo Colella (born 1999), French soccer player
- Jenn Colella (born 1974), American actress and singer
- Laura Colella, American filmmaker
- Leonardo Colella (1930–2010), known as Nardo, Brazilian soccer player
- Lynn Colella (born 1950), American swimmer
- Maurizio Colella (born 1976), known as EDX, Swiss DJ and music producer
- Phillip Colella (born 1952), American applied mathematician
- Rick Colella (born 1951), American swimmer, brother of Lynn
- Tommy Colella (1918–1992), American football player

== See also ==
- Colella, an unaccepted name for a genus of sea squirts in suborder Aplousobranchia
- Colelli
