= Oppido =

Oppido may refer to:

- Oppido Lucano, Italian municipality of the Province of Potenza, Basilicata, Italy
- Oppido Mamertina, Italian municipality of the Province of Reggio Calabria, Calabria, Italy

== See also ==
- Oppidum, a large fortified Iron Age settlement
- D'Oppido, a surname
