= D'Oppido =

D'Oppido is an Italian surname. Notable people with the surname include:

- Antonio D'Oppido (born 1944), Italian swimmer
- Michele D'Oppido (born 1949), Italian swimmer, brother of Antonio
