= Tiziano Panconi =

Italian art historian

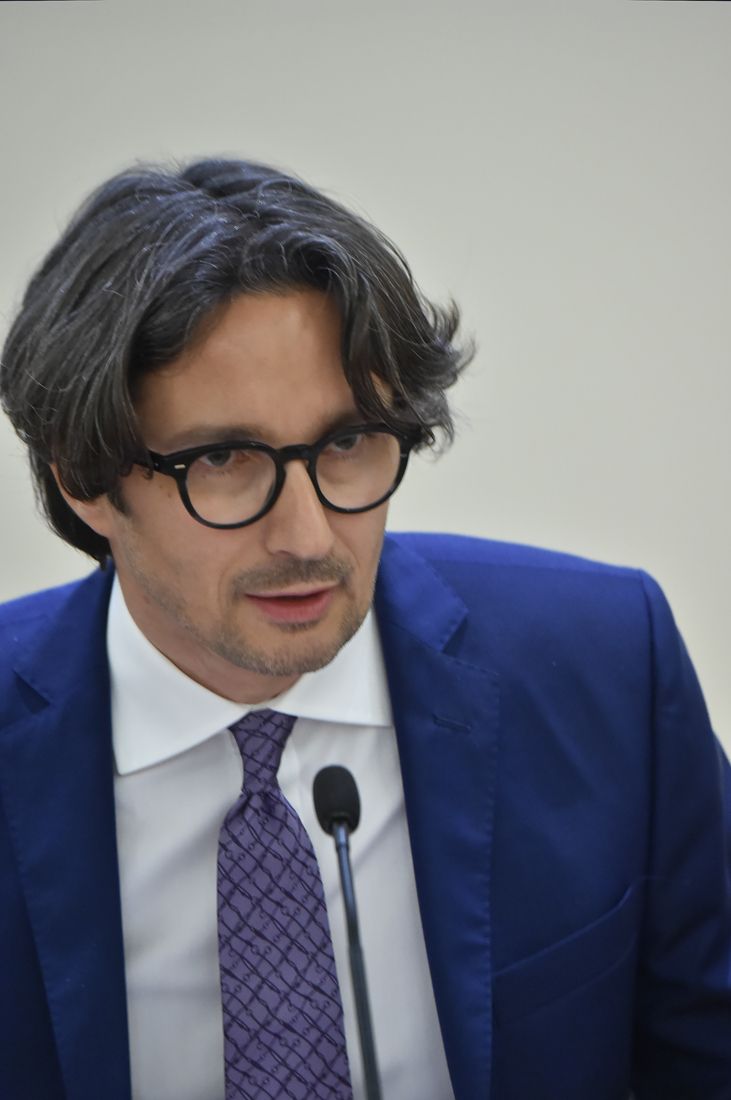
Tiziano Panconi

Tiziano Panconi (born September 2, 1969) is an Italian art historian. He is specializing in Italian painting of the 19th century, in particular of Macchiaioli and Giovanni Boldini.

== Life and career ==
Panconi was born in Pescia on September 2, 1969, into a family of antiquarians and collectors. At the age of 23, he held a personal exhibition at the Mentana gallery in Florence, entitled “The Floating Geometry”; a testimonial event for the Greenpeace campaign against whale hunting in Norway. He studied with the artist Massimo Biagi and then with Raffaele Monti. In 1998 Mario Murari (last living heir of Giovanni Boldini) assigned him the task of editing the general catalog of Boldini’s works.

Since then, he has focused on historical-critical studies, archival research, aesthetic and philological analysis, design, management, and curatorship of cultural exhibitions. In 1995 he organized the National Exhibition of Italian Painters of the 19th Century at Palazzo Arnolfini in Lucca.

In the early 2000s, he discovered the painting Dante and Beatrice's meeting of Vito D'Ancona. One of the most important canvasses of the painter known only through a publication of 1861, when it was exhibited by the artist to the Florentine Promoter, and dispersed since then, wandering around the English antique market as an Italian arts school of the nineteenth century. It was recognized and brought back to Italy for an exhibition. In 2001 he discovered and published a set of letters between artist Plinio Nomellini and fascist party official Lelio Ricci.

From 2008 to 2010 he was a consultant for the cultural initiatives of the Department of Tourism of the Municipality of Montecatini Terme, also collaborating with the Società Terme, the Cabinet Council, the Minister's Offices and State Undersecretaries of the Ministry for Cultural Heritage and Activities. In 2008, he brought to light the "Boldini-Cardona Archive", until then dispersed, that contains 370 photographs and unpublished letters which document, inter alia, the extramarital relationship between Emilia Cardona Boldini and the sculptor Francesco La Monaca. Piedmont journalist Emilia Cardona, at the age of 28, had married the 89 year old Giovanni Boldini in Paris. The publication of these documents cast a shadow on the philanthropist. From 2013 to 2015 Tiziano Panconi was the National President of the Area Cultura Conflavoro PMI. In 2015 he became Chairman of the Scientific Committee of the Bell'Italia exhibition promoted by the Municipality of Caorle.

He is the Scientific Director of the Butterfly Institute Fine Art in Lugano, Scientific Director of the 19th century Paintings Department of the Cambi Auction House of Genoa, Milan, London, Chairman of the Archives Museum Giovanni Boldini Macchiaioli, member of the Honorary Committee of the Capri Awards Foundation of New York, since 2015 also a founding partner and member of the FOEDUS Foundation Scientific Committee, President of ICCAP, International Conference for Culture, Art and Peace. Since 2016 he collaborates with the Link Campus in Rome and other universities in the capital. In January 2019 he chairs the international conference on Giovanni Boldini at the Senate of the Italian Republic, introduced by the institutional greeting of the President of the Council of Ministers, sponsored by the Italian Presidency and by MIBAC. In the same month, he was invited to proclaim a lectio magistralis about Giovanni Boldini at LUMSA University in Rome and, subsequently, he received the Pontevecchio Award in Florence.

In March 2020, in an interview in Radio24 by Gianluca Nicoletti he revealed that he had ADHD. He participated in the movie on the relationship between art and autism "Tommy e i cervelli ribelli" (Tommy and the rebellious brains) produced by Sky, in the role of himself.

In the same month the city of Ferrara appointed him director of the "Comitato di studio per le celebrazioni del novantesimo anno dalla morte di Giovanni Boldini" (Study Committee for the celebrations of the ninetieth year since the death of Giovanni Boldini) (2021), composed of 13 well-known art historians and whose president is Vittorio Sgarbi. On April 10 with Sgarbi, he signed an appeal on Corriere della Sera for the reopening of the museums closed due to the Coronavirus emergency. In the autumn-winter 2020-2021, at the Mart in Rovereto, he co-curates the exhibition “Boldini. Il piacere ", designed by Vittorio Sgarbi, with the critical contribution of Giordano Bruno Guerri. In the text of the catalog he explores the relationship between Boldini and D'Annunzio, publishing his unpublished and secret correspondence, also bringing for the first time to light the conceptual and stylistic debt of the poet towards the “fortunysmo”, the pictorial current belonging to the Spanish artist Marià Fortuny i Marsal.

== Curatorship ==
- 1999, Mostra culturale: Antologia dei Macchiaioli, Pistoia, Palazzo Comunale, Promossa dal Comune di Pistoia.
- 2000, Mostra culturale: Lodovico Tommasi grafico, Saletta d'Arte Viviani, Pisa.
- 2001, Montecatini Terme, I Post Macchiaioli, Galleria Mediarte.
- 2007, Mostra culturale: Renato Natali, Galleria Rotini, Castiglioncello.
- 2008, Mostra Culturale: Boldini Mon Amour, Terme Tamerici, Montecatini Terme, Promossa dal Comune di Montecatini Terme, Regione Toscana, Ministero per i Beni e le Attività Culturali.
- 2009-2010, Mostra Culturale: Il Nuovo dopo la Macchia, Terme Tamerici, Montecatini Terme, promossa dal Comune di Montecatini Terme, Regione Toscana, Ministero per i Beni e le Attività Culturali.
- 2011, Mostra Culturale: Signorini e il suo tempo, Milan, Spazio Techa.
- 2011, Mostra culturale: Boldini e la Belle Époque, Villa Olmo, Como, promossa dal Comune di Como.
- 2013, Mostra culturale: Cabianca, Butterfly Institute Fine Art, Lugano.
- 2014, Fattori & Friends, Butterfly Institute Fine Art, Lugano.
- 2015, Boldini e il suo tempo, Butterfly Institute Fine Art, Lugano.
- 2017, Giovanni Boldini, Arthemisia Group, Complesso del Vittoriano, Rome.
- 2017-18, Giovanni Boldini – genio e pittura, Arthemisia Group, Reggia di Venaria (TO).
- 2020-21, Boldini. Il Piacere, Museo Mart, Rovereto
- 2021, Boldini, dal disegno al dipinto, attorno alla contessa de Leusse, Castello Estense, Ferrara

== Works ==
- T. Panconi, Giovanni Boldini, L’uomo e la pittura, Pisa, Pacini Editore, 1998. ISBN 8877812141.
- T. Panconi, Giovanni Boldini, L’opera completa (catalogo generale ragionato), Firenze, Edifir, 2002. ISBN 9788879701525.
- T. Panconi, L’Ottocento, indagini etiche e estetiche per il collezionista d’arte, Pisa, Pacini Editore, 2005. ISBN 8877817305.
- T. Panconi, C. Rotini, C. Di Cesare, Renato Natali, catalogo della Mostra, Poggibonsi, Carlo Cambi Editore, 2007. ISBN 8888482660.
- T. Panconi (a cura di), Il Nuovo dopo la Macchia, origini e affermazione del Naturalismo Toscano, Pisa, Pacini Editore, 2008, 1ª ediz. ISBN 8877819936.
- T. Panconi (a cura di), Boldini Mon Amour, con presentazione del Ministro per i Beni e le attività Culturali S. Bondi e contributi critici di L. Angiolino, Pisa, Pacini Editore, 2008. ISBN 8863150338.
- T. Panconi (a cura di), Il Nuovo dopo la Macchia, origini e affermazione del Naturalismo Toscano, con presentazione del Ministro per i Beni e le attività Culturali S. Bondi e contributi critici di L. Angiolino, Pisa, Pacini Editore, 2009. ISBN 9788863151350.
- T. Panconi, S. Gaddi (a cura di), Boldini e la Belle Èpoque, Cinisello Balsamo, Silvana Editoriale, 2011. ISBN 9788836620173.
- T. Panconi, S. Cecchetto, E. Manzato, L. Turchi, Bell’Italia, La pittura di paesaggio dai Macchiaioli ai Neovedutisti veneti, 1850-1950, Venezia, Marsilio, 2015. ISBN 8831722670.
- A. Celi, con introduzione di T. Panconi, Maria Teresa Mazzei Fabbricotti, Firenze, Pagliai Polistampa, 2016. ISBN 8859610141.
- Giovanni Boldini, T. Panconi e S. Gaddi (a cura di), con presentazione del Ministro per i beni culturali e il turismo D. Franceschini, Milano, Skira, 2017. ISBN 8857235416.
- Giovanni Boldini, Genio e pittura, T. Panconi e S. Gaddi (a cura di), con presentazione del Ministro per i beni culturali e il turismo D. Franceschini, Milano, Skira, 2017, ISBN 9788857236988
- T. Panconi, Boldini e il ritratto Belle Epoque, in Boldini e il ritratto di Donna Franca Florio, a cura di M. Smolizza, Milano, Electa-Mondadori, 2018, ISBN 9788891816474
- T. Panconi, Telemaco Signorini, Catalogo generale ragionato delle opere dipinte, edito da Museo archives Giovanni Boldini Macchiaioli, Pistoia, luglio 2019, ISBN 9791220051149
