= Roberto Russo (musician) =

Italian pianist and composer

Roberto Russo (born 19 November 1966, Cosenza) is an Italian pianist and composer.

== Biography ==
He began piano studies with his father, Mario Russo, then followed piano Maestros Daniel Rivera, Franco Scala and Maria Tipo. Guest in various classical music festivals in Europe and America since 1985. As a composer, he studied in Italy with Silvano Sardi and Domenico Bartolucci; his compositions have been performed in Italy, France, Norway, Poland, Denmark and the USA.

His performing have been recorded or broadcast by Italian RAI, Radio Televisión Argentina, Houston Public Radio, Radio Vaticana, III Millennio Music Editions and Liszt Institute of Bologna (Italy). As a piano teacher he taught at various Italian Conservatories, giving also Masterclasses at Music University in Tromsø (Norway), at Conservatory of Music in Oviedo (Spain), at Academy of Music in Kraków (Poland) and at the National University of Music Bucharest (Romania).

Since 1998 he plays together with Italian tenor Alessandro Maffucci. He also premiered works by English composer Michael Stimpson. In 2012, he was appointed as a member of Steinway Artists by the prestigious piano brand of Hamburg and New York

== Reviews ==
Roberto Russo has been reviewed many times.

== Compositions ==
- Sonata for viola and piano (1993)
- Pater Noster, for "a cappella" choir (1995)
- In Monte Oliveti, for "a cappella" choir (1995)
- La rosa blanca, per mezzo-soprano e pianoforte (2000)
- Madre, for "a cappella" choir (2001)
- Ave Maria, for "a cappella" choir (2002)
- 12 Preludes for piano (2002)
- Fantasia for cello and piano (2008)

== Sources ==
- La rosa blanca, per mezzo-soprano e pianoforte (2000)
