= Regina Catrambone =

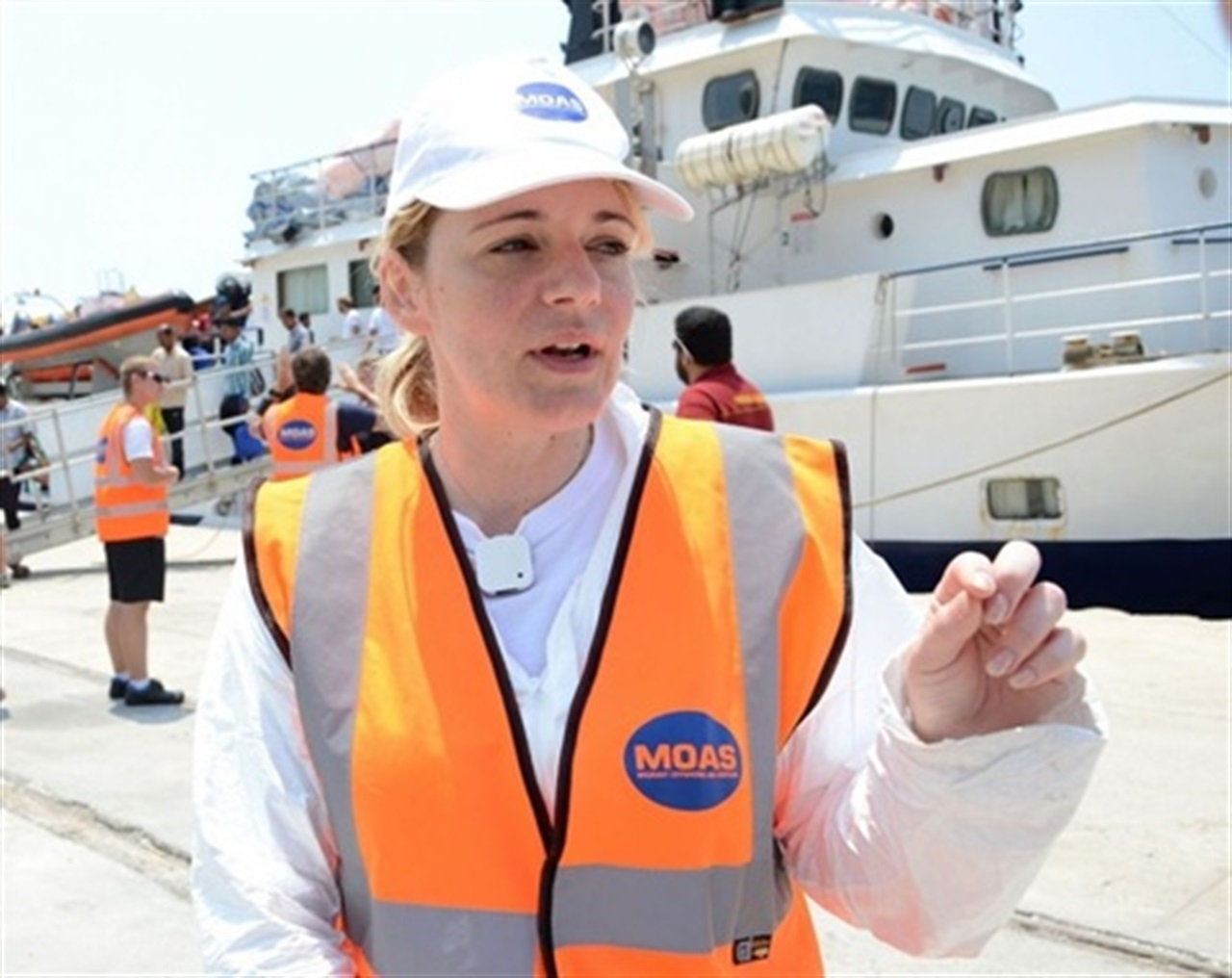

Regina Egle Liotta Catrambone is an Italian philanthropist and together with her husband Christopher Paul Catrambone, the co-founder of the Migrant Offshore Aid Station (MOAS), a non-governmental organisation specialising in search and rescue at sea. Since MOAS's inception over 40,000 people have been rescued during MOAS’ SAR missions running between 2014 and 2017 in the Central Mediterranean and the Aegean Sea. In 2015 Regina was awarded the “Ordine al Merito della Repubblica Italiana” by Sergio Mattarella and the “National Order of Merit” by Maria Louise Coleiro Preca for services rendered by MOAS in the location, rescue, and assistance of migrants in the Mediterranean Sea.

== Personal life and career ==
Catrambone was born in Reggio Calabria, Italy, and was living there when she met her future husband, American entrepreneur Christopher Catrambone, in 2006. The two were married in 2010, and live in Malta with their daughter, Maria Luisa. Catrambone and her husband worked together to build the insurance firm Tangiers Group, which specialises in insuring people working in conflict areas.

== Migrant aid work ==
While on a yacht cruise near Lampedusa in July 2013, the Catrambones encountered a floating life-jacket which had been abandoned by a migrant, and began to realise the scale and magnitude of the humanitarian crisis unfolding within the Mediterranean sea. This was followed by a statement from Pope Francis urging business entrepreneurs to provide more assistance. This spurred the Catrambone family to form the Migrant Offshore Aid Station (MOAS), a privately run search and rescue operation working to save lives among migrants trying to cross to Europe. Chris and Regina Catrambone purchased a trawler, the ‘MV Phoenix’, under the auspices of Tangiers Group, and invested a further $2.3 million US dollars of their own money before beginning operations in August 2014. Over 40,000 people were rescued during MOAS’ SAR missions running between 2014 and 2017 in the Central Mediterranean and the Aegean Sea. As Director of MOAS, Regina together with her team have also assisted an estimated 90,000 Rohingya refugees and members of the local population residing in Bangladeshi refugee camps through projects in the region. This has been achieved though the design and delivery of training courses and equipment for flooding and fire prevention and rescue to more than 8000 volunteers respectively. MOAS also coordinates the delivery of life-saving therapeutic foods and medicines against malnutrition to children in Yemen and Somalia as well as the provision of paramedical services to those injured by the violence of the conflict in Ukraine through Mobile Medical Teams, ambulances and Mobile Medical Units.

== Awards ==
Awards Won as an Individual

- Ordine al Merito della Repubblica Italiana (2015) "For the contribution that through the NGO MOAS - Migrant Offshore Aid Station offers in the location and assistance of migrants in difficulty in the Mediterranean Sea".

- Premio Mamma Lucia ‘Donne Coraggio’ (2015) dedicated to women who have engaged in national or international solidarity actions.

- San Giorgio d’oro (2016) “for the creation of the first private organization that helps migrants in the Mediterranean”.

-Trofeo del Mare (2017) “For the contribution in the assistance of migrants”.

- Tessera Preziosa Mosaico di Palermo (2018) awarded by the Major of Palermo Leoluca Orlando.

Awards Won With Her Husband Christopher Paul Catrambone

- Global Citizen Forum Award 2015 “for the generous initiative founded by the wealthy Catrambone family focused on saving refugee lives”.

- 100 Global Thinkers of 2015 -Foreign Policy Award “They have demonstrated extraordinary innovation, passion, creativity, and thirst, and have translated their ideas into action, impacting millions worldwide”.

- Premio internazionale della bontà 2015

Awards Won With MOAS

- Medal of the Republic of Malta 2015 awarded to “Maltese citizens for distinguished service to their country”.

- Peter Serracino Inglott Award for Civic Engagement 2015 awarded to “outstanding contributions by organisations and individuals who have distinguished themselves in civic thinking and engagement in a Maltese context”.

-Geuzen Medal 2016 – Geuzenpenning Foundation awarded by Queen Maxima d’Olanda “as a tribute to people and organisations working for human rights and who oppose dictatorship, discrimination and racism”.

- Special 112 Award by the European Emergency Number Association (EENA) 2016 for “outstanding individuals and organisations mainly engaged in improving public safety across Europe”.

- New European of the Year 2016.

- Atlantic Council Freedom Award (2017) for “extraordinary individuals and organizations that defend and advance the cause of freedom around the world, with a view to strengthening transatlantic leadership on global values”.

- Hero Award 2017 (International Maritime Rescue Federation, Category Team) for “Outstanding Team Contribution to a Maritime SAR Operation”.
