= Giovanni Di Cristina =

Italian pediatrician (1875–1928)

Giovanni Di Cristina (12 September 1875 - 27 February 1928) was an Italian pediatrician in Palermo.

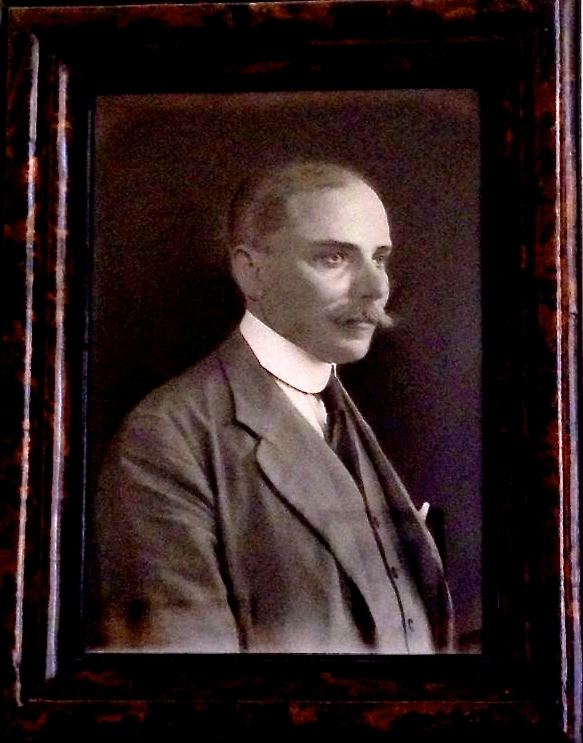
Giovanni Di Cristina's portrait, located inside the Ospedale dei Bambini of Palermo.

== Biography ==
In 1902 he graduated in medicine and surgery. Since he was a student he devoted himself to the study of general pathology deepening into the field of bacteriology. After graduation he made study trips abroad and lived in qualified research centers of German universities, including Munich, Berlin and Würzburg for training periods and to improve his knowledge. In 1909 he returned to his hometown where, under the leadership of Professor Rocco Jemma, chose to address the specialized area of pediatrics. In 1913, when Professor Jemma moved to the clinic in Naples, Di Cristina took over the chair of the pediatric clinic in Palermo During those years, his interest was immediately drawn to the very heart of the problem of leishmaniasis children that led him to discover both a cure which was made up of salts of antimony and a method used worldwide which, since then, allowed to win this otherwise deadly infectious disease. His scientific production is extensive in many areas of research. He studied several types of hemopathy and gave contributions to the knowledge of pseudo-leukemia, of lymphogranulomatosis and of chloroma. He was involved in the production disorders and in the nitrogen replacement in some diseases of childhood. Beyond the clinical and scientific aspects Di Cristina strictly linked his name to many initiatives on infancy. Due to his commitments the Istituto dell’aiuto materno and the Casa del sole "Ignazio and Manfredi Lanza di Trabia" were founded. He prematurely died at the age of 52 in Palermo.

== Bibliography ==
- Various Authors, Ospedale dei Bambini "Giovanni Di Cristina" di Palermo - 130° Anniversario della Fondazione, Fondazione Ospedale dei Bambini Palermo, Palermo 2012, pp. 94
- Giuseppe Armocida, "Giovanni Di Cristina", in Dizionario Biografico degli Italiani, Vol.39 (1991)
- Italo Farnetani, Francesca Farnetani, La top twelve della ricerca italiana, « Minerva Pediatrica» 2015; 67 (5): pp. 437–450 .
- Italo Farnetani, Qualche notazione di storia della pediatria, in margine alla V edizione di Pediatria Essenziale, Postfazione. In Burgio G.R.( (a cura di). Pediatria Essenziale. 5a Ed. Milano: Edi-Ermes; 2012. ISBN 9788870512250. vol. 2°, pp. 1757–1764.
