= Soveria Mannelli =

Soveria Mannelli Suverìa Mannielli
- Comune
- Comune di Soveria Mannelli
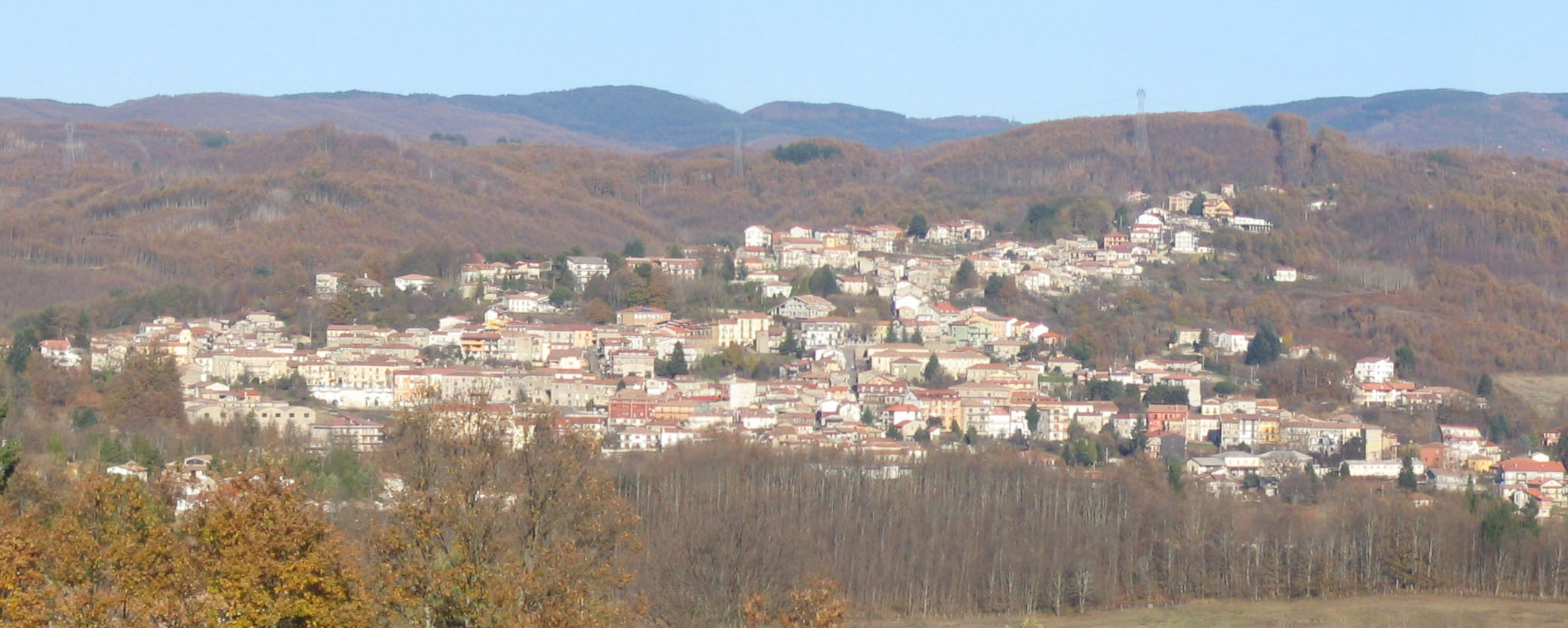

- Location within Italy Location within Calabria
- Coordinates: 39°5′N 16°22′E
- Country: Italy
- Region: Calabria
- Province: Catanzaro (CZ)
- Frazioni: Colla, Pirillo, San Tommaso

Government
  - Mayor: Michele Chiodo

Area
  - Total: 20 km^{2} (7.7 sq mi)
- Elevation: 774 m (2,539 ft)

Population (31 October 2018)
  - Total: 3,007
  - Density: 150/km^{2} (390/sq mi)
- Demonym: Soveritani
- Time zone: UTC+1 (CET)
  - Summer (DST): UTC+2 (CEST)
- Postal code: 88049
- Dialing code: 0968
- Patron saint: St. John the Baptist
- Saint day: 24 June
- Website: Official website

Soveria Mannelli (Sicilian: Suverìa Mannielli) is a town and comune in the province of Catanzaro, in the Calabria region of southern Italy.

The town is bordered by Bianchi, Carlopoli, Colosimi, Decollatura, Gimigliano, Pedivigliano.

== History ==
On 30 August 1860, a Sicilian army under General Ghio was disbanded in Soveria Mannelli. This, in the course of the Expedition of the Thousand, allowed Giuseppe Garibaldi to capture Naples eight days later.

== People ==
- Rosario Rubbettino (1941–2000), publisher, was born in the town.
- Alfredo Costanzo (born 1943), Australian racing driver, was born in the town.

== Sources ==
- Mario Felice Marasco, Soveria Mannelli e il suo territorio, Notizie e dati tratti dagli appunti di Ivone Sirianni, San Vito al Tagliamento: Tipografia Sanvitese Ellerani, 1969
- Mario Gallo, Soveria Mannelli, Saggi e documentazione storica, Cosenza: Due Emme, 1991
