= Vincenzo Aquilanti =

Italian chemist, emeritus professor (born 1939)

- Born: Vincenzo Aquilanti; December 12, 1939 (age 86); Rome, Italy
- Education: Sapienza University of Rome
- Known for: Molecular dynamics
- Scientific career
- Fields: Chemistry
- Workplaces: University of Perugia; Federal University of Bahia; National Research Council (Italy)
- Doctoral advisor: Vincenzo Caglioti

Vincenzo Aquilanti (born December 12, 1939) is an Italian chemist, emeritus professor at the University of Perugia.

== Career ==
He graduated in chemistry with Vincenzo Caglioti and Giangualberto Volpi at Sapienza University of Rome in 1963, where he started his career as a scientist. In 1967–1968, he worked in Dudley Herschbach's group at Harvard University. At the University of Perugia from 1968, he became a full professor of general and inorganic chemistry in 1980. He has been an emeritus professor at the Università degli Studi di Perugia since 2010. He was an invited professor at the Federal University of Bahia from 2012 to 2016. Currently, he is associated with the Matter Structure Institute of the National Research Council

== Research ==
His scientific activity, documented by more than 430 papers (h-index 50), concerns experimental and theoretical aspects in the fields of radiation chemistry, of the ionic reactions in the gas phase, of elastic, inelastic, and reactive collisions between atoms and simple molecules of atmospheric and astrophysical interest, and of quantum and semi-classical physical chemistry.

His experimental activity began in Rome in the 1960s with the study of the role of the reactions involving ions in radiation chemistry and the mechanisms of ion-molecule reactions. The construction in Perugia in the 1970s of an original experimental apparatus, where coupling the technique of crossed atomic and molecular beams with spectroscopic emission detection, led to the discovery of the phenomena of polarization and interference in atomic and molecular collisions. A variant of such an apparatus is still operating in Barcelona. In the 1980s, through an original technique of magnetic analysis of type Stern-Gerlach for the orbital states of polarization of spin and electronic angular momentum of atoms, such as halogens (fluorine and chlorine), oxygen, and sulphur, he obtained an ample phenomenology on the interactions of these species by molecular-beams scattering. These interactions provide remarkable information on the initial phases of chemical reactions, that involve long-range forces determined by their open shell structure. Since the 1990s, following the discovery of the effects of rotational alignment in molecules in supersonic expansions, he has established a technology for the study of collisions of aligned molecules, obtaining the characterization of intermolecular forces and their anisotropy. In recent years, he has been developing, in laboratories at the University of Perugia, Elettra Sincrotrone Trieste, the National Taiwan University in Taipei and Osaka University, experimental instrumentations for the study of the collisional origin of molecular chirality.

The theoretical activity is being developed in parallel to the experimental one, a fundamental theme being the quantum treatment of phenomena such as those observed in the study of elementary chemical processes, where the motion of nuclei enters into play: their behaviour is at the borderline of classical mechanics (semi-classical regime). On this theme (quantum mechanics in the short-wave limit), he has studied non-adiabatic processes, the role of singularities (catastrophes), the chaotic regime, and has also contributed to the historical–epistemological debate. His major theoretical effort has concerned the formulation and implementation of the treatment of the dynamics of processes involving few bodies, that encounter as a quantum mechanical principal obstacle the necessity to explicitly treat the coupling of angular momenta and spin, with electronic, rotational, and orbital momenta. He has contributed in this area to the introduction of hyperspherical coordinates and harmonics, developing analytical tools and original algorithms. He has also focused on the study of the deviations from the Arrhenius law.

== Academies and memberships ==
- 1985–91 – Italian Chemical Society (President, Section Umbria, 1985–1991)
- 1995–98 – European Physical Society (deputy-chair, Atomic and Molecular Physics Division
- 2005–10 – INTAS Council of Scientists, Bruxelles.
- Italian Physical Society.
- Italian Society of Logic and Philosophy of Science.

== Awards and honors ==
In 2005, he was elected to the Accademia Nazionale delle Scienze detta dei XL and in 2009 to the Accademia Nazionale dei Lincei.

In 2009, a special issue of the Journal of Physical Chemistry was dedicated to him by the American Chemical Society. He was awarded the 2014 R.B. Bernstein Medal in Stereodynamics.

== Publications ==
- Aquilanti, V.; Grossi, G.; Laganà, A. (1982). "On hyperspherical mapping and harmonic expansions for potential energy surfaces". J. Chem. Phys. 76 (3): 1587–88. Bibcode:1982JChPh..76.1587A. doi:10.1063/1.443121.
- Aquilanti, V.; Ascenzi, D.; Cappelletti, D.; Pirani, F. (1994). "Velocity dependence of collisional alignment of oxygen molecules in gaseous expansions". Nature. 371 (6496): 399–402. Bibcode:1994Natur.371..399A. doi:10.1038/371399a0. S2CID 4335198.
- Aquilanti, V.; Ascenzi, D.; Bartolomei, M.; Cappelletti, D.; Cavalli, S.; de Castro Vitores, M.; Pirani, F. (1999). "Quantum interference scattering of aligned molecules: Bonding in O4 and Role of Spin Coupling" (PDF). Phys. Rev. Lett. 82 (1): 69–72. Bibcode:1999PhRvL..82...69A. doi:10.1103/PhysRevLett.82.69. hdl:10261/100467.
- Aquilanti, V.; Ascenzi, D.; Bartolomei, M.; Cappelletti, D.; Cavalli, S.; de Castro Vitores, M.; Pirani, F. (1999). "Molecular beam scattering of aligned oxygen molecules. The nature of the Bond in the O2−O2 Dimer". J. Am. Chem. Soc. 121 (46): 10794–802. doi:10.1021/ja9917215. hdl:10261/100013.
- Aquilanti, V.; Cornicchi, E.; Teixidor, M. M.; Saendig, N.; Pirani, F.; Cappelletti, D. (2005). "Glory scattering measurement of water−noble-gas interactions: the birth of the hydrogen bond". Angew. Chem. Int. Ed. 44 (16): 2356–59. doi:10.1002/anie.200462704. PMID 15806609.; Angew. Chem. 117, 2408–12 (2005).
