= Giuseppe Lo Schiavo =

- Portrait of Giuseppe Lo Schiavo 2013
- Born: 1986 (age 39–40); Pizzo Calabro
- Known for: Photography, Visual Art

Giuseppe Lo Schiavo, also known as GLOS, is an Italian-born visual artist and researcher based in London.

Lo Schiavo is an artist who combines technology, science, and popular culture in his art, using mediums such as video, photography, installation, AI, microorganisms and more. He draws inspiration from the past and reinterprets it through a digital lens, resulting in a unique fusion of old and new.

== Biography ==
Giuseppe Lo Schiavo was born in Vibo Valentia, in the south of Italy. He has studied architecture at the Sapienza University of Rome.

Lo Schiavo is the winner of the 2024 Premio Cairo, the most prestigious award for emerging contemporary artists in Italy.

In 2023, Domus, a renowned publication, has described Giuseppe Lo Schiavo as "a prototype of the modern-day artist."

Lo Schiavo introduced the term 'simulated photography' in September 2023 in an interview published by the Amsterdam-based newspaper Het Parool. This pioneering concept challenges traditional photography by embracing new methods of image creation, opening up exciting possibilities for a novel art form. 'Simulated photography' represents a novel approach to image creation that transcends conventional camera-based methods, paving the way for a transformative new art form.

In February 2023 Lo Schiavo presented at CAFA Museum in Beijing the work Nike which is the largest resolution CGI artwork to date, with a resolution of 80.000 x 80.000 pixels showcasing Lo Schiavo's pioneering approach to pushing the boundaries of digital art.

In 2022 Lo Schiavo signed the creative direction of the first published book illustrated by the AI tool Midjourney, authored by Paolo Stella and published by De Agostini.

Giuseppe Lo Schiavo was the first winner of the European project BioArt Challenge organised by the Museum of Science MUSE with the support of Cardiff University, Zurich University of Applied Science, the University of Trento and the Museum of Science MUSE.

In 2020 Giuseppe Lo Schiavo was the first artist to be invited for an artist in residence program in the microbiology lab of University College London UCL in London.

Glos started his career as an artist in 2011 with his series Levitation that was published and exhibited internationally. His recent artistic research focuses on exploring human civilization, sociology and biology.

He currently lives and works between Milan and London.

== Awards and exhibitions ==
Lo Schiavo is the winner of 2024 Premio Cairo the most important award for emerging artists in contemporary art in Italy.

In 2021 Lo Schiavo is the winner of the European project BioArt Challenge organised by the Museum of Science MUSE.

In 2020 Lo Schiavo was offered a one-year artist residence program at the university UCL in London in the Microbiology lab of the medical school.

In 2019 Lo Schiavo was a tutor of History of Art at the Marangoni Institute in London that is part of Manchester Metropolitan University.

In June 2015, Giuseppe Lo Schiavo was one of the youngest artists of the group exhibition Il blu nell'arte, da Yves Klein a Jan Fabre. presented at MACA museum in Acri, Cosenza where is work "narcissus" was exhibited together with artists such as Lucio Fontana, Yves Klein, Jan Fabre, Victor Vasarely, Mimmo Rotella, Mimmo Rotella, Raymond Hains, curated by Francesco Poli

In April 2014 Lo Schiavo's gif 'Anamorphic Triangle' was presented at Saatchi Gallery in occasion of the Saatchi Gallery and Google Plus Motion Photography Prize

Lo Schiavo's works were selected for the Portrait Salon 2013 that was presented in the UK and was featured on the BBC.

In November 2013 he won the jury award on the Bonato Minella Awards in Turin, Italy. The award was conferred to Lo Schiavo by Vittorio Sgarbi.

The works of Lo Schiavo have been featured in international magazine, radio and presented in various exhibitions of museums and art galleries in all over the world such as Saatchi Gallery in London, Aperture Foundation in New York, Museo Arte Contemporanea Acri in Cosenza, in Istanbul and in other galleries in Rome, Turin and Munich.
