= Aquilanti–Mundim deformed Arrhenius model =

Chemical kinetics model

In chemical kinetics, the Aquilanti–Mundim deformed Arrhenius model is a generalization of the standard Arrhenius law.

== Overview ==
Arrhenius plots, which are used to represent the effects of temperature on the rates of chemical and biophysical processes and on various transport phenomena in materials science, may exhibit deviations from linearity. Account of curvature is provided here by a formula, which involves a deformation of the exponential function, of the kind recently encountered in treatments of non-extensivity in statistical mechanics.

== Theoretical model ==
Svante Arrhenius (1889) equation is often used to characterize the effect of temperature on the rates of chemical reactions. The Arrhenius formula gave a simple and powerful law, which in a vast generality of cases describes the dependence on absolute temperature $T$ of the rate constant as following,

$k(T)=Ae^{-E_{o}/RT} \qquad \qquad \qquad$ (1)

where $T$ is the absolute temperature, $R$ is the gas constant and the factor $A$ varies only slightly with temperature. The meaning attached to the energy of activation $E_o$ is as the minimum energy, which molecules need have to overcome the threshold to reaction. Therefore, the year 1889 can be considered as the birth date of reactive dynamics as the study of the motion of atoms and molecules in a reactive event. Eq. (1) was motivated by the 1884 discovery by van't Hoff of the exponential dependence from the temperature of the equilibrium constants for most reactions: Eq.(1), when used for both a reaction and its inverse, agrees with van't Hoff's equation interpreting chemical equilibrium as dynamical at the microscopic level. In case of a single rate-limited thermally activated process, an Arrhenius plot gives a straight line, from which the activation energy and the pre-exponential factor can both be determined.

However, advances in experimental and theoretical methods have revealed the existence of deviation from Arrhenius behavior (Fig.1).

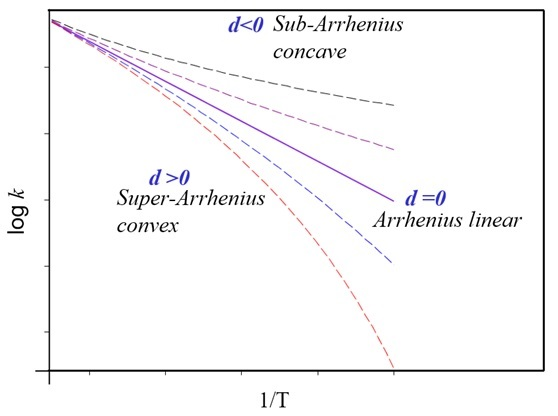
Fig.1 Arrhenius plot as a function of $d$ parameter. The Arrhenius plot concavity is depending on the value of the $d$ parameter.

To overcome this problem, Aquilanti and Mundim proposed (2010) a generalized Arrhenius law based on algebraic deformation of the usual exponential function. Starting from the Euler exponential definition given by,

  
    
      
        
          e
          
            x
          
        
        =
        
          lim
          
            n
            →
            +
            ∞
          
        
        (
        1
        +
        
          
            x
            n
          
        
        
          )
          
            n
          
        
        
        
        
        
        
      
    
    {\displaystyle e^{x}=\lim _{n\to +\infty }(1+{\frac {x}{n}})^{n}\qquad \qquad \qquad \qquad \qquad }
  
                (2)

defining the deformed exponential function as,

  
    
      
        
          e
          
            d
          
          
            x
          
        
        ≡
        
          
            (
            
              1
              +
              d
              x
            
            )
          
          
            1
            
              /
            
            d
          
        
        
        
        
      
    
    {\displaystyle e_{d}^{x}\equiv \left(1+dx\right)^{1/d}\qquad \qquad \qquad }
  
                             (3)

Identifying the deformation parameter $d$ as a continuous generalization of $\frac{1}{n}$ . At the limit $d\rightarrow 0$ the d-exponential function, $e^{x}_{d}$, coincides with the usual exponential according to the well-known limit due to Euler, that is,

  
    
      
        
          lim
          
            d
            →
            0
          
        
        
          
            e
            
              d
            
            
              x
            
          
        
        =
        
          e
          
            x
          
        
        
        
        
      
    
    {\displaystyle \lim _{d\to 0}{e_{d}^{x}}=e^{x}\qquad \qquad \qquad }
  
                                  (4)

This definition was first used in thermodynamics and statistical mechanics by Landau. In the most recent scientific literature, there is a variety of deformed algebras with applications in different areas of science. Considering the d-exponential function, we introduce the deformed reaction rate coefficient, $k_{d}(T)$, in the following way,

  
  
    
      
        
          k
          
            d
          
        
        (
        T
        )
        =
        A
        
          e
          
            d
          
          
            −
            
              
                
                  E
                  
                    o
                  
                
                
                  R
                  T
                
              
            
          
        
        =
        A
        
          
            (
            
              1
              −
              d
              
                
                  
                    E
                    
                      o
                    
                  
                  
                    R
                    T
                  
                
              
            
            )
          
          
            1
            
              /
            
            d
          
        
      
    
    {\displaystyle k_{d}(T)=Ae_{d}^{-{\frac {E_{o}}{RT}}}=A\left(1-d{\frac {E_{o}}{RT}}\right)^{1/d}}
  
                     (5)

Fig.1a Aquilanti-Mundim plot as a function of $d$ parameter. At the limit $d\rightarrow 0$ the usual Arrhenius Plot is recovered. At $d=0$ is Usual Arrhenius, $d<0$ is concave and at $d>0$ convex plot.

and at the limit $d\rightarrow 0$ the usual Arrhenius reaction law is recovered (Figs.1 and 1a). $A$ is pre-exponential factor. Taking the logarithm of $k_{d}(T)$, Eq.(5), we obtain the following expression for the non-Arrhenius plot,

  
    
      
        ln
        ⁡
        
          k
          
            d
          
        
        (
        T
        )
        =
        ln
        ⁡
        
          A
        
        +
        
          
            1
            d
          
        
        ln
        ⁡
        
          (
          
            1
            −
            d
            
              
                
                  E
                  
                    o
                  
                
                
                  R
                  T
                
              
            
          
          )
        
      
    
    {\displaystyle \ln k_{d}(T)=\ln {A}+{\frac {1}{d}}\ln \left(1-d{\frac {E_{o}}{RT}}\right)}
  
                      (6)

The logarithm of the reaction rate coefficient against reciprocal temperature shows a curvature, rather than the straight-line behavior described by the usual Arrhenius law (Figs.1 and 1a).

In Tolman's definition the barrier or activation energy is a phenomenological quantity defined in terms of the slope of an Arrhenius law; it is usually assumed to be independent of absolute temperature (T), requires only local equilibrium and in general is given by

  
    
      
        
          E
          
            o
          
        
        =
        −
        
          
            
              ∂
              l
              n
              k
              (
              T
              )
            
            
              ∂
              (
              
                
                  1
                  
                    R
                    T
                  
                
              
              )
            
          
        
      
    
    {\displaystyle E_{o}=-{\frac {\partial lnk(T)}{\partial ({\frac {1}{RT}})}}}
  
                                     (7)

where $E_{o}$ is constant and $R$ is the ideal gas constant. To generalize Tolman´s definition, in the case chemical reactions, we assume that the barrier or activation energy is a function of the temperature given by the following differential equation,

  
    
      
        
          E
          
            a
          
        
        =
        −
        
          
            
              ∂
              l
              n
              
                k
                
                  d
                
              
              (
              T
              )
            
            
              ∂
              (
              
                
                  1
                  
                    R
                    T
                  
                
              
              )
            
          
        
        =
        
          E
          
            o
          
        
        
          
            (
            
              1
              −
              d
              
                
                  
                    E
                    
                      o
                    
                  
                  
                    R
                    T
                  
                
              
            
            )
          
          
            −
            1
          
        
        
        
        
      
    
    {\displaystyle E_{a}=-{\frac {\partial lnk_{d}(T)}{\partial ({\frac {1}{RT}})}}=E_{o}\left(1-d{\frac {E_{o}}{RT}}\right)^{-1}\qquad \qquad \qquad }
  
 or 
  
    
      
        
          
            1
            
              E
              
                a
              
            
          
        
        =
        
          
            1
            
              E
              
                0
              
            
          
        
        −
        
          
            d
            
              R
              T
            
          
        
      
    
    {\displaystyle {\frac {1}{E_{a}}}={\frac {1}{E_{0}}}-{\frac {d}{RT}}}
  
  →  
  
    
      
        γ
        (
        T
        )
        =
        
          γ
          
            o
          
        
        −
        d
        β
      
    
    {\displaystyle \gamma (T)=\gamma _{o}-d\beta }
  
   (8)

where $E_{a}=E_{o}$ (constant) at limit $d\rightarrow 0$ and the usual activation energy law is recovered as a constant. Noticeably, on the contrary of the usual Arrhenius case, the barrier or activation energy is temperature dependent and $k_{d}(T)$ has different concavities depending on the value of the d parameter (see Figs.1 and 1a). Thus, a positive convexity means that $E_{a}$ decreases with increasing temperature. This general result is explained by a new Tolman-like interpretation of the activation energy through Eq.(8).

In the recent literature, it is possible to find different applications to verify the applicability of this new chemical reaction formalism

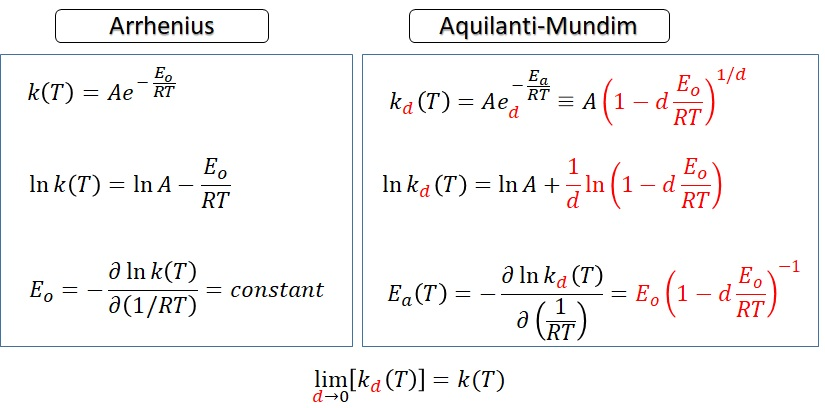
Fig.2 – Reaction rate coefficient and activation energy equations, in both theories.

== Apparent Reciprocal Activation Energy or Transitivity ==
$E_{a}$ can be considered as temperature dependent. It was postulated as the basic expansion the reciprocal-activation reciprocal-temperature relationship, for which can provide a formal mathematical justification by Tolman Theorem. The $E_{a}(T)$ function when written as the logarithmic derivative of the rate constants with respect to $\beta=\frac{1}{RT}$, Eq. (7), the concept to an activation energy represents an energetic obstacle to the progress of the reaction: therefore its reciprocal can be interpreted as a measure of the propensity for the reaction to proceed and defined as the specific transitivity ($\gamma$) of the process:

  
    
      
        γ
        (
        β
        )
        =
        
          
            1
            
              
                E
                
                  a
                
              
              (
              T
              )
            
          
        
      
    
    {\displaystyle \gamma (\beta )={\frac {1}{E_{a}(T)}}}
  
     (9)

This notation emphasizes the fact that in general the transitivity can take a gamma of values, but not including abrupt changes e.g. in the mechanism or in the phases of reactants. If it is admit a Laurent expansion in a neighbourhood around a reference value, it is possible recover the Eqs. (6) and (8).

What it is call the sub-Arrhenius behaviour would be accounted for traditionally by introducing a tunnelling parameter ($\kappa$) in the conventional Transition-State-Theory. In the $d$-TST formulation, it is replace the factor $\kappa.\exp(-E_o\beta)$ in the TST rate constant by the deformed exponential function, Eq. (3), yielding:

  
    
      
        
          k
          
            d
            −
            T
            S
            T
          
        
        =
        
          
            
              
                k
                
                  B
                
              
              T
            
            h
          
        
        
          
            
              Q
              
                ‡
              
            
            
              Q
              
                r
              
            
          
        
        (
        1
        −
        d
        
          E
          
            o
          
        
        β
        
          )
          
            1
            
              /
            
            d
          
        
      
    
    {\displaystyle k_{d-TST}={\frac {k_{B}T}{h}}{\frac {Q^{\ddagger }}{Q_{r}}}(1-dE_{o}\beta )^{1/d}}
  
     (10)

where $h$ is Planck constant, $k_B$ is Boltzmann constant and $Q_r$ is the (translational, vibrational and rotational) partition functions of the reactants, and $Q^\ddagger$ is the partition function of the activated complex. In Ref., the significance of the parameter $d$ and an explicit procedure for its calculation were proposed, which it is inversely proportional to the square of the barrier height ($E_o$)and directly proportional to the square of the frequency for crossing the barrier ($\nu^\ddagger$) at a saddle point in the potential energy surface:

  
    
      
        d
        =
        −
        
          
            1
            3
          
        
        
          
            (
            
              
                
                  h
                  
                    ν
                    
                      ‡
                    
                  
                
                
                  2
                  
                    E
                    
                      o
                    
                  
                
              
            
            )
          
          
            2
          
        
      
    
    {\displaystyle d=-{\frac {1}{3}}\left({\frac {h\nu ^{\ddagger }}{2E_{o}}}\right)^{2}}
  
     (11)

== Fields of Applications and Related Subjects ==
This theory was initially developed for applications in chemical kinetics problems as above discussed, but has since been applied to a wide range of phenomena:

- the characterization of reaction rates in Chemistry,
- Transition state theory (TST),
- Astrochemical process,
- quantum tunneling,
- stereodynamics stereochemistry of kinetics processes, solid-state diffusive reactions,
- physical processes in supercooled liquids,
- carbon nanotubes composite,
- transport phenomena,
- anomalous diffusion,
- Brownian particles moving,
- transport dynamics in ionic conductors,
- a continuum approach for modeling gravitational effects on grain settling and shape distortion,
- collision theory,
- rate theory connecting kinetics to thermodynamics,
- nonextensive statistical mechanics,
- different fields of plasma chemical-physics,
- modelling of high-temperature dark current in multi-quantum well structures from MWIR to VLWI,
- molecular semiconductor problems,
- Metallurgy: perspectives on lubricant additive corrosion,
- Langevin stochastic dynamics,
- predicting solubility of solids in supercritical solvents,
- survey on operational perishables (food) quality control and logistics,
- activation energy's on biodiesel reaction,
- flux over population analysis,
- molecular quantum mechanics,
- biological activity,
- drug design,
- protein folding.
- Motor proteins,
- Microbial growth laws,
- Water dynamics
- Classroom on Motivation and Sociability
- Virial coefficients in chemical reaction
- Diffusion in a binary colloidal mixture
- Claisen–Schmidt condensation
- Thermotherapy
- Landscape topography
- 3D-printed powder components
- Glass alloy
- Li-ion Batteries
