= Baldassarre Squitti =

Italian politician

Baron Baldassarre Squitti (3 August 1858 in Maida – 4 December 1929 in Rome) was an Italian politician.

Baldassarre was the brother of Senator Nicola Squitti and Eleonora Maria Squitti, lady-in-waiting to Queen Margherita of Savoy, children of Tommaso Squitti, Baron of Palermiti and Guarna, and Rosina Astanti.

He was Professor of Roman Law and Criminal procedure at the Sapienza University of Rome, also teaching Roman Law at Naples for a few months before returning to Rome.

Baldassarre was elected Member of Parliament for the Region of Monteleone Calabro (now Vibo Valentia) from 1904 to 1913, serving under Prime Minister Giovanni Giolitti.

He was a member of the Accademia Nazionale delle Scienze detta dei XL, Italy's national academy of science.

He was also a writer, and his works include the translation of 'Institute of Roman Civil Law' by German writer Eduard Böcking - (Naples, 1885).
