= Carlo Musitano =

Italian physician and Catholic priest

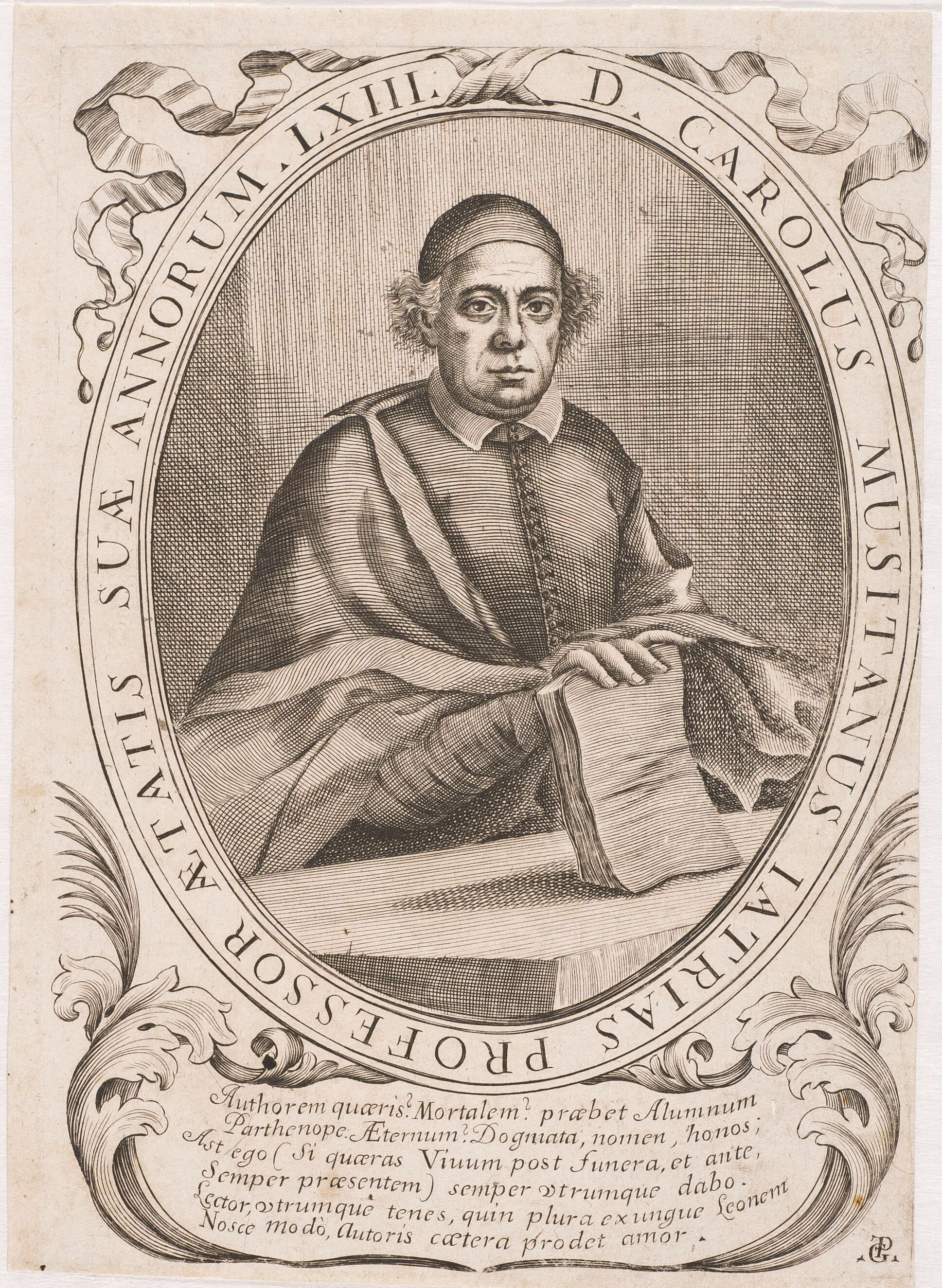
- Carlo Musitano
- Born: January 5, 1635; Castrovillari, Kingdom of Naples
- Died: 1714 (aged 78–79); Naples, Kingdom of Naples
- Citizenship: Neapolitan
- Parent(s): Scipione Musitano and Laura Musitano (née Pugliese)
- Scientific career
- Fields: Medicine; Surgery
- Academic advisors: Tommaso Cornelio; Leonardo da Capua; Sebastiano Bartoli

Ecclesiastical career
- Religion: Christianity
- Church: Catholic Church
- Ordained: 1658

Carlo Musitano (5 January 1635 – 1714) was an Italian Catholic priest and physician often known by his Latin name Musitanus. He was one of the most important Italian physicians of the seventeenth century and his works were reissued several times and translated into French and German.

== Biography ==
Carlo Musitano was born at Castrovillari, in Calabria, on January 5, 1635. He graduated in theology and philosophy, and was ordained a priest in 1658. He then settled in Naples, where he studied medicine under the guidance of renowned masters such as Tommaso Cornelio, Leonardo da Capua and Sebastiano Bartoli and acquired considerable reputation as a physician. Musitano also practised surgery. His treatise on the theory and practice of surgery appeared in 1698.

As a physician he paid special attention to gynaecology and venereal diseases. One of his most important works was a treatise on women's diseases: "De morbis mulierum tractatus". This particular activity of the Priest-Physician made him many enemies who, under the pretext of "indecency", tried to prevent him from practicing medicine. However they did not succeed, for Pope Clement IX, who recognized his worth, allowed him to practice, and Cardinal Antonio Pignatelli, Archbishop of Naples, who later became Pope Innocent XII, also decreed that Musitano was entitled to administer the confessional rites. Thus supported, Musitano went on and did much good, both as a confessor and a physician. He attended rich and poor with equal assiduity, and refused all fees and presents.

A defender of the new experimental approach to medicine, in 1700, he became involved in a quarrel with the Galenic doctor Pietro Antonio de Martino. Musitano was a prolific writer and was appointed a member of several scientific academies, including the Investiganti of Naples and the Spensierati of Rossano. He died in Naples in 1714, aged 79.

== Works ==
His works on medicine and surgery were published in two volumes folio, after his death. Musitano was a follower of the iatrochemical school and an outspoken enemy of Galenism. He was a proponent of the experimental method and condemned the use of bloodletting, leeches and baths. Musitano played a major role in the discovery of the parasitic origin of scabies and was among the first to say that the itch mite was found at the end of the burrow and not in vesicular lesions (Giovanni Cosimo Bonomo had erroneously claimed that the mite was within the blisters of the eruption). Musitano was the author of many treatises on medicine and related subjects, among which may be mentioned the following:

- Pyrotechnia sophica rerum naturalium, Naples, 1683
- Pyretologia sive Tractatus de febribus, Naples, 1683.
- Trutina medica antiquarum ac recentiorum disquisitionum gravioribus de morbis habitarum, Venice, 1688.
- De lue venerea libri quatuor, Naples, 1689. A French translation of the work appeared in 1711.
- Chirurgia teoretico-practica seu Trutina chirurgico-physica, Geneva and Lyon. 1698.
- Apologia celeberrimorum Virorum, ibid. 1700.
- Opera medico chymico-practica seu Trutina medico-chymica, Geneva, 1700; translated into German and published in Frankfurt and Lipsia in 1702.
- Trutina Medico-Physica, Geneva, 1701.
- Ad Hadriani a Mynsicht thesaurum et armamentarium medico-chymicum Mantissa, Geneva, 1701.
- De morbis mulierum tractatus, Geneva, 1709.

His complete works were published at Geneva in 1716 and reissued in Lyon in 1733 and in Venice in 1738.

== Bibliography ==
- «D. Carlo Musitano». In : Elogi accademici della Società degli Spensierati di Rossano, In Napoli : a spese di Carlo Troise stampatore Accademico della medesima Società, 1703, pp. 99–110 (on-line).
- Éloy, Nicolas François Joseph (1778). "Musitan, Charles". Dictionnaire historique de la médicine ancienne et moderne. Vol. 3. pp. 363–364.
- Accattatis, Luigi (1869). Le biografie degli uomini illustri delle Calabrie. Vol. 2. Cosenza: dalla tipografia municipale. pp. 269–271.
- Friedman, Reuben (1938). "Carolus Musitanus. The 250th Anniversary of His Contribution to Scabies". Medical Life. 45: 177–187.
- Russo, Francesco (1948). "Musitano, Carlo". Enciclopedia Cattolica. Vol. 8. p. 1561.
- Pazzini, Adalberto (1954). "Carlo Musitano da Castrovillari and his work". Athena. 20 (5): 226–229. PMID 13189817.
- Arcieri, Giovanni Piero (1969). In difesa di un medico sacerdote calabrese del Seicento, Carlo Musitano, accusato di atti ipersensuali da medici partenopei. Philadelphia: Bichoff's Printing House.
- Renaldo, John J. (1979). "A Note on the History of Medicine and a Debate on Parnassus". Bulletin of the History of Medicine. 53 (4): 606–613. JSTOR 44450952. PMID 397845.
- Preti, Cesare (2012). "MUSITANO, Carlo". Dizionario Biografico degli Italiani (in Italian). Vol. 77: Morlini–Natolini. Rome: Istituto dell'Enciclopedia Italiana. ISBN 978-88-12-00032-6.
