= Michael Stimpson =

British composer (born 1948)

Michael John Stimpson (born 1948) is a British composer.

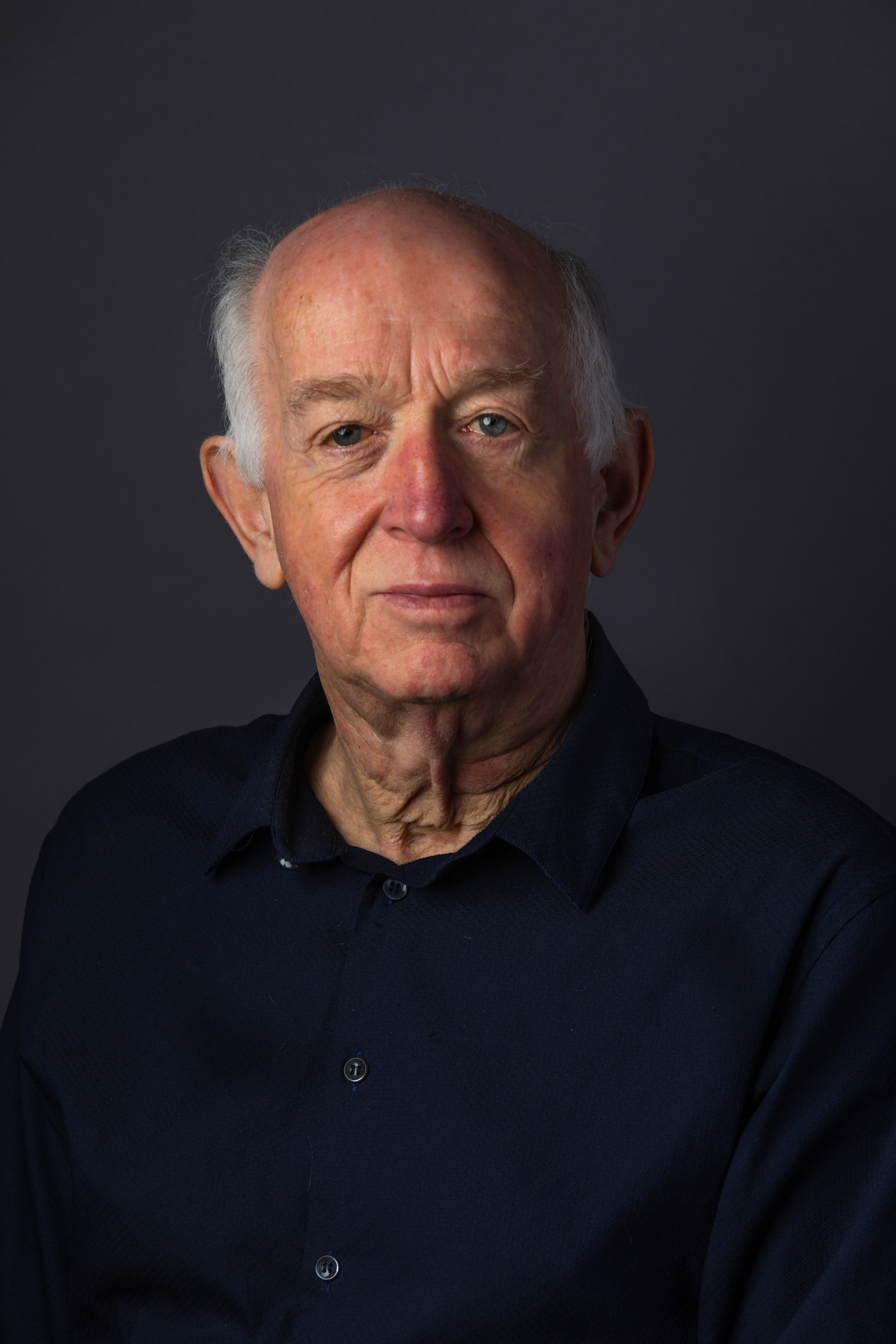

== Early life and education ==
Stimpson was brought up in Hammersmith and Wimbledon. His first degree was in Botany and Zoology, but immediately on completion he turned to music, and more specifically, the classical guitar. His twenties were taken up with study, examinations, concerts, and teaching, and his first contribution to a book.

In 1980 he studied on the Advanced Course at the Royal Academy of Music. He received his doctorate in composition at the University of Southampton in 1997. During this time he published Café Music for solo guitar (Ricordi) and edited a book and six-part music series with Oxford University Press which included collaborations with Queen guitarist Brian May and flamenco guitarist Paco Peña.

== Career ==
Stimpson's first major chamber work, Sonata for Piano Trio, was premiered at the Purcell Room by the Dussek Piano Trio in 1997, and was described by The Strad as '...a finely poised, lyrical work...a joy to hear'. String Quartet No. 1 (Robben Island), composed after the breakdown of apartheid, was premiered in October 2000 by the Allegri Quartet at St. John's Smith Square, London. The Allegri's commission, A Walk Into War, for tenor and piano quintet and based on the writings of Laurie Lee, was premiered at the Salisbury International Arts Festival in 2002.

Other major works include The Angry Garden (choir, soli, and orchestra, 2002), Clouds of War (choir, soli, and orchestra, 2005), and the four-stage Age of Wonders (violin and piano/string quartet/string orchestra/orchestra, 2009).

A personal connection with the Tuscan hilltop town of Barga has led to two Italian-themed works, the song cycle Dall'Alba Al Tramonto (2006) for tenor and piano, and L'Ora di Barga (2012) for soprano and piano.

Since completing his four-act opera Jesse Owens in 2011, Stimpson has concentrated on solo and chamber works, although Silvered Night (2019) for piano and orchestra marks a return to composing for larger forces.

There are seven CDs of Stimpson's works to date: Journeymen (Allegri Quartet, Paul Agnew and Daniel Tong, Riverrun Records); Dylan and The Drowning of Capel Celyn (Roderick Williams and Sioned Williams, Stone Records); Incidental Music and Songs from the opera Jesse Owens and Preludes In Our Time (Philharmonia Orchestra, conductor Stuart Stratford, Abigail Kelly, Jonny Herford, Megumi Fujita, Stone Records); Age of Wonders (Philharmonia Orchestra, conductor Stuart Stratford, Stone Records); The Angry Garden/Silvered Night (Royal Philharmonic Orchestra, conductor Hilary Davan Wetton, City of London Choir, Mark Bebbington); Reflections (Aquinas Piano Trio); When The Light Shines (Karen Stephenson, Sophia Rahman, Philippa Davies, Megumi Fujita). A brass quintet was recorded by Onyx Brass in January 2025 and is due for release before the end of the year.

== Personal life ==
Stimpson has been registered blind since 1977 as a result of the virus Guillain-Barré Syndrome. He works with hearing in one ear as a result of an acoustic neuroma in 2010. He lives in the Chalke Valley, near Salisbury.

== Selected compositions ==
=== Orchestral and choral ===
Age of Wonders - An Entangled Bank (string orchestra)

Age of Wonders - Transmutations (orchestra)

Clouds of War (choir, soli and orchestra)

Concerto for Oboe

Jesse Owens - opera

Silvered Night (piano and orchestra)

Songs of Innocence and Experience (a cappella choir, soli and spoken word)

The Angry Garden (choir, soli and orchestra)

The Ninth Hour: Four Latin Motets (a cappella choir)

=== Chamber ===
Age of Wonders - String Quartet No.2 (The Beagle)

And Then The Mist Rose (Piano Trio No.2)

A Walk Into War (tenor and piano quintet)

Illusive Years (Piano Trio No.1)

Songs from the opera Jesse Owens (soprano, baritone, piano)

Suite Gromignana (brass quintet)

The Sun and the Moon (clarinet quintet)

=== Solo and duo ===
Age of Wonders - The Man Who Walked With Henslow (violin and piano)

Cafe Music (guitar solo)

Dall'Alba al Tramonto (tenor and piano)

Drawings from the Shell (piano solo)

Dylan (baritone, harp, and spoken word)

Fanfara - il baccio della luce (trumpet solo)

Faulstone Hollow (violin and piano)

Five Miniatures (guitar solo)

L'Ora di Barga (soprano and piano)

Preludes In Our Time (piano solo)

Sonatina Pour le Vent (guitar solo)

Tales from the 15th Floor (cello and piano)

The Balancing of Opposites (flute and piano)

The Drowning of Capel Celyn (harp solo)

The Haze of Time (bassoon and cello)

The Stars Have Withdrawn Their Shining (harp solo)

Three Variants on a Blue (violin and piano)

Two Folk Pieces (harp solo)

Variations on Papaver Rhoeas (piano solo)
