= Francesco Raffaello Santoro =

Italian painter

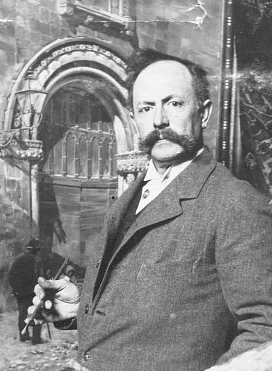
Francesco Raffaelo Santoro (date unknown)

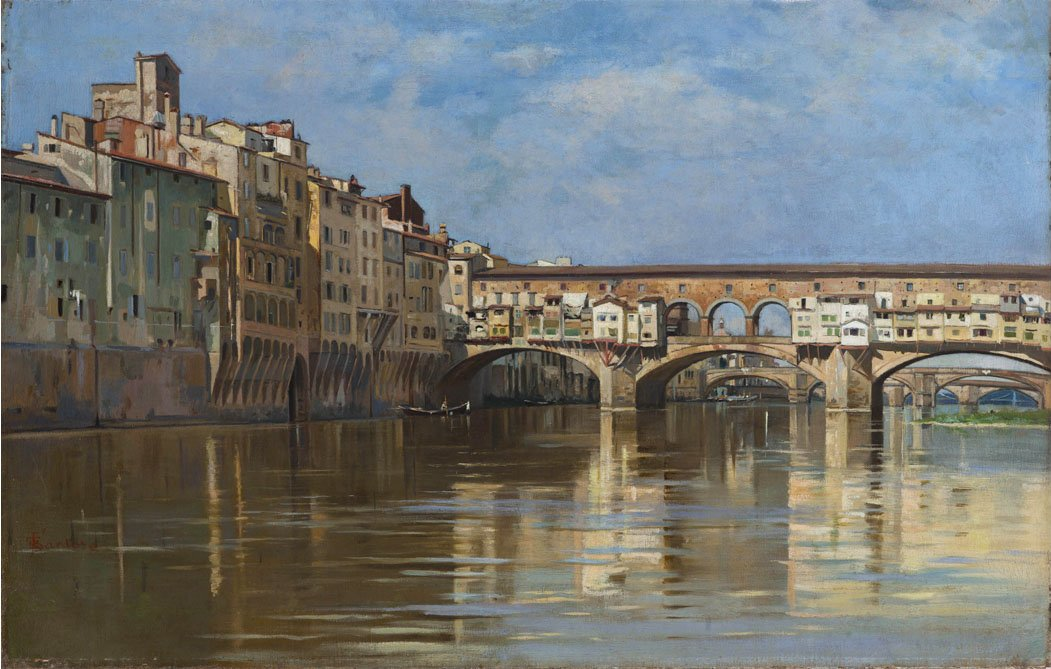
The Ponte Vecchio in Florence

Francesco Raffaello Santoro (1844, Cosenza – 1927, Rome) was an Italian painter. He was known for his work in landscapes and genre themes, both in oils and watercolours.

== Life and work ==
He was born in Cosenza in Calabria, to a family of artists. His cousin was the painter Rubens Santoro.

His first training was with his father, who founded a studio in Fuscaldo called Lithography Calabria, which mainly made copies of sacred works and portraits. By 1865, Francesco had moved to Naples at the Royal Institute of Fine Arts.

He obtained a stipend from the Provincial Council of Cosenza to study in Florence but, during 1864–1865, he travelled instead to England. In 1868, he obtained a stipend from the academy in Naples to study in Rome.

In 1885, he travelled again to Britain, and married a wealthy Scottish woman. Later, he returned to Rome to open a studio.

Santoro joined the Associazione degli Acquarellisti romani (Association of Watercolorists), created in 1875 by Ettore Roesler Franz, Nazzareno Cipriani, Cesare Maccari, Vincenzo Cabianca, Pio Joris and other artists.

Santoro lived much of his life in Rome. In 1890 in Turin, he exhibited Il Medico dell'anima and Momento d' ozio. In Milan in 1881 Santoro exhibited Dopo il lavoro, Ricordo d'Amalfi, and Prima tappa. At the 1883 Exposition of Fine Arts in Rome, he displayed Pascariello e compagnie bella. At the same exposition a few years later, Santoro exhibitedIl pane quotidiano and Non so ochiù bonu!.

At the 1887 Venetian Mostra Artistica of Fine Arts, Santoro displayed: Dolce far niente. Finally, in 1888 in Bologna: Ricordo delle montagne di Carrara.
