= Hugo Colella =

French footballer (born 1999)

Personal information
- Date of birth: 16 September 1999 (age 27)
- Place of birth: Strasbourg, France
- Height: 1.75 m (5 ft 9 in)
- Position: Midfielder

Youth career
- 2014–2015: Strasbourg
- 2015–2019: Metz

Senior career*
Years	Team	Apps	(Gls)
2019	Metz B	12	(0)
2019	Hessen Dreieich	6	(1)
2019–2021	Orléans B	17	(1)
2021–2022	Swift Hesperange	15	(2)
2021–2022	→ Virton (loan)	16	(0)
2022	Berliner AK 07	0	(0)
2022–2023	Orléans	8	(0)
2022–2023	Orléans B	9	(0)
2023–2025	Châteauroux	41	(0)
- * Club domestic league appearances and goals as of 26 May 2025

Hugo Colella (born 16 September 1999) is a French professional footballer who plays as a midfielder.

== Career statistics ==
=== Club ===
As of 15 September 2021

Club	Season	League			Cup		Other		Total	
Club	Season	Division	Apps	Goals	Apps	Goals	Apps	Goals	Apps	Goals
Metz B	2016–17	CFA2	2	0	–		0	0	2	0
Metz B	2017–18	Championnat National 3	10	0	–		0	0	10	0
Metz B	Total		12	0	0	0	0	0	12	0
Hessen Dreieich	2018–19	Regionalliga	6	1	0	0	0	0	6	1
Orléans B	2019–20	Championnat National 3	13	1	–		0	0	13	1
Orléans B	2020–21	Championnat National 3	4	0	–		0	0	4	0
Orléans B	Total		17	1	0	0	0	0	17	1
Swift Hesperange	2020–21	Luxembourg National Division	15	2	0	0	0	0	15	2
Swift Hesperange	2021–22	Luxembourg National Division	0	0	0	0	2 (Note: Appearances in the UEFA Europa Conference League)	0	2	0
Swift Hesperange	Total		15	2	0	0	2	0	17	2
Virton (loan)	2021–22	Proximus League	3	0	0	0	0	0	3	0
Career total			53	4	0	0	2	0	55	4
