= Amyris of Sybaris =

6th-century Greek person

Amyris (Ancient Greek: Ἄμυρις) of Sybaris in Magna Graecia, surnamed "the Wise", whose son was one of the suitors of Agariste of Sicyon, at the beginning of the sixth century BCE. Amyris was sent by his fellow-citizens to consult the Delphic oracle. His reputation for wisdom gave rise to the proverb Ἄμυρις μαίνεται, "the wise man is mad".
