= Eugenio Tano =

Italian painter (1840–1914)

Eugenio Tano (July 4, 1840 – 1914) was an Italian painter.

He was born in Marzi, near Cosenza in Calabria, Kingdom of the Two Sicilies; his father was a painter of religious subjects. Eugenio received his first training in Rogliano, his mother's native town. He later attended the Academy of Fine Arts in Naples and, after the unification of Italy, he studied in Florence with Stefano Ussi.

In 1860 Eugenio participated in Garibaldi's enterprise in Sicily and the Kingdom of Naples. He lived for many years in Florence. At the 1877 Mostra Nazionale of Naples, he exhibits: Portrait of a Garibaldi; at the 1880 Turin exhibition: Priest in Countryside, and in the 1881 Milan Exhibition, L'Arno, a landscape. At the 1884 Promotrice of Florence, he exhibits: Dall' Ardenza ad Antignano. In 1885, in Milan and the next year in Venice, he displayed an Un bagno nascosto. At the Exposition of Livorno in 1886, Tano sent a Portrait of a Garibaldi. He also painted genre and portraits, including Queen Margherita.
