= Rocco Jemma =

Italian physician (1866–1949)

- Born: August 16, 1866; Laureana di Borrello, Calabria, Italy
- Died: March 24, 1949 (aged 82); Naples
- Scientific career
- Fields: Medicine
- Workplaces: University of Genoa

Rocco Jemma (August 16, 1866 – March 24, 1949) was an Italian pediatrician.

== Biography ==
Jemma became Director of Pediatric Clinic in Palermo in 1893. He held this position until 1914 when he left it to his pupil Giovanni Di Cristina and took the same role in Naples. His studies focused mainly on the infectious (confirmation of the etiology of the leishmaniasis parasite, vaccine therapy of typhoid, paratyphoid, melitense infection) and nutrition (infant nutrition disorders). In 1929 new Pediatric Clinic in Naples was inaugurated under his direction.

== Bibliography ==
- Italo Farnetani, Rocco Jemma il più grande pediatra italiano, Cogral, Limbadi (VV) 2006, pp. 74.
- Italo Farnetani, Storia della pediatria italiana, Società Italiana di Pediatria, Genova, 2008, pp. 72–73, 76, 80–81. ISBN 978-88-905768-0-5
- Giuseppe Caronia, "Rocco Jemma (1866 - 1949) in <<LA PEDIATRIA>>. Estratto. Anno LVII. 1949.
- Italo Farnetani, Francesca Farnetani, La top twelve della ricerca italiana, « Minerva Pediatrica» 2015; 67 (5): pp. 437–450 .
- Italo Farnetani, Qualche notazione di storia della pediatria, in margine alla V edizione di Pediatria Essenziale, Postfazione. In Burgio G.R.( (a cura di). Pediatria Essenziale. 5a Ed. Milano: Edi-Ermes; 2012. ISBN 9788870512250. vol. 2°, pp. 1757–1764.
