= Cosimo Schepis =

Italian artist and art restorer

- Born: April 23, 1955 (age 69); Reggio di Calabria, Italy
- Citizenship: Italian
- Education: Accademia di Belle Arti di Reggio Calabria
- Occupation(s): Artist, Sculptor, and Art Restorer
- Notable work: Restoration of the Riace Bronzes
- Movement: I Mediterranei

Cosimo Giorgio Schepis, known as Nuccio Schepis, (born April 23, 1955) is an Italian artist, sculptor, and art restorer. He took part in the Southern Italian Expressionist Movement called "I Mediterranei", which started in the 1980s.

He is also noted for playing a major role in the 2010–2011 restoration of the historic Riace bronzes (Italian: i Bronzi di Riace).

== Extended Readings ==
- Frangipane, Alfonso, and Mattia Preti. "Mostra - "I Mediterranei"" Istituto Istruzione Superiore "M. Preti - A. Frangipane" Istituto Istruzione Superiore "M. Preti - A. Frangipane", n.d.
- "Nuccio Schepis Respinge Al Mittente Le Polemiche Sul Presunto ‘abbandono’ Dei Bronzi Di Riace." Fame Di Sud. Ed. Aliamedia Società Cooperativa Editrice. Redazione, 5 Sept. 2013.
- "Nuccio Schepis, Restauratore Bronzi Di Riace, Eccellenza Mondiale: "Ho Vissuto Anche a Novara"" on YouTube Citta Di Novara. Città Di Novara, 02 Sept. 2013.
- "Stretto Di Messina: Alla Ricerca Del Ponte Che Non C'è." National Geographic. Gruppo Editoriale L'Espresso S.p.A., n.d.
