= Rosario Rubbettino =

Italian publisher

Rosario Rubbettino (February 13, 1941 – October 7, 2000) was a noted Italian publisher.

== Biography ==
Rosario Rubbettino was born in Soveria Mannelli, a little town in the province of Catanzaro, in 1941. In 1973 he founded his own publishing house, Rubbettino Editore, located in Soveria Mannelli. He died in Soveria Mannelli on October 7, 2000, aged 59.

== Bibliography ==
- Rosario Rubbettino in the Enciclopedia italiana
