= Christopher Catrambone =

Italian-American entrepreneur and humanitarian

Christopher Paul Catrambone is an Italian American entrepreneur and humanitarian, best known for founding the Migrant Offshore Aid Station (MOAS), a global humanitarian organization dedicated to responding quickly and efficiently to emerging crises .

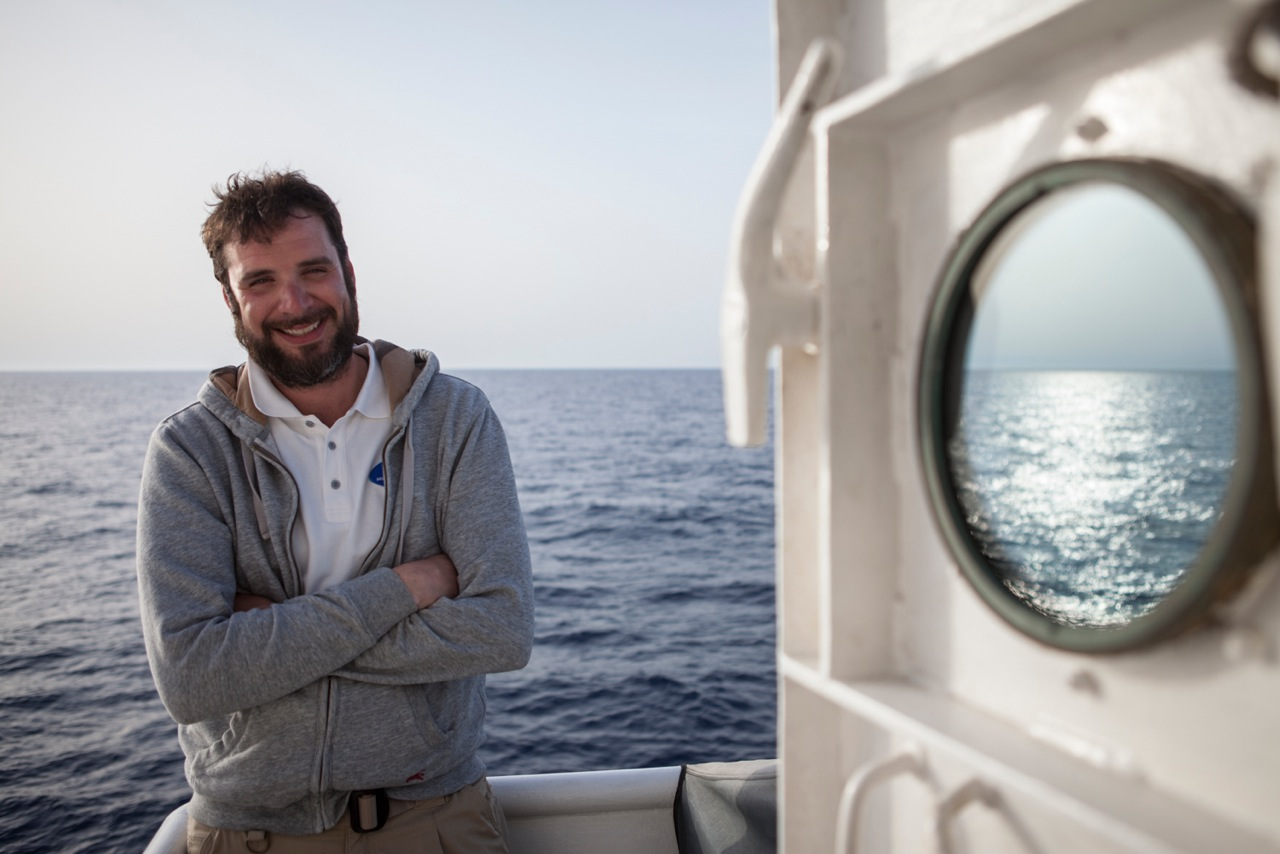

== Early life and education ==
Catrambone was born in Lake Charles, Louisiana. He graduated in 2002 from McNeese State University.

== Personal life ==
After Hurricane Katrina damaged his New Orleans home, he moved to Reggio Calabria, Italy and later to Malta.

== Career ==
Catrambone set up Tangiers Group in 2006, a group of companies based in Malta, specializing in insurance, emergency assistance and intelligence.

Catrambone founded the Migrant Offshore Aid Station (MOAS) in 2013, an NGO dedicated to reducing human suffering and providing aid and assistance to vulnerable communities in areas of crisis.

Catrambone is the founder of the Organisation for Better Security (OBS), an international forum for people who live and work in conflict zones.

=== Honors and awards ===
In 2015, Catrambone received the Medal for Service for the Republic of Malta (Midalja għall-Qadi tar-Repubblika), for his work with MOAS.

He was named one of Foreign Policy's 100 Global Thinkers of 2015.
