= Nicola Squitti =

Nicola Squitti, Baron of Palermiti and Guarna (July 26 1853 in Maida – January 3 1933 in Rome) was an Italian diplomat and politician.

Nicola Squitti was the brother of Baldassarre Squitti, and Eleanora Maria Squitti, lady-in-waiting to Queen Margherita of Savoy, children of Tommaso Squitti, Baron of Palermiti and Guarna, born September 8, 1831, and his wife Rosina Astanti. Nicola Squitti inherited the title of Baron of Palermiti and Guarna from his father on July 13, 1886.

On January 23, 1887, Baron Squitti, under instructions from the State Department the Italian Consul at Philadelphia, conducted an inquiry into the death of Michael Fezano; an Italian frozen to death in a lockup in the City of Carbondale, USA on Christmas Day. Fezano and four of his companions were arrested for drunkenness and placed in a lockup. All but Fezano secured release by paying heavy fines. He was left in all night and found the next night, frozen. The case created a great sensation, and a prosecution began against the Carbondale City authorities by the Iazzinf Society of Scranton.

During the 1890s he was the consul for all Australasian Colonies.

Nicola Squitti was a member of the Italian Senate. He was the Italian foreign minister in Cetinje, 1908–1913, and at Belgrade, 1913–1916.

== Honours ==
- (Kingdom of Italy) : Knight Grand Cross of the Order of the Crown of Italy
- (Kingdom of Italy) : Commander of the Order of Saints Maurice and Lazarus
