= Francesco Poli =

Italian art critic and curator (born 1949)

- Born: Turin
- Occupations: Art critic, exhibition curator

Francesco Poli (born 1949, Turin, Italy) is an Italian art critic and curator. He teaches History of Contemporary Art at the Academy of Fine Arts of Brera (Milan, Italy). He is also "chargé de cours" at University of Paris 8 and teaches Art and Communication at the University of Turin.

Poli writes regularly for several art journals and magazines, including Tema Celeste, and for the daily newspaper La Stampa; He also worked as the art critic for the Italian newspaper Il Manifesto, focusing primarily on 20th century art.

== Publications ==
- Produzione artistica e mercato, Einaudi, Turin, 1975
- L’arte bella, Feltrinelli, Milan 1979 (with Luciano Caramel)
- La Metafisica, Laterza, Milan 1989 (reprinted and expanded in 2004)
- Giulio Paolini, Lindau, Turin, 1990
- Dizionario di arte contemporanea (with Martina Corgnati), Feltrinelli, Milan, 1994
- Minimalismo, Arte Povera, Arte Concettuale, Laterza, Rome, 1995 (VIII edition 2009)
- Catalogo generale delle opere di Felice Casorati. I dipinti, (with Giorgina Bertolino), 2 vol., Allemandi, Turin, 1996 (II edition in 3 books, Le sculture e l’aggiornamento dipinti, 2004)
- Il sistema dell’arte contemporanea, Laterza 1999 (IX edition. 2008)
- Gian Enzo Sperone. Torino, Roma, New York, Hopeful Monster, Turin, 2000
- Dizionario dell’arte del Novecento (with Martina Corgnati), Bruno Mondadori, Milan, 2001 (pocket book 2009)
- Arte Contemporanea. Le ricerche internazionali dagli anni Cinquanta a oggi, Electa, Milan, 2003 (IV ed. 2008)
- La scultura del Novecento, Laterza, Rome, 2006.
- Arte Moderna. Dal postimpressionismo all’informale, Electa, Milan, 2007
- Felice Casorati: Art & Dossier, Giunti, Florence, 2007
- Arte contemporanea, Arnoldo Mondatori Editore, Milan, 2007
- L’arte del Novecento in Piemonte, Regione Piemonte, Priuli & Verlucca, Turin, 2008
- Gli anni Cinquanta, Arte Contemporanea, Electa, Milan, 2008

== Curated exhibitions ==
- "Standing Sculpture" (with Rudi Fuchs e Johnalbert Gachnang), Castello di Rivoli, Turin, 1988
- "Il colore del lavoro" (with Claudia Gian Ferrari), Mole Antonelliana, Turin, toured to Palazzo Reale, Milano; Palazzo Gotico, Piacenza, 1990
- "Pinot Gallizio nell’Europa dei dissimmetrici", Promotrice delle Belle Arti, Turin, 1992
- "Persone", Italian Pavilion, XLV Venice Biennale, 1993
- "Felice Casorati", Palazzo Bricherasio, Turin, 1996
- XIII Rome Quadriennial, Palazzo delle Esposizioni, Rome, 1999
- "Da Warhol al 2000: Gian Enzo Sperone 35 anni di mostre tra Europa e America", Palazzo Cavour, Turin, 2000
- "Naif? Da Rousseau a Ligabue", Palazzo Bricherasio, Turin, 2002
- "André Derain: La forma classica", Centro St. Benin, Aosta, e Museo della Permanente, Milan, 2003
- "L’estetica della macchina: Da Balla al futurismo torinese"(con altri)", Palazzo Cavour, Turin, 2005
- "Chronos: Il tempo nell’arte dall’età barocca a oggi", Ex-Filatoio, Caraglio, 2005
- XIII Biennale Internazionale di Scultura di Carrara, 2008
- "In-Finitum" (with Axel Vervoordt, Daniela Ferretti, Gian Domenico Romanelli), Palazzo Fortuny, Venice, 2009
- "Alberto Burri", Palazzo Clemente Fondazione Menegaz, Borgo Medioevale di Castelbasso, 2009
