= Domenico Spanò Bolani =

Italian politician and historian

Domenico Spanò Bolani (Reggio di Calabria, 12 April 1815 – 29 June 1890) was an Italian politician and historian, author of a book concerning the history of Reggio from ancient times (15th century BC) to 1797 AD. He was a member of Parliament of Kingdom of Italy and mayor of Reggio under both the Kingdom of the Two Sicilies and the newly constituted Savoyard Kingdom of Italy. The first Civic Museum in Reggio, created at the beginning of the 19th century, was later named after him.
