= Giuseppe Antonio Sorbilli =

Italian painter (1824-1890)

Giuseppe Antonio Sorbilli (Zammarò. a frazione of San Gregorio d'Ippona, in what is now the Province of Vibo Valentia, Calabria, 1824–1890) was an Italian sculptor.

== Early life ==
By late childhood he was apprenticed to a master of calligraphy, in Munteleone di Calabria. The prince Giardinelli, intendent of that province, helped patronize him, but at the age of 17 years, his father sent him to Naples to work with the painter Giuseppe Cammarano.

== Career ==
Soon after, he entered the studio of Francesco Citarelli, but unhappy, he went to study with Gennaro Calì. The provincial government granted him a stipend for six years. After these six, through a contest in Rome, he won another stipend, but the events of 1848 in Rome, lost him his prize. Sorbilli fought with the Roman Republic. He then moved to Naples. Among his works in Naples were a Christ and a San Tommaso, which won a gold medal at a local exhibition. He was also awarded for his statue titled Science of Art place in the Technical Institute of Naples. Among his works are Saints Matthew and Mark for the crossing of the Cathedral of Avellino; bas-reliefs depicting the Marriage of the Virgin and the Visitation of the Virgin for the cathedral of Capua; the Prayer and the Silence; Angel of Peace; A crying Genius. The statue of Cimarosa in the vestibule of the San Carlo Theater, for which he was named honorary professor at the Neapolitan Academy. His bas-relief of St Peter freed by Angel is found at the Royal Institute of Fine Arts of Naples.
