= Vincenzo Caglioti =

Italian chemist

- Born: Vincenzo Caglioti; 26 May 1902; Soriano Calabro, Italy
- Died: 1 December 1998 (aged 96); Rome, Italy
- Education: University of Naples Federico II
- Known for: Inorganic Chemistry
- Awards: Italian National Prize for Chemistry
- Scientific career
- Fields: Chemistry
- Workplaces: University of Rome "La Sapienza; National Research Council of Italy
- Doctoral advisor: Ferruccio Zambonini
- Doctoral students: Vincenzo Aquilanti

Vincenzo Caglioti (born 26 May 1902 – 1 December 1998) was an Italian chemist and Academician.

== Career ==
He graduated in Chemistry at University of Naples Federico II and became professor at the University of Florence in 1936. In 1938 became professor at University of Rome "La Sapienza, where he works until 1977.

He was member of the Accademia dei Lincei from 27 August 1947. In 1957 he received the National Prize for Chemistry.

He was president of the National Research Council of Italy from 1965 to 1972.
