= Rubens Santoro =

Italian painter

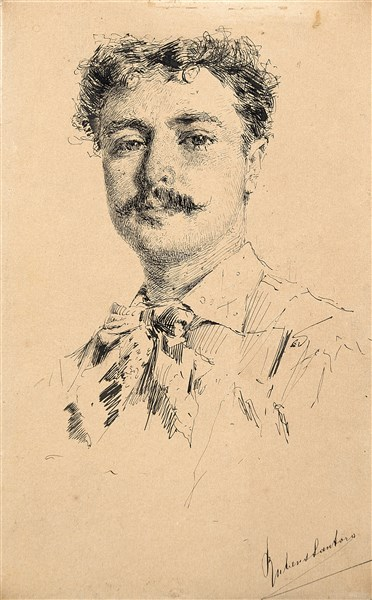
Self-portrait (date unknown)

Rubens Santoro (26 October 1859 in Mongrassano, Province of Cosenza, Calabria – 30 December 1941 in Naples) was an Italian painter.

== Biography ==
He moved to Naples at 10 years of age to study literature, but his inclination was painting. He only briefly enrolled at the Neapolitan Academy; instead, real life was his model. His first work was a small and simple genre piece: A Girl who Laughs, exhibited at the Promotrice. Domenico Morelli took note and encouraged him.

He began painting landscapes at Granatello, near Naples, where the painter Marià Fortuny was visiting. Fortuny commented to his fellow painter that:

Many end up where you started .... (you) continue to study more from life; of the ancient painters only two or three will learn from nature to add to their art. I had to work twelve years, and God knows what and how much effort, to break the gates of the Academy within which I had imprisoned myself, while you breathe the open and have attained it already.

Santoro continually changed his vistas, painting in Torre Annunziata, Castellammare di Stabia, Procida, the Amalfi Coast, and Resina. During his long trips to the open countryside, he entertained himself by playing the mandolin. Many of his Amalfi landscapes were bought by the Goupil Gallery. Two were displayed at the 1877 Exposition at Naples: Marina di Maiuri and Grotta degli Zingari. At the Isle of Capri, he completed the following canvases sent to the 1880 Turin Exhibition: Marina of Naples; Pozzo; Zingara; Zingare; Cavalcavia; Monte Tiberio; Quiete (a half-figure of a woman); Giovinezza; and Vecchiezza. At Venice he painted the vedute: Cloister of San Gregorio; Via di Piccioni; Wooden House; San Barnaba; Ponte de' Turchetti; Al sole; Le lavoratrici di coralli; Blue House; and Grand canal.

He then moved to Paris, and after an excursion in England, returned to Naples even more prolific. Colnaghi, the art merchant of London, commissioned paintings for Stewart Gardner from the artist. His painting Verona exhibited at the 1911 exhibition of Barcelona was awarded a Silver medal.

The painter Francesco Raffaello Santoro was his cousin.

== Selected paintings ==
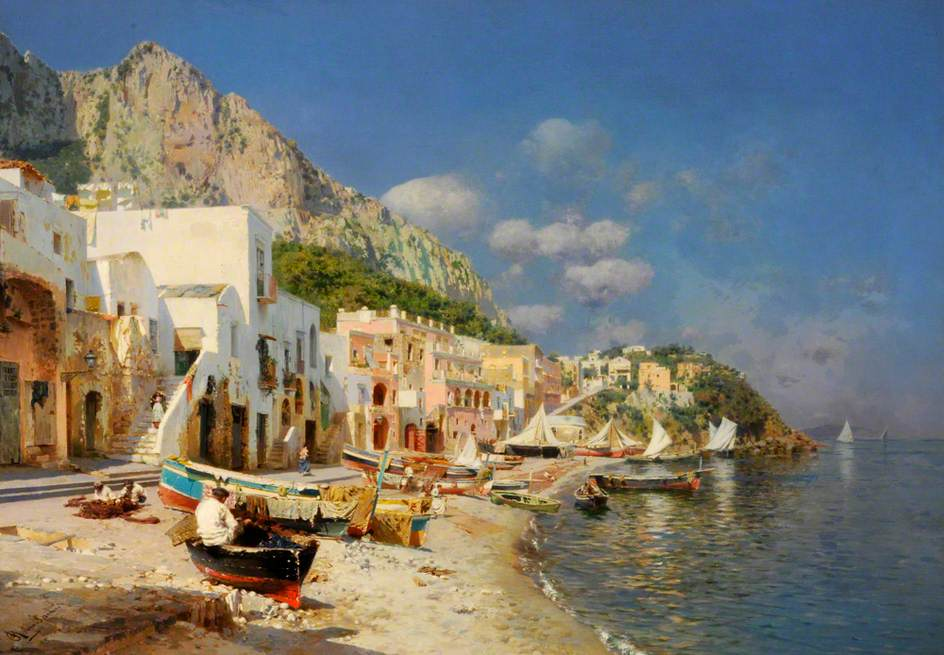
Capri

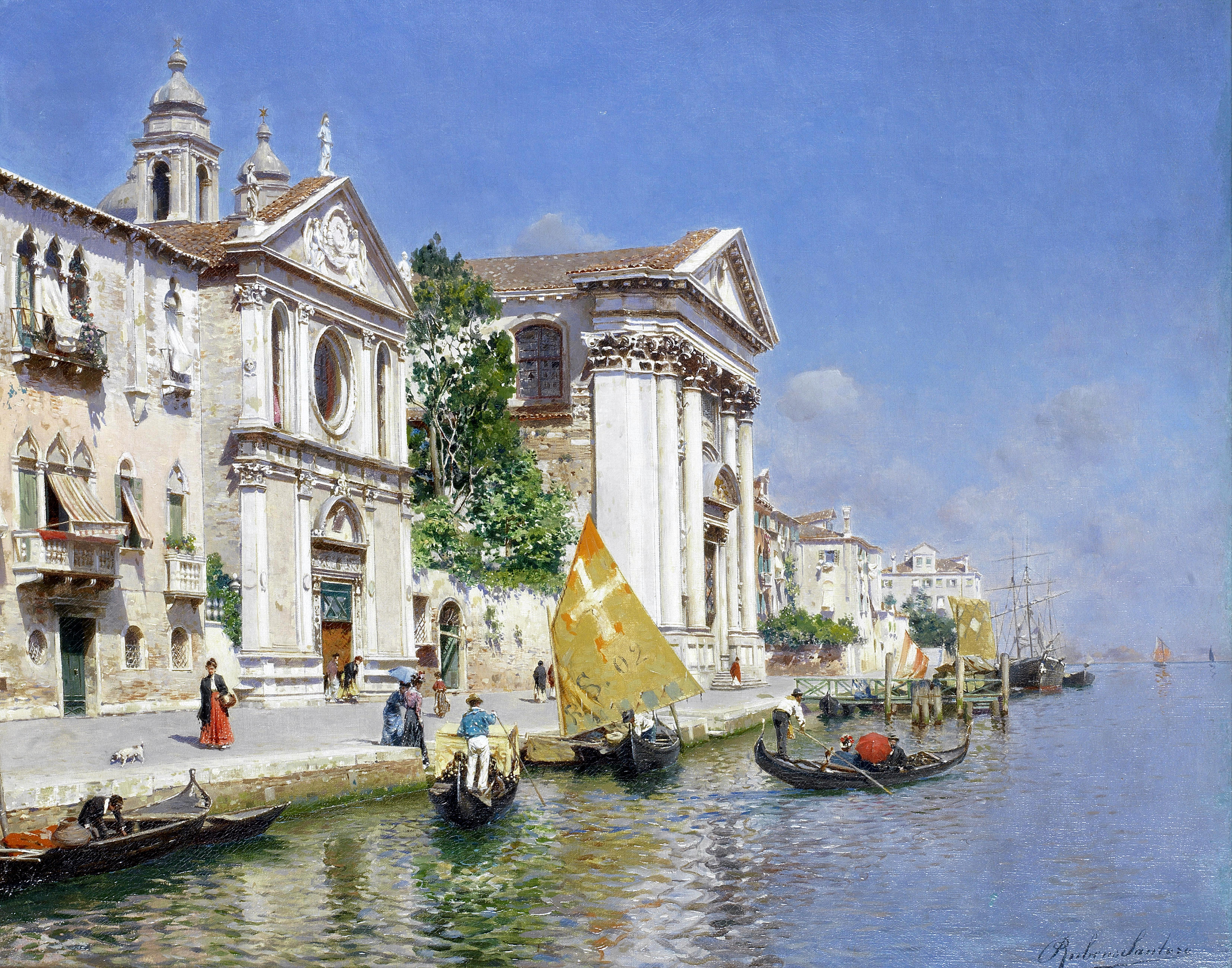
The Zattera and church of the Gesuati

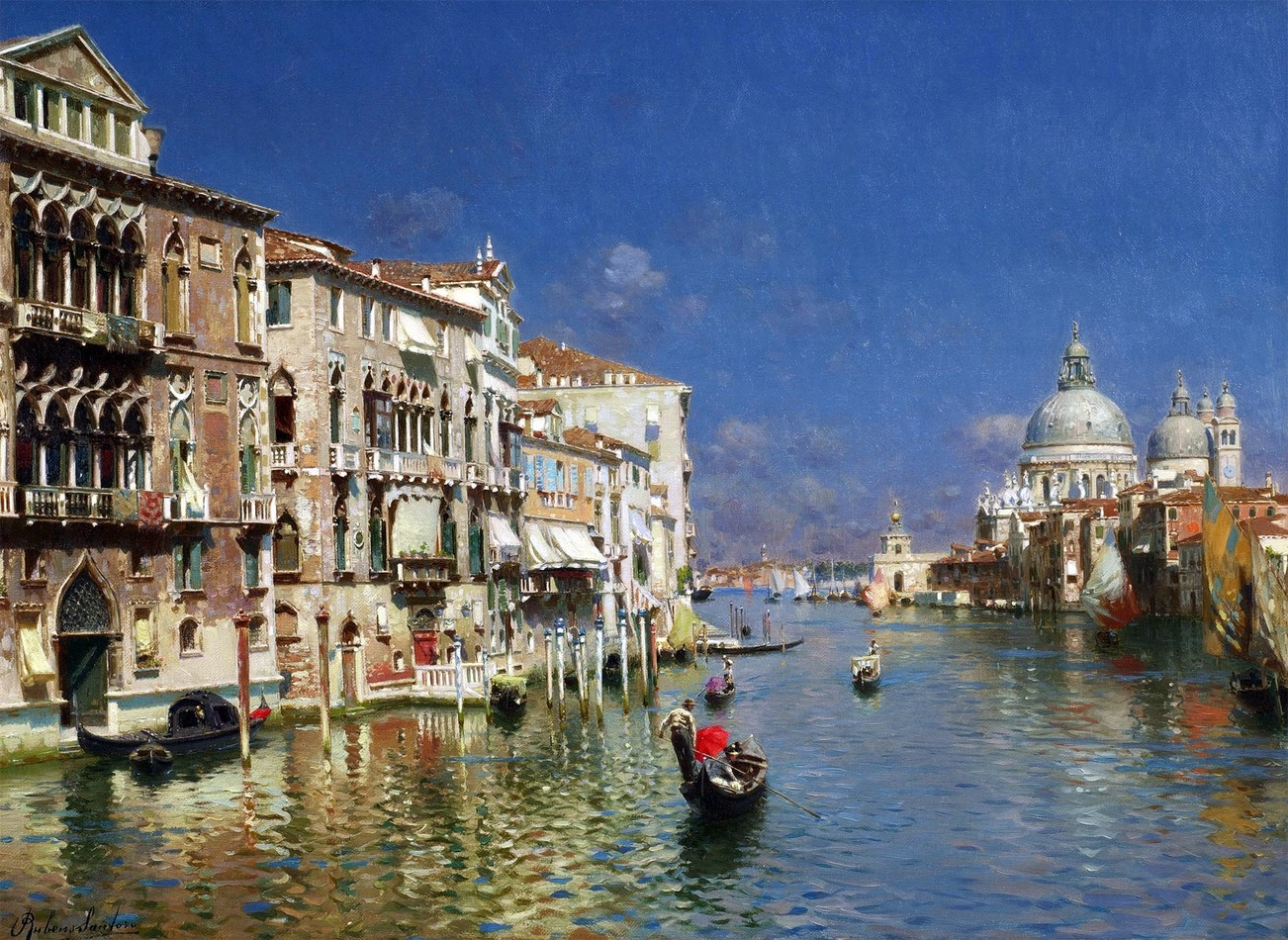
The Grand Canal

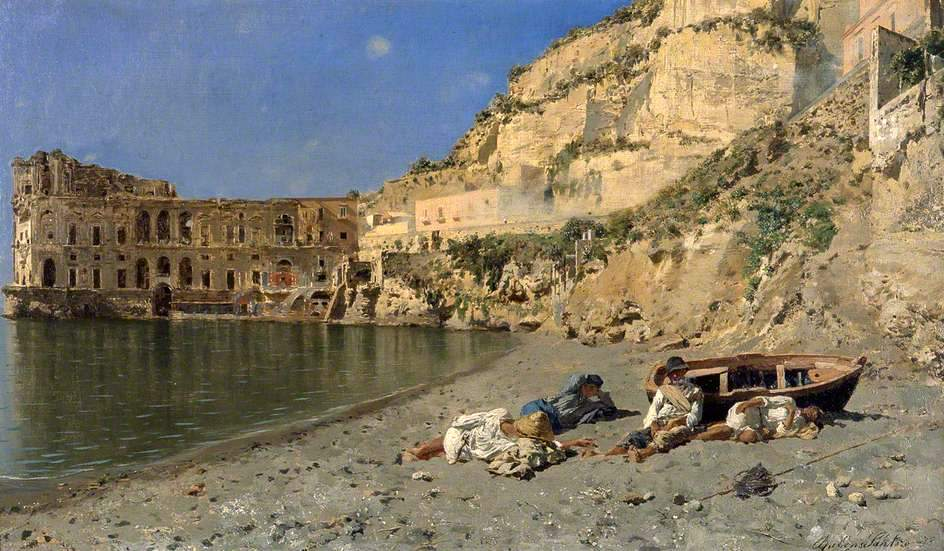
A Siesta in Sunshine

== Other sources ==
- Rubens Santoro e i pittori della provincia di Cosenza fra Otto e Novecento, by Tonino Sicoli, Isabella Valente, Maria A. Picone Tetrusa. Edizioni AR & S, 2003.
