= Antonio Tallura =

Italian actor, educator, and writer (born 1958)

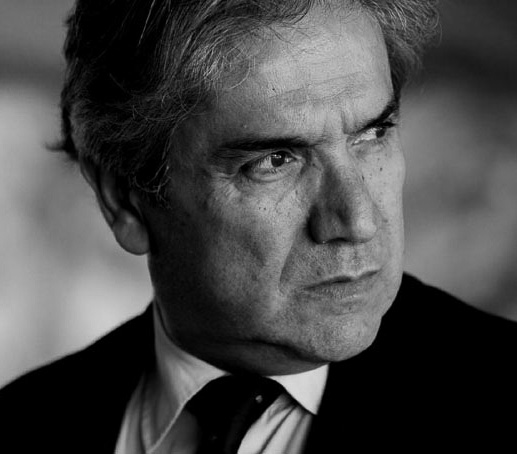
- Tallura in 2015
- Born: 11 February 1958 (age 68); Locri, Italy
- Education: Accademia Nazionale d'Arte Drammatica Silvio D'Amico
- Occupations: Actor; educator; writer

Antonio Tallura (born 11 February 1958) is an Italian actor, educator, and writer.

He is known for his numerous appearances in the theater, as well as in films and television series. He is also a teacher of diction and phonetics.

== Early life and education ==
Antonio Tallura was born in Locri, Reggio Calabria, on 11 February 1958, to Calabrian parents. He spent his teenage years attending an open-air cinema in the country, where his passion for acting was inspired by interpreting certain characters the film. In addition, he spent his free time in Locri's rich archaeological finds, shrines and temples, often going at the archaeological site of Locri's Roman Greek Theatre where, thanks to meeting with teachers and local designers, he began to cultivate his great passion for acting and theater.

In 1978, he moved to Rome, and began attending the Silvio d'Amico National Academy of Dramatic Arts, where he graduated in 1981.

== Personal life ==
He plays in Italian National Football Actors for charity meetings and serves on the board of directors.

== Theatre ==
- 2015–2016 Uno Sguardo dal Ponte di A. Miller- Regia di E. M. Lamanna
- 2014–2015 Pierino e il Lupo Acc. Reale della Calabria
- 2012–2013 Il TARTUFO di Moliere Regia di G. Anfuso
- 2010–2011 L’Affarista Mercadet di Balzac Regia A. Calenda
- 2009–2010 Krooner (N. Arigliano) Regia F. Abbondati
- 1988–2000 Riccardo III di William Shakespeare Regia A. Calenda
- 1996–1997 Edipo a Colono Regia di A.Calenda
- 1992–1993 Madre Courage Regia di A. Calenda
- 1995–1996 Romeo e Giulietta Regia di Giuseppe Patroni GRIFFI
- 1994–1995 Sabato Domenica e Lunedi di E. de Filippo Regia di Giuseppe Patroni GRIFFI
- 1984–1985 Cosi E’ se vi Pare di L. Pirandello Regia di F. Zeffirelli
- 1985–1986 Il DIAVOLO e il Buon DIO Regia G. Lavia
- 1987 FAUST Regia di G, SBRAGIA
- 1986–1987 GIULIO CESARE Regia di K. Zanussi
- 1982–1983 ARTURO UI Regia di G. SEPE
- 1981–1982 Cosi E’ Se Vi Pare Regia di G. SEPE
- 1982 Intorno a Garibaldi Regia di M. Perlini
- 1988 Barry Lindon Regia di A. Aglioti
- 1987–1988 Invito in Scena con Delitto Regia di M.Cinque
- 1989–1990 La Lupa Regia di P. de Cristofaro
- 1991 MEDEA Regia di P. de Cristofaro
- 1991–1992 La Ciociara Regia di A. Reggiani
- 1990–1991 La Bisbetica Domata Regia di A. Zucchi
- 1992 W Campanile Regia di A. Venturi
- 1990 Interrogatorio a Maria Regia di G. Dolcini
- 1993 Falcone e Borsellino Regia di G. Torlonia
- 1988 La Locandiera Regia di S. Cardone
- 1993 I Guardiani di Porci Regia Marsili - Corbucci
- 2022–2023 Testimone d'accusa, di Agatha Christie, regia di Geppy Gleijeses

== Television ==
- Questo è il mio Paese (RAI 1)
- Provaci ancora Prof (RAI 1)
- Squadra Antimafia (CANALE 5)
- REX (RAI 1)
- LA LADRA (RAI 1)
- LA SQUADRA (RAI 3)
- Niente di Personale (Crimini RAI 2)
- INCANTESIMO 2001-2008 (RAI1)
- I Misteri di villa Flamini (Canale 5)
- ORGOGLIO (RAI 1)
- VIVERE (Canale 5)
- Cento Vetrine (Canale 5)
- La Nuova Squadra (RAI 3)
- Un Posto al Sole (RAI 3)

== Mini Dramas ==
- Mi Manda Lubrano (RAI3)
- IL Giudice (RAI 1)
- Una Lepre con il Volto da Bambina (RAI1)
- Noi Lazzaroni (RAI 1)

== Cinema ==
- Piacere io sono Piero regia E. Carone
- Il Mistero della Donna del Treno (opera prima in 3 d) Regia di F. Femia
- Garofalo Regia di Pappi CORSICATO
- L’Ultimo RE regia di Aurelio Grimaldi
- San Francesco di Paola regia di Fabio Marra
- Bonjour Michel regia Arcangelo Bonaccorso
- Le Cinque Rose di Jennifer regia di Tomaso Schermann
- Quelli Della Speciale regia di Bruno Corbucci
- Libero di Volare regia di Fabio Mancuso
- Un Sindaco Fuori dal Comune regia di Fabio Mancuso

== Radio ==
- TITANIC (Radio 2)
- J. F. KENNEDY (Radio 2)

== Books ==
- “ NACA MIA “ Edition Il Portichetto di Cuneo
  (Poems in the vernacular Calabrese won several awards)
- “ ‘NU CANTU “ Ed. Laruffa di Reggio Cal.
  (Short stories and monologues for theater staged in different years)
