= Demetrio Nava =

Italian polymath (1758–1817)

Demetrio Nava (9 June 1758 - 23 September 1817) was an Italian jurist, priest, polymath, and historian.

== Biography ==
He was born in Reggio di Calabria. After studying locally, he was named a canon in the Cathedral in his native city. Among his works are:

- Cronica delle cose memorabili di Reggio
- De Saracenorum in Sicilia irruptione (of the Saracen capture of Sicily)
- Lezioni populari su cose d'agricoltura (describes the cultivation and preparation of products from Reggio)
- Dissertazione fisico-istorica sulle cagioni e sugli effetti del tremuoto
- Gli Sconvolgimenti seguiti in tutti la Calabria ultra per il tremuoto del 1783
- Fata Morgana
- Posizione ed istoria de Bagni d'Alì
- Descrizione storico-economico-politica dell'isola della Favignana
