= Antonio D'Oppido =

Italian swimmer (born 1944)

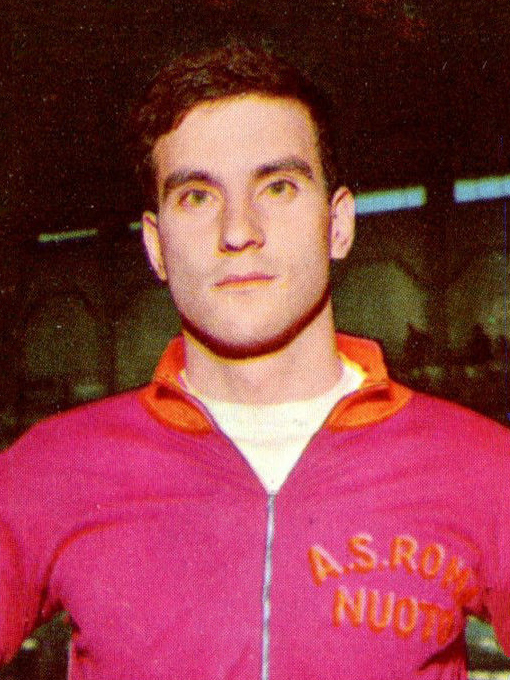

Personal information
- Born: 27 August 1944 (age 81) Crotone, Italy

Sport
- Sport: Swimming
- Strokes: Freestyle, medley
Medal record
Representing Italy
Mediterranean Games
Gold medal – first place	1971 İzmir	200 medley

Antonio D'Oppido (born 27 August 1944) is a retired Italian swimmer who won the 200 m individual medley event at the 1971 Mediterranean Games. He continued competing in his 60s, at the national level. His brother Michele is also a competitive swimmer.
