= Francesco Colelli =

Italian painter

Francesco Colelli (1734–1820) was an Italian painter, active in Calabria.

== Early life ==
He was born in Nicastro, now part of Lamezia Terme in Calabria.

== Career ==
He painted in a provincial, late-Baroque style which would have been prevalent a century before. He often painted religious frescoes in churches, including a Deposition from the Cross for the church of the Veterana in Cosenza, stolen in 1960. He also painted a Last Supper (1762), for the Cathedral of Nicastro.
