= Michele D'Oppido =

Italian swimmer (born 1949)

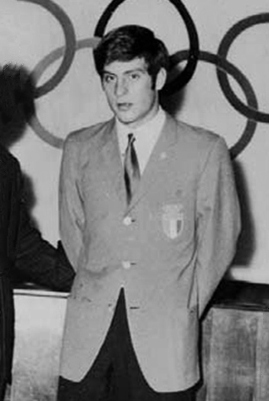
- Michele D'Oppido in 1968

Personal information
- Nationality: Italian
- Born: 10 February 1949 (age 77) Crotone, Italy
- Height: 1.88 m (6 ft 2 in)
- Weight: 77 kg (170 lb)

Sport
- Sport: Swimming
- Strokes: Freestyle, medley
Medal record
Representing Italy
Mediterranean Games
Gold medal – first place	1971 Izmir	200m individual medley

Michele D'Oppido (born 10 February 1949) is a retired Italian swimmer. He competed at the 1968 Summer Olympics in the 100 m freestyle and 200 m and 400 m individual medley events, but failed to reach the finals. He finished fifth in the 200 m medley at the 1970 European Championships. His brother Antonio was also a competitive swimmer.
