= Francesco La Monaca =

Italian painter

Francesco or Francis La Monaca (10 February 1882 – 5 February 1937) was an Italian painter and sculptor.

== Biography ==
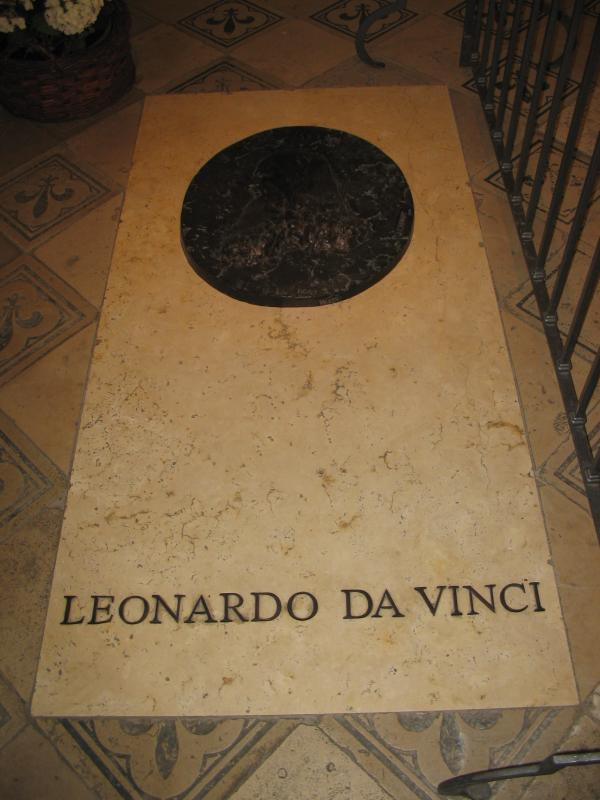
Tombstone marking the presumed remains of Leonardo da Vinci in the Chapel of Saint Hubert, Château d'Amboise

Francesco was born in Catanzaro, Calabria. By age 19, he had joined the army but soon sought scholarships to study art. Unsuccessful, he emigrated to Paris, where he frequented the École des Beaux-Arts as a student of the sculptors Thomas and Injalbert. Funding his study as a laborer and handyman, he encountered the painters Picasso, Matisse, and Modigliani; yet his style would remain more classic and academic. In 1909, he first exhibited with the Salon des Artistes Français; he would continue exhibiting in this forum, including works such as The Poverty (1911); Victory of David and Napoleon on Horseback (1912); The Heroes of the Sea (1913); The Last Effort (1914); The Pain, Solitude, and Love Disarmed (1920); portraits (1923); a bust (1924); Faunesse enviree (1927); and La baccante (1930).

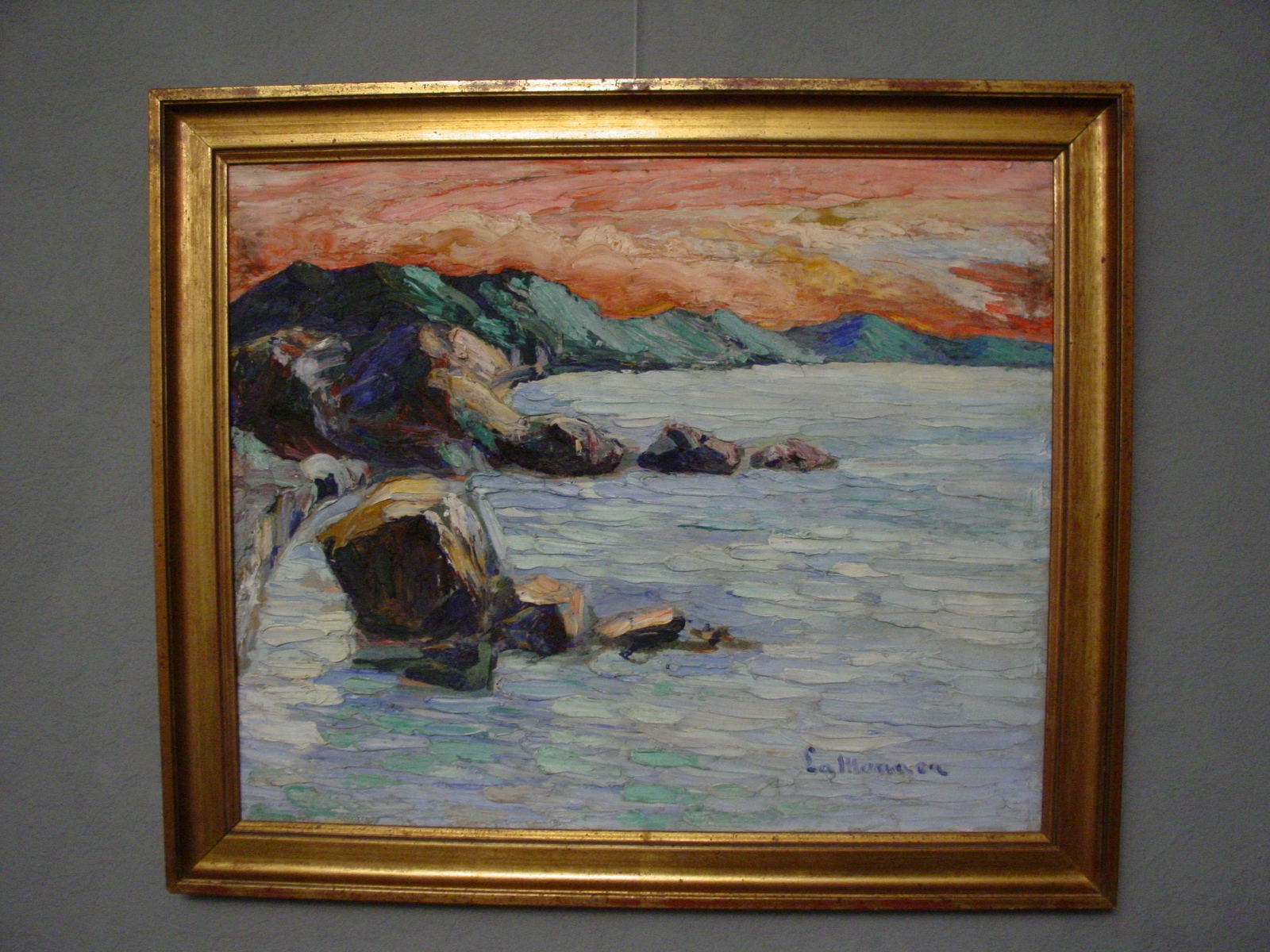
The painting depicts the Italian coast near Capri. The painting is very expressive and was painted around 1910-20. Oil on wood. Without frame 65x54cm. Signet: La Monaca

In 1914, he traveled to London, but his studio failed and he returned to Paris, becoming a sketch artist during the war, drawing under the pseudonym Lemoine. In 1921, he traveled to United States, where he met some success, and returned to Europe, opening a studio again in London, where he also found success. He exhibited at the Fine Art Gallery a series of 34 bronze and marble statuary busts of prominent men including George Bernard Shaw and the Archbishop of Canterbury. He became much in demand for portraits and traveled through the continent.

In 1930 he depicted the journalist Emilia Cardona, (Note: Cardona then was married to the elder painter Giovanni Boldini.) in Signora in Pelliccia di Lontra. Widowed two years later at the age of 32, Emilia married Francesco. That year he opened a studio in Rome. In 1933 he completed a Portrait of Pope Pius XI, displayed in the Vatican. In 1935 he completed a monument to Leonardo da Vinci for his tomb at the Château d'Amboise. He died in Washington, D.C., where he had traveled to create a portrait of President Franklin D. Roosevelt.

He was buried in Neuilly-sur-Seine, France.

An exhibit of his works, curated by Antonio Falbo, was held in May through April, 2008 at the Sale Museali della Rocca Sforzesca, Soncino.
