= Laronia gens =

The gens Laronia was a minor family at ancient Rome. The most famous of the Laronii was Quintus Laronius, consul suffectus in 33 BC. Other Laronii are known from inscriptions.

== Members ==
This list includes abbreviated praenomina. For an explanation of this practice, see filiation.

- Quintus Laronius, served under Marcus Vipsanius Agrippa during the war with Sextus Pompeius in 36 BC, and relieved the forces under Lucius Cornificius at Tauromenium. In 33 he was appointed consul suffectus in the place of Gaius Fonteius Capito.
- Publius Laronius Probatus.
- Quintus Laronius Hermo, named in a sepulchral inscription at the house of Decimus Antoninus Phrygepanis in Rome.
- Marcus Laronius Italicus, named on a sepulchral tablet found at Rome, and now in the Capitoline Museum.
- Gaius Laronius C. C. l. Annalis, named on a marble tablet at Florentia.
- Gaius Laronius C. C. l. Bassus, named on a marble tablet at Florentia.
- Gaius Laronius C. C. l. Menophilus, named on a marble tablet at Florentia.
- Gaius Laronius C. l. Orestes, named on a marble tablet at Florentia.
- Laronius Rufus, named on a fragment of a marble tablet from Rome, now in the Lateran Museum.
- Quintus Laronius Q. l. Salvius Cascelianus, named on a marble tablet from Rome, now in the public museum at Panormus.
- Laronia Q. l. Nice, named on a marble tablet from Rome, now in the public museum at Panormus.
- Laronia Q. f. Plias, named on a marble tablet found at Rome, now in the Lateran Museum.
- Quintus Laronius Dexster, named in a sepulchral inscription at Rome, together with Quintus Laronius Rufus.
- Quintus Laronius Rufus, named in a sepulchral inscription at Rome, together with Quintus Laronius Dexter.

== See also ==
- List of Roman gentes

== Bibliography ==
- Appianus Alexandrinus (Appian), Bellum Civile (The Civil War).
- Dictionary of Greek and Roman Biography and Mythology, William Smith, ed., Little, Brown and Company, Boston (1849).
- Theodor Mommsen et alii, Corpus Inscriptionum Latinarum (The Body of Latin Inscriptions, abbreviated "CIL"), Berlin-Brandenburgische Akademie der Wissenschaften (1853–present).
- T. Robert S. Broughton, The Magistrates of the Roman Republic, American Philological Association (1952).
