= Colonne (disambiguation) =

Colonne may refer to:

- Colonne, a commune in eastern France
- Concerts Colonne, a French symphony orchestra
- Édouard Colonne, a French conductor and violinist
- Cap Colonne, a cape in southern Italy
