= Quintus Laronius =

Quintus Laronius (fl. 1st century BC, Vibo Valentia, was a Roman military officer and Senator who was appointed suffect consul in 33 BC.

== Biography ==
Laronius was born in Vibo Valentia and was a novus homo or New Man and an Italian of non-Latin stock. He was a supporter of Caesar Octavianus during the period of the Second Triumvirate.

In 35 BC, he fought under Marcus Vipsanius Agrippa in the Sicilian campaign against Sextus Pompey. After Octavianus's fleet was defeated, Laronius was ordered to take three legions and relieve Lucius Cornificius at his camp at Messana. Laronius linked up with Cornificius at Mount Etna, who had managed to break out of his besieged camp, and escorted him to safety. It was probably during this campaign that Laronius took the title of Imperator, but he did not celebrate a triumph.

On October 1, 33 BC, Laronius was appointed suffect consul, replacing Gaius Fonteius Capito. He may also have been the Quintus Laronius who was appointed by the local senate of Vibo Valentia as one of the judicial quattuorviri quinquennales holding censorial power.

Many tiles stamped with his name were found at Lacinium and nearby showing that he had an involvement in the restoration of the Sanctuary of Hera Lacinia and in land ownership in the Croton area, a base for a brick and ceramic industry favoured by the presence of excellent clay quarries.

Political offices
Preceded by Gaius Fonteius Capito (suffect)	Suffect Consul of the Roman Republic; 33 BC with Licius Vinicius (suffect)	Succeeded by Gnaeus Domitius Ahenobarbus and Gaius Sosius
