= Aristophilides of Taras =

Italian-Greek politician

Aristophilides (Greek: Ἀριστοφιλίδης) was a ruler of the Greek colony of Taras (modern Taranto) in southern Italy during the late Archaic Period (c. 515 BC). He is mentioned by Herodotus, who refers to him with the title basileus ("king") of Taras. The nature of his authority has been the subject of scholarly debate.

== Historical context ==
Taras was founded as a Spartan colony in the late 8th century BC and developed into a major city in Magna Graecia. Its political institutions in the Archaic period are poorly understood. According to Herodotus, Aristophilides was in power when the Persians sent a naval expedition westward under Darius the Great in the late 6th century BC. After fitting out ships at Sidon, the Persians sailed along the coasts of Greece to observe harbors and prominent sites before moving further west. Eventually, the squadron reached Taras, where Aristophilides intervened.

Herodotus records that Aristophilides, the Tarentine basileus, disabled the Persian ships by removing their steering oars and confined the Persians in prison, alleging that they were spies. He did so out of favor to Democedes of Croton, a celebrated Greek physician then attempting to escape Persian custody. This allowed Democedes to slip away to his homeland. Afterwards, Aristophilides released the Persians and restored their ships.

== Interpretations of his rule ==
=== Tyranny ===
Some scholars have regarded Aristophilides as a tyrant, following the pattern of one-man rule that appeared in several Western Greek cities during the late Archaic period. This interpretation is predicated on the assumption that Herodotus occasionally used the terms terms tyrannos and basileus interchangeably, employing the later to describe an illegitimate monarch like Aristophilides would presumably be.

=== Kingship ===
However, Arther Ferrill has argued that Herodotus rarely applied the title basileus to Greek tyrants, reserving it instead for legitimate monarchs, and that his use of the term for Aristophilides may reflect a favorable source tradition rather than a neutral synonym for tyrant. Massimo Nafissi likewise observed that the possibility of Taras having "traditional basileis – as Sparta, Thera and Cyrene did – cannot be disproved." Nafissi went on to suggest that suggesting that Aristophilides may have been a king whose powers were consistent with a recognized politeia as defined by Aristotle. Nafissi postulated that the cults of Aphrodite Basilis and the Dioscuri in Taras carried royal connotations.

=== Chief magistrate ===
Alternatively, the title basileus in Taras may not have indicated kingship in the strict sense but rather the office of a chief magistrate within a republican framework. In Classical Antiquity, but particularly in Archaic Greece, the title basileus could denote chief magistrates of a city in addition to sovereign monarchs. It has been suggested that Aristophilides may have been referred to in the former sense rather than the latter.
