= Capo Colonne =

Capo Colonne ("Cape of Columns") may refer to:

- Promunturium Lacinium, Calabria
- Sounion, Attica
