= Philippus of Croton =

Philippus, son of Butacides (fl. 6th century BC) was a citizen of Croton, Magna Graecia. Having married the daughter of Telys, king of the rival state of Sybaris, and being obliged in consequence to leave his country, he sailed away to Cyrene; and, when Dorieus, the Spartan prince, son of Anaxandridas II, set forth from the Libyan coast, on his Sicilian expedition, Philippus accompanied him with a galley, equipped and manned at his own expense, and was slain in Sicily in a battle between Carthaginians and Egestaeans. He was the finest man of his time, and a conqueror at Olympia; by virtue of which qualifications the Egestaeans worshipped him after his death as a hero.

== See also ==
- Greek hero cult
