= Temple of Juno Lacinia (Crotone) =

Ancient Greek temple

Coordinates: 39°01′36″N 17°12′19″E

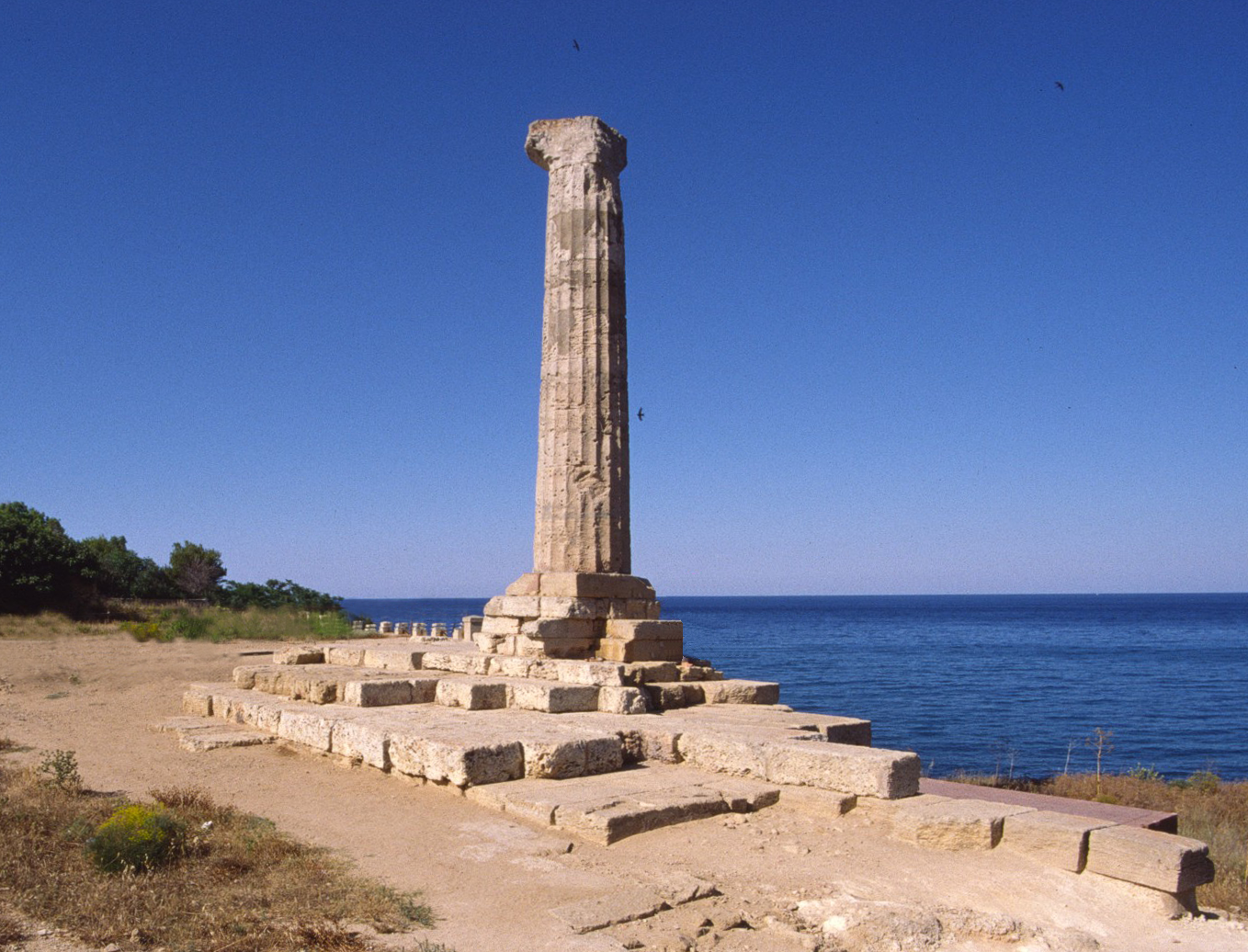
The ruins of the Temple of Hera Lacinia

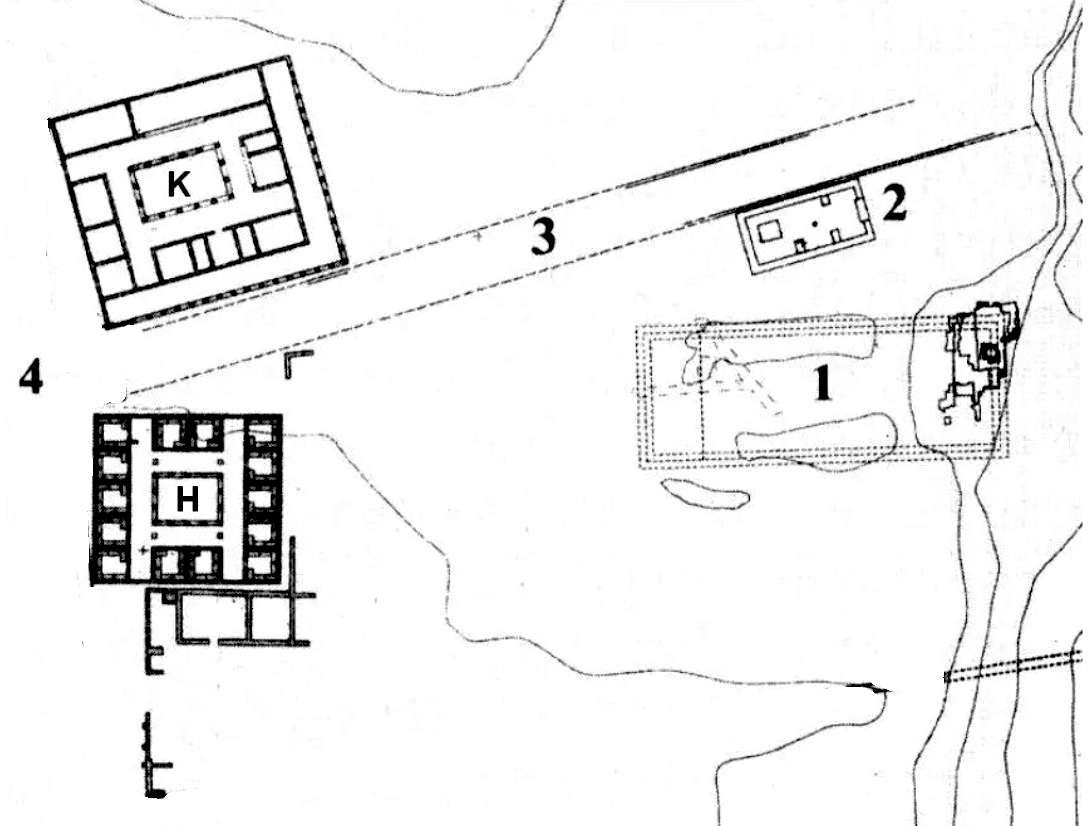
Sanctuary of Hera Lacinia 1:temple 2:Building B 3:Via Sacra H:hestiatorion K:katagoghion

The Temple of Juno Lacinia (as a Roman goddess, originally Hera Lacinia) is a ruined ancient Greek temple at the heart of a sanctuary dedicated to Hera located on Capo Colonna in Calabria, Italy, near Crotone (ancient Kroton). The main remaining feature is a Doric column with capital, about 27 feet (8.2 m) in height.

The site lies on a promontory formerly called Lacinion in a strategic position along the coastal routes linking Taranto to the Strait of Messina. The venerated goddess, Hera Lacinia, was named after the location.

The sanctuary was later included in the larger Roman town of Lacinium.

== History ==
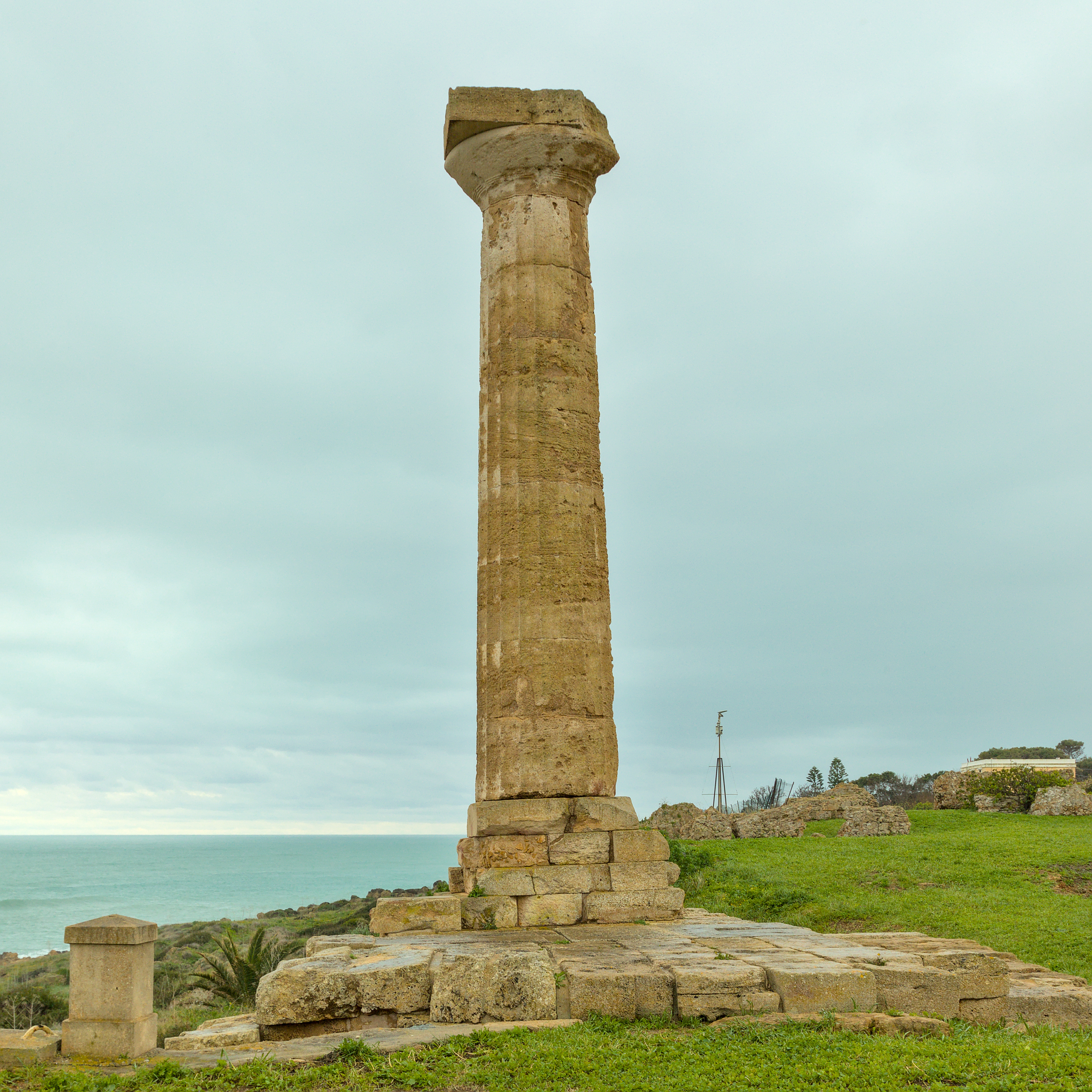
The remaining column

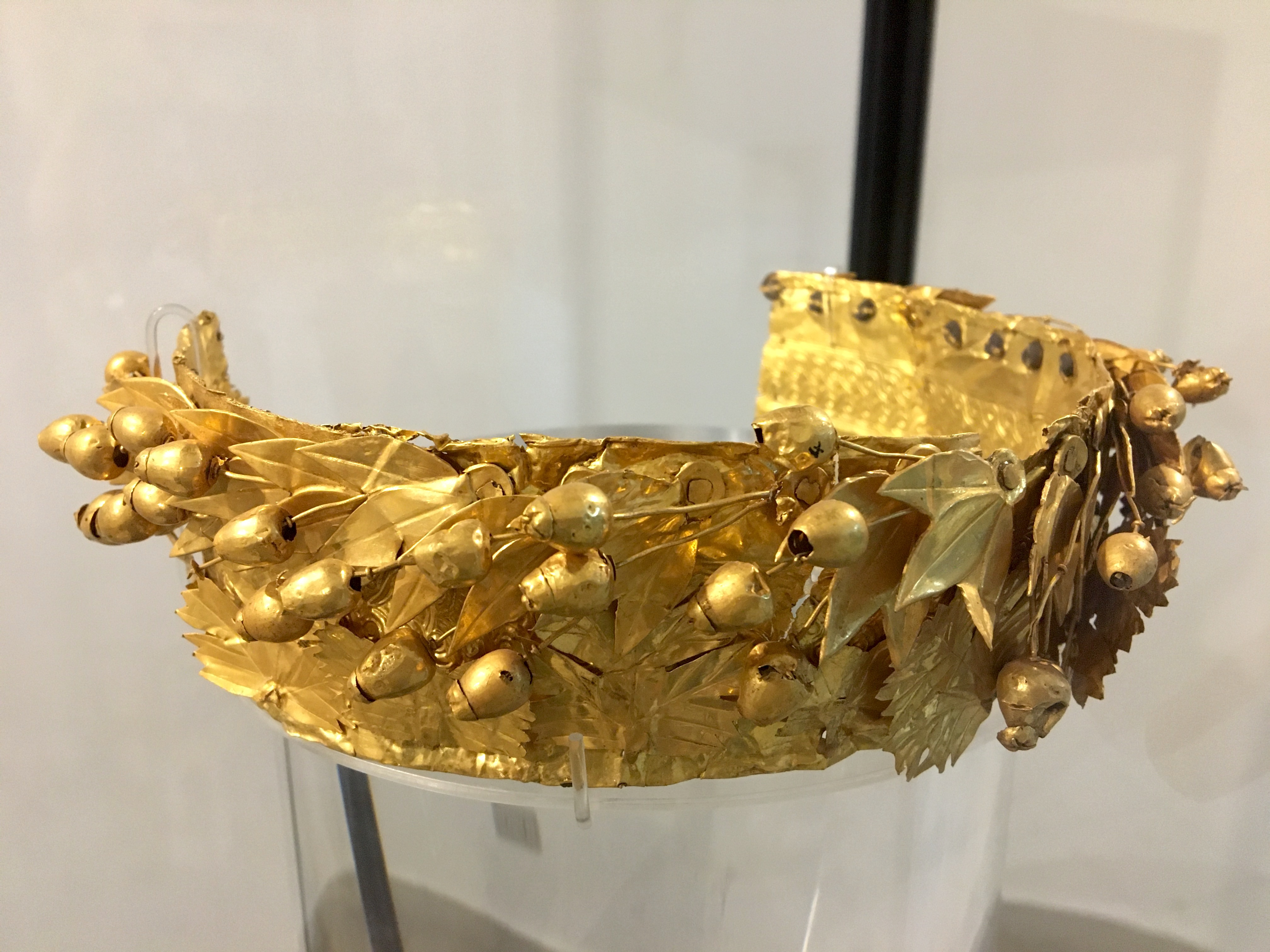
Diadem (550-500 BC) from Building B

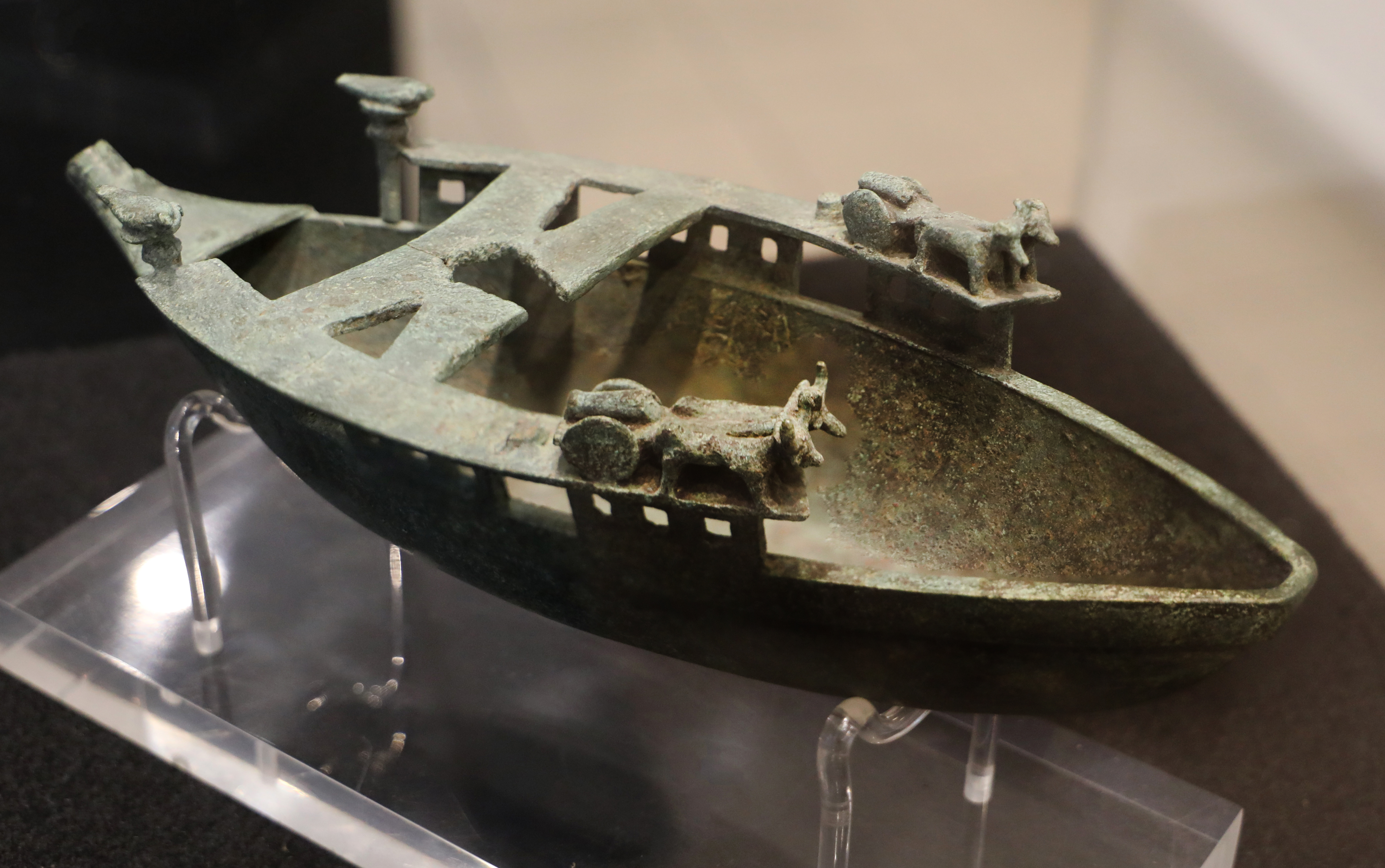
Nuragic boat from Building B, 900-790 BC

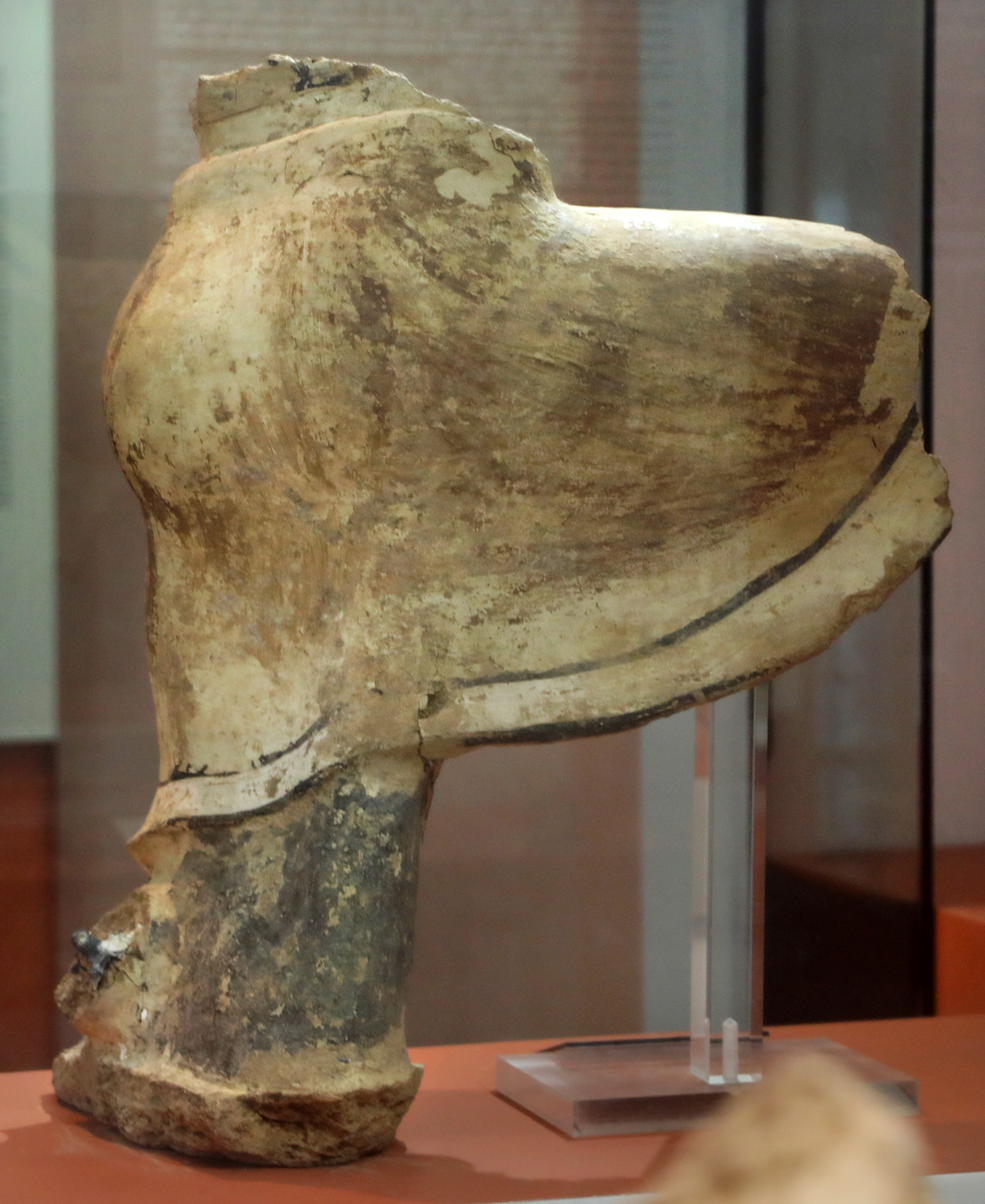
Acroterion of winged gorgon, 540-530 BC, from the temple

The oldest (imported) ceramic finds from the 8th century suggest that the area of the Lacinio promontory was a place of worship even before the arrival of the Greek colonists, but are not significant for evidence of Greek visits prior to the colonial phase. These finds from the first cult area were below "Building B" which dates from the early 6th century BC as testified by the rich votive offerings including masterpieces in gold, silver and bronze. The most important building of the sanctuary later became the large Doric temple (A), built on a different alignment near the edge of the cliff around 480-470 BC on top of a previous archaic temple from the 7th century.

The sanctuary was dependent on ancient Kroton and was one of the most important in Magna Graecia until the 4th century BC. Building phases are datable to eras from the 6th century BC to the 3rd century AD.

The via sacra (great processional way), 60 m long and over 8 m wide, was created in the 4th century BC after which two vast public buildings for pilgrims were built. They had symmetrical plans with internal courtyards and peristyles: the katagogion (hotel for pilgrims) and the hestiatorion (banquet building). The wall of the temenos (sanctuary precinct) probably dates to the 4th century BC.

The federal treasury of the Italiote League, which brought together all the Greeks of the West, was moved there in the 5th century BC, and remained there until relocated to Herakleia near Tarentum.

The famous painter Zeuxis created many paintings for the Temple in the late 5th c. BC some of which had been preserved till Cicero's (106-43 BC) day. His most famous painting there was of Helen of Troy intended to depict the ideal female beauty. The painting was later brought to Ambracia by Pyrrhus of Epirus (318-272 BC) after the Pyrrhic War. When the Romans captured Ambracia in 189 BC they brought it to Rome where Pliny the Elder saw it in the Portico of Philip.

Hannibal had his final camp nearby before evacuating Italy in 206 BC, staying there three winters toward the close of the Second Punic War, and dedicated a bronze plaque inscribed in Punic and Greek there detailing his accomplishments.

Cicero cites Coelius Antipater saying that the temple featured a golden column. Hannibal wanted to know whether or not it was solid gold, and drilled a hole and, determining that it was solid, decided to take it back to Carthage. The next night Juno appeared to him in a dream and threatened him with the loss of his remaining good eye if he took it. Hannibal obeyed the warning; he had a small statue of a heifer, sacred to Juno, cast from the drill shavings and mounted it on top of the column.

=== Roman era ===
In 173 BC after the Romans' establishment of the colony nearby, the Censor Quintus Fulvius Flaccus stripped the marble tiles from the roof of the Temple of Hera and used them for the Temple of Fortuna Equestris in Rome, which he had dedicated. The Senate ordered the tiles returned, but, "as there was no one who understood how to replace the tiles they were left in the precinct of the temple." In 172 BC, out of grief over tragic news about his sons, Flaccus hanged himself. "[T]here was a general belief that he had been driven mad by Juno Lacinia, in her anger at his spoliation of her temple."

Further looting occurred during the 1st century, probably between 72 and 71 BC, by Cilician and Cretan pirates. The temple must have remained active and full of offerings for a few decades until 36 BC when the Roman colony was besieged and the temple plundered by Sextus Pompey fleeing from Sicily.

Between the late republican and imperial ages, restoration was probably done at least on the roof of the temple with marble elements (e.g. the sima with lion's head) and over the area of the sanctuary are tiles stamped with the name of Q. Laronius, Agrippa's legate who was rewarded with the consulate in 33 BC.

The continuation of devotion to Hera Lacinia in the imperial age between 98 and 105 AD is attested by the altar dedicated by Oecius imperial procurator (libertus procurator), in favour of Ulpia Marciana, sister of Trajan.

The temple was said to have been still been fairly complete in the 16th century, but was destroyed to build the episcopal palace at Crotone. One of the two remaining columns fell in an earthquake in 1638.

== Description ==
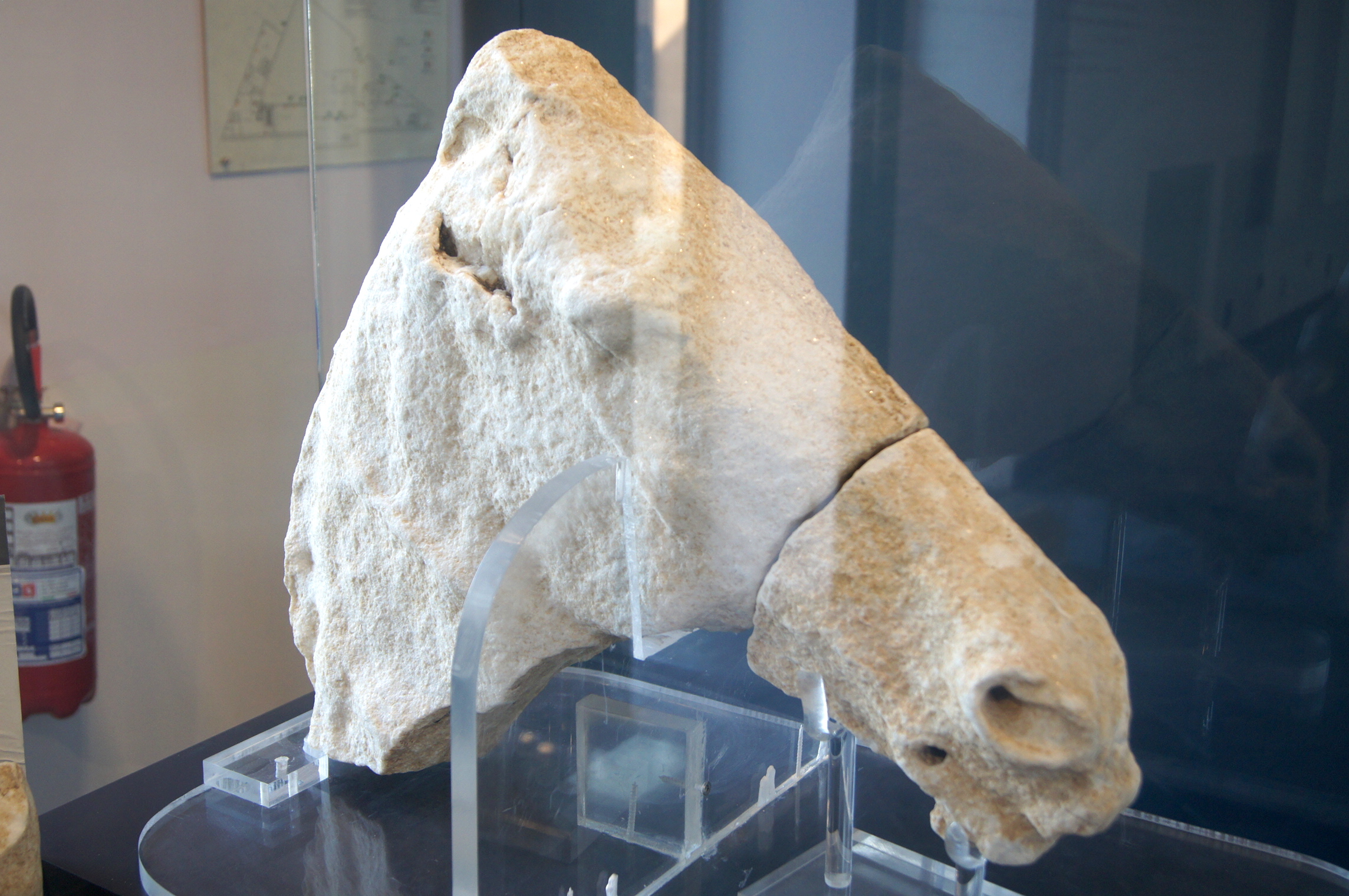
Sculpture from the temple

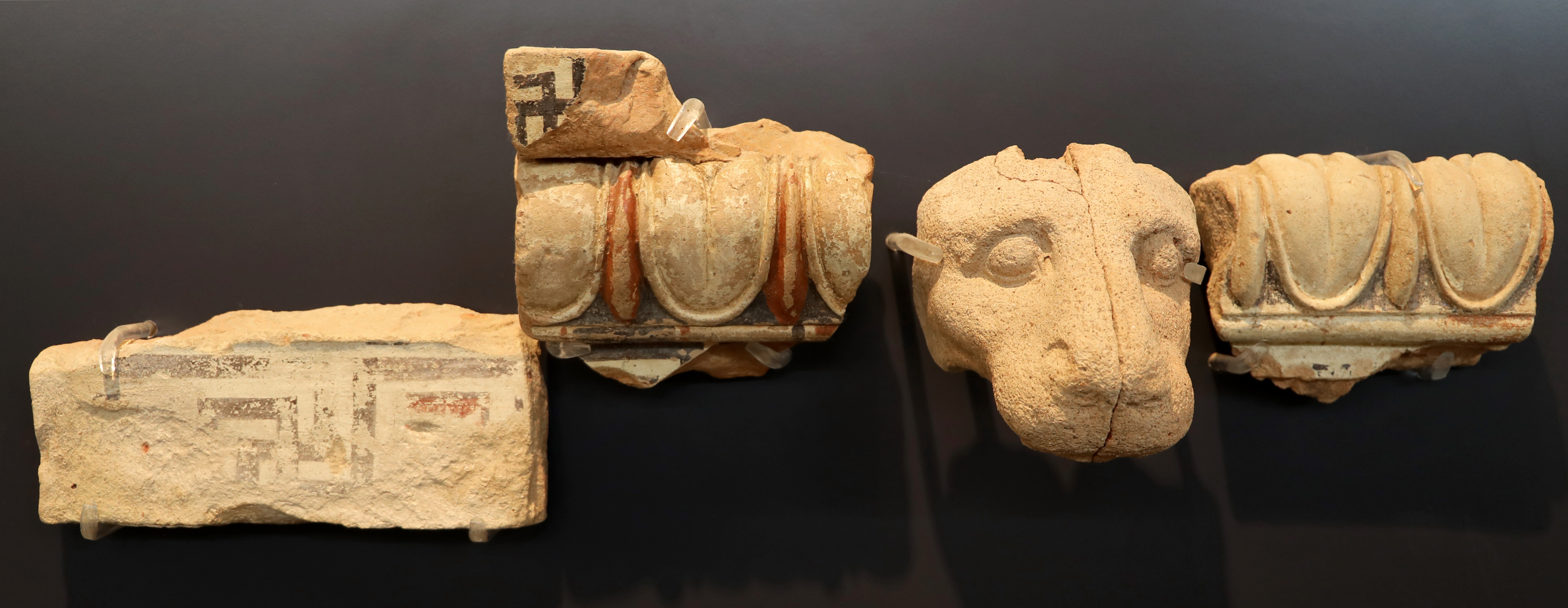
Terrecotta architectonic items from the temple

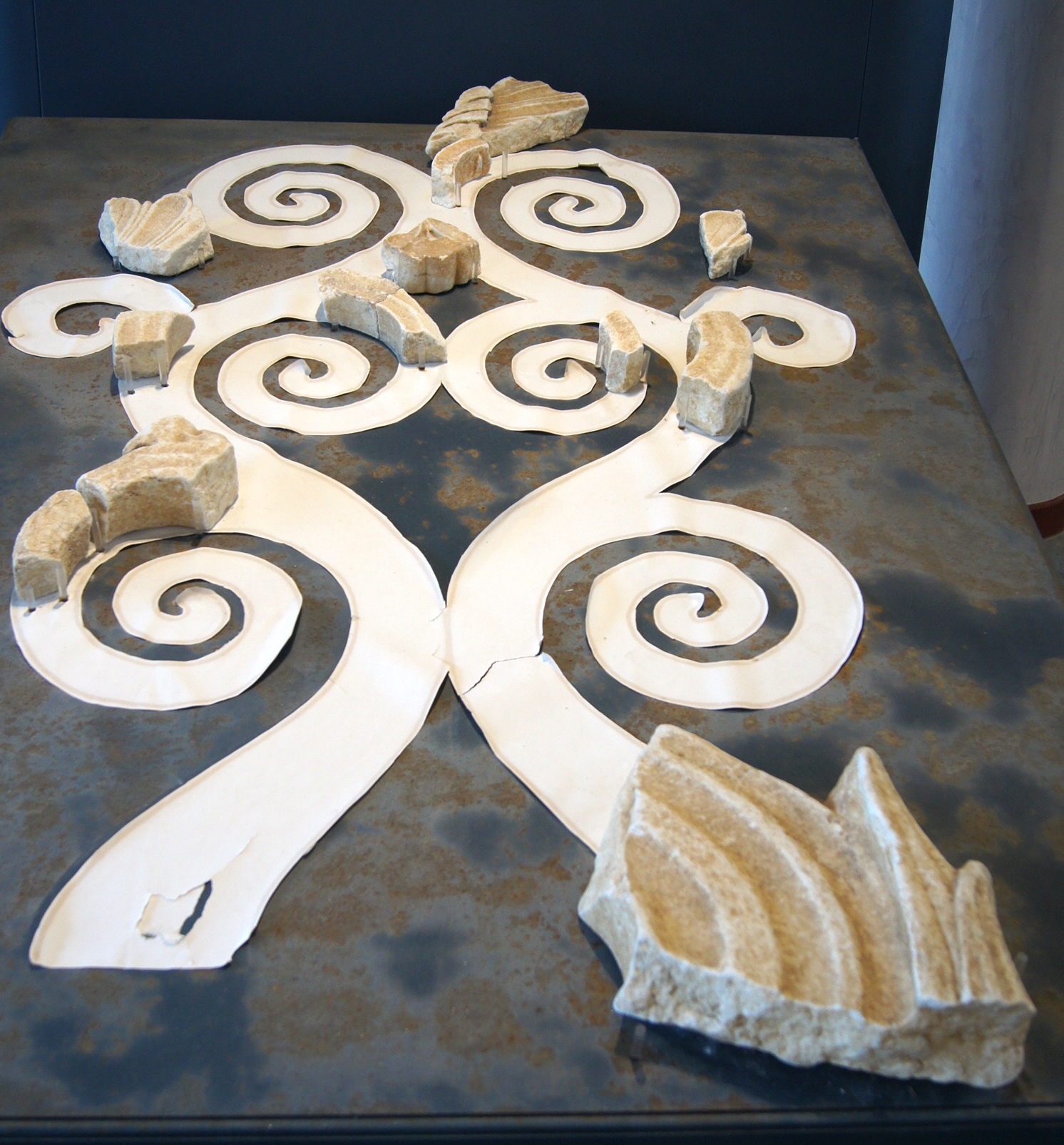
Roof acroterion from the temple

The temple has been described as "perhaps the most splendid [structure] in southern Italy".

The sanctuary was in an area of forest (lucus)) sacred to the goddess. Hera is, in Greek mythology, the greatest of the goddesses, mother of Zeus and of other deities and heroes, and also the greatest protector of women and of all aspects of female life, but she is also venerated as Mother Nature, protector of animals and of sea travel. Hera also protected in particular the cattle which grazed freely within the forest.

The Doric temple had six columns in front (hexastyle) with a total of 48 columns over 8 m tall. The remaining column rests on the remains of the mighty stylobate. The roof was covered with Parian marble tiles. Architectural fragments found show the colourful terracotta detailing used.

The grand sacred way connected the sanctuary with the sacred forest and the coastal landing points. It must have also continued further eastwards and ended in a sort of square, where the religious processions that wound their way around this majestic artery converged and where, perhaps, was the altar mentioned in the sources but the strong erosion of the edge of the promontory must have destroyed this part.

The sanctuary includes at least three other buildings: "B”, "H” and "K”.

=== Building B ===
This building could well have been the first temple, later replaced by the more visible classical temple. Its proportions, the several renovations it underwent in a short period and its proximity to the later temple show its considerable importance as the first place of worship in the sanctuary.

It was discovered in 1987 and is a large building with a rectangular plan (approximately 22 x 9 m) oriented at an angle to the later temple. The building, of which the foundation rows remain, made extensive use of calcarenite available directly on the promontory, crushed into small flakes on the northern side of the building.

Recent excavations discovered gorgeous gold, silver and bronze votive offerings to the goddess. These included masterpieces, including a gold diadem that may have crowned the idol of the goddess. The splendid bronze ornaments (a Siren, a Sphinx and a Gorgon) were made under the influence of the great bronze-working schools of Greece. The so-called Orientalizing Movement (7th c. BC) is also reflected in Building B by objects like scarabs and ostrich eggs of Eastern origin. There is evidence of trade with the Lucanian interior and the routes to Campania, Latium and Etruria which brought objects from other regions such as the unique nuragic boat.

The sacredness of the building is attested not only by the finds but also by the presence of a sacred boundary stone (horos) on its southern side. There were at least three major building phases: the first, of the northern wall, dates to the beginning of the 6th century BC. The elevation of the building was most likely made of mud bricks and the roof perhaps made of straw and wood. In the early 5th century BC a massive reconstruction of three sides of the building used squared calcarenite blocks. The square base at the centre of the building was placed in a slightly eccentric position to respect a previous sacred structure represented by three Doric column discs. This base could have been the sumptuous support of the cult statue, or a large table of offerings dedicated to Hera, as attested by the numerous votive offerings nearby. The entrance on the eastern side of was also created.

The third phase in the first twenty-five years of the 5th century BC involved the conspicuous reuse of material from a monumental construction. The southern wall was doubled against which four parallelepiped blocks were placed, characterised by squared and carefully cut anathyroseis (undercut chiselled bands along the edges of the blocks).

The building had a short duration, its destruction being dated to the mid-5th century BC.

=== The Hestiatorion ===
Along the southern side of the Via Sacra stands the hestiatorion, a building for sacred banquets on the same axis as the large Doric temple. Another example in the region is the extramural sanctuary of Aphrodite in Locri (so-called U-shaped Stoa in the Centocamere area, of the 6th century BC). It had an almost square plan (26.3 x 29 m) and consists of a porticoed courtyard overlooked by 14 rooms, also square in plan (4.7 x 4.7 m), arranged symmetrically in two series of 5 and 2 rooms. The discovery of furnishings typical of rooms dedicated to meals implies that this was the banqueting or canteen and refreshment building for important travellers as well as priests. It dates from the 4th century BC when the temple had already achieved great celebrity. The rooms for the klinai (couches used not only for rest but also for eating meals) would contain 7 of them with a total of 98 klinai. Other rooms were for kitchens, warehouses, etc..

The term "sacred banquets" refers to collective ritual meals, an aspect of worship widely practiced in the Greek Geometric and Archaic Ages. Collective ritual ceremonies were a corollary of sacrificies and aimed at establishing relationships between the human community and the divine referent, and also between the individuals of the community, as a complex cultic action underlying an elaborate political-social operation. In the classical age the ritual banquet was usually hosted in hestiatoria between the end of the 6th and 5th centuries. The use of the hestiatioron and the forms of participation in the ritual banquet changed in the Hellenistic age with the shift of the centres of power, from the city-states to the kingdoms: the monarchies no longer needed the consolidation and periodic affirmation of the city's identity in the sanctuaries.

=== The Katagogion ===
Along the north side of the Sacred Way is the katagogion, a hotel for privileged guests, dating from the second half of the 4th century BC, perhaps used to host delegations for meetings of the Achaean league, while their servants had to settle for much less refined buildings.

It overlooked the sacred way with a Doric portico which also continued along the L-shaped east side. Access was via a corridor, directly into the stoa or peristyle which overlooked by square rooms (5.1×5.1 m) on all four sides. The nearest comparison is with the Leonidaion of Olympia used as a hotel for delegations for the Olympic Games.

=== Other Buildings ===
Some decorative terracottas and a dedicatory inscription to Hera of the 6th century BC, in private possession at Crotone, were described in Notizie degli scavi 1876.

== See also ==
- List of Ancient Greek temples

== Bibliography ==
- R. Koldewey and O. Puchstein, Die griechischen Tempel in Unteritalien und Sicilien (Berlin 1899, 41).
