= Cylon of Croton =

Opponent of the philosopher Pythagoras

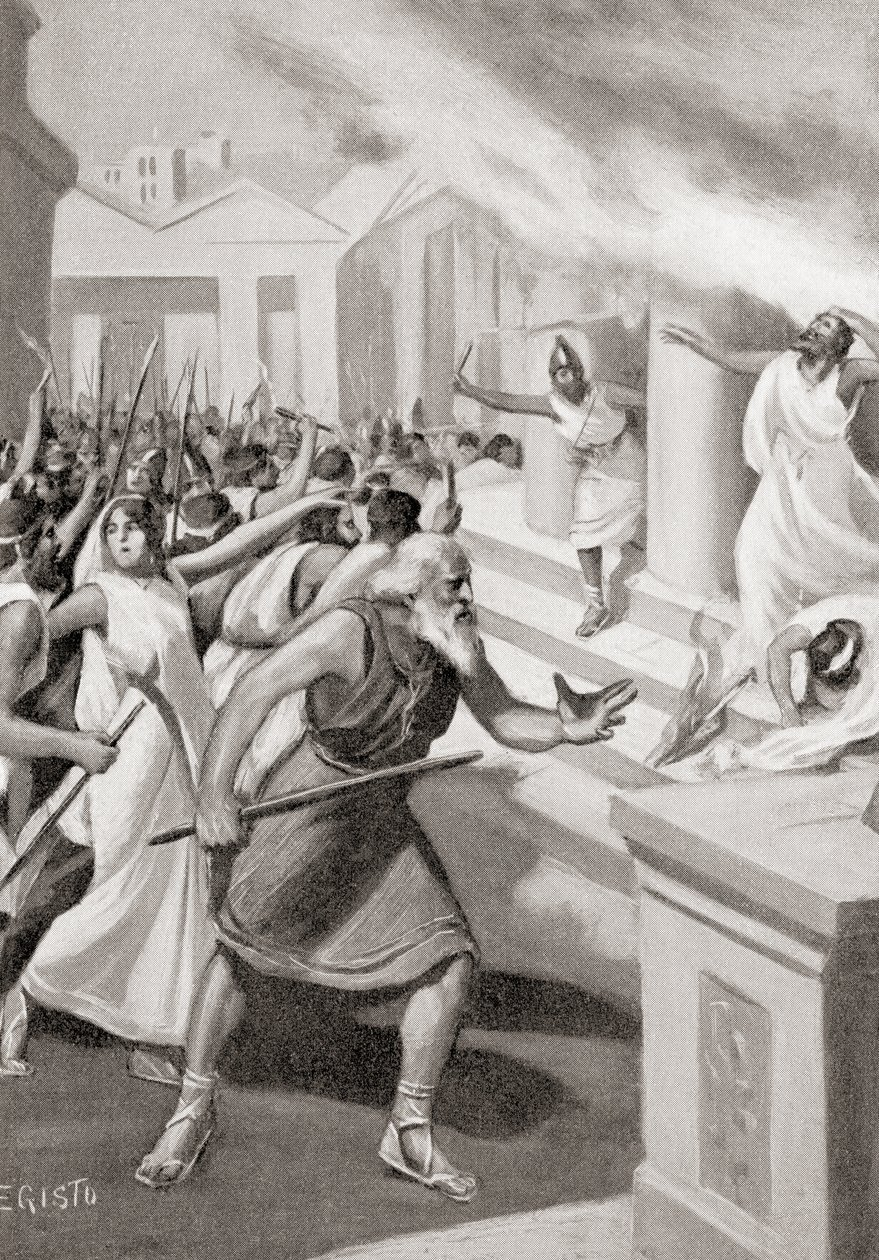
Cylon of Croton leads the revolt against the Pythagoreans, as envisaged by Egisto c. 1910

Cylon of Croton (Ancient Greek: Κυλώνειο) was a leading citizen of Croton, Magna Graecia, who led a revolt against the Pythagoreans, probably around 509 BC. According to Iamblichus' De Vita Pythagorae, Cylon had previously tried and failed to be accepted into the Pythagorean order (VP 248). In the climactic moment of the revolt, a meeting house was set on fire as the Pythagoreans were debating inside - according, again, to Iamblichus (VP 249). After the success of the rebellion, all debts owed were eliminated and property was seized for redistribution. The rebellion may have resulted in Pythagoras expulsion from Croton.
