= Calliphon of Croton =

Ancient Greek physician

Calliphon of Croton (Ancient Greek: Καλλιφῶν) (fl. 6th century BC), Magna Graecia, was a Pythagorean physician. He was apparently the chief priest at Croton and a man of great importance in civic affairs. Hermippus reports that he was an associate of Pythagoras, and he appears in Iamblichus's catalogue of Pythagoreans; thus he is one of the few Pythagoreans who can be dated from the time of Pythagoras. Josephus quotes Hermippus as saying that Pythagoras claimed that the soul of Calliphon of Croton used to remain at his side night and day, and that he used to utter the following advice: not to pass over a place where his donkey had stumbled, to drink only of clear fountain water, and to speak ill of no man. Herodotus, in telling the story of the physician Democedes of Croton, reports that Democedes was the son of Calliphon.
