= Phayllos of Croton =

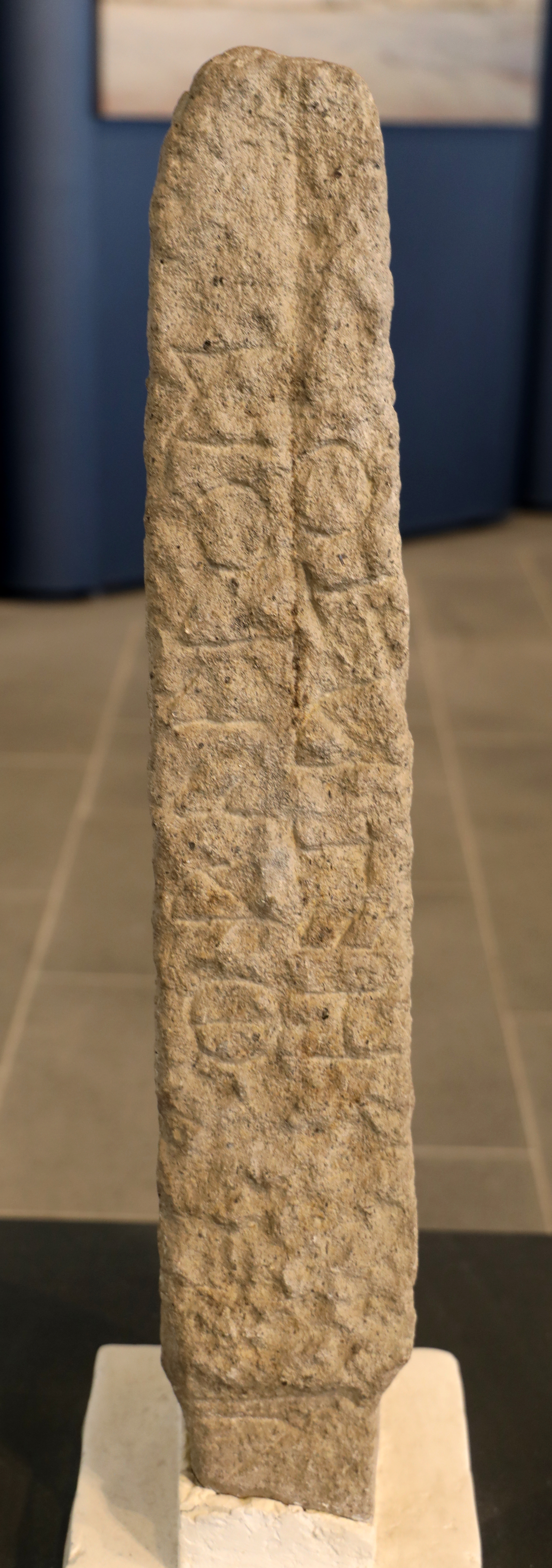
Phayllos of Croton inscription

Phayllos of Croton (Greek: Φάϋλλος) was an ancient Greek athlete and a naval commander from Croton in southern Italy, who outfitted and commanded a ship at the Battle of Salamis.

== Life ==
Phayllos won three victories in the Pythian Games, two of them in the pentathlon.

In 480 BC, Phyallos outfitted a ship and commanded it in the Battle of Salamis, the only one from the Italian coast, and received praise for his exploits by Herodotus.

== Culture and honors ==
Phayllos is used by Aristophanes as an example of long ago swiftness in his plays.

Plurarch wrote that Alexander the Great sent part of the spoils of the Battle of Gaugamela to Croton in Phayllos's honor.

An inscription at the base of a statue of Phayllos at the Acropolis of Athens reads: "Phayllos was admired by all. For he was thrice victor in the games at Delphi, and captured ships which Asia sent forth."
