= Democedes =

Ancient Greek physician

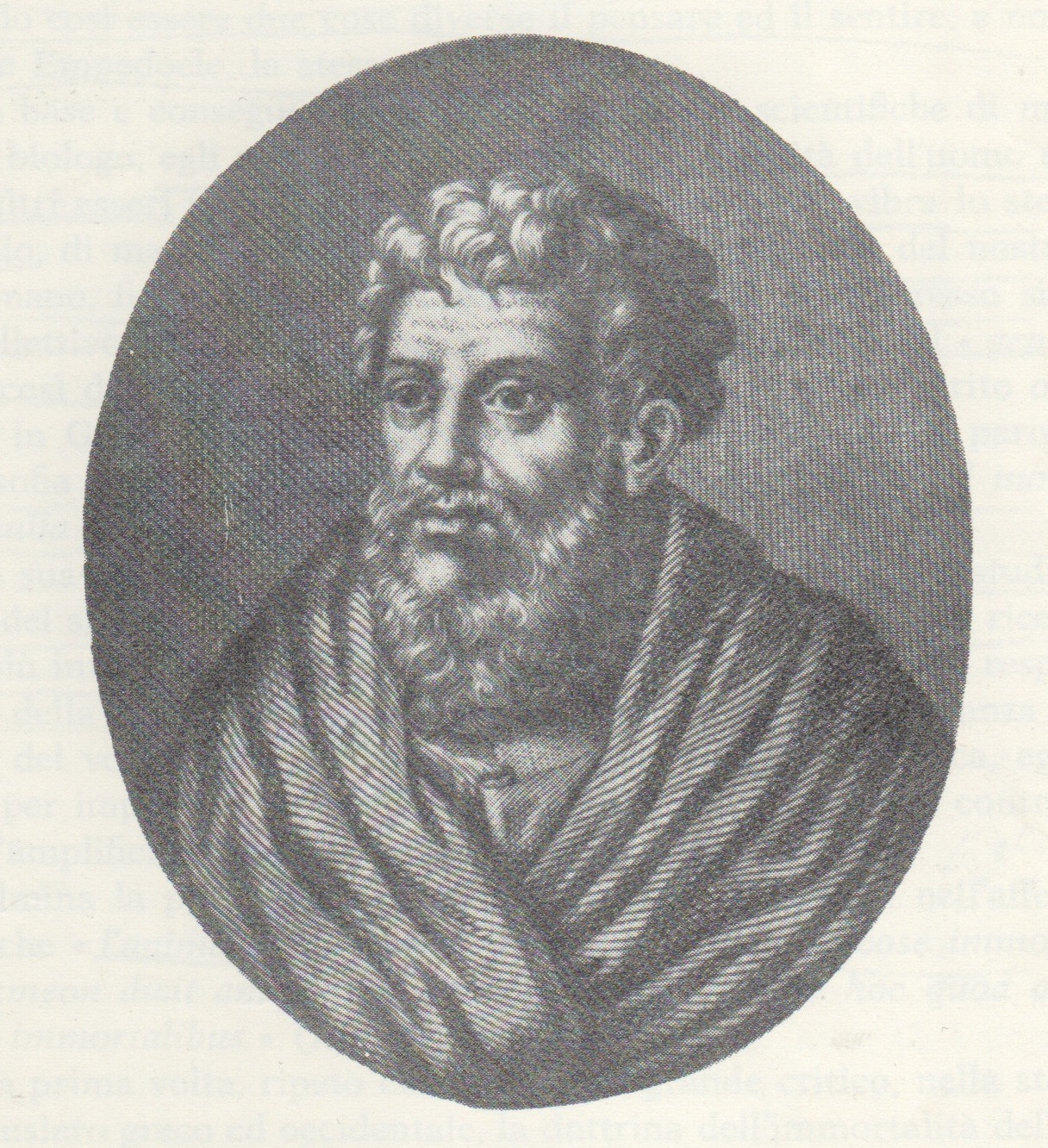

Democedes of Croton (/ˌdɛmoʊˈsiːdiːz/; Greek: Δημοκήδης), described in The Histories of Herodotus as "the most skillful physician of his time".

== Democedes's background ==
Democedes was a Greek physician and a member of the court of Darius I. He was born in Croton, in Magna Graecia. His father was Calliphon, a priest and physician at Croton at the time of Pythagoras. His first position as physician seems to be in civil service of Athens and Aegina. Later he entered service under Polycrates. In 522 B.C., Polycrates, his entourage, and Democedes were all captured as Lydians by Oroetes and sent to Susa.

== Democedes's travels ==
Herodotus describes the journeys of Democedes with much detail.

=== Services rendered to Darius and Atossa ===
Darius once sprained his ankle while he was hunting, and his Egyptian doctors could not help his ankle. However, Democedes was able to heal his ankle, and he was thereafter given great esteem. The court regarded his actions highly enough that he was able to eat in the presence of the king. He was the first of many Greek physicians to be within the Persian court. He lived in what the Persians regarded as luxury. Nevertheless, he always wanted to go back to his homeland, Greece. Later on, Darius's wife, Atossa, had a breast ulcer. Democedes's interaction with Atossa represents the first recorded diagnosis and treatment of inflammatory mastitis. When Democedes cured her, as a reward, he was set free and allowed to visit Greece.

=== Escape ===
According to Herodotus, Democedes was sent west as part of a Persian reconnaissance mission organized under Darius I. The Persians, having manned two triremes and a large merchant vessel at Sidon, sailed along the coasts of Greece to record harbors and strategic sites before moving further west. Fifteen Persian nobles accompanied the mission. Democedes traveled with them as a passenger, still in Persian custody, but seeking an opportunity to return to his homeland in Magna Graecia.

When the expedition reached Taras (modern Taranto), Democedes found assistance from the local ruler Aristophilides, whom Herodotus describes as basileus of the Tarentines. Out of goodwill toward Democedes, Aristophilides disabled the Persian ships by removing their oars and briefly imprisoned the Persians on charges of espionage. This allowed Democedes to escape from Persian supervision and make his way inland to Croton, his native city. Once Democedes had reached safety, Aristophilides released the Persians and restored their ships and equipment, enabling them to continue their reconnaissance mission.

Back in Croton, Democedes was sheltered from Persian reprisals. He later married the daughter of the famous wrestler Milo of Croton.

== Sources ==
- The Histories of Herodotus
