= Alessandro Riolo =

Italian footballer (born 1978)

Personal information
- Date of birth: November 16, 1978 (age 47)
- Place of birth: Crotone, Italy
- Height: 1.78 m (5 ft 10 in)
- Position: Midfielder

Senior career*
| Years | Team | Apps | (Gls) |
| 2000–2007 | Rende | 89 | (9) |
| 2007–2008 | Cisco Roma | 15 | (0) |
| 2008 | Vibonese | 14 | (1) |
| 2013–2014 | Cutro | | |
| 2015–2016 | Corigliano Calabro | | |
| 2016–2020 | Cotronei | | |
| 2018 | → Caccurese (loan) | | |
| 2021–2022 | Silana | | |
- * Club domestic league appearances and goals

Alessandro Riolo (born 16 November 1978) is an Italian former footballer who played as an offensive midfielder for Italian Promozione teams A.S. Cutro, Rende Calcio, Cisco Roma and U.S. Vibonese Calcio.
