= Aristomachus of Croton =

3rd-century BC Greek politician

Aristomachus (or Aristomachos) was an ancient Greek leader of the popular party at Croton in the Second Punic War, about 215 BC.

At that time nearly all the towns of Magna Graecia were divided into two parties, the people being in favour of the Carthaginians, and the nobles or senators in favour of the Romans. The Bruttians, who were in alliance with the Carthaginians, had hoped to gain possession of Croton with their assistance. As this had not been done, they determined to make the conquest by themselves. A deserter from Croton informed them of the state of political parties there, and that Aristomachus was ready to surrender the town to them. The Bruttians marched with an army against Croton, and as the lower parts, which were inhabited by the people, were open and easy of access, they soon gained possession of them. Aristomachus, however, as if he had nothing to do with the Bruttians, withdrew to the arx, where the nobles were assembled and defended themselves. The Bruttians in conjunction with the people of Croton besieged the nobles in the arx, and when they found that they made no impression, they applied to Hanno the Elder for Carthaginian assistance. He proposed to the Crotoniats to receive the Bruttians as colonists within the extensive but deserted walls of their city. But all the Crotoniats, with the exception of Aristomachus, declared that they would rather die than submit to this. As Aristomachus, who had betrayed the town, was unable to betray the arx also, he saw no way but to take to flight, and he accordingly went over to Hanno. The Crotoniats soon after quitted their town altogether and migrated to Locri.
