= Capo Colonne Lighthouse =

Lighthouse in Calabria, Italy

Capo Colonne
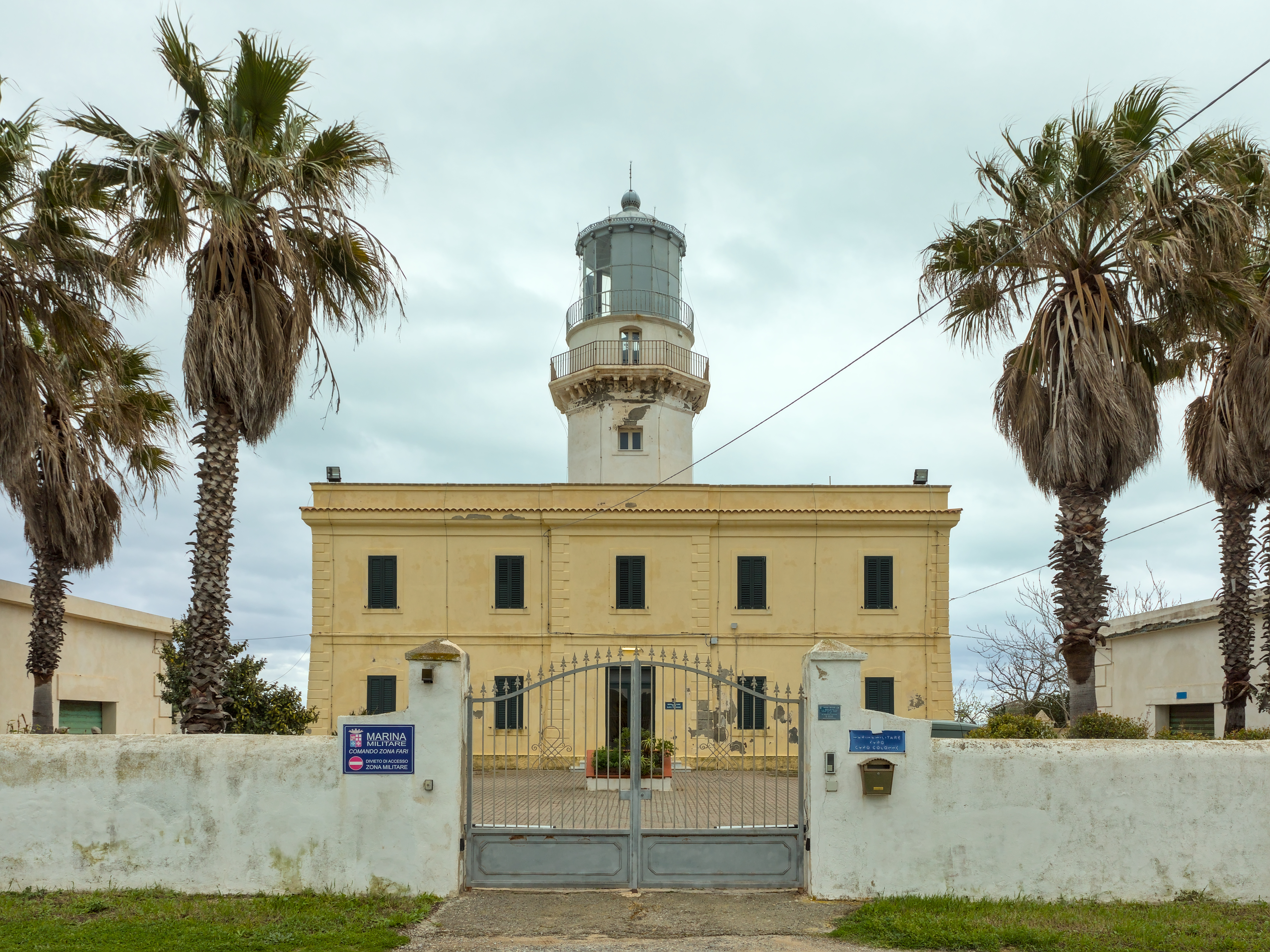
- Capo Colonne Lighthouse
- Location: Crotone; Calabria; Italy
- Coordinates: 39°01′32″N 17°12′16″E

Tower
- Constructed: 1873
- Construction: masonry tower
- Height: 22 metres (72 ft)
- Shape: octagonal tower with balcony and lantern attached to a two-story keeper’ house
- Markings: white tower, grey lantern dome
- Power source: mains electricity
- Operator: Marina Militare

Light
- Focal height: 40 metres (130 ft)
- Lens: Type OR 500; Focal length: 250mm
- Range: main: 24 nautical miles (44 km; 28 mi) reserve: 18 nautical miles (33 km; 21 mi)
- Characteristic: FI W 5s.
- Italy no.: 3404 E.F.

Capo Colonne Lighthouse (Italian: Faro di Capo Colonna) is situated on the extremity of the Promunturium Lacinium, nearby the single column of the Greek temple elevated in honour of Hera Lacinia, at 9 kilometres (5.6 mi) from Crotone on the Ionian Sea.

== Description ==
The lighthouse was completed in 1873 and consist of a two-story building with the octagonal tower, 22 metres (72 ft) high, on it. In 2002 the lighthouse was restored and in 2012 modernized. The type of signalling is a rotating optical OR S3, the light has a focal length of 500 and emits a single white flashing in 5 seconds period visible up to 24 nautical miles (44 km; 28 mi).

== See also ==
- List of lighthouses in Italy
