= Crotone =

- Comune
- Comune di Crotone
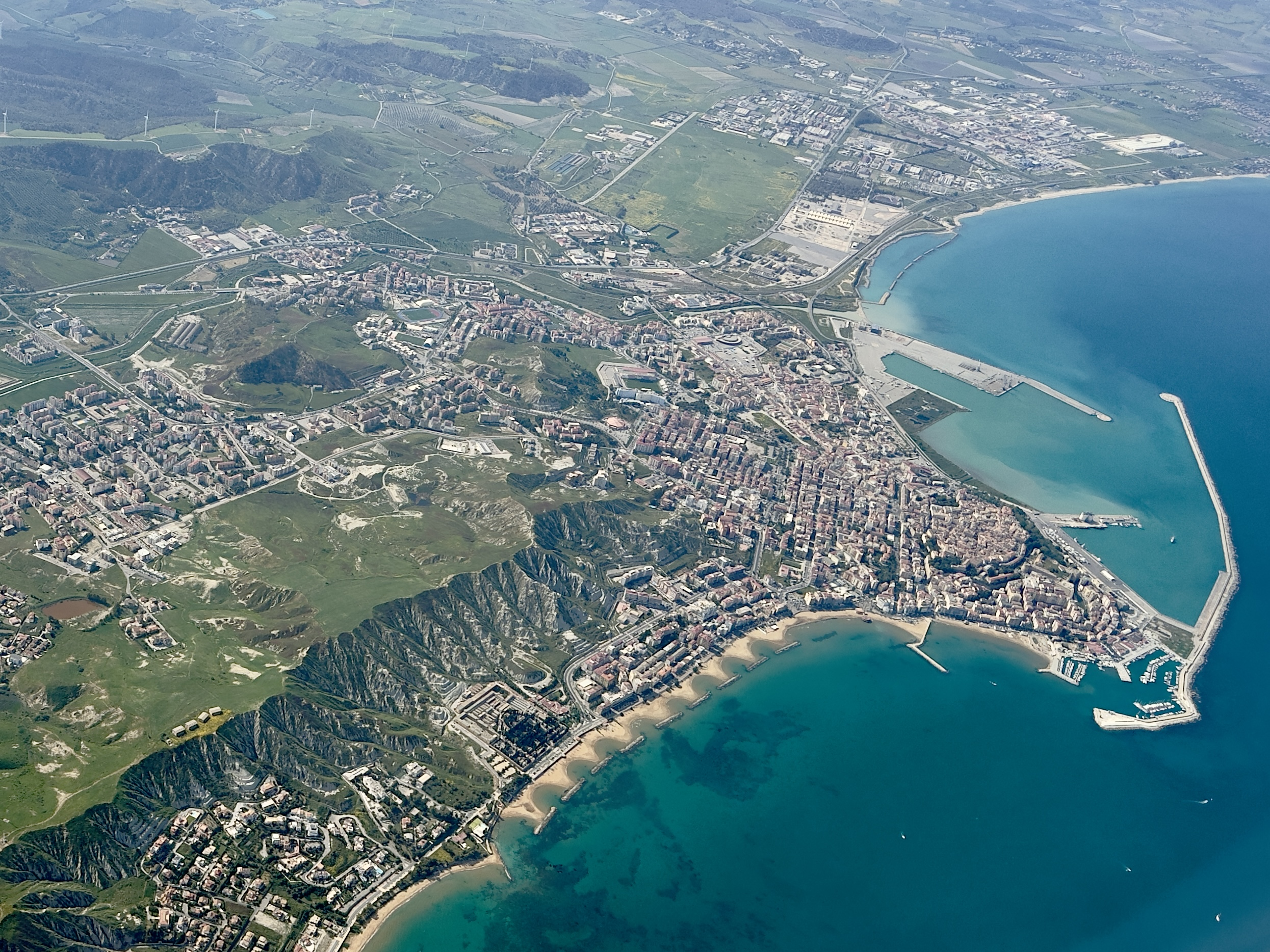

- Coat of arms

- Location within Italy Location within Calabria
- Coordinates: 39°05′N 17°07′E
- Country: Italy
- Region: Calabria
- Province: Crotone (KR)
- Frazioni: Papanice, Apriglianello, Carpentieri, Cipolla, Farina, Gabella Grande, Iannello, Maiorano, Margherita

Government
  - Mayor: Vincenzo Voce

Area
  - Total: 179.8 km^{2} (69.4 sq mi)
- Elevation: 8 m (26 ft)

Population (2018-01-01)
  - Total: 63,941
  - Density: 355.6/km^{2} (921.1/sq mi)
- Time zone: UTC+1 (CET)
  - Summer (DST): UTC+2 (CEST)
- Postal code: 88900
- Dialing code: 0962
- Patron saint: Dionysius the Areopagite
- Saint day: October 9
- Website: Official website

Crotone (/kroʊˈtoʊneɪ, krəˈ-/; Italian: [kroˈtoːne]; Crotonese: Cutrone or Cutruni) is a city and comune in Calabria, Italy.

Founded c. 710 BC as the Achaean colony of Croton/Kroton (Ancient Greek: Κρότων or Ϙρότων; Latin: Crotona), it became a great Greek city, home of the renowned mathematician-philosopher Pythagoras amongst other famous citizens, and one of the most important centres of Magna Graecia.

It was known as Cotrone from the Middle Ages until 1928, when its name was changed to the current one. In 1992, it became the capital of the newly established Province of Crotone.

== History ==
The promontory of Kroton was inhabited by indigenous populations, perhaps Oenotrians and Japigi, in the Bronze Age and early Iron Age.

=== Foundation ===
Kroton's oikistes (founder) was Myscellus, from the city of Rhypes in Achaea in the northern Peloponnese, after consulting the Delphic Oracle who announced:

Cross the vast sea and next to the Esaro (river) you will found Kroton.

The Achaeans were motivated, like others of the Greek colonisation, by the lack of cultivatable land in their mountainous region and by population pressure.

Although the Greek foundation of Kroton was thought to be 710 BC, it is likely that Myscellus made three founding expeditions to Kroton, the first in ca. 733 in the company of Archias of Corinth at the head of an Achaean-Spartan venture (when they founded Syracuse), but which did not result in a stable urban settlement. The second was in 720–709 at the head of an Achaean colonial expedition, hoping to settle in the Sybaris area. The third time was in ca. 708 when, at the head of a similar expedition, he founded Kroton.

Archaeology has shown that colonisation in the second half of the 8th century BC had an impact on the settlement organisation and on the economic and social structure of the indigenous communities: in the Kroton area most of the existing settlements disappeared, while grave goods from the Carrara necropolis highlight a widespread practice of mixed marriages between Greeks and indigenous women, since the first generation of settlers.

=== Greek era ===
It soon became one of the most flourishing cities of Magna Graecia reaching a population between 50,000 and 80,000 around 500 BC. During its early history Croton expanded its influence over the Bruttian peninsula founding possibly Caulonia in the second half of the 7th century BC.

The victory of Locri and Rhegium over Croton in the battle of the Sagra in middle of the sixth century BC interrupted the expansion of the city.

The walls of the city were 12 miles long and enclosed a vast area.

Its inhabitants were famous for their physical strength and for the simple sobriety of their lives. From 588 BC onwards, Croton produced many generations of winners in the Olympics and the other Panhellenic Games, the most famous of whom was Milo of Croton. The physicians of Croton were considered the foremost among the Greeks, and among them Democedes, son of Calliphon, was the most prominent in the 6th century BC. Accordingly, he travelled around Greece and ended up working in the court of Polycrates, tyrant of Samos. After the tyrant was murdered, Democedes was captured by the Persians and brought to King Darius, curing him of a dislocated ankle. Democedes' fame was, according to Herodotus, the basis for the prestige of Croton's physicians.

Croton formed a league with Sybaris against Siris and in the war that ensued after 550 BC Siris was destroyed.

Pythagoras founded his school at Croton c. 530 BC. Among his pupils were the early medical theorist Alcmaeon of Croton and the philosopher, mathematician, and astronomer Philolaus. The Pythagoreans acquired considerable influence with the supreme council of one thousand by which the city was ruled.

Sybaris started to become the rival of Croton under the influence of the Pythagoreans who disliked excess, until 510 BC when Sybaris was shaken by various political events leading to the rule of the tyrant Telys. Many aristocrats were forced to flee to Croton and when Telys asked them to hand over the Sybarite exiles, the Crotonians refused and Sybaris began the war. Croton sent an army of 100,000 men commanded by the wrestler Milo against Sybaris and destroyed it. As a consequence, Croton became the capital of a confederation including the 25 city-states in the region of Sybaris, as shown by numerous coins minted between 480 and 460 BC.

In 480 BC, Croton sent a ship led by the famous athlete Phayllos and armed at his own expense in support of the Greeks at the Battle of Salamis, the only one from the Italian coast. Half of a stone anchor block bearing his name was found at Capo Cimiti and currently preserved in the Museum of Capo Colonna.

It founded the colony of Terina on the Tyrrhenian coast in 480–470 BC.

Shortly afterwards, however, a bloody revolt led by the oligarch Cylon, during which many Pythagoreans were massacred and Pythagoras himself had to flee to Metapontum, led to the Pythagoreans being driven out and a democracy established. At the same time, other similar governments also fell and there were massacres and persecutions of Pythagoreans in all the Italian poleis.

Croton then experienced a period of decline. Around this time the Italiote league was founded to defend itself from the expansionist aims of Syracuse and from attacks by the Lucanians, with Croton as the hegemon of the league. The meeting place for the league was the Sanctuary of Hera Lacinia at Capo Collone 10 km away, which was also used as the federal treasury of the league. The decline was followed by general anarchy, not only in Croton but also in other cities. The intervention of Achaeans brought a truce to the anarchy and the colonies adopted the laws of their original homeland. This calm lasted until Dionysius, the tyrant of Syracuse, aiming at hegemony in Magna Graecia, captured Croton in 379 BC and held it for twelve years. Croton was then occupied by the Bruttii, with the exception of the citadel, in which the chief inhabitants had taken refuge; these soon after surrendered and were allowed to withdraw to Locri.

In 295 BC, Croton fell to another Syracusan tyrant, Agathocles. When Pyrrhus invaded Italy (280–278, 275 BC), it was still a considerable city, with twelve miles (19 km) of walls, but after the Pyrrhic War, half the town was deserted.

=== Roman era ===
What was left of its population submitted to Rome in 277 BC. After the Battle of Cannae in the Second Punic War (216 BC), Croton was betrayed to the Brutii by a democratic leader named Aristomachus, who defected to the Roman side. Hannibal made it his winter quarters for three years, and the city was not recaptured until 205 or 204 BC after the Battles of Croton.

In 194 BC, it became the site of a Roman colony. Little more is heard of it during the Republican and Imperial periods, though the action of one of the more significant surviving fragments of the Satyricon of Petronius is set in Croton, where he mentions the corrupt morals of its inhabitants.

=== Post-Roman era ===
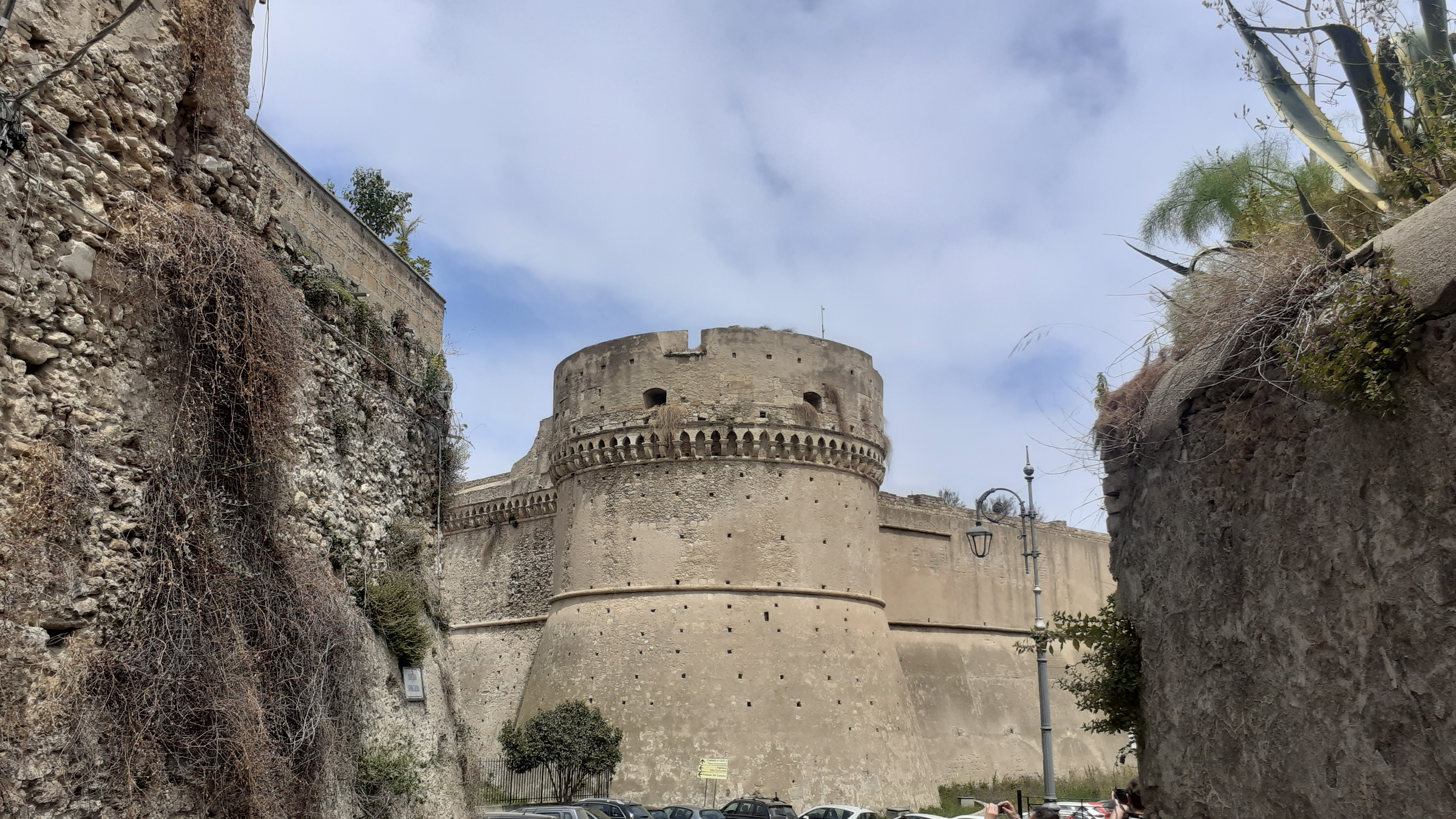
The castle of Charles V.

Around 550 AD, the city was unsuccessfully besieged by Totila, king of the Ostrogoths. At a later date it became a part of the Byzantine Empire. Around 841, the Republic of Venice sent a fleet of 60 galleys (each carrying 200 men) to assist the Byzantines in driving the Arabs from Crotone, but it failed.

About 870, it was sacked by the Saracens, who put to death the bishop and many people who had taken refuge in the cathedral but were not able to occupy the city. Over a hundred years later, Otto II, Holy Roman Emperor, mounted a campaign in southern Italy to reduce the power of the Byzantines. Later, Crotone was conquered by the Normans.

In 1806, it was occupied and sacked by the British, and later by the French. Thereafter it shared the fate of the Kingdom of Naples, including the period of Spanish rule of which the 16th-century castle of Charles V, overlooking modern Crotone, serves as a reminder. Its successor, the Kingdom of the Two Sicilies was conquered by the Kingdom of Sardinia in 1860 and incorporated into the new Kingdom of Italy in 1861.

=== Modern era ===
Crotone's location between the ports of Taranto and Messina, as well as its proximity to a source of hydroelectric power, favoured industrial development during the period between the two World Wars. In the 1930s its population doubled. However, after the two main employers, Pertusola Sud and Montedison, collapsed by the late 1980s, Crotone was in economic crisis, with many residents losing their jobs and leaving to find work elsewhere. In 1996, the river Esaro flooded the city, which dealt a further blow to the city's morale. Since that low point, the city has undergone urban renewal and risen in quality-of-life rankings.

== Archaeology ==
=== The city walls ===
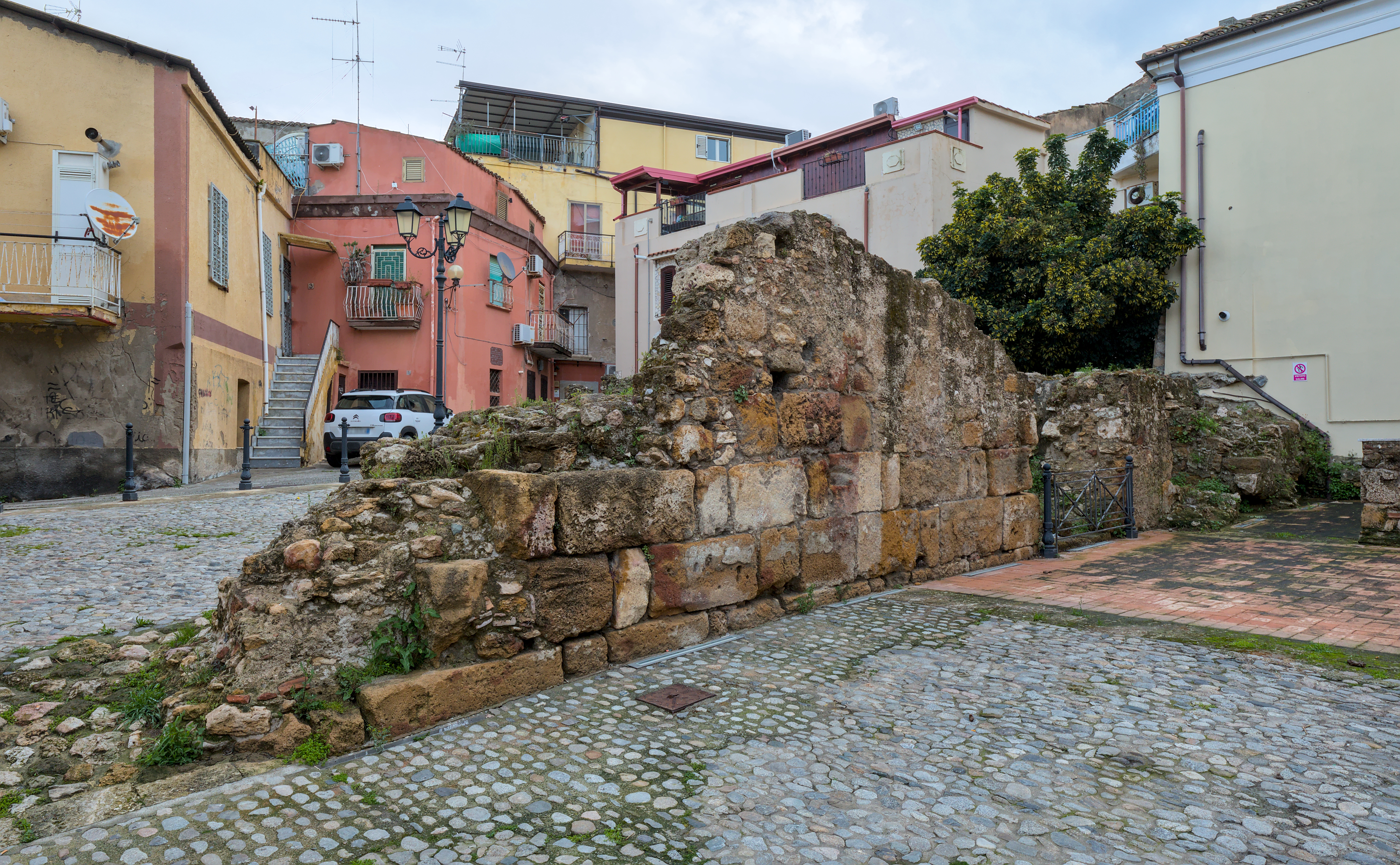
Remains of the city walls

The overall layout of the ancient wall circuit of Kroton was reconstructed by archaeology in recent decades. It descends from the St. Lucia hill to the nearby Carrara hill from where it headed north-west towards the Cimone Rapignese on which, at 40 m above sea level, traces of wall have been found, and from here it crossed the Esaro river. On St. Lucia hill material had been reused which confirms that it had been built or rebuilt after of Dionysius' siege. The archaeological data give a city area of at least 617 hectares which may not have been entirely occupied by buildings and may not originally have been entirely surrounded by walls.

A stretch near the river brought to light in 1978 was also described by Paolo Orsi at the beginning of the century. Also of notable importance are the sections on the "Vigna Nuova" hill and in the water collector of the industrial area of the Papaniciaro stream, where a large fragment was found with a double facing in opus quadratum and emplecton, dating to the mid-4th century BC.

From excavations carried out from 1975 the line of the Hellenistic walls was completed going up Battery hill and descending by the Pertusola factory towards the sea.

=== Urban excavations ===
Urban excavations between from 1975 have considerably expanded knowledge of the history of the settlement. As on all sites where modern cities are built over ancient towns, archaeological research is limited. The data seems to confirm the contemporary occupation of the whole walled area by reasonably close nuclei, between the hill of the Castle and that of the Battery, and northwards beyond the river Esaro, in an area still unoccupied by the modern town. The urban layout has emerged with a sequence of superimpositions throughout the life of the colony, datable between the end of the 7th and start of the 6th century BC. Three large urban blocks have been identified, organised with an orthogonal network of narrow streets (stenopoi) and streets between individual houses (ambitus). Numerous houses, both of residential nature and mixed house-artisan workshops, have been excavated, as have furnaces and shops specialising in pottery products, areas of necropolis of Hellenistic date. The construction techniques were functional and economical, generally using roughly cut stone, typical of the archaic age. To prevent the deterioration of the lower part of the walls due to rain water, stone footings were additionally protected by tiles or pieces of pithoi (large pottery vessels).

Prior to the construction of a new school in Acquabona di Crotone an excavation over a larger area has recently been possible. Two stenopoi about 5 m wide run across it on an alignment of + 30° E.

The discovery of a building in 2010 dating to the Republican age in Via Discesa Fosso indicated the possibility of locating of the Roman colony in the acropolis. The building had painted plaster in Pompeian style with tiled and marble floors.

An important domus found in Discesa Fosso includes baths and indicates a Roman-era "neighbourhood" which may have been distinguished from the rest of the Roman town by its secluded position of absolute prestige. It seems that it also had a small service port for the domus, perhaps a breakwater built to protect the port from which the Krotonian aristocrats during the second Punic war, having descended from the upper part of the city, embarked for Locri. Perhaps it is the Krotonian port mentioned by Cicero that determined the location of the colony as overlapping with the Greek polis.

== Geography ==
=== Climate ===
According to the Köppen climate classification, Crotone experiences a hot-summer Mediterranean climate (Csa).

Climate data for Crotone (1981–2010)
Month	Jan	Feb	Mar	Apr	May	Jun	Jul	Aug	Sep	Oct	Nov	Dec	Year
Record high °C (°F)	21.0 (69.8)	22.0 (71.6)	25.2 (77.4)	26.2 (79.2)	33.0 (91.4)	43.0 (109.4)	42.2 (108.0)	42.0 (107.6)	38.6 (101.5)	31.8 (89.2)	25.4 (77.7)	22.4 (72.3)	43.0 (109.4)
Mean daily maximum °C (°F)	12.7 (54.9)	12.8 (55.0)	14.9 (58.8)	17.7 (63.9)	22.9 (73.2)	27.9 (82.2)	30.9 (87.6)	30.9 (87.6)	26.3 (79.3)	21.9 (71.4)	17.2 (63.0)	13.6 (56.5)	20.8 (69.5)
Daily mean °C (°F)	10.3 (50.5)	10.1 (50.2)	12.0 (53.6)	14.8 (58.6)	19.2 (66.6)	23.4 (74.1)	26.3 (79.3)	26.5 (79.7)	22.9 (73.2)	19.3 (66.7)	14.8 (58.6)	11.5 (52.7)	17.6 (63.7)
Mean daily minimum °C (°F)	6.8 (44.2)	6.3 (43.3)	8.0 (46.4)	10.4 (50.7)	14.7 (58.5)	18.5 (65.3)	21.3 (70.3)	21.7 (71.1)	18.7 (65.7)	15.5 (59.9)	11.3 (52.3)	8.1 (46.6)	13.4 (56.2)
Record low °C (°F)	−6.2 (20.8)	−2.8 (27.0)	−1.6 (29.1)	0.8 (33.4)	3.6 (38.5)	8.2 (46.8)	10.0 (50.0)	11.6 (52.9)	9.0 (48.2)	4.0 (39.2)	1.0 (33.8)	−1.4 (29.5)	−6.2 (20.8)
Average precipitation mm (inches)	96.2 (3.79)	87.1 (3.43)	94.1 (3.70)	52.7 (2.07)	24.7 (0.97)	5.2 (0.20)	11.9 (0.47)	24.0 (0.94)	53.9 (2.12)	115.8 (4.56)	116.2 (4.57)	109.8 (4.32)	791.6 (31.14)
Average precipitation days (≥ 1 mm)	8.0	7.4	7.0	5.8	4.0	1.3	1.1	2.2	3.8	6.5	7.4	8.5	63
Average relative humidity (%)	75	73	72	72	68	62	57	62	64	74	78	75	69
Mean monthly sunshine hours	130.2	138.3	170.5	195.0	251.1	279.0	313.1	291.4	231.0	189.1	144.0	117.8	2,450.5
Source 1: Istituto Superiore per la Protezione e la Ricerca Ambientale
Source 2: Servizio Meteorologico (precipitation 1971–2000, sun and humidity 1961–1990) Servizio Meteorologico

=== Main sights ===
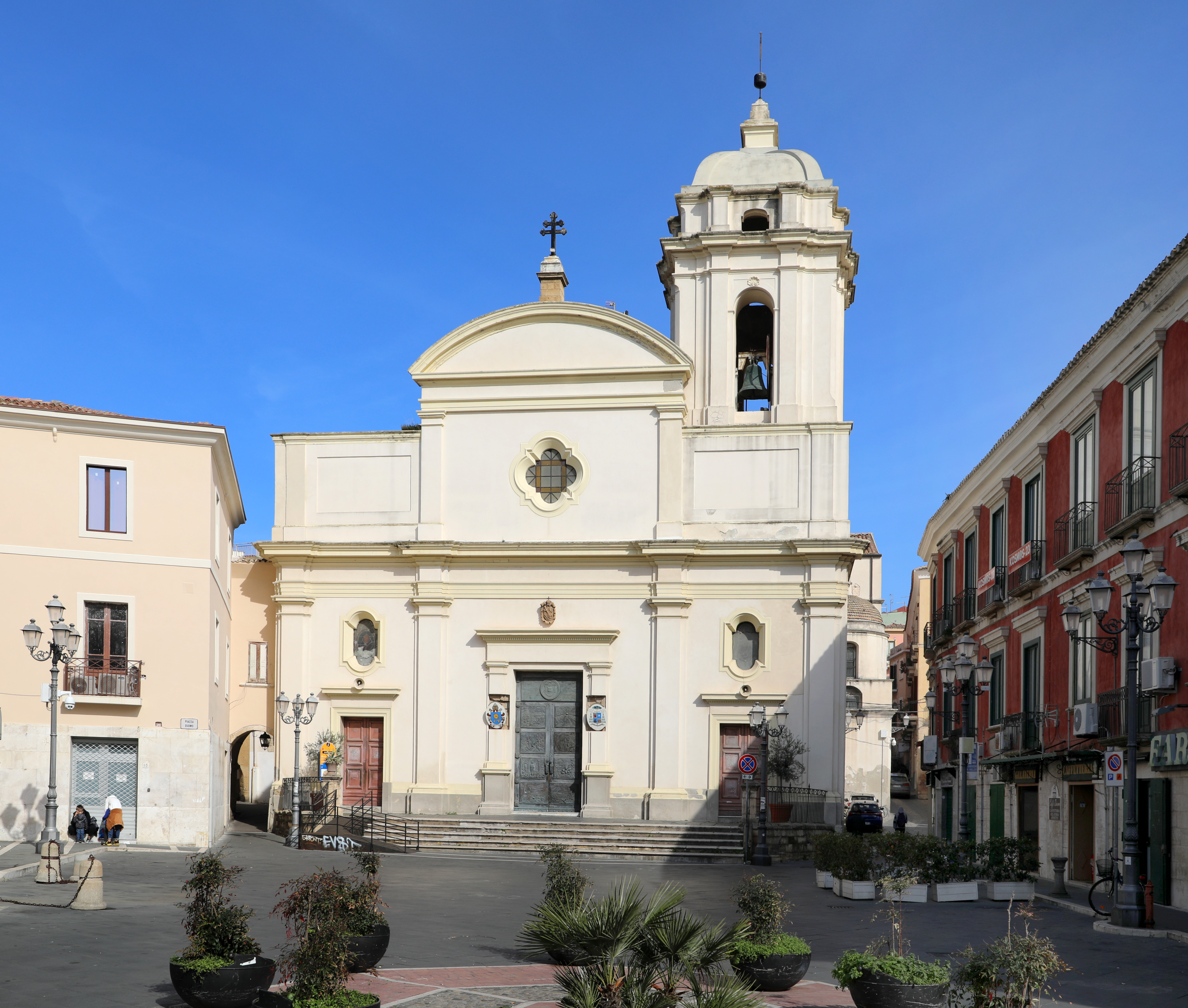
The Cathedral.

- The Cathedral, originally from the 9th to 11th centuries, but largely rebuilt. It has a neo-classical façade, while the interior has a nave with two aisles, with Baroque decorations. Noteworthy are a baptismal font (12th century) and the Madonna di Capo Colonna, the icon of the Black Madonna which, according to the tradition, was brought from East in the first years of the Christian era.
- The 16th-century Castle of Charles V. It houses the Town Museum, with findings excavated in the ancient site of Croton. Notable are also the remnants of the walls, of the same century, and of various watchtowers.
- The ancient castle built on an island, with accessibility on foot limited to a narrow strip of land, is referred to as Le Castella.

== Transportation ==
Crotone Airport (Sant'Anna Airport) is served by Italiatour.it and other charter airlines. Crotone also has a railway station, although much of the tourism traffic is served by the Salerno-Reggio Calabria highway and the National Road (called 106 Ionica) leading all the Jonic (eastern) coast from Taranto to Reggio Calabria. In recent times, Crotone Port has been used by visitors on yacht charter cruising vacations.

== Culture ==
=== Museums ===
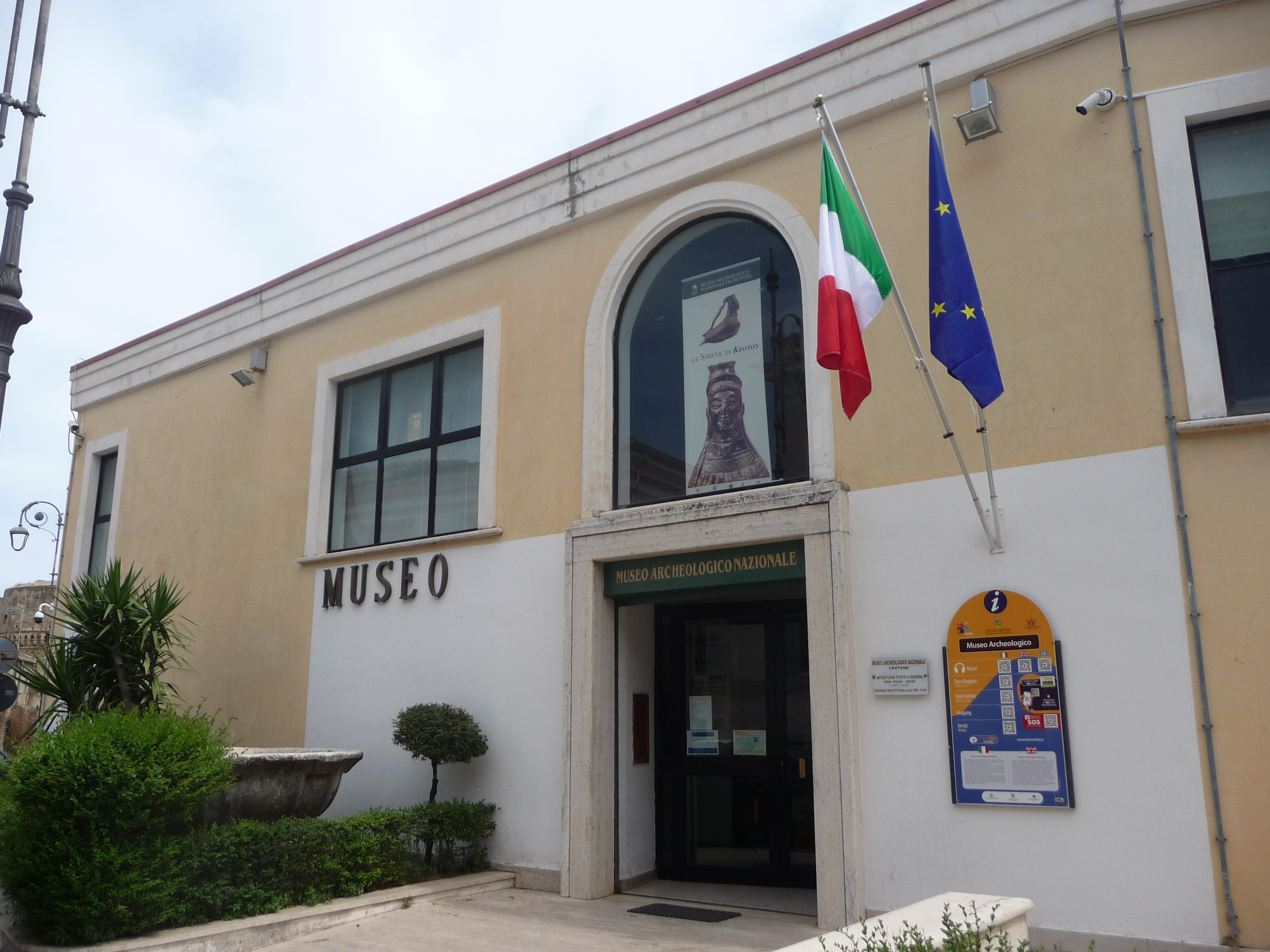
The National Archaeological Museum

Crotone hosts a national archaeological museum, a municipal museum, a municipal art gallery, and a provincial museum of contemporary art, as well as the Antiquarium di Torre Nao.

- National Archaeological Museum: founded in 1968, it is located on Risorgimento street, in the heart of the historic city center. The building consists of two floors and contains all of the most significant finds from the archaeological sites of the entire territory Crotone. In particular rich archaeological finds come from the Sanctuary of Hera Lacinia site in Capo Colonna.

=== Sport ===
F.C. Crotone is a football club in Serie C. The team was promoted to top flight Serie A for the first time in its history for the 2016–17 season, and after two years in Serie B, was again promoted to play in Serie A for the 2020–21 season.

Achei Crotone is an American football club in Italy's 3rd division. It was established in 1989 and is considered one of the most storied teams in Italy.

=== Churches ===
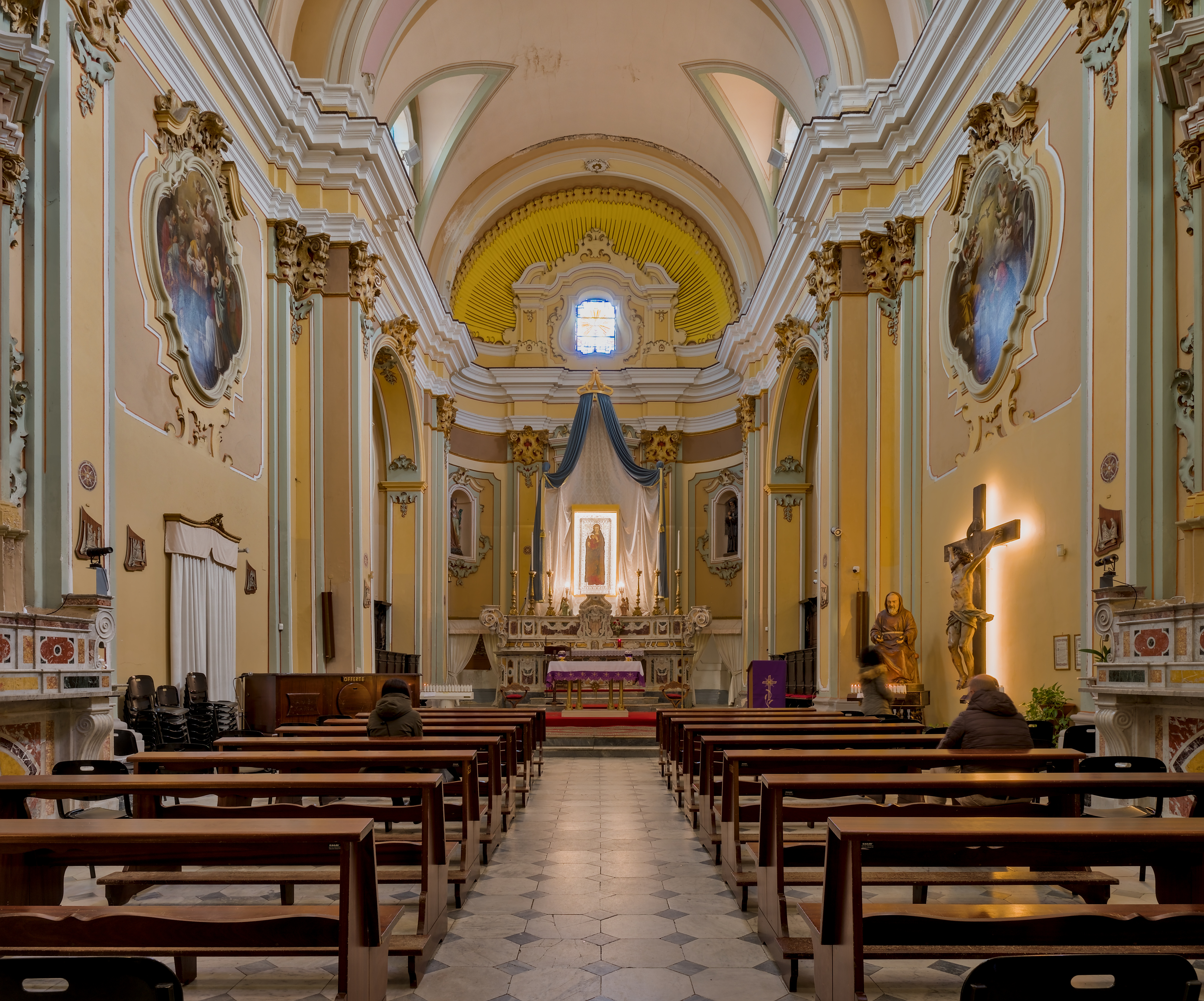
Interior of the church of the Immaculate Conception

Church of the Immaculate Conception: the original construction of the Cathedral dates back to the 9th century. Initially it was dedicated to St. Dionysius, and later, around 1462–1463, to the Assumption of Saint Mary into heaven. During the centuries, the church was subject to various restoration, although in the 16th century the bishop A. Lucifero undertook its complete reconstruction, using materials removed from the ancient temple of Hera Lacinia. The interior of the church has three naves divided by pillars.

The Cathedral: in 1686, as attested by an existing marble plaque in the current church, on the old oratory a church was built and dedicated to the Blessed Virgin Mary by a group of lay people who had decided to give birth to a lay congregation in honour of the Blessed Virgin Mary and the Souls in Purgatory, which was also called La Congregazione dei Plebei ("The Congregation of the Plebeians"). The façade, which recalls in its features the sober and austere neoclassical style setting, is a harmonious and unifying element. It has a portal with a single architrave, surmounted by a stained glass window, depicting the Virgin, and two niches with statues, all topped by a triangular gable and side pinnacles.

=== Literary reference ===
Crotone appears in the Philippine national epic Florante at Laura as the Kingdom of Krotona. The poem narrates this as the homeland of the protagonist Florante's mother, Princess Floresca.

In Petronius' Satyricon, which survives in fragments, the narrator and his friends arrive at Croton, famous for its legacy hunters. The narrator's companion, the manic poet Eumolpus, poses as a childless, rich old man. Upon arrival to the city, Philomela, a citizen of Croton, seduces Eumolpus by means of her children. The extant portion of the Satyricon ends with Eumolpus explaining that the people of Croton must agree to eat his dead body if they wish to claim his inheritance.

== Notable people ==
- Milo of Croton (6th century BCE), Olympic athlete
- Dameas of Croton, sculptor who created the statue of Milo of Croton, which was placed at Olympia, Greece
- Phayllos of Croton, Olympic athlete/war hero in battle of Salamina
- Astylos of Croton (5th century BCE), Olympic athlete
- Glycon of Croton (6th century BCE), Olympic athlete
- Democedes of Croton (6th century BCE), physician
- Calliphon of Croton (6th century BCE), physician
- Philippus of Croton (6th century BCE), Olympic athlete/war hero
- Aristomachus of Croton, ancient party leader of Croton during the Hannibalian war
- Alcmaeon of Croton (5th century BCE), philosopher and medical theorist
- Arignote (6th century BCE), Pythagorean philosopher
- Philolaus of Croton (5th century BCE), pythagorean philosopher
- Pythagoras, mathematician and philosopher. He lived in Crotone c. 530 BCE.
- Nicholas of Crotone, 13th-century bishop
- Vincenzo Scaramuzza, pianist and music teacher, born in Crotone
- Rino Gaetano, singer, born in Crotone
- Sergio Cammariere, singer, born in Crotone
- Vincenzo Iaquinta, footballer, born in Crotone
- Autoleon, ancient war hero
- Alessandro Riolo, footballer, born in Crotone

== Twin towns – sister cities ==
Crotone is twinned with:

- Giannitsa, Macedonia, Greece, since 2010
- Porto, Norte, Portugal, since 2010

== See also ==
- Capo Colonne Lighthouse
