= Colonne =

Commune in Bourgogne-Franche-Comté, France

- Commune
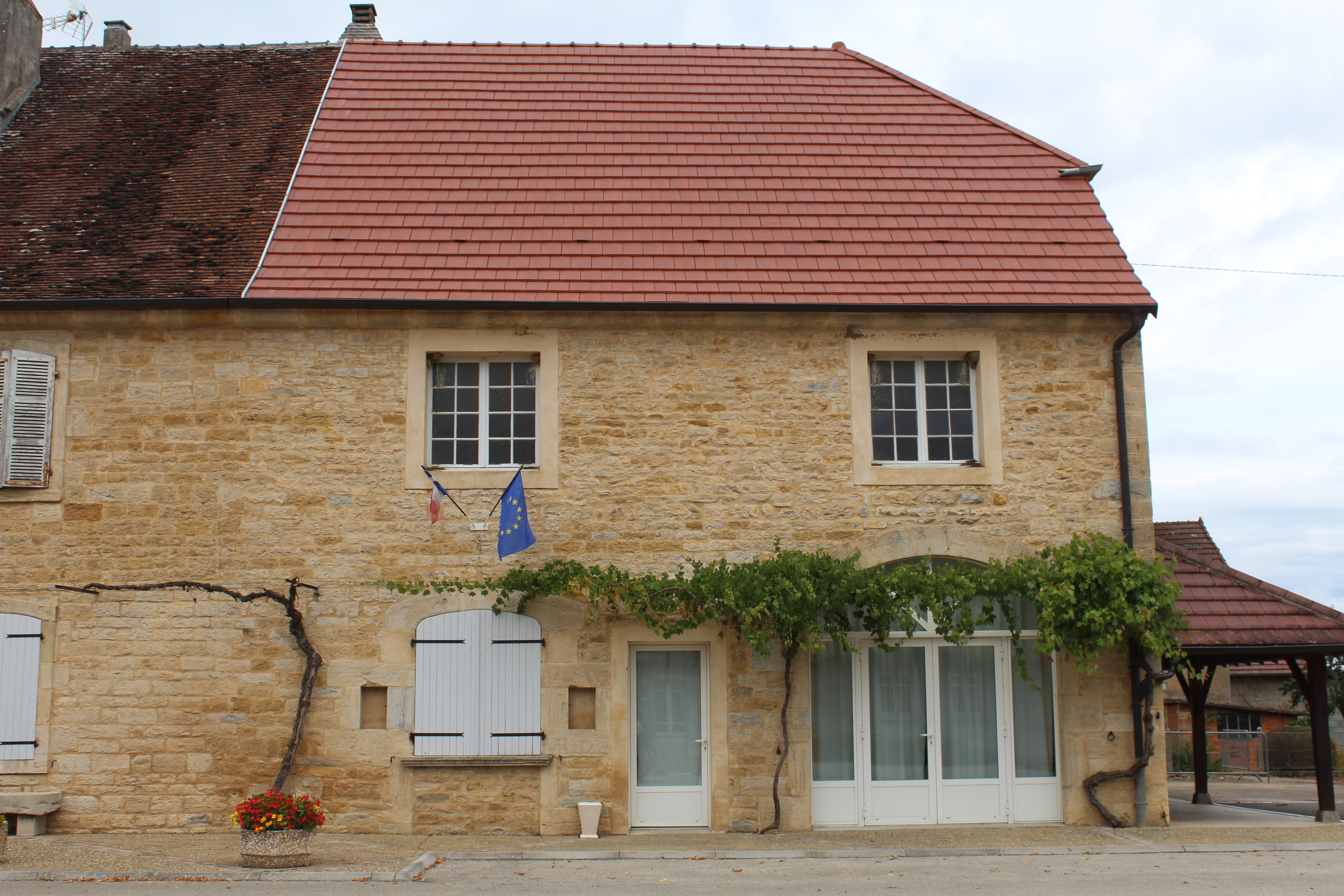
- The town hall in Colonne
- Location of Colonne
- Location within France Location within Bourgogne-Franche-Comté
- Coordinates: 46°53′07″N 5°34′37″E
- Country: France
- Region: Bourgogne-Franche-Comté
- Department: Jura
- Arrondissement: Dole
- Canton: Bletterans

Government
  - Mayor (2023–2026): Charles Vallet
- Area^{1}: 11.13 km^{2} (4.30 sq mi)
- Highest elevation: 245 m (804 ft)
- Lowest elevation: 213 m (699 ft)
- Population (2023): 256
  - Density: 23.0/km^{2} (59.6/sq mi)
- Time zone: UTC+01:00 (CET)
  - Summer (DST): UTC+02:00 (CEST)
- INSEE/Postal code: 39159 /39800
- ^{1} French Land Register data, which excludes lakes, ponds, glaciers > 1 km^{2} (0.386 sq mi or 247 acres) and river estuaries.

Colonne (French pronunciation: [kɔlɔn]) is a commune in the Jura department in Bourgogne-Franche-Comté in eastern France.

== Population ==
Historical population
Year	Pop.	±% p.a.
1968	263	—
1975	248	−0.84%
1982	234	−0.83%
1990	235	+0.05%
1999	233	−0.09%
2007	256	+1.18%
2012	262	+0.46%
2017	264	+0.15%
2023	256	−0.51%
Source: INSEE

== See also ==
- Communes of the Jura department
