= Statio =

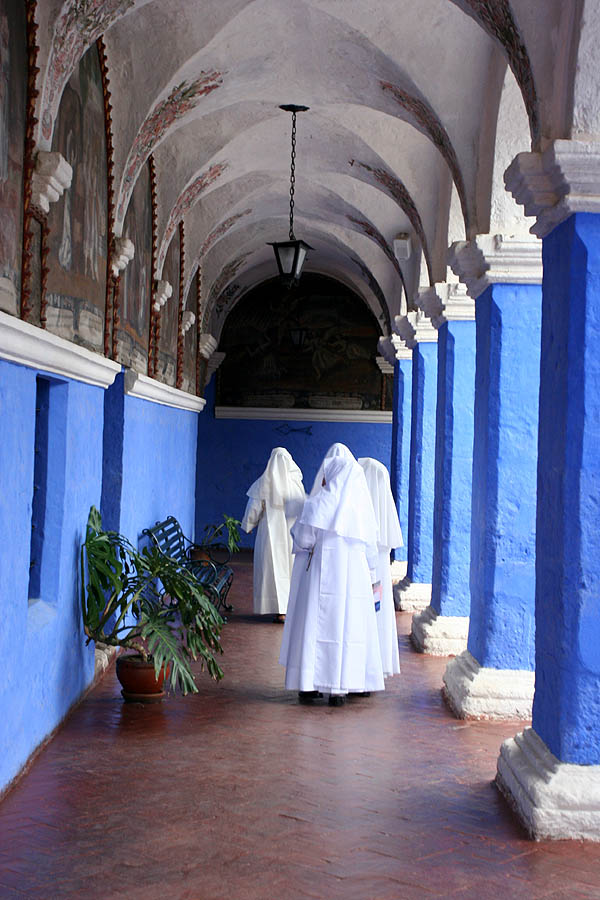
Sisters at a statio in the apses of Santa Catalina Monastery in Arequipa

A statio (Latin for "position" or "location") is the place where, in the Roman Rite, a devotion to the stations of the Cross is celebrated.

On specific station days, on which in the Late Roman Catholic liturgy of the Late Antiquity a devotion to the stations of the Cross took place led by the bishop or his representative, the bishop, the clergy and the faithful gathered in an assembly church (ecclesia collecta) for a short service of worship (collecta). From there, they went on a procession to the station church. Sometimes the procession would stop at churches or shrines along the way to hold a short devotion to the stations of the Cross. Collecta processions took place on days of penance, such as the ember days, the feast of Candlemas, on Ash Wednesday and several weekdays in Lent. With the adoption of Roman liturgy in the Frankish region in the early Middle Ages, the Rite of the Collecta spread further.

In addition, the assembly of celebrants and the element of liturgical services before the start of church services and the gathering of the convent of a monastery before the liturgy of the hours in the cloister of the abbey is called a statio. Likewise the term is commonly used for the intermediate stations during pilgrimages, walks of penance and processions, as well as the up to four stations in the procession to the outer altars during Corpus Christi processions.
