= Gaius Fonteius Capito (consul 33 BC) =

Gaius Fonteius Capito (fl. 1st century BC) was a Roman senator who was appointed suffect consul in 33 BC.

== Biography ==
Fonteius Capito, a novus homo, was the son of Gaius Fonteius Capito and a supporter of the Triumvir Marcus Antonius. Of Plebeian origins, perhaps he was a Plebeian Tribune in about 39 BC, and he may have belonged to one of the priesthoods of Ancient Rome by this time. In 39/38 BC, Antonius appointed him to the office of monetalis in one of the eastern provinces of the Roman Empire, during which time he minted coins with Antony's and his wife Octavia's portrait.

In the year 37 BC, at a time of increased tension between Marcus Antonius and his colleague Octavianus, Fonteius Capito served as Antony's representative in Italy. After having negotiated with Octavianus, he travelled with Gaius Maecenas, Lucius Cocceius Nerva, and a number of poets including Horace and Virgil, down to Brundisium in order to discuss the situation with Marcus Antonius and to prepare the groundwork for the Pact of Tarentum.

After concluding the initial treaty negotiations, Antony sent Fonteius Capito in the autumn of 37 BC to Egypt. From there he escorted Queen Cleopatra VII to Antioch in Syria, which was where Antony had his headquarters in the east. He arrived with Cleopatra in the winter of 37/36 BC.

Then, in 33 BC, Fonteius Capito was appointed suffect consul, a post he held from May to June of that year.

== See also ==
- List of Roman consuls

== Sources ==
- Broughton, T. Robert S., The Magistrates of the Roman Republic, Vol II (1952)
- Broughton, T. Robert S., The Magistrates of the Roman Republic, Vol III (1986)

Political offices
Preceded by Lucius Volcatius Tullus	Suffect consul of the Roman Republic; 33 BC with Lucius Flavius (suffect)	Succeeded by Quintus Laronius (suffect)
