= Nicholas of Crotone =

Nicholas of Crotone was a 13th-century Greek-speaking bishop of Crotone, an Italian coastal city on the Ionian Sea which, from the Middle Ages until 1928, was known as Cotrone.

As a Roman Catholic who was fluent in Greek, Nicholas spent much time in Constantinople and as an ambassador between that city and the Pope in Rome. His fluency in Greek also gave the Byzantine emperor Michael VIII Palaeologus the capacity to begin negotiations for the reconciliation of the Eastern Orthodox and Roman Catholic churches. The rapprochement was predicated on the grounds that previous interpreters had incorrectly conveyed the theological ideas on both sides, leading to an unjustified disagreement.
