= Antonio Seripando =

Italian humanist (1476–1531)

Seripando's ex libris from a copy of Plutarch's Problemata printed at Venice by Domenico Siliprandi in 1477, which had been part of Parrasio's library. The inscription reads: Antonij Seripandi ex Iani Parrhasij testamento, 'Antonio Seripandi's, from the will of Giano Parrasio'.

Antonio Seripando (1476–1531) was an Italian Renaissance humanist and book collector.

Seripando was the eldest son of Giovanni Ferdinando and Isabella Luisa Galeota, minor nobility living in the Porta Capuana district of Naples. His parents died not long after the birth of his brother Troiano in 1493. As a result, responsibility for raising the child fell to him. In September 1506, when Troiano tried to join the Dominicans of Santa Caterina a Formiello, Antonio brought him back. In March 1507, however, he approved his entrance into the Augustinian friars of San Giovanni a Carbonara, which was more congruent with Antonio's intellectual interests. He was already a member of the circle around Giovanni Gioviano Pontano and a friend of Jacopo Sannazzaro.

In 1512, Seripando joined the entourage of Cardinal Luigi d'Aragona as a secretary and lived in Rome. He did not travel with the cardinal but received a copy of Antonio de Beatis' travel diary. In 1518, he was ordained a priest. Following the cardinal's death in January 1519, he returned to Naples, but intellectual pursuits brought him back to Rome in March 1521. In 1522, the humanist Aulo Giano Parrasio bequeathed his collection of 1,500 books to him. Many volumes from Seripando's collection still bear his ex libris, "Antonii Seripandi et amicorum". When Antonio died in 1531, his library passed to his brother. His tomb is the centrepiece of the Seripando Chabel constructed by his brother after 1560.

== Bibliography ==
- Cassese, Michele (2018). "Seripando, Troiano". Dizionario Biografico degli Italiani, Volume 92: Semino–Sisto IV (in Italian). Rome: Istituto dell'Enciclopedia Italiana. ISBN 978-8-81200032-6.
- Hale, J. R., ed. (1979). The Travel Journal of Antonio de Beatis through Germany, Switzerland, the Low Countries, France and Italy, 1517–8. Hakluyt Society.
- Rowland, Ingrid (2020). "The Seripando Library of Naples". History of Humanities. 5 (2): 497–510. doi:10.1086/710284.
