= Antonio de Beatis =

Antonio de Beatis was an Italian canon best known for his travel diary of 1517–1518, a work of major value in art history.

== Life ==
De Beatis was born in Molfetta, but the date of his birth is unknown.

He served as a secretary to Cardinal Luigi d'Aragona during the latter's European tour of 1517–1518, in which capacity he recited the divine office, helped prepare or even perform the Mass and wrote letters on the cardinal's behalf. He kept a personal diary of the trip, with daily entries beginning with their departure from Ferrara on 9 May 1517 and ending with their return there on 26 January 1518, although the trip did not end until they reached Rome on 16 March.

De Beatis made copies of his diary for friends, including the humanist Antonio Seripando. He was still making copies into 1521. The date of his death is unknown.

== Travel diary ==
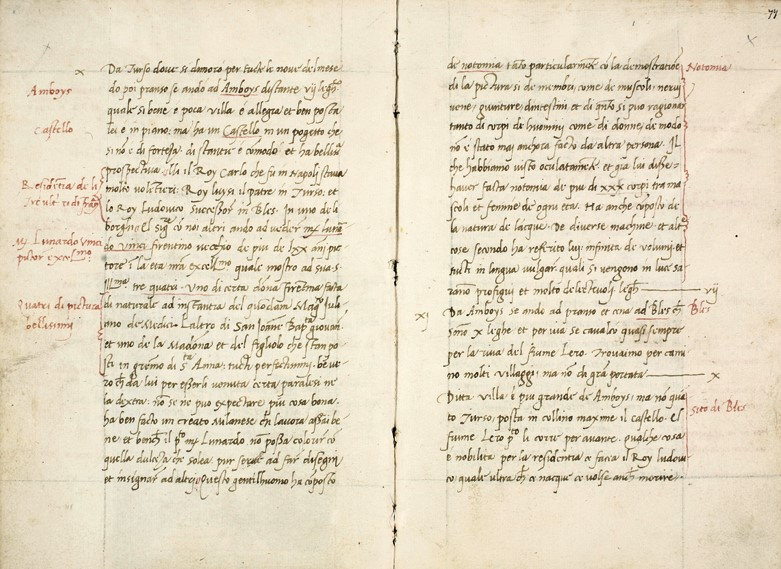
Page from De Beatis's journal describing his meeting with Leonardo da Vinci on 10 October 1517. The red underlining and marginal notes indicate lemmata in the index.

Only one of the three copies of De Beatis's diary to be examined by scholars had a title: Viaggi, et Itinerario di Mon. R.mo et Ill.mo il Cardinal' de' Aragona .incominciando dalla Città di Ferrara anno M.D.XVII. Mense Maij ('Voyage and Itinerary of My Lord the Most Reverend and Illustrious Cardinal of Aragon, Beginning from the City of Ferrara in the Year 1517, Month of May'). The original contained illustrations, of which only those of the Shroud of Turin and Francis of Paola are found in the surviving copies, which were not intended for publication.

The language of the diary is the vernacular of Apulia, since De Beatis claims that his knowledge of Latin and Tuscan is inadequate. In an introductory letter to one of the 1521 copies, he states that he kept the diary at the cardinal's urging. It consists mainly of notes made at the time based on firsthand witness or, as De Beatis says, reports by "persons of great authority and worthy of all trust and belief". It does not appear to have undergone heavy editing or to be heavily indebted to written sources.

The purpose of the cardinal's trip was pleasure, taking advantage of a lull in the Italian Wars. According to De Beatis, the cardinal was familiar with Spain and Italy and so resolved that "he would also get to know Germany, France and all those other regions bordering the northern and western ocean and make himself known to so great a variety of people." The official excuse for the trip was to meet the cardinal's relative, the future Charles V, Holy Roman Emperor, who was already King of Spain and Lord of the Netherlands. The meeting took place on 12 July in Middelburg.

De Beatis's diary is of major historical interest for its firsthand accounts of meeting with famous persons and for its descriptions of works of art. Besides Charles V, the cardinal met King Francis I of France at Rouen, the banker Jakob Fugger at Augsburg and the polymath Leonardo da Vinci at Cloux. De Beatis saw tapestries designed by Raphael being produced in Brussels. He praises the Ghent Altarpiece as "the finest painting in Christendom". He claims that the figures in Da Vinci's Last Supper are based on certain Milanese personalities.

De Beatis provided his diary with a large alphabetical index, unusual for the time.

== Bibliography ==
- Hale, J. R., ed. (1979). The Travel Journal of Antonio de Beatis through Germany, Switzerland, the Low Countries, France and Italy, 1517–8. Hakluyt Society.
- Moneta, Milena (1987). "De Beatis, Antonio". Dizionario Biografico degli Italiani (in Italian). Vol. 33: D'Asaro–De Foresta. Rome: Istituto dell'Enciclopedia Italiana. ISBN 978-88-12-00032-6.
