= Cosenza =

City in Calabria, Italy

Cosenza Cusenza (Calabrian)
- Comune
- Città di Cosenza
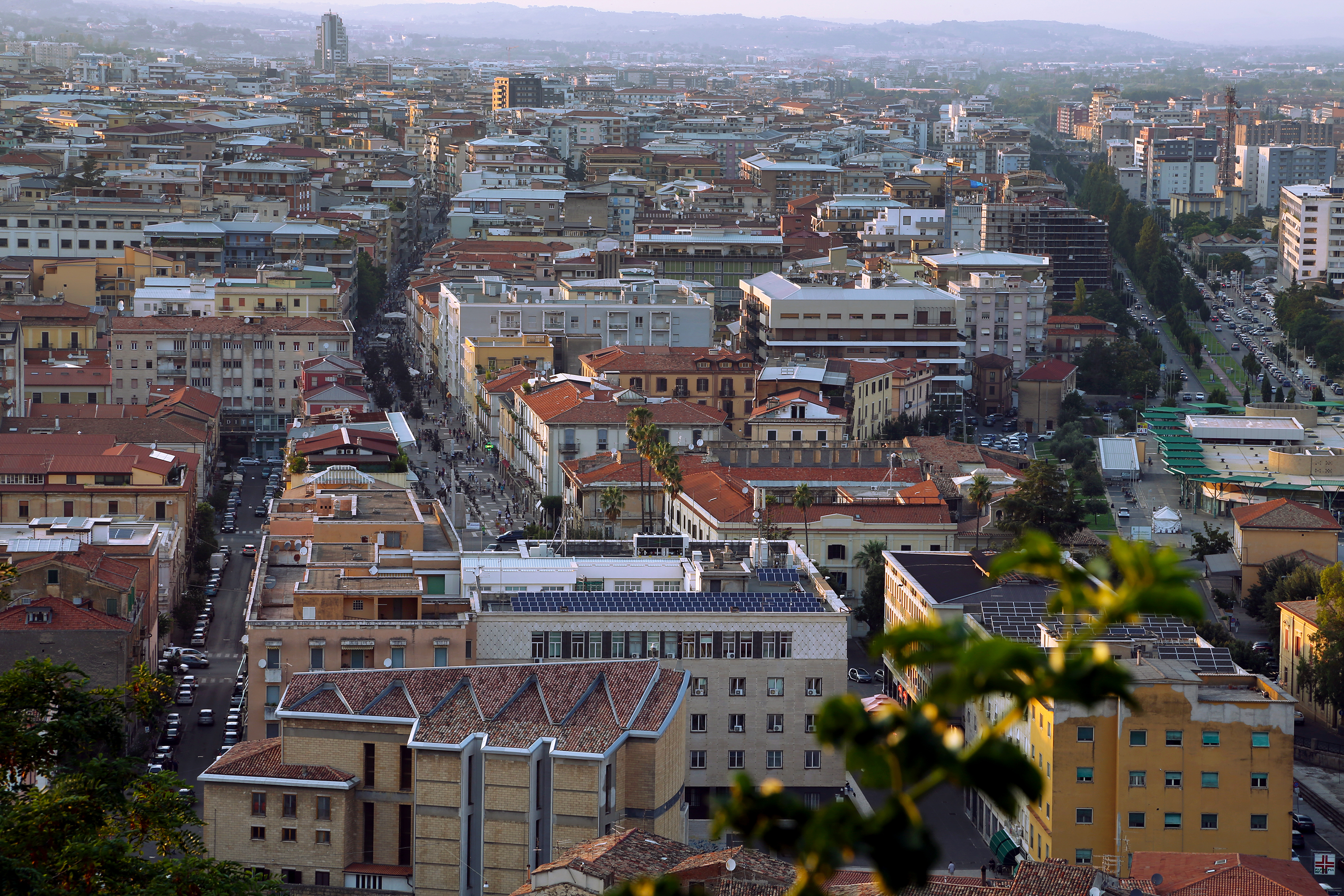
- View of the modern city

- Flag Coat of arms

- Cosenza within the province of Cosenza

- Location of Cosenza in Italy Cosenza (Calabria)
- Coordinates: 39°18′N 16°15′E
- Country: Italy
- Region: Calabria
- Province: Cosenza (CS)
- Frazioni: Donnici, Sant'Ippolito, Borgo Partenope, Muoio

Government
  - Mayor: Franz Caruso (PSI)

Area
  - Comune: 37.86 km^{2} (14.62 sq mi)
- Elevation: 238 m (781 ft)

Population (2025)
  - Comune: 63,240
  - Density: 1,670/km^{2} (4,326/sq mi)
  - Urban: 250,000
- Demonym: Cosentians (Italian: cosentini)
- Time zone: UTC+1 (CET)
  - Summer (DST): UTC+2 (CEST)
- Postal code: 87100
- Dialing code: 0984
- Patron saint: Our Lady of the Pillar
- Saint day: 12 February
- Website: Official website

Cosenza (Italian: [koˈzɛntsa]; Cosentian: Cusenza, [kuˈsɛndza]) is a city and comune (municipality) located in the region of Calabria in southern Italy. The city has a population of 63,240, making it the 5th-largest city in Calabria, while the urban area counts more than 250,000 inhabitants. It is the capital of the province of Cosenza, which has a population of more than 700,000.

The ancient town is the seat of the Cosentian Academy, one of the oldest academies of philosophical and literary studies in Italy and Europe. To this day, Cosenza remains a cultural hub, with several museums, monuments, theatres and libraries. The modern city is the centre of an urban agglomeration including, among others, the municipality of Rende, where the University of Calabria is located.

== History ==
=== Origins ===
The ancient Consentia (Ancient Greek: Κωσεντία), capital of the Italic tribe of the Brettii, was a bulwark of the Italic people against the Hellenic influences of the Ionian colonies. It was in this province that the Battle of Pandosia was fought, in which a small Italic army composed of Brettii and Lucanians defeated the uncle of Alexander the Great, who was known as Alexander of Epirus. Over the centuries, Cosenza maintained a distinctive character, that marked it out among the cities of the region. Under Emperor Augustus, it became an important stopover on the Roman route via Popilia, which connected Calabria to Sicily. During the Roman Empire, the town benefited from municipal privileges.

=== Alaric's legendary tomb ===
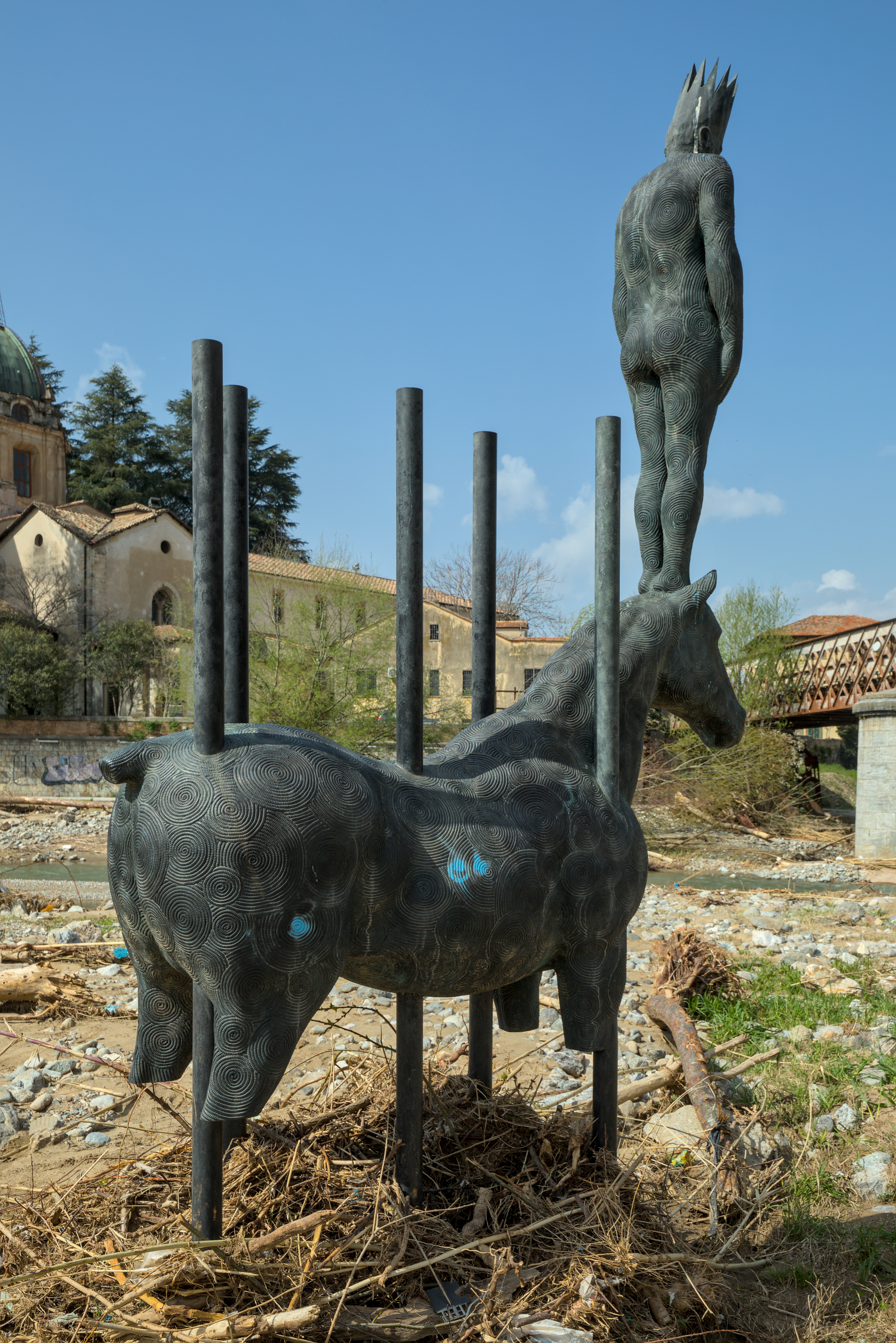
Monument to Alaric I

In 410 AD, Alaric I, king of the Visigoths, sacked the city of Rome, becoming the first foreign enemy to capture the city in more than 800 years. Alaric amassed a great amount of treasure during his conquest of Rome. According to the historian Jordanes, after sacking Rome Alaric headed south with his troops, advancing easily until reaching the area of Cosenza, where he died. No one is certain how this happened: Some believe he contracted a disease that took his life, while others feel that his death came from an attack by enemy forces. In any case, his troops honored their king by burying him in a tomb in Cosenza. His burial place is said to have been at the confluence of the Busento and Crathis rivers. A horde of slaves were used to divert the water from the Busento, allowing them to dig a tomb large enough for Alaric, his horse, and all of the treasure amassed from his conquests in Rome. Once the tomb was completed, the river was returned to its bed and the tomb covered with water. Then, to ensure that no one would reveal this location to anyone, Alaric's troops killed all of the slaves.

In the centuries after the fall of the Western Roman Empire, several towns in the province of Cosenza, most notably Rossano, refused to acknowledge the new governments of the Ostrogoths. Instead, they used their good fortune of having strong city walls and small Roman garrisons to hold out for centuries as semi-independent enclaves of the still extant Eastern Roman Empire in Italy.

=== Norman, Hohenstaufen, and Angevin period ===
Bitterly disputed between the Saracens and the Lombards, the town was destroyed, then rebuilt around 988; only to be ravaged again in the early eleventh century. In the attempt to escape the devastation, the population left the town and sheltered on the surrounding hills where they built some small hamlets (still denominated as, casali).

By the first half of the eleventh century, Lombard Calabria became a feudal dukedom of the Normans, with Cosenza as the capital. The town soon rebelled against the rule of Roger Guiscard and was recaptured only after a long siege. Subsequently, under the Hohenstaufen rule, the town became the seat of the Court of Calabria (Curia Generale). Emperor Frederick II had a particular interest in the town: he promoted construction and economic activities, organising an important annual fair.

Subsequently, Cosenza fought bitterly against the Angevin domination, supported by the clergy. While the uprising spread through the valley of the Crathis, the town was involved in the see-sawing fight between Angevins and the Crown of Aragon. In 1432, King Louis III of Anjou settled in the castle of Cosenza with his wife Margaret of Savoy. When he died untimely, in 1434, he was buried in the cathedral.

=== Spanish domination ===
In 1500, in spite of resistance, Cosenza was occupied by the Spanish army led by Captain Gonzalo Fernández de Córdoba. During the sixteenth century the town experienced a period of expansion as the seat of the Viceroy of Calabria. At the same time its cultural importance grew thanks to the foundation of the Accademia Cosentina; among its most renowned members were Bernardino Telesio, Aulo Gianni Parrasio, the Martirano brothers, Antonio Serra, and others.

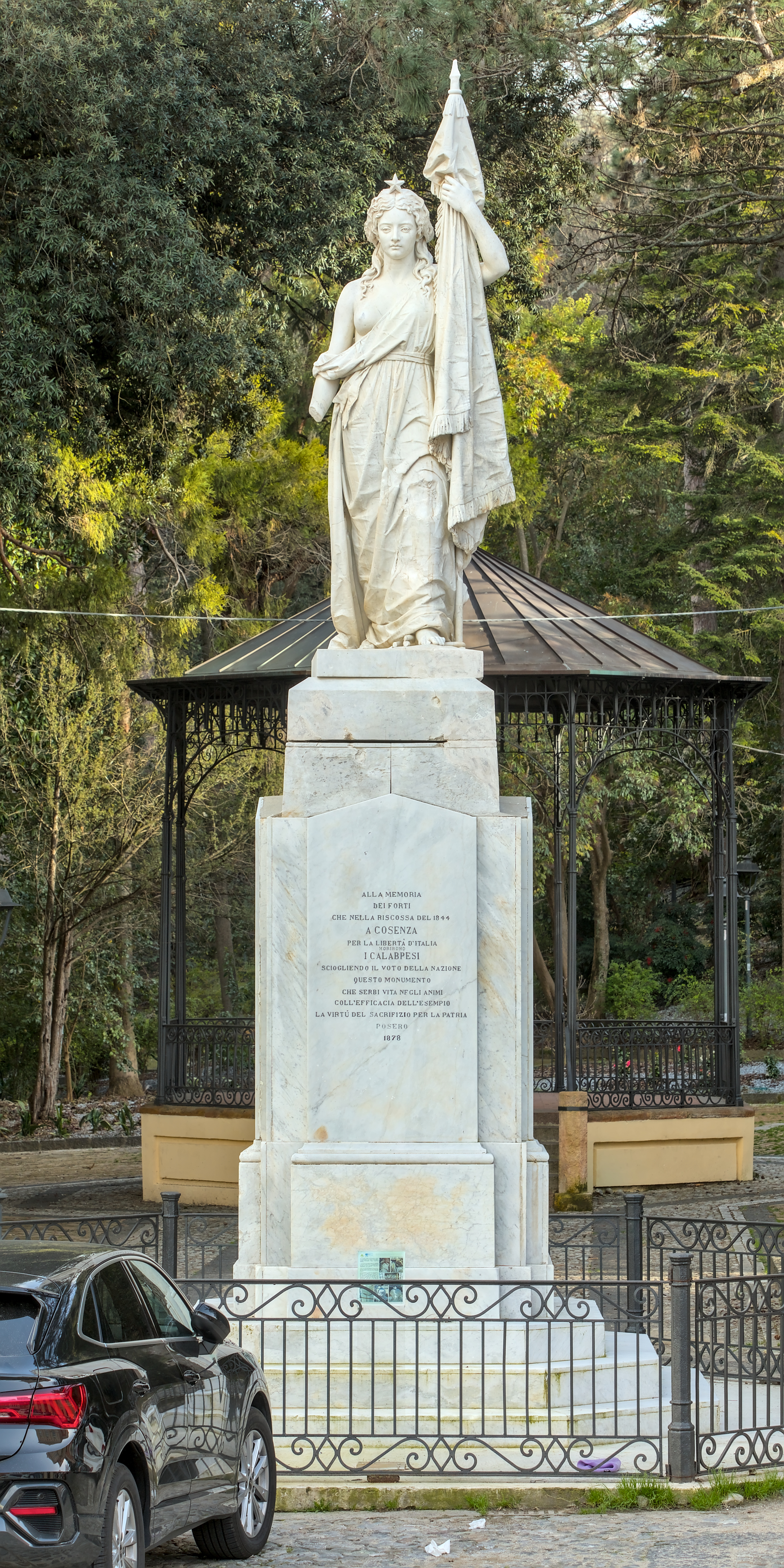
The Monument to the Independence and Unity of Italy, celebrating the uprising of 15 March 1844.

In 1707, the Austrians succeeded the Spanish in the Kingdom of Naples, followed by the Bourbons. After the proclamation in 1799 of the short-lived Parthenopean Republic and a vain resistance, the town was finally occupied for the Bourbons by Cardinal Fabrizio Ruffo's Lazzari. Cardinal Ruffo was native of the province of Cosenza.

=== Modern age ===
From 1806 to 1815, Cosentians fought hard against French domination. Cruel suppressions characterised that period and it was a cradle of the Carbonari secret societies. In 1813, the town saw many rebels executed. The local riots of 1821 and 1837 heralded the Risorgimento. They were followed by the uprising of 15 March 1844, which reached its climax with the “noble folly” of the Bandiera Brothers, who were executed together with some of their followers in the Vallone di Rovito in Cosenza. In 1860, some months after the rapid and overwhelmingly heroic deeds of Garibaldi's troops, a plebiscite proclaimed the annexation of Calabria to the new Kingdom of Italy.

== Geography ==
Situated at the confluence of two historical rivers, the Busento and the Crati, Cosenza stands 238 m above sea level in a valley between the Sila and the coastal range of mountains. The old town, overshadowed by its Swabian castle, descends to the river Crati. The modern city lies to the north, beyond the Busento, on level ground.

Almost completely surrounded by mountains, Cosenza is subject to a microclimate scarcely influenced by the effects of the Mediterranean Sea. It experiences cold winters and hot summers.

=== Climate ===
According to the Köppen climate classification, Cosenza experiences a hot-summer Mediterranean climate (Csa).

Climate data for Cosenza (1981–2010)
Month	Jan	Feb	Mar	Apr	May	Jun	Jul	Aug	Sep	Oct	Nov	Dec	Year
Mean daily maximum °C (°F)	12.3 (54.1)	13.0 (55.4)	16.0 (60.8)	19.1 (66.4)	24.5 (76.1)	29.2 (84.6)	32.2 (90.0)	32.7 (90.9)	27.7 (81.9)	22.9 (73.2)	17.3 (63.1)	13.1 (55.6)	21.7 (71.0)
Daily mean °C (°F)	8.3 (46.9)	8.5 (47.3)	10.9 (51.6)	13.7 (56.7)	18.4 (65.1)	22.7 (72.9)	25.4 (77.7)	25.9 (78.6)	21.5 (70.7)	17.4 (63.3)	12.6 (54.7)	9.2 (48.6)	16.2 (61.2)
Mean daily minimum °C (°F)	4.2 (39.6)	3.9 (39.0)	5.9 (42.6)	8.4 (47.1)	12.3 (54.1)	16.2 (61.2)	18.6 (65.5)	19.0 (66.2)	15.4 (59.7)	12.2 (54.0)	7.9 (46.2)	5.2 (41.4)	10.8 (51.4)
Average precipitation mm (inches)	121 (4.8)	105 (4.1)	90 (3.5)	67 (2.6)	46 (1.8)	28 (1.1)	15 (0.6)	24 (0.9)	64 (2.5)	86 (3.4)	132 (5.2)	133 (5.2)	911 (35.7)
Average precipitation days (≥ 1.0 mm)	10	10	8	9	6	4	3	3	7	8	11	12	91
Source 1: Istituto Superiore per la Protezione e la Ricerca Ambientale
Source 2: Climi e viaggi (precipitation days)

== Demographics ==
Historical population
Year	Pop.	±%
1861	18,366	—
1871	16,918	−7.9%
1881	17,434	+3.1%
1901	20,857	+19.6%
1911	23,805	+14.1%
1921	30,659	+28.8%
1931	35,164	+14.7%
1936	40,032	+13.8%
1951	57,010	+42.4%
1961	78,611	+37.9%
1971	102,086	+29.9%
1981	106,801	+4.6%
1991	86,664	−18.9%
2001	72,998	−15.8%
2011	69,484	−4.8%
2021	64,073	−7.8%
Source: ISTAT

As of 2025, Cosenza has a population of 63,240, of which 47.2% are male and 52.8% are female, compared to the national average of 49.0% and 51.0% respectively. Minors make up 14.6% of the population, and seniors make up 25.4%, compared to the national average of 14.9% and 24.7% respectively.

=== Immigration ===
As of 2025, the foreign-born population is 5,139, making up 8.1% of the total population. The 5 largest foreign nationalities are Romanians (693), Filipinos (643), Ukrainians (474), Moroccans (273) and Germans (164).

== Main sights ==
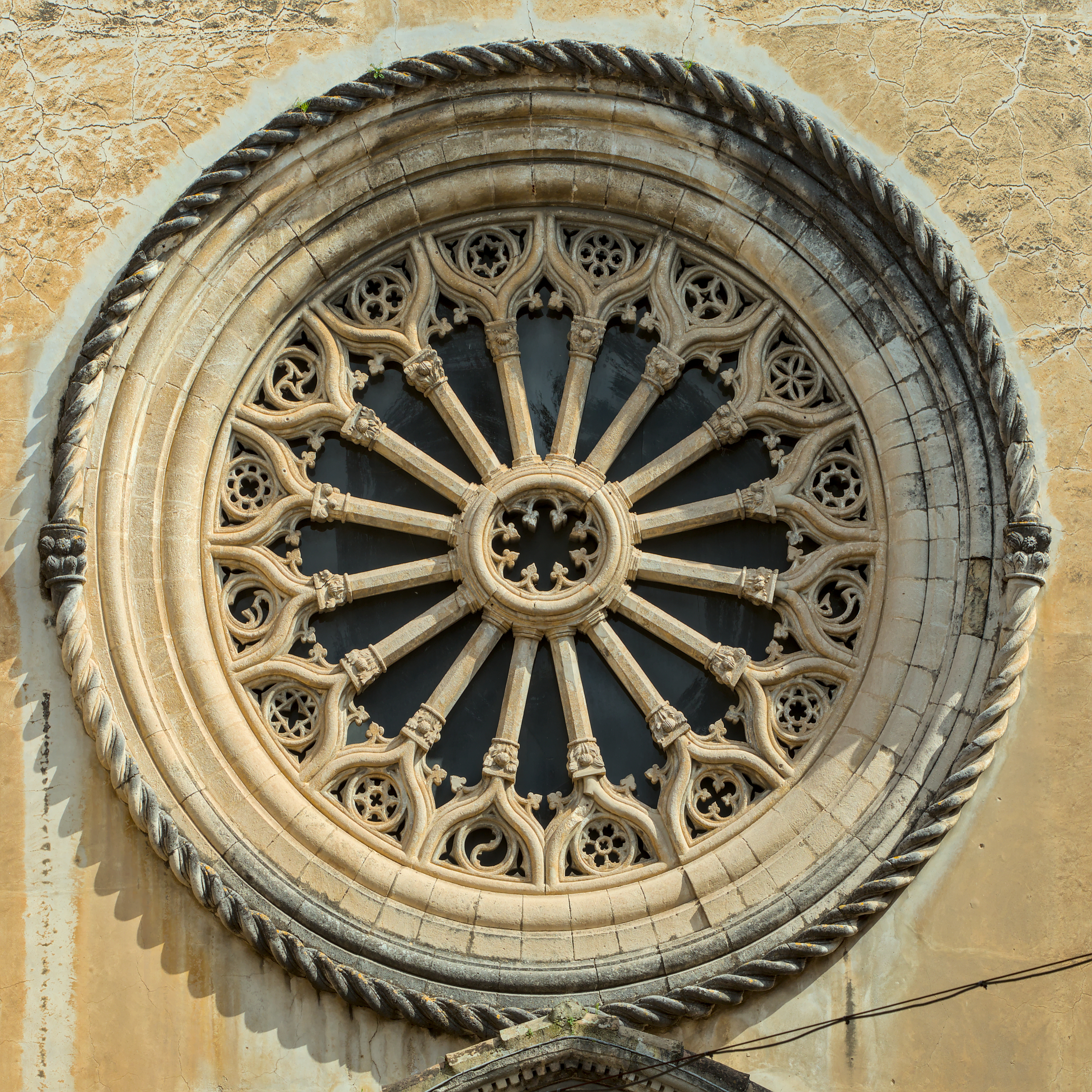
Rose window of the church of San Domenico

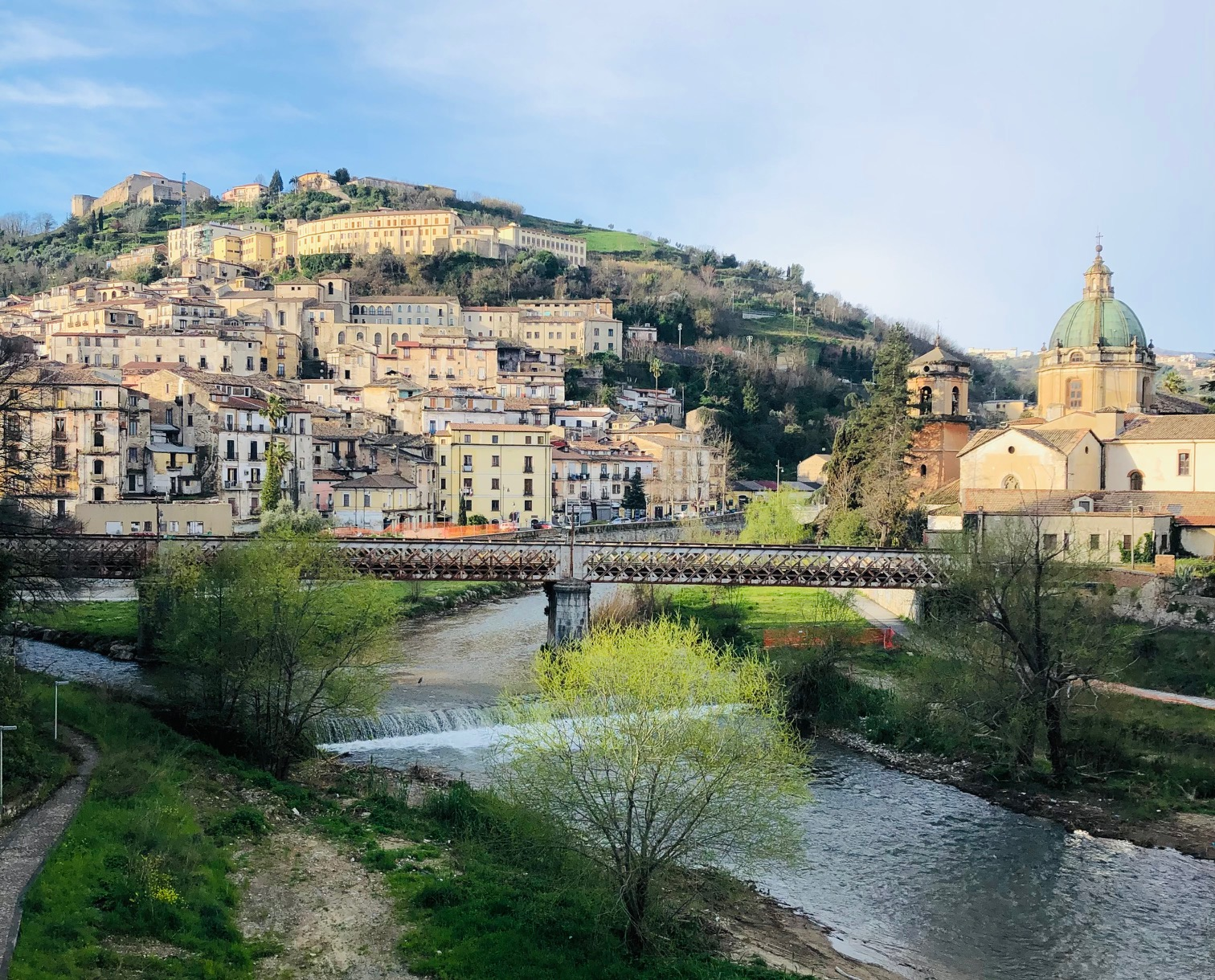
View of the old town

=== Church of San Domenico ===
Founded in 1448, the Church of San Domenico combines Medieval and Renaissance architectural elements. Its most interesting feature is the rose window defined by 16 little tuff columns. The wooden portal (1614) is inlaid with floral motifs, figures of saints, and coats of arms.

Inside the church are works by the sanfilese painter Antonio Granata, such as the canvas depicting the Madonna of the Rosary between Saints Dominic and Agnese da Montepulciano preserved in the ancient choir used today as a sacristy in the church (late eighteenth century). The high altar is made of polychrome marble (1767). In the transept, there is a Deposition and a San Vincenzo Ferreri (late eighteenth century, anonymous). The sacristy is noted for its ribbed vault, a double lancet window with a narrow arch, and a wooden choir installed in 1635.

=== The Cathedral ===
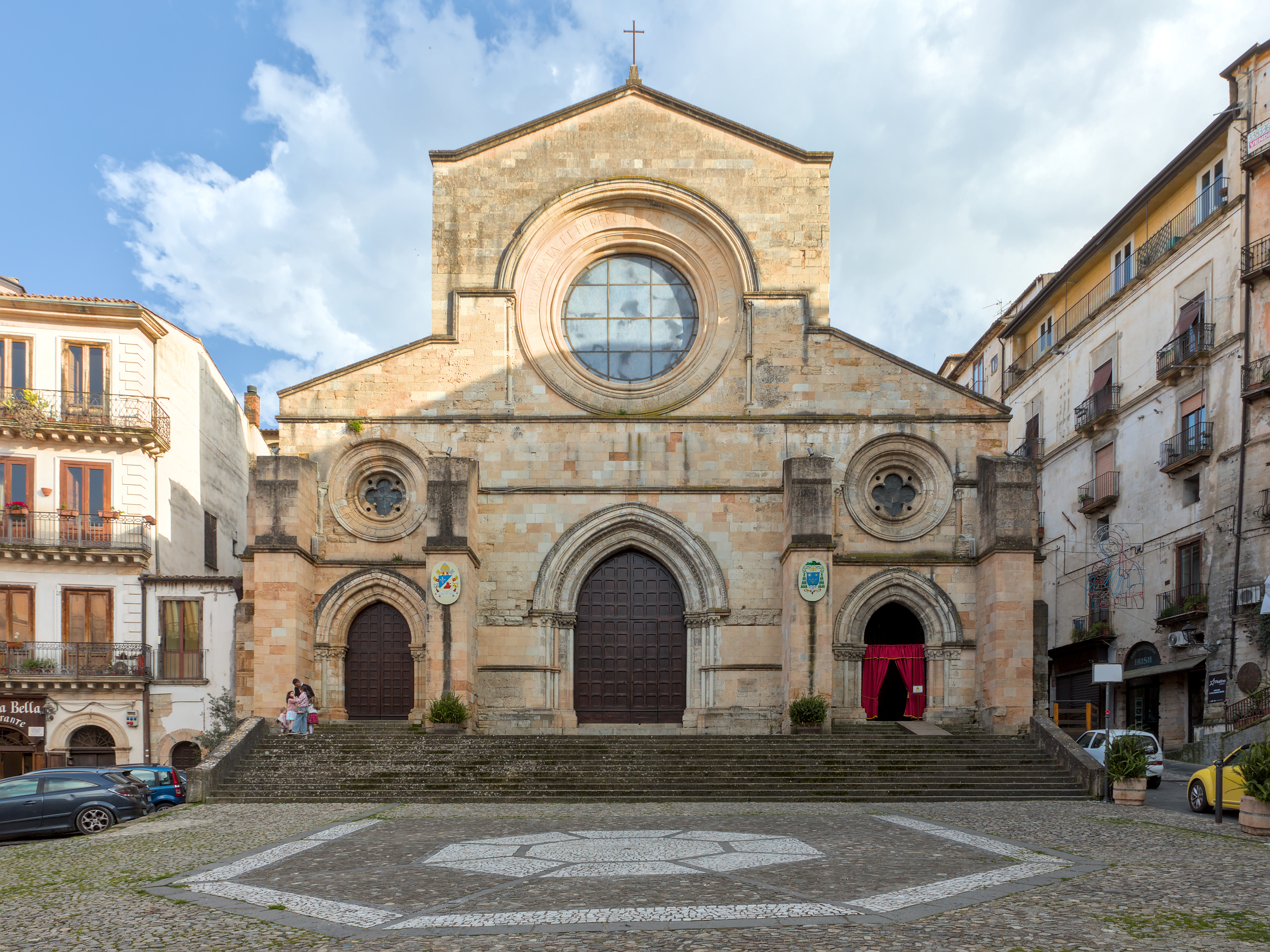
Façade of the Cathedral

The exact origins of the Duomo (Cathedral of Santa Maria Assunta) are unknown; it was probably built during the first half of the eleventh century. An earthquake destroyed the cathedral on 9 June 1184, and rebuilding was completed by 1222, when the cathedral was consecrated by Emperor Frederick II. At some point during the first half of the eighteenth century the church was covered by a baroque superstructure that obliterated the original structure and its works of art. In the first half of the nineteenth century the façade was transformed in neo-gothic style, which completely changed its character. At the end of the nineteenth century, Archbishop Camillo Sorgente entrusted restoration work to Pisanti, who recovered the original old arches and the ancient structure of the church. In the 1940s the work was finally completed.

The tomb of Isabella of Aragon, wife of king Philip III of France is in the transept. A long aisle links the Duomo to the palace of the archbishop, the Palazzo Arcivescovile, which houses an Immacolata by Luca Giordano. One can also see a rare and precious Stauroteca. A Stauroteca is a relic containing fragments of wood from the cross of Christ. It generally has a rectangular and flat rectangular cross or rectangular tee with cruciform recipe used to guard the relic. It was a gift from Emperor Frederick II to the Duomo upon consecration. The work was produced in workshops of the royal goldsmiths, better known as "Tiraz", in a cultural environment blending Arabic, Byzantine, and Western cultural elements.

=== Monastero delle Vergini ===
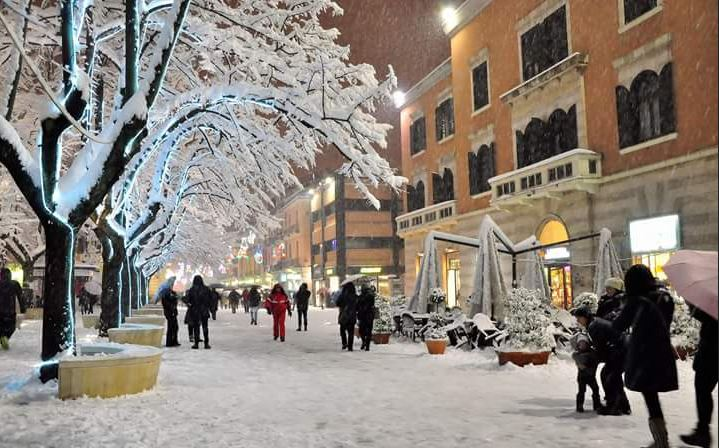
Piazza XI Settembre in the snow

The "Convent of the Virgins" stands in via Gaetano Argento. The external part of the main entrance is made of decorated tuff, while the internal part is carved of wood. The convent contains a sixteenth-century painting of the Annunciation. In front of it, is the thirteenth-century Madonna del Pilerio attributed to Giovanni da Taranto, while on the walls are four other anonymous sixteenth-century paintings: the Visitation, the Circumcision, the Adoration of the Shepherds, and the Adoration of the Magi. In the apse is the altarpiece Transit of the Virgin (1570). The cymatium houses a painting portraying the Coronation of the Virgin, while at the base of the two columns are paintings of two unidentified saints that are attributed to Michele Curia, the "Master of Montecalvario". The wooden choir dates to the seventeenth century.

=== Giostra Vecchia ===
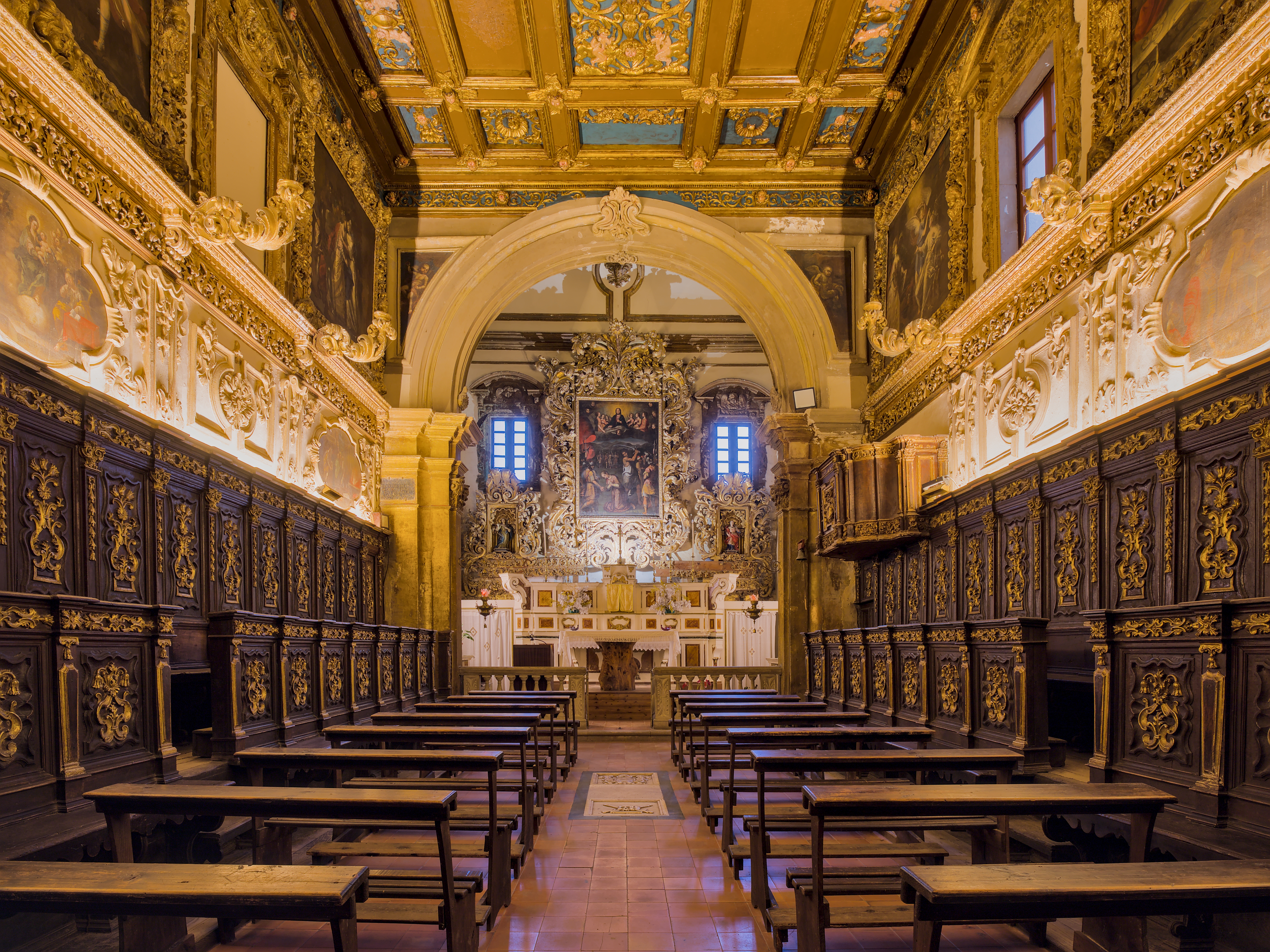
Chapel of Saint Catherine of Alexandria, inside St Francis of Assisi church

In the fifteenth century, at Palazzo Falvo the Renaissance was introduced at Cosenza, in the Giostra Vecchia. Here are located the church and monastery of Saint Francis of Assisi. The Latin cross plan has a nave and two aisles. In the nave stands the impressive high wooden altar built in 1700. Above it is a painting by Daniele Russo representing the Perdono d’Assisi (1618). The left aisle is home to a wooden seventeenth-century crucifix, the altar of the Madonna della Febbre and the statue of the Madonna with Child, in marble, dating to the sixteenth century. The sacristy has a painted wooden ceiling, a wooden armadio representing episodes from the Passion of Christ, and paintings of saints and Franciscan friars. The stone arch is characterized by the painting of St. Francis of Paola, while on the walls are some frescoes dating to the beginning of the fifteenth century.

=== Hohenstaufen Castle ===
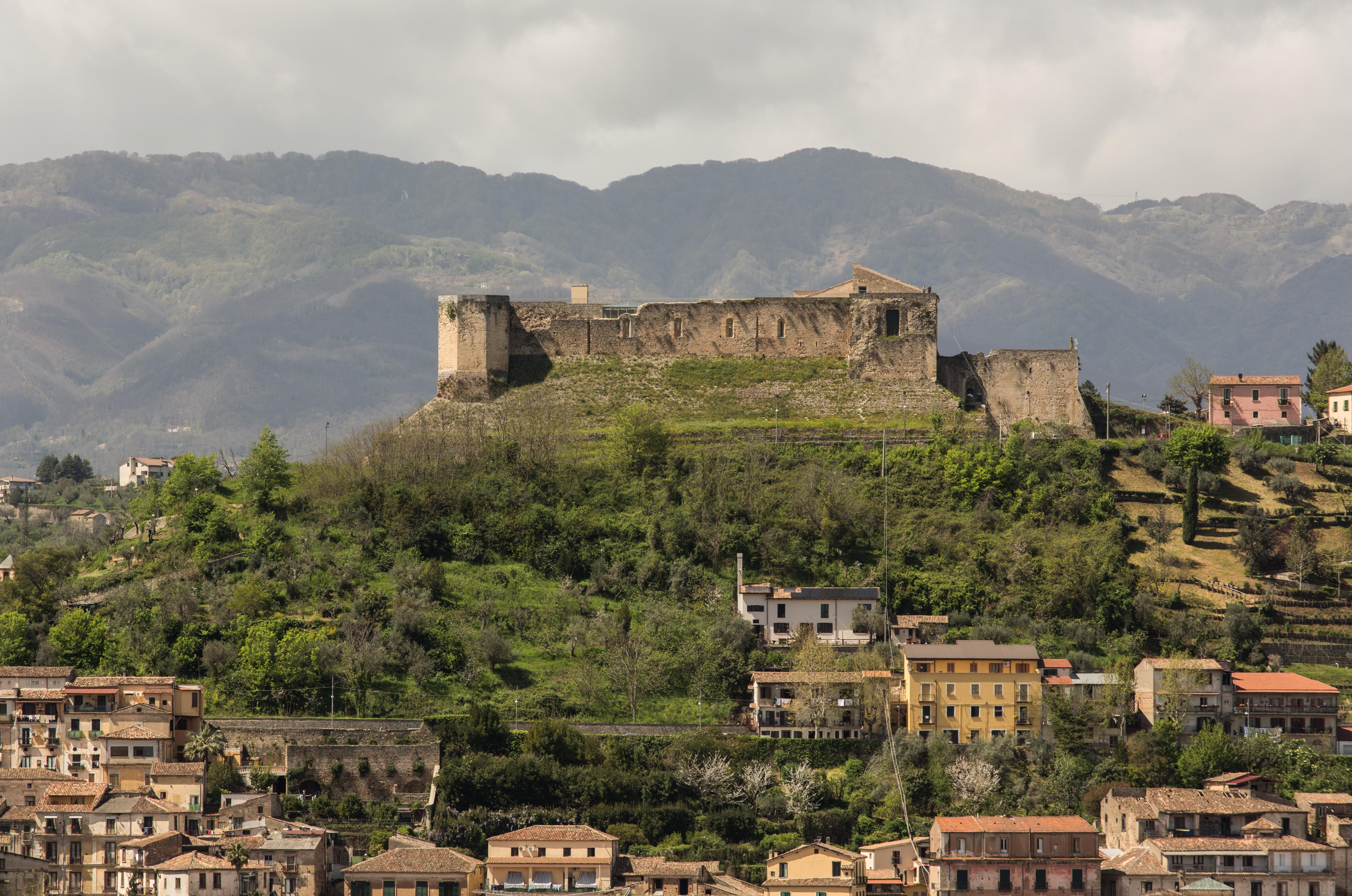
Hohenstaufen Castle

The Castello Svevo ("Swabian" or Hohenstaufen Castle) was originally built by the Saracens on the ruins of the ancient Rocca Brutia, around the year 1000. The castle was restored by Frederick II, Holy Roman Emperor, adding the octagonal tower to the original structure, in 1239. According to tradition, his son Henry lived in this castle, as a prisoner at his father's command. Louis III of Naples and Margaret of Savoy married in the castle and they both settled there in 1432.

All signs of the ancient Saracen structure have now disappeared. In the internal cloister, the modifications made by the Bourbons in order to convert it into a prison can also be seen. The entrance-hall is covered by ogival arches with engraved brackets. A wide corridor is dominated by some fleur-de-lis from the House of Anjou coat of arms. They are engraved on the ribbed Hohenstaufen arches.

=== Spirito Santo ===
The church of Sant'Agostino, also known as the Spirito Santo, was built in 1507 by the Augustinians. The original portal has several inscriptions in Gothic characters. The interior has a series of paintings from the eighteenth century. Further on a narrow street leads to the so-called “Area of the Bandiera Brothers”, the Vallone di Rovito. Here, the insurrectionist patriots of 1844 were executed by a firing squad.

=== San Francesco di Paola ===
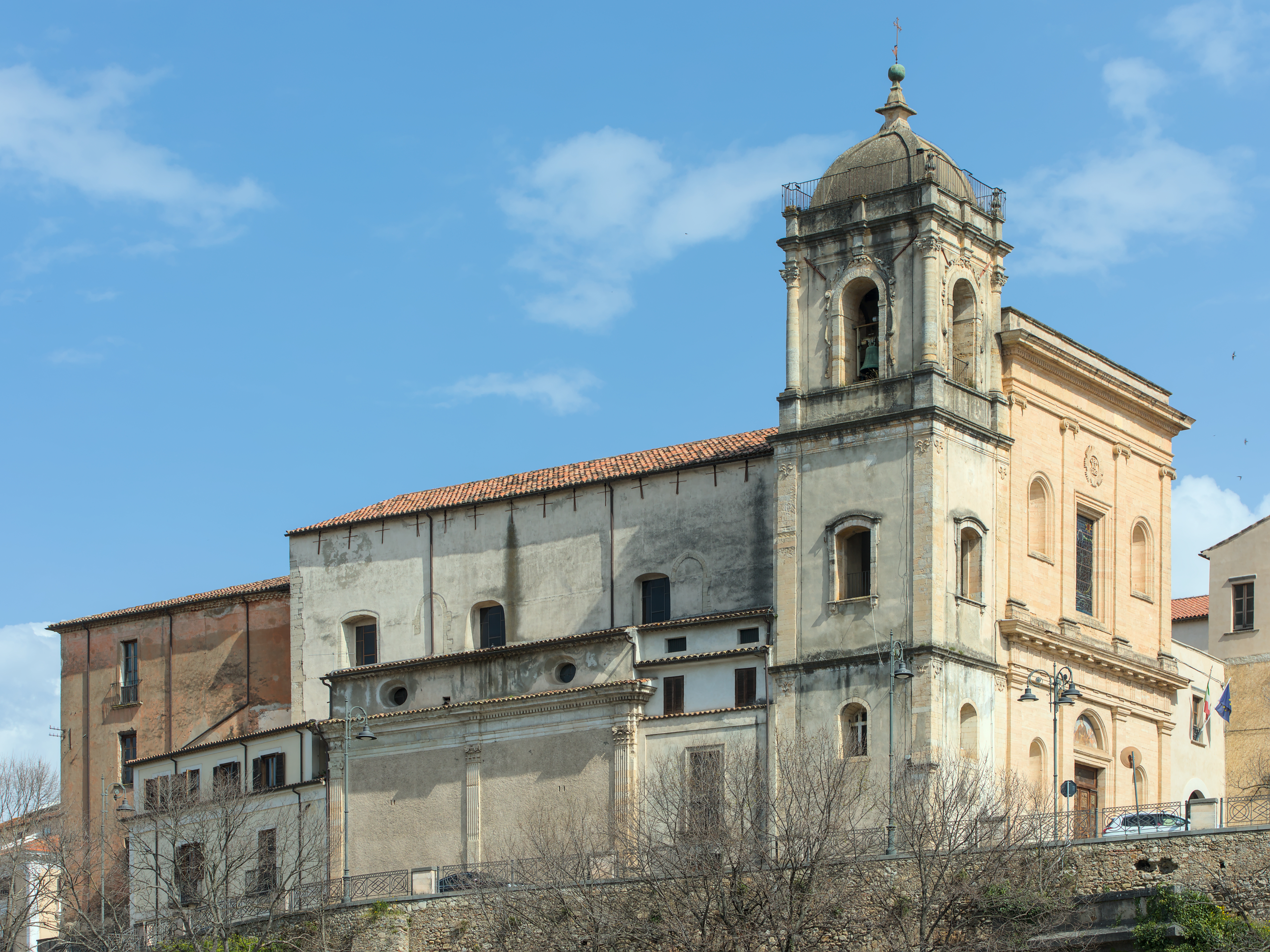
Church of San Francesco di Paola

In the Arenella, are the church and monastery of Saint Francis of Paola (1510). The interior, with a single nave, houses the tomb of Ottavio Cesare Gaeta. On the right wall, are two eighteenth-century paintings: a Sacra Famiglia and Madonna con San Francesco e Sant’Agostino. On an altar is a wooden statue of Saint Francis of Paola; while on the left side of the nave, on another altar, is a wooden statue of San Michele Arcangelo. The Madonna with Child in Glory and Saints Paul and Luke (1551) was painted by Pietro Negroni. In the apse, a sixteenth-century triptych made by Cristoforo Faffeo represents the Madonna and Child in glory with saints Catherine and Sebastian. At the back of the altar is a wooden choir built in 1679 by M. Domenico Costanzo da Rogliano. On the wall of the sacristy are remains of frescoes dating back to 1550–1600. On the vault are some pastels representing scenes from the life of the Saint from Paola.

=== San Salvatore ===
The small church of San Salvatore serves the parish that professes the Byzantine-Albanian faith. Inside the nave are a wooden ceiling, some frescoes of the Apostoli, of the Salvatore, and of the Madonna, as well as a splendid iconostasis.

=== Open Air Museum ===
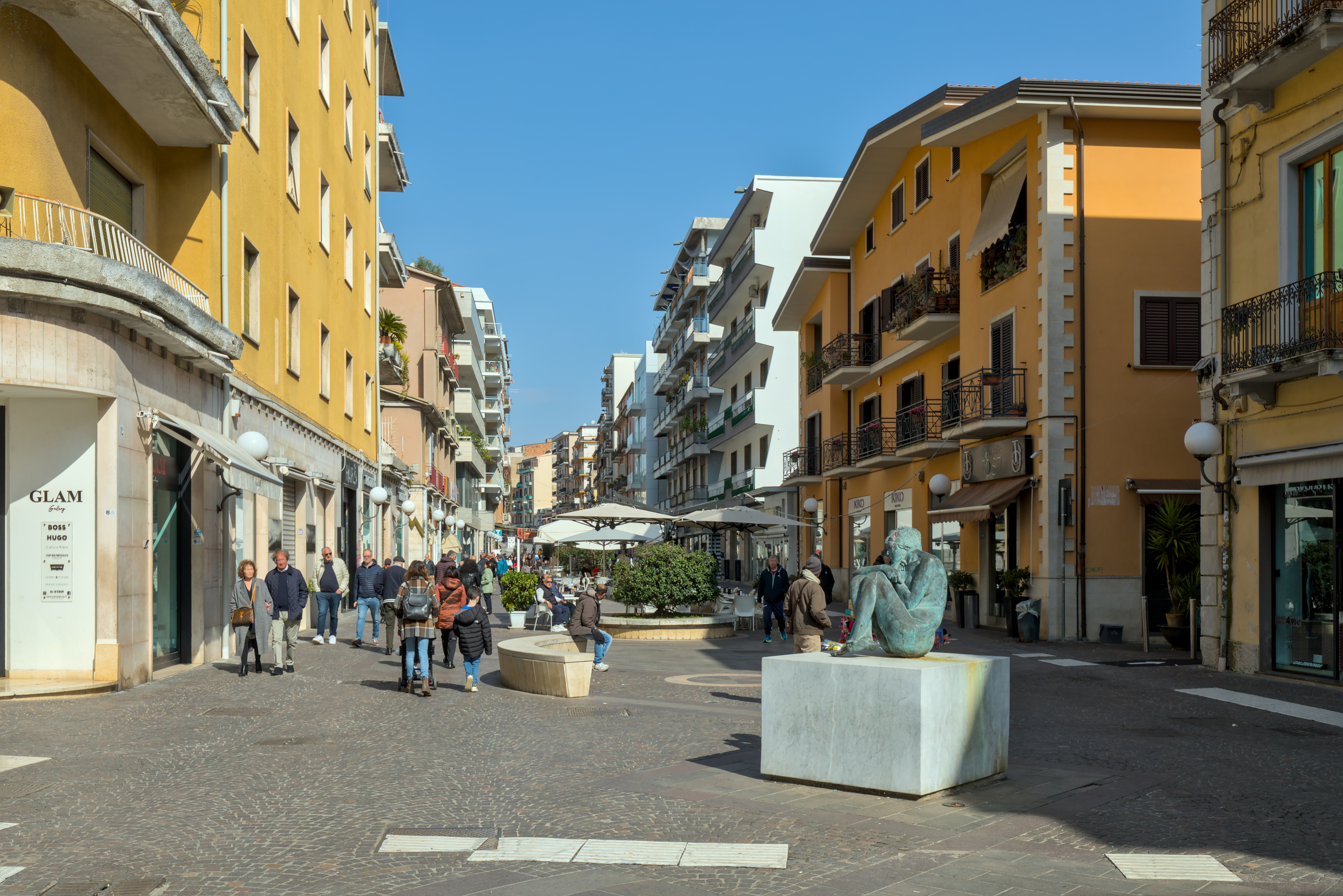
Corso Mazzini, with statues part of the open-air "Museo MAB"

In the modern part of Cosenza, in an area stretching from the pedestrianized Corso Mazzini to Piazza Bilotti, lies the open-air "Museo MAB" (Museo all'aperto Bilotti). The museum hosts a wide range of modern art sculptures that stand in the street for residents and tourists. The sculptures were donated to the city by the Italian-American entrepreneur and art collector, Carlo Bilotti. They include Saint George and the Dragon by Salvador Dalí, Hector and Andromache by Giorgio de Chirico, "the Bronzes" by Sacha Sosno, The Bather by Emilio Greco, The Cardinal by Giacomo Manzù, and various marble sculptures by Pietro Consagra.

=== Museums and cultural institutions ===
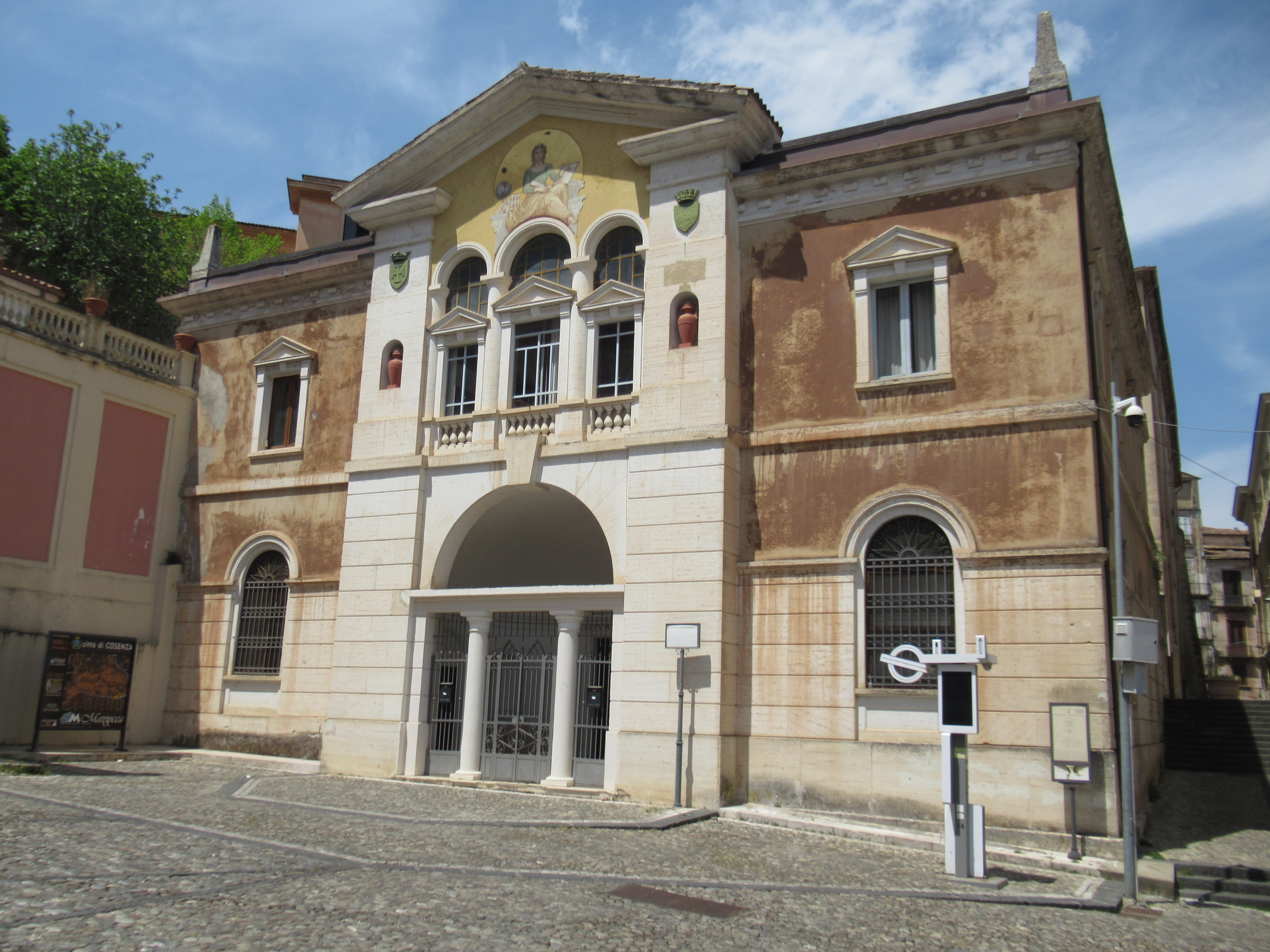
Cosentian Academy, now Public Library.

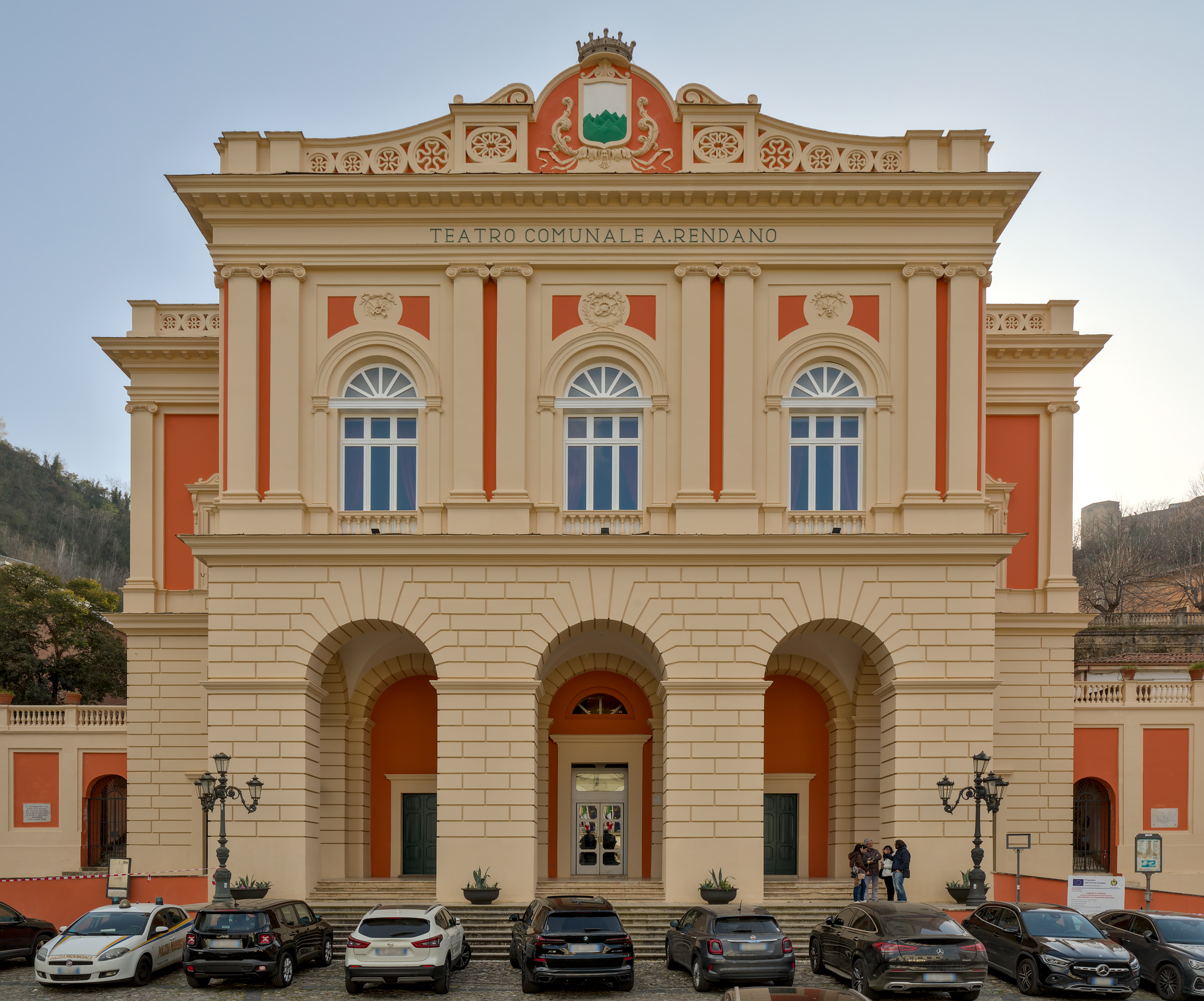
Rendano Theatre.

- National Gallery - Palazzo Arnone
- Civic Archeological Museum
- Remembrance Museum
- Bilotti Open Air Museum
- Rendano Theatre
- Morelli Theatre
- Acquario Theatre
- Cosentian Academy
- University of Calabria
- Music Conservatoire
- State Archive Library
- Civic Public Library
- National Library
- Antonio Guarasci Foundation Library
- Calabria Jazz Centre Recordings Archive
- Theological Library (Seminario Cosentino)
- Cultural and Ethno-Anthropological Heritage Archive

== Sports ==
Cosenza is home to Serie C football team Cosenza Calcio.

== Notable people ==
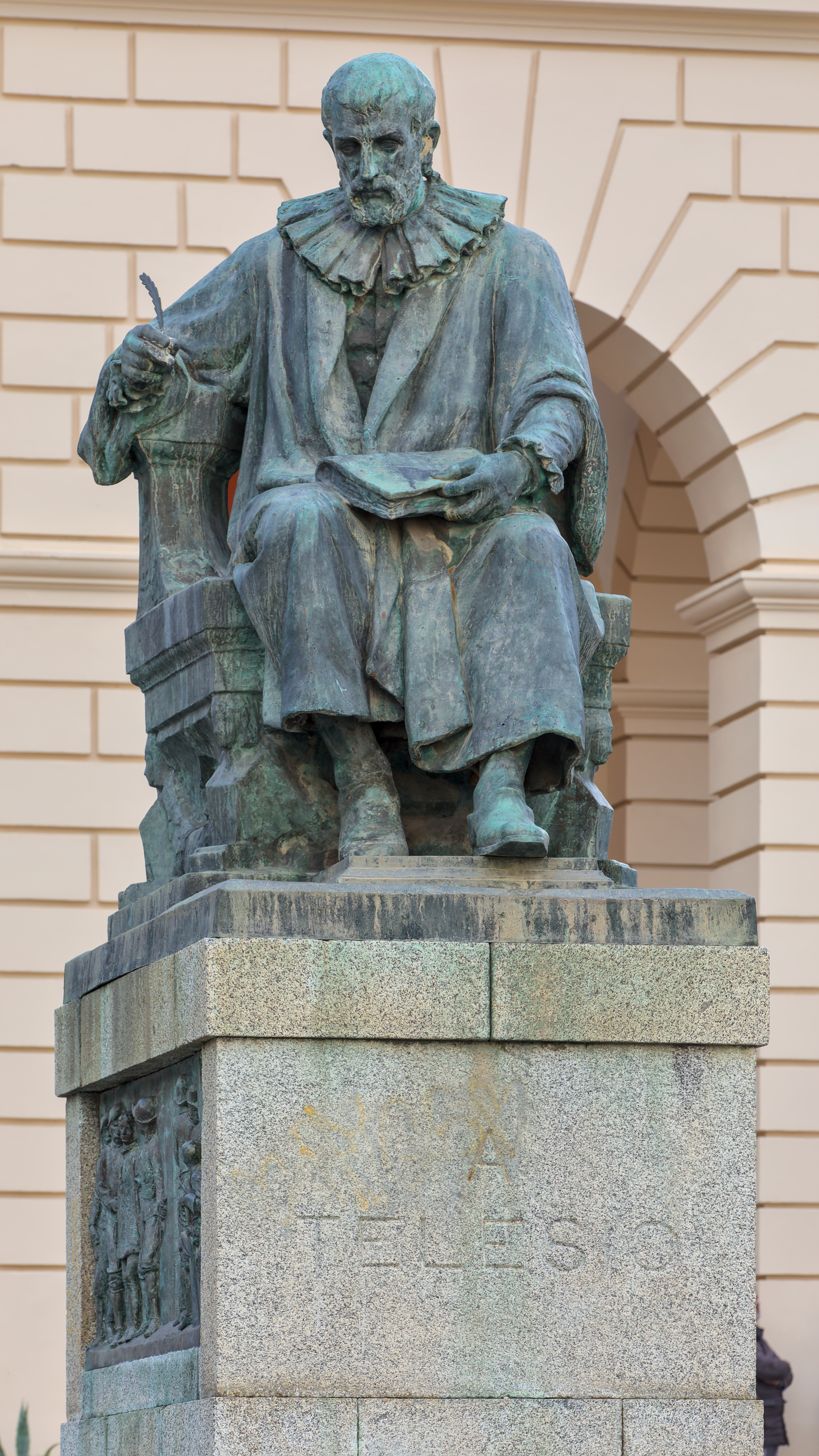
Statue of Bernardino Telesio.

- Joachim of Fiore (c.1135–1202), theologian
- Aulo Giano Parrasio (1470–1521), humanist
- Bernardino Telesio (1509–1588), philosopher
- Pietro Negroni (1505–1565), painter
- Antonio Serra (late 1500s), economist
- Sertorio Quattromani (1541–1607), philosopher
- Niccolò Pasquali (1717/18–1757), musician
- Francis Pasquali (fl.1743–1795), musician
- Francesco Saverio Salfi (1759–1832), writer
- Giovanni Antonio Palazzo (17th-century), writer
- Nicola Misasi (1850–1923), writer
- Alfonso Rendano (1853–1931), pianist
- Alessandro Longo (1864–1945), composer
- Pietro Mancini (1876–1968), politician
- Tony Gaudio (1883–1951), cinematographer
- Fausto Gullo (1887–1974), politician
- Giacomo Mancini (1916–2002), politician
- Stefano Rodotà (1933–2017), politician
- Tony Parisi (1941–2000), wrestler
- Sandra Savaglio (born 1967), astrophysicist
- Roberto Occhiuto (born 1969), politician
- Mark Iuliano (born 1973), former football player
- Maria Perrotta (born 1974), classical pianist
- Stefano Fiore (born 1975), former football player
- Simone Perrotta (born 1977), former football player
- Brunori Sas (born 1977), singer, song writer
- Gennaro Gattuso (born 1978), former football player
- Maria Perrusi (born 1991), model
- Egor Tropeano (born 1992), winter swimmer
- Domenico Berardi (born 1994), football player
- Giovanni Tocci (born 1994), diver
- Antonio Fuoco (born 1996), racing driver

== International relations ==
=== Twin towns – sister cities ===
Cosenza is twinned with:

- Kenosha, Wisconsin, United States, since 1979
- Lansing, Michigan, United States, since 2000
- Sault Ste. Marie, Ontario, Canada, since 2010

== Gallery ==
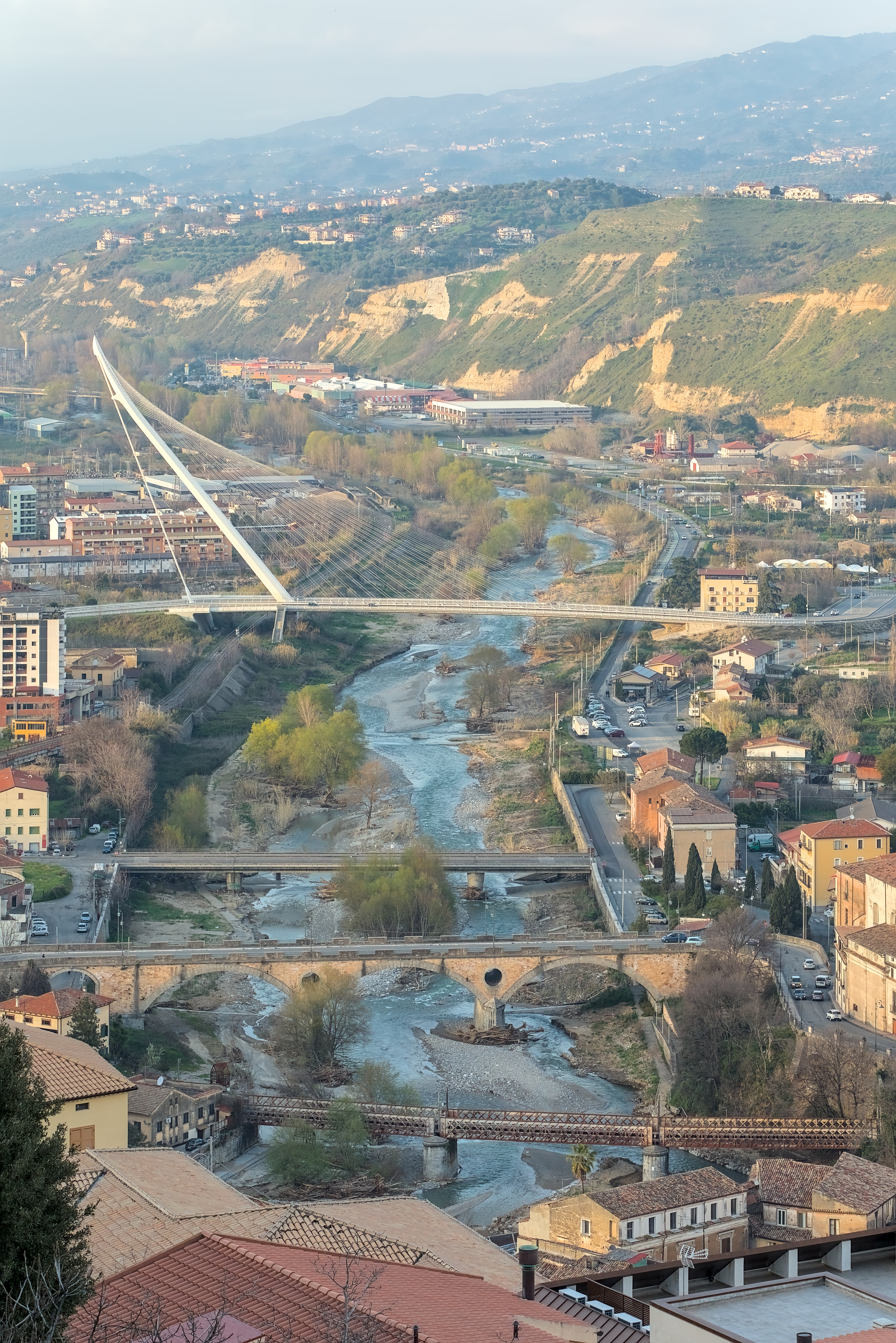
St Francis bridge and the Crati river, as seen from the castle

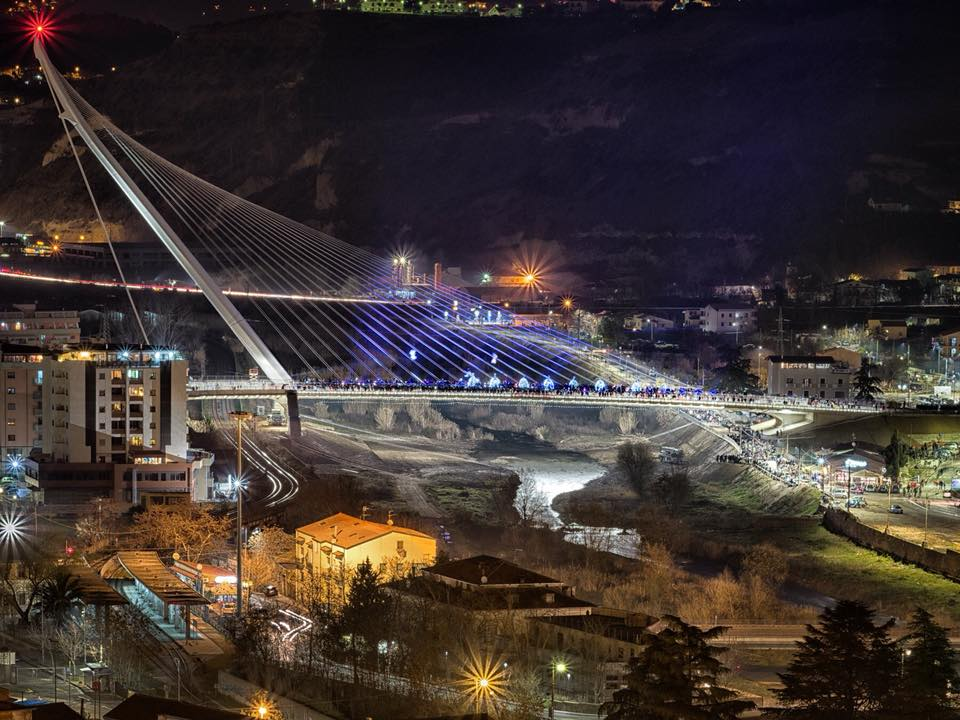
St Francis Bridge

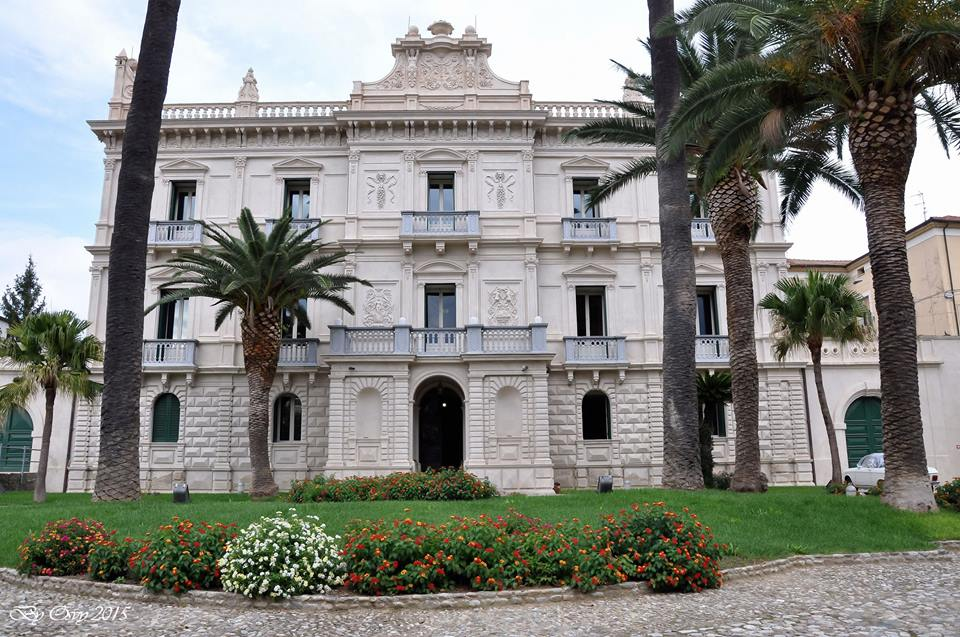
Villa Rendano

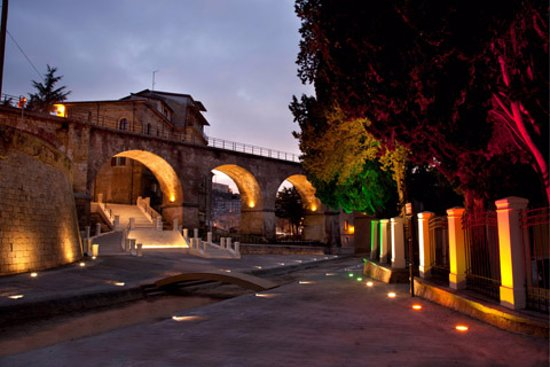
Altar to the Bandiera Brothers

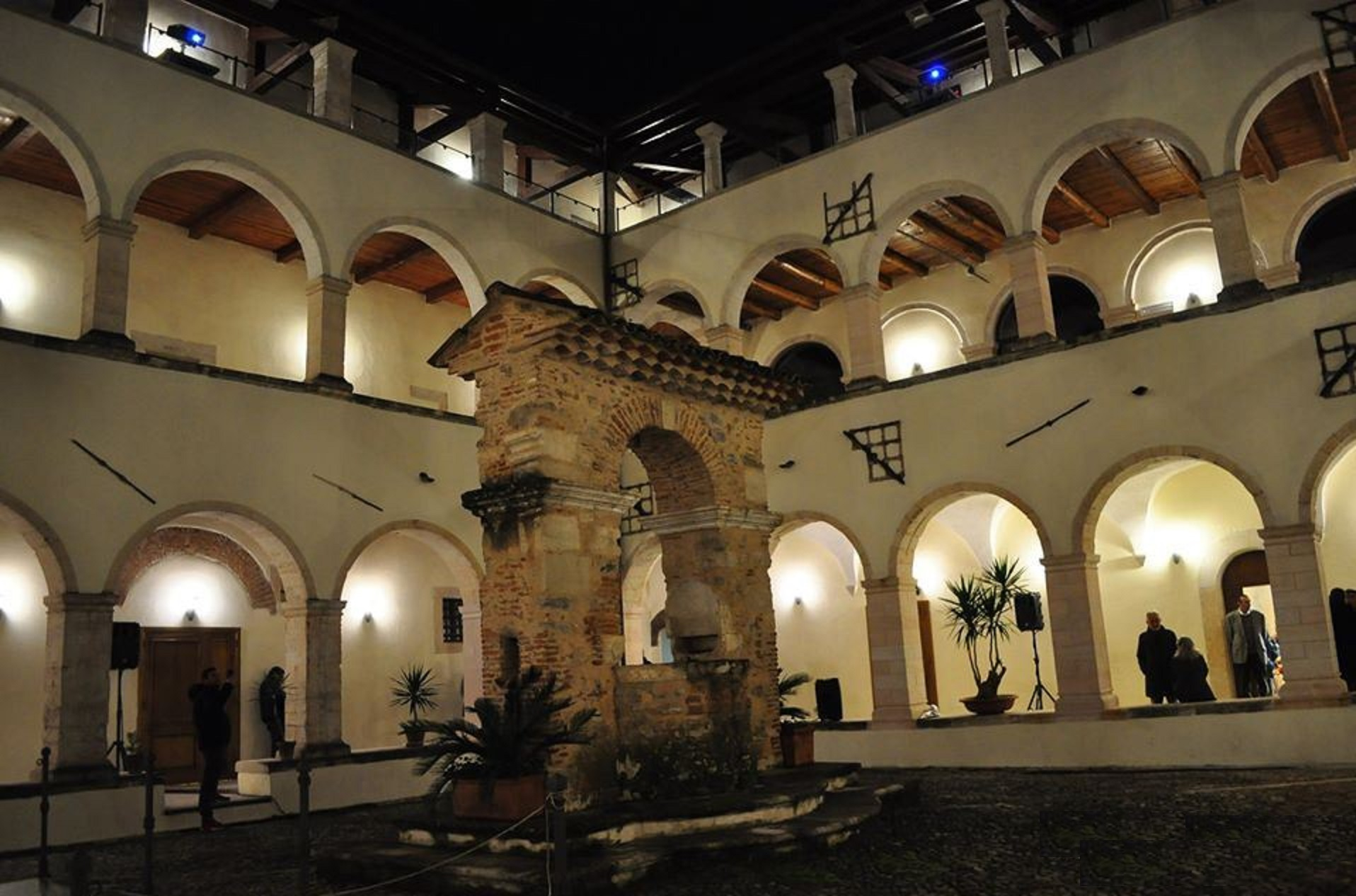
St. Augustine Monument

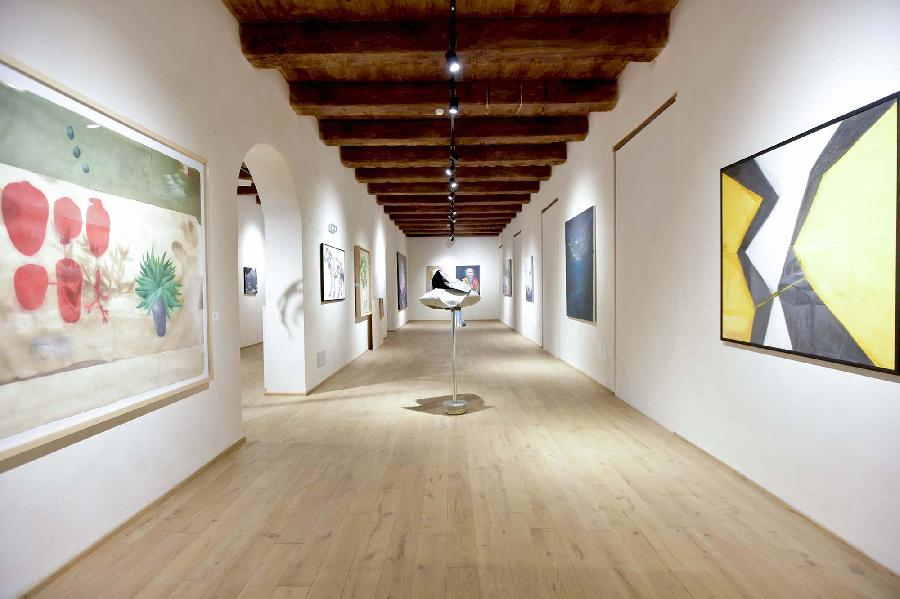
Interior of the BoCs Art Museum

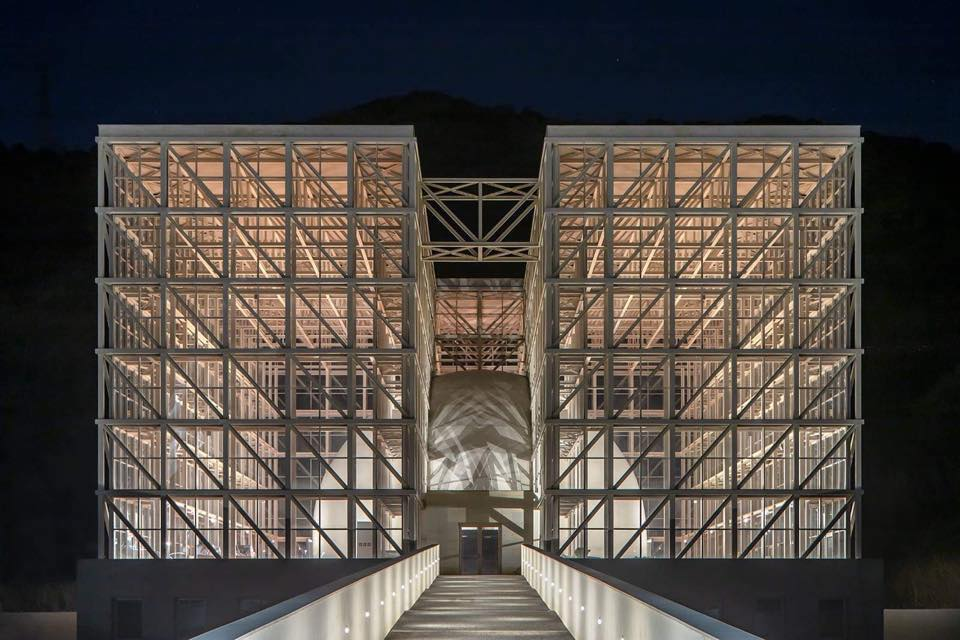
Planetary

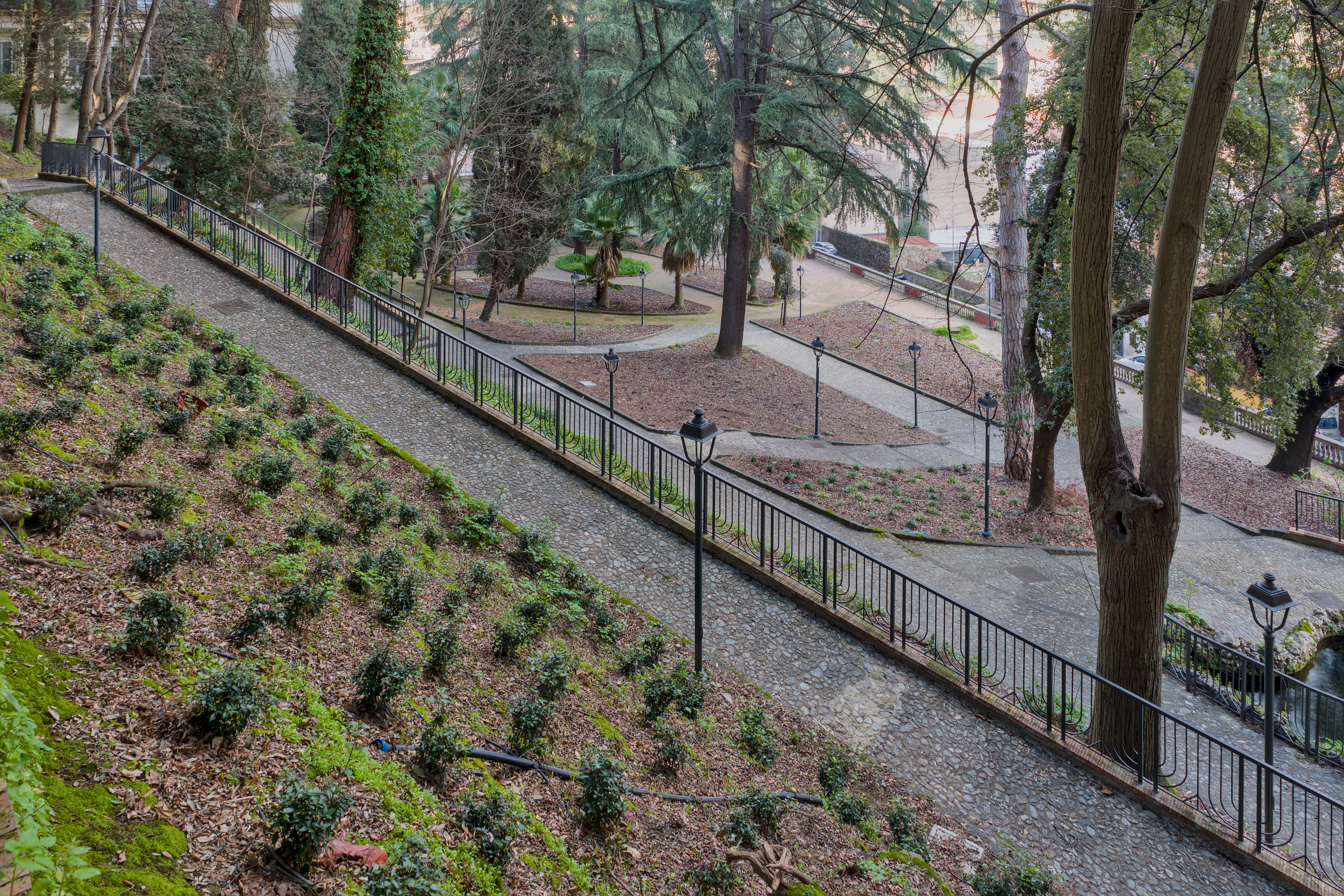
Villa Vecchia, a public garden on the slopes of the old town
