= Aulo Giano Parrasio =

Italian humanist

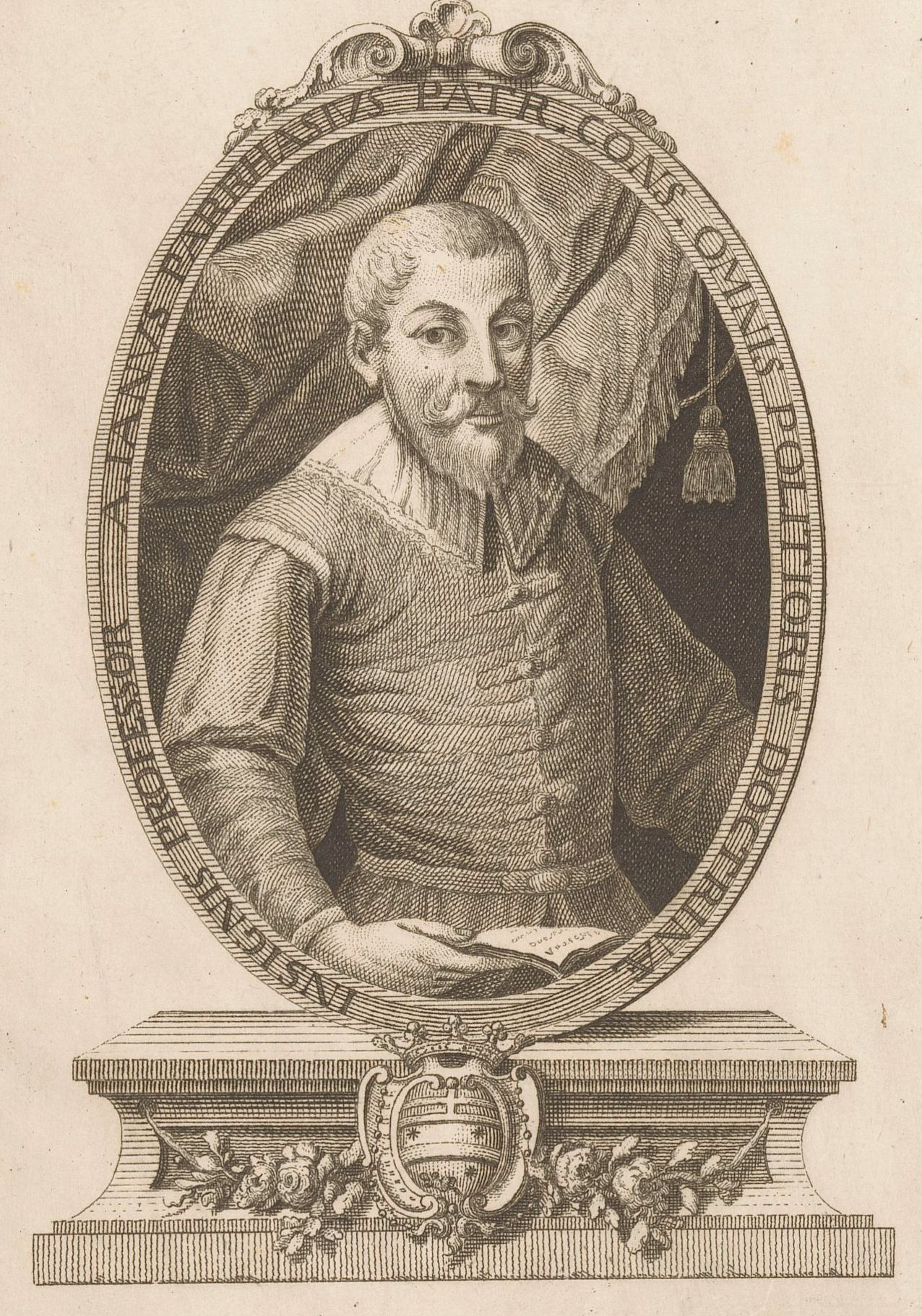
Aulo Giano Parrasio

Giovan Paolo Parisio (1470–1522), who used the classicised pseudonym Aulo Giano Parrasio or Aulus Janus Parrhasius, was a humanist scholar and grammarian from Cosenza, in Calabria in southern Italy. He was thus sometimes known as "Cosentius". He was a member of the Accademia Pontaniana of Naples, and founded the Accademia Cosentina, an accademia or learned society in Cosenza, in 1511–12.

He was resident in Milan in the first years of the sixteenth century, and was noted as a teacher. He married a daughter of Demetrius Chalcondyles.

He is known for his commentary on the De Raptu Proserpinae of Claudian. Some letters of his on philology were later published, in 1567, as Liber De rebus epistolam quaesitis. His book Oratio ad Patritios Neapolitanos was dedicated to the Italian humanist Antonio Seripando (1476–1531), the brother of the Augustinian friar Girolamo Seripando and the beloved disciple of Master Francesco Pucci.
