= Accademia Cosentina =

Coordinates: 39°17′12″N 16°15′42″E

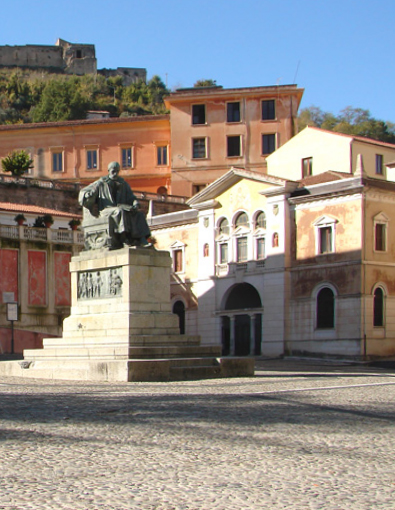
- The accademia, with the statue of Bernardino Telesio in front of it
- Named after: Cosenza
- Formation: 1511–12
- Purpose: learned society
- Headquarters: Piazza XV Marzo 7, Cosenza
- Official language: Italian
- Key people: Bernardino Telesio; Sertorio Quattromani; Giovanni Battista Costanzo; Giuseppe Sanfelice; Pirro Schettini; Gaetano Greco; Matteo Galdi
- Formerly called: Accademia Parrasiana; Accademia Telesiana; Accademia dei Costanti; Accademia dei Negligenti; Accademia dei Pescatori Cratilidi; Istituto Cosentino

The Accademia Cosentina ("Cosentian Academy" or "Telesian Academy" in English) is still an Italian accademia or learned society in Cosenza, Italy. It was founded in 1511–12 by Aulo Giano Parrasio and has a long and complex history, with several changes of name.

== History ==
The society was founded in Cosenza by Giovan Paolo Parisio ("Aulo Giano Parrasio") in late 1511 or early 1512, and was initially known as the "Accademia Parrasiana". As in other accademie of the time, the principal studies were of literature and philology.

Following the death of Parrasio, which may have been in 1522 or in 1534, the academy came under the control of Bernardino Telesio, who gave it a more scientific and practical direction; it was known as the "Accademia Telesiana". In 1544 it was suppressed by the authorities.

Not long before Telesio died in 1588, the society came under the direction of Sertorio Quattromani and was renamed the "Accademia Cosentina". It is not clear whether it had been active from the closure of 1544 to this time.

The accademia was again closed down in about 1593. In 1608 Giovanni Battista Costanzo, the archbishop of Cosenza, re-opened the society as the Accademia dei Costanti, with a larger number of members from the church. It may have become inactive again after his death in 1617.

Another archbishop, Giuseppe Sanfelice, founded the Accademia dei Negligenti in about 1649; it remained active until his death in 1660.

The Accademia dei Costanti was revived by Pirro Schettini from 1668 until 1678, when he died.

It was restarted under the name Accademia dei Pescatori Cratilidi by Gaetano Greco in 1756, but again became inactive in 1794.

In 1811 the society was again revived, through the efforts of Matteo Angelo Galdi; it was called the Istituto Cosentina until 1817, when royal permission was obtained to change the name to Accademia Cosentina.

On 11 June 1871 the Accademia Cosentina founded the Biblioteca Civica, the public library of Cosenza, which remained inactive until it was officially inaugurated on 4 March 1898.

In March 2012 the academy announced that it might have to cease all activity because of a total lack of funds; it had received €2000 in ministerial funding in 2008.

The Accademia Cosentina continues to operate, despite economic difficulties due to the lack of public subsidies, and continues its cultural promotion work, with monthly events and conferences on literary, humanistic and scientific subjects.
