= Antonio Serra =

16th-century Italian philosopher and economist

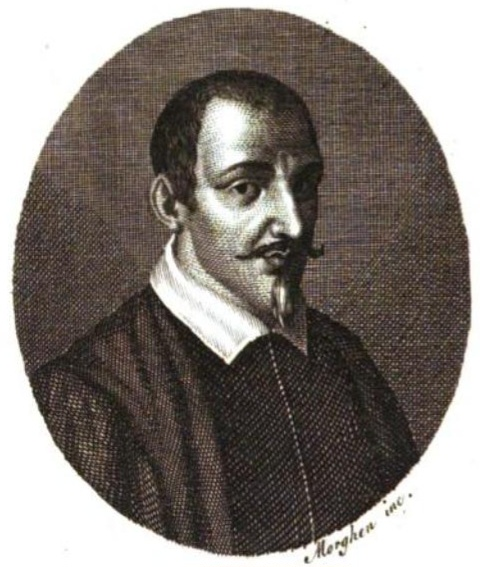
Engraved portrait of Antonio Serra by Raffaello Morghen

Antonio Serra was a late 16th-century Italian philosopher and economist in the mercantilist tradition.

== Biography ==
Little is known about Serra's life. He was born in Cosenza in the late 16th century (the dates of his birth and death are unknown). When working in Naples, he applied himself to solving the enormous social and economic problems created by the Spanish viceroy system. In 1613 Serra was jailed for unknown reasons but possibly due to his involvement in a conspiracy with the philosopher Tommaso Campanella attempting to free Calabria from the Spanish domination.

In his treatise, Breve trattato delle cause che possono far abbondare li regni d’oro e d’argento dove non sono miniere, Serra analysed the causes of the shortage of coin in the Kingdom of Naples and the factors that could have reversed this economic trend. He was the first to analyse and fully understand the concept of balance of trade for both visible goods and invisible services and capital movements. He explained how the shortage of coin in the Kingdom of Naples was due to balance of payments deficit. Using his findings he was able to reject the popular idea at the time that the scarcity in money was due to the exchange rate. The solution to the problem was found in the active encouragement of exports.

He also found the cause of difference between poor Naples and rich Venice in that Venice had industry with increasing returns while Naples only had agriculture and primitive artisanry with no such advantages.

== English translations ==
- Serra, Antonio (1613), A Short Treatise on the Wealth and Poverty of Nations edited by Sophus A. Reinert (2011), Anthem Press ISBN 978-0-85728-973-5

== Sources ==
- Short biography (in Italian)
- Antonio Serra: A Neglected Herald of the Acquisitive System
