= Bandiera brothers =

Italian nationalists

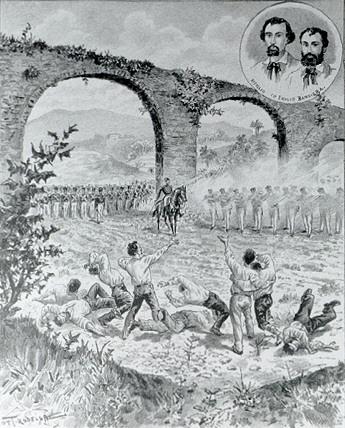
Execution of the Bandieras

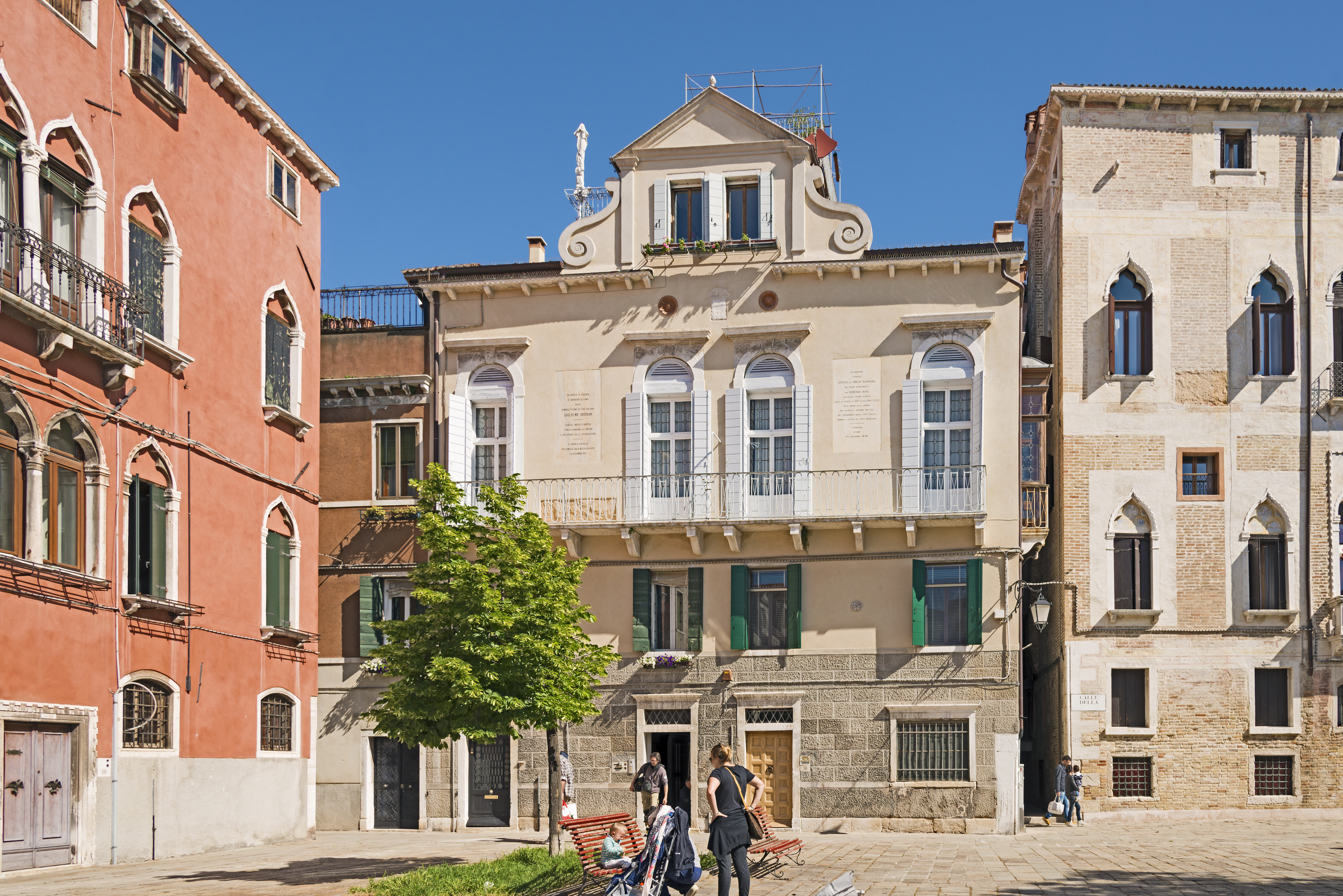
Palace Soderini, home of Attilio and Emilio Bandiera, facade in Campo Bandiera e Moro, Venice

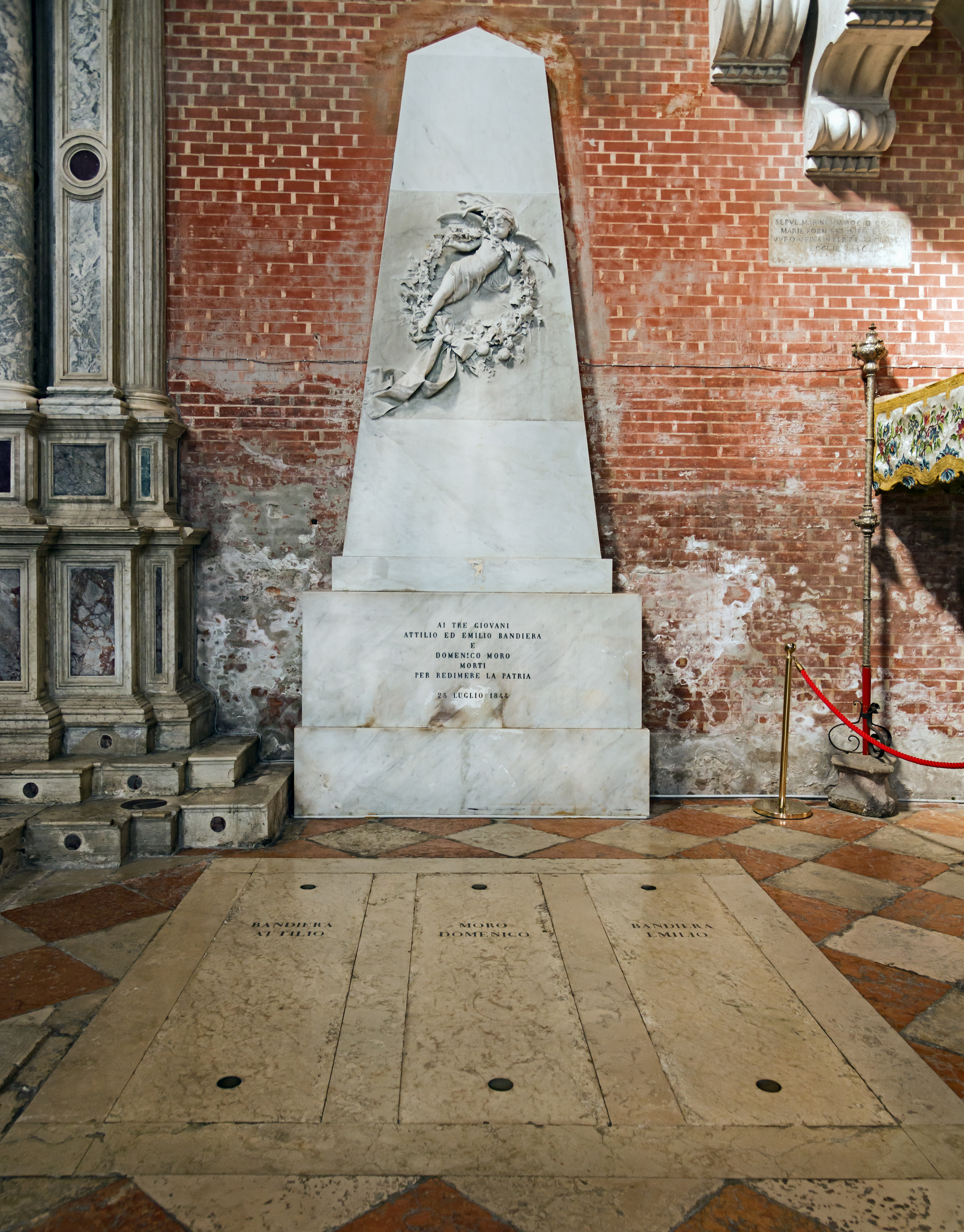
Tombs on Santi Giovanni e Paolo, Venice

The brothers Attilio (1811–1844) and Emilio Bandiera (1819–1844) were Italian nationalists during the Risorgimento.

== Background ==
Emilio was born in Venice and Attilio was born in Spalato: both were sons of Baron Francesco Bandiera, an admiral in the Austrian Navy, and were themselves members of that service. At an early age they were won over to the ideas of Italian unification, and corresponded with Giuseppe Mazzini and other members of the Giovine Italia, a patriotic revolutionary secret society.

During the year 1843 the air was full of different conspiracies and various other ill-starred attempts at nationalist uprisings were made. The Bandiera brothers spread propaganda among the officers and enlisted men of the Austrian navy, nearly all Italians, and planned to seize a warship to bombard the city of Messina. Having been betrayed by informants they fled to Corfu early in 1844.

== Events ==
Rumours reached them in Corfu of agitation in the Kingdom of the Two Sicilies, where the people were being represented as ready to rise en masse at the first appearance of a leader. The Bandiera brothers, encouraged by Mazzini, consequently determined to make a raid on the Calabrian coast. They assembled a band of about twenty men ready to sacrifice their lives, and set sail on their venture on 12 June 1844. Four days later they landed near Crotone, intending to go to Cosenza, liberate the political prisoners and issue their proclamations. Tragically for the Bandiera brothers, they did not find the insurgent band they were told awaited them, so they moved towards La Sila. They were ultimately betrayed by one of their party, the Corsican Boccheciampe, and by some calabrese peasants who believed them to be Turkish pirates.

A detachment of gendarmes and volunteers were sent against them, and after a short fight the whole band was taken prisoner and escorted to Cosenza, where a number of Calabrians who had taken part in a previous rising were also under arrest. First, the Calabrians were tried by court-martial, and a large number were condemned to death or the galleys. The raiders’ turn came next, and the whole party, save the traitor Boccheciampe, were condemned to be shot, but in the case of eight of them the sentence was commuted to the galleys. On 23 July the two Bandiera brothers and their nine companions were executed by firing squad; some accounts state they cried "Viva l’Italia!" (Long live Italy!) as they fell.

The remains of the Bandiera Brothers and of their companion Domenico Moro were brought back to Venice on 18 June 1867, following the liberation of that city after the Austro-Prussian War of 1866. The three remains are buried in the Church of Santi Giovanni e Paolo, Venice, at the Campo Santi Giovanni e Paolo, where the equestrian monument of Colleoni is located.

== Aftermath ==
The moral effect was enormous throughout Italy, the action of the authorities was universally condemned, and the martyrdom of the Bandiera brothers bore fruit in the subsequent revolutions. It also created a profound impression in Great Britain, where it was believed that the Bandiera brothers’ correspondence with Mazzini had been tampered with, and that information as to the proposed expedition had been forwarded to the Austro-Hungarian and Bourbon governments by their own Foreign Secretary Lord Aberdeen. This has been proven by way of diplomatic and Parliamentary records by the historian Salvo Mastellone, in his work Mazzni & Marx: Thoughts upon Democracy in Europe (Prager Publisher, 2003).
