= Giovanni Antonio Palazzo =

Italian writer

Giovanni Antonio Palazzo was an Italian writer on government and reason of state. Michel Foucault's 1977-1978 College de France lectures considered Palazzo's Discourse on Government and the true reason of state (1604), along with The Reason of State by Giovanni Botero, as examples of writings linking the art of government to reason of state in a new way around 1600.

== Life ==
Palazzo's years of birth and death are not known. Born in Cosenza, he worked as a lawyer in Naples. He became secretary to Don Fabrizio di Sangro, Duke of Vietri di Potenza.

== Works ==
- Discorso del governo e della ragion vera di stato, Naples: for G. B. Sottile, 1604. Republished Venice, 1606.

- Translated into French by Adrien de Vallières as Discours du gouvernement et de la raison vraye d'Estat (Douai: printed by De Bellire, 1611); and as Les politiques et vrays remèdes aux vices voluntaires qui se comettent ez cours et republiques (Douai: printed by De Bellire, 1662).
- Translated into Latin by Casparo Janthesius as Novi discursus de gubernaculo et vera status ratione nucleus (Danzig, 1637)
