= Bernardino Telesio =

Italian philosopher and natural scientist

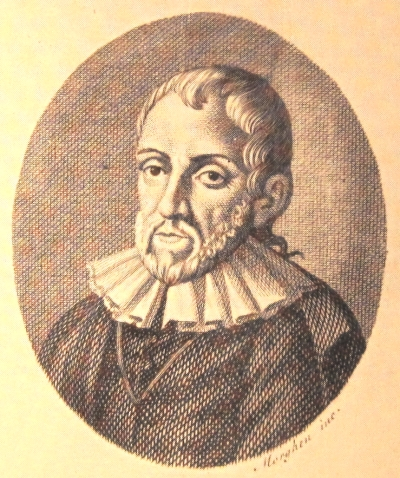
Bernardino Telesio

Bernardino Telesio (Italian: [bernarˈdiːno teˈlɛːzjo]; 7 November 1509 – 2 October 1588) was an Italian philosopher and natural scientist. While his natural theories were later disproven, his emphasis on observation made him the "first of the moderns" who eventually developed the scientific method.

== Biography ==
Telesio was born of noble parentage in Cosenza, a city in Calabria, Southern Italy (Kingdom of Naples). He was educated in Milan by his uncle, Antonio, himself a scholar and a poet of eminence, and afterwards in Rome and Padua. His studies included a wide range of subjects, classics, science and philosophy, which constituted the curriculum of the Renaissance savants. Thus equipped, he began his attack upon the medieval Aristotelianism which then flourished in Padua and Bologna and he wrote some short poems, brought back to light by Luca Irwin Fragale in 2010. In 1553 he married and settled in Cosenza, becoming the founder of the Cosentian Academy. From 1544 to 1550 and after 1565 he lived in the household of Alfonso III Carafa, Duke of Nocera.

In 1552 Telesio married Diana Sersale, a widow with two children, with whom he had four children, the eldest of whom, Prospero, was mysteriously killed in 1576. After the death of his wife, Pope Pius IV offered him the Archbishopric of Cosenza, but Telesio refused in favour of his brother Tommaso. Bernardino spent the last years of his life in Cosenza where he took over the philosophical-scientific "Telesian" Academy that had been started by Aulo Giano Parrasio.

He died in Cosenza in 1588, famous among scholars and his students, but opposed by the Church for the heterodox views which he maintained against the established Aristotelianism. Pope Clement VIII placed his books on the Index of Prohibited Books in 1596.

== Works ==
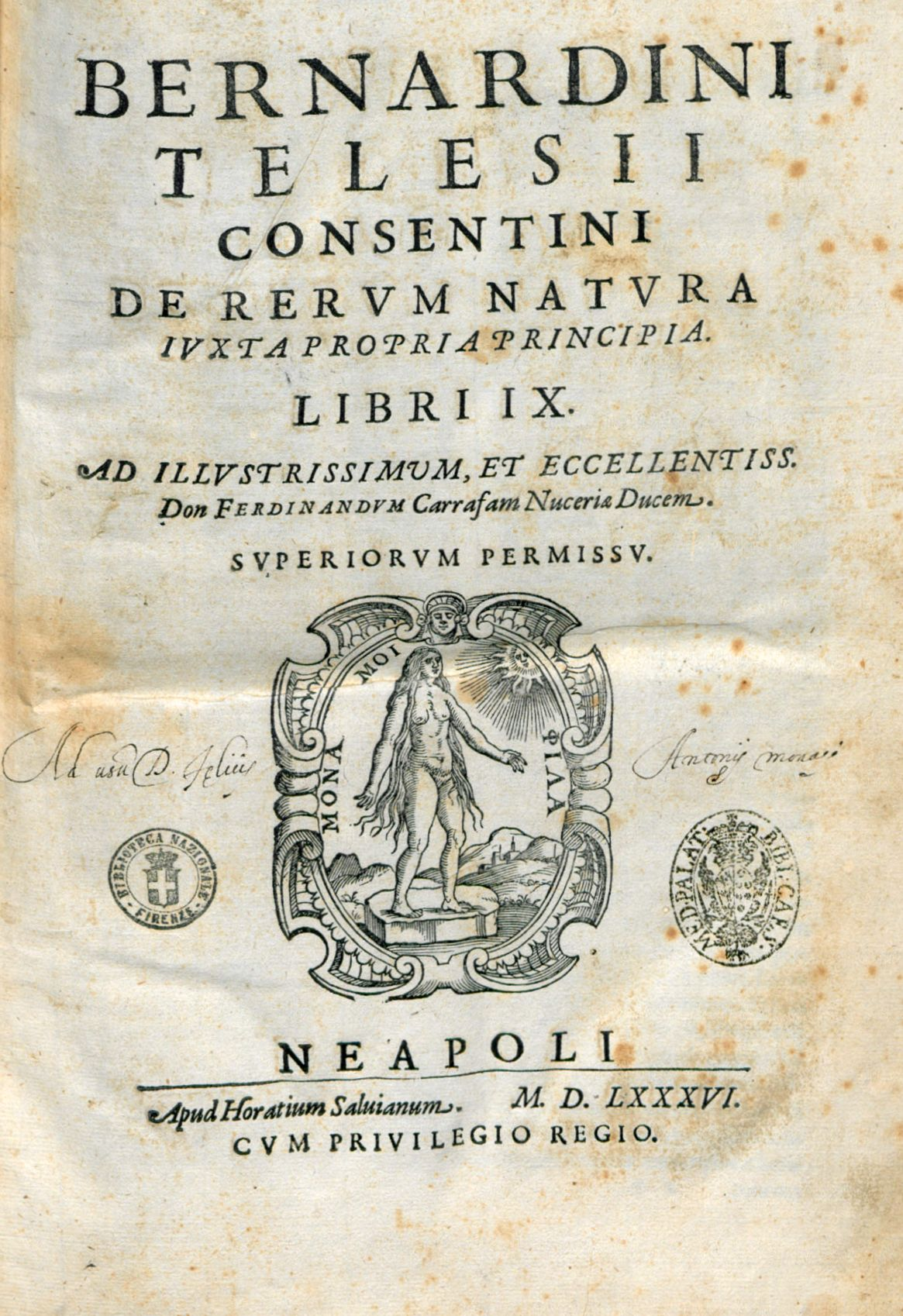
De rerum natura iuxta propria principia, 1586

His work De Rerum Natura Iuxta Propria Principia (On the Nature of Things according to their Own Principles) appeared in 1565 and the complete edition of nine books was published in 1586. These were followed by a large number of scientific and philosophical works of subsidiary importance, added to bolster his major work.

Besides De Rerum Natura, his other works include:

- De Somno
- De his quae in aere fiunt
- De Mari
- De Cometis et Circulo Lactea
- De usu respirationis.

== Theory of matter, heat and cold ==
Instead of postulating matter and form, he bases existence on matter and force. This force has two opposing elements: heat, which expands, and cold, which contracts. These two processes account for all the diverse forms and types of existence, while the mass on which the force operates remains the same. The harmony of the whole consists in this, that each separate thing develops in and for itself in accordance with its own nature while at the same time its motion benefits the rest. The obvious defects of this theory, (1) that the senses alone cannot apprehend matter itself, (2) that it is not clear how the multiplicity of phenomena could result from these two forces, though it is no less convincing than Aristotle's hot/cold, dry/wet explanation, and (3) that he adduced no evidence to substantiate the existence of these two forces, were pointed out at the time by his pupil, Patrizzi.

Moreover, his theory of the cold earth at rest and the hot sun in motion was doomed to disproof at the hands of Copernicus. At the same time, the theory was sufficiently coherent to make a great impression on Italian thought. It should be mentioned, though, that his obliteration of a distinction between superlunar and sublunar physics was certainly quite prescient though not acknowledged by his successors as particularly worthy of note. When Telesio went on to explain the relation of mind and matter, he was still more heterodox. Material forces are, by hypothesis, capable of feeling; matter also must have been from the first endowed with consciousness. For consciousness exists, and could not have been developed out of anything. This leads him to a form of hylozoism. Again, the soul is influenced by material conditions; consequently, the soul must have a material existence. He further held that all knowledge is a sensation ("non-ratione sed sensu") and that intelligence is, therefore, an agglomeration of isolated data, given by the senses. He does not, however, succeed in explaining how the senses alone can perceive difference and identity.

At the end of his scheme, he added a higher impulse, a soul superimposed by God, in virtue of which we strive beyond the world of sense. This divine soul is hardly a completely novel concept if viewed in the context of Averroestic or Thomasian perceptual theory.

The whole system of Telesio shows gaps in his argument, and ignorance of essential facts, but at the same time it is a forerunner of all subsequent empiricism, scientific and philosophical, and marks clearly the period of transition from authority and reason to experiment and individual responsibility.

== Reliance on sensory data ==
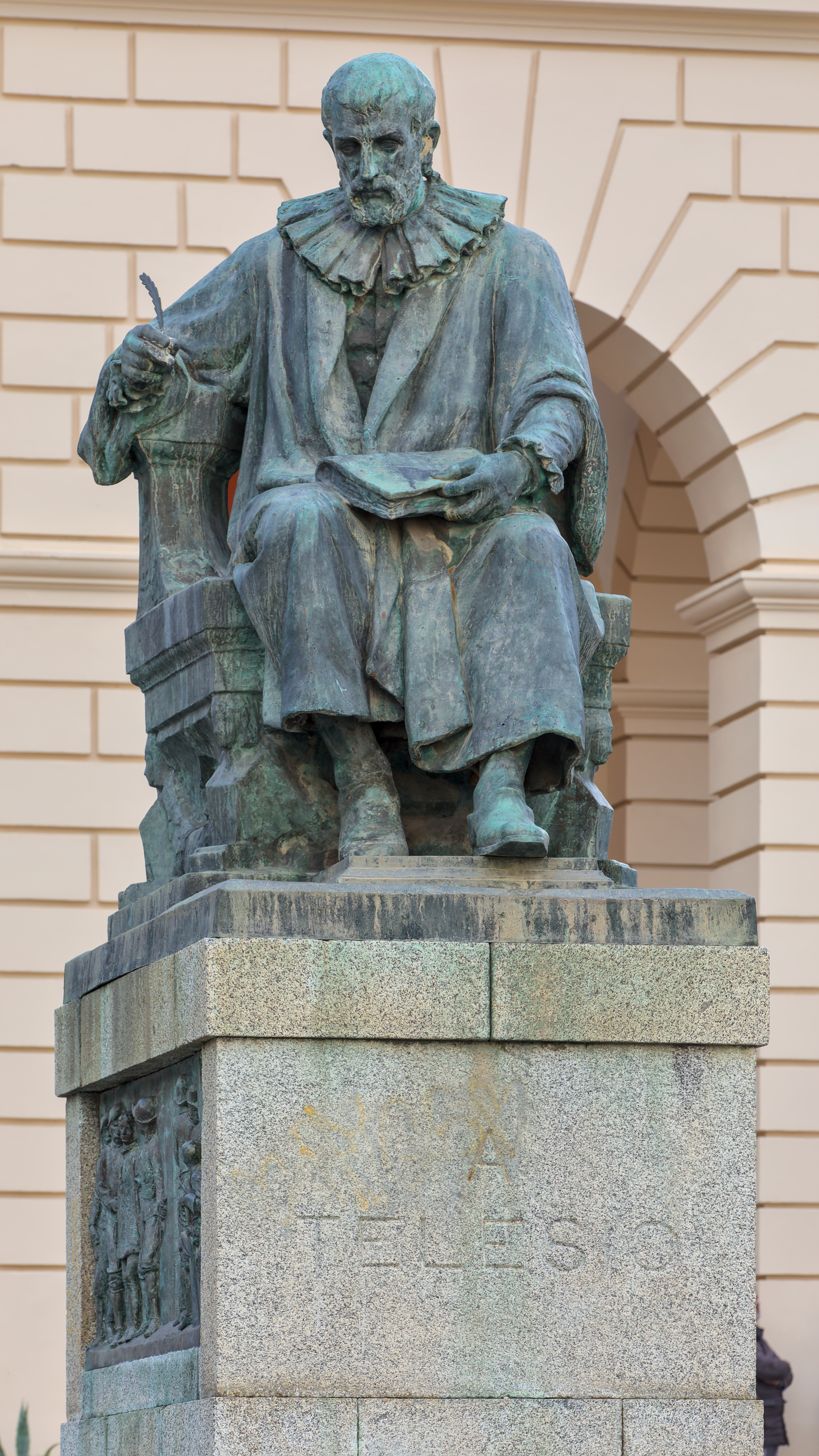
Statue of Bernardino Telesio in the Piazza XV Marzo, Cosenza

Telesio was the head of the great Southern Italian movement which protested against the accepted authority of abstract reason, and sowed the seeds from which sprang the scientific methods of Tommaso Campanella and Giordano Bruno, of Francis Bacon and René Descartes, with their widely divergent results. He, therefore, abandoned the purely intellectual sphere and proposed an inquiry into the data provided by the senses, from which he held that all true knowledge really comes (his theory of sense perception was essentially a reworking of Aristotle's theory from De Anima).

Telesio writes in the beginning of the Proem of the first book of the third edition of De Rerum Natura Iuxta Propria Principia Libri Ix... "That the construction of the world and the magnitude of the bodies contained within it, and the nature of the world, is to be searched for not by reason as was done by the ancients, but is to be understood by means of observation." (Mundi constructionem, corporumque in eo contentorum magnitudinem, naturamque non-ratione, quod antiquioribus factum est, inquirendam, sed sensu percipiendam.) This statement, found on the very first page, summarizes what many modern scholars have generally considered to be Telesian philosophy, and it often seems that many did not read any further for on the very next page he sets up his hot/cold theory of informed matter, a theory that is clearly not informed by our modern idea of observation. For Telesio, observation (sensu percipiendam) is a much larger mental process than simply recording data, observation also includes analogical thought.

Though Francis Bacon is generally credited nowadays with the codification of an inductive method that wholeheartedly endorses observation as the primary procedure for acquiring knowledge, he was certainly not the first to suggest that sensory perception should be the primary source for knowledge. Among natural philosophers from the Renaissance, this honour is generally bestowed upon Telesio. While Bacon criticises Telesio, he does acknowledge him as being "the first of the moderns" (De Telesio autem bene sentimus, atque eum ut amantem veritatis, & Scientiis utilem, & nonnullorum Placitorum emendatorem & novorum hominum primum agnoscimus., from Bacon's De principiis atque originibus) for putting observation above all other methods for acquiring knowledge about the natural world. This frequently quoted phrase from Bacon, though, is misleading, for it oversimplifies and misrepresents Bacon's opinion of Telesio. Most of Bacon's essay is an attack on Telesio and this phrase, invariably taken out of context, has facilitated a general misconception of Telesian natural philosophy by giving it a Baconian stamp of approval, which was far from Bacon's original intentions. Bacon sees in Telesio an ally in the fight against ancient authority, but he has little positive to say about Telesio's specific theories.

What is perhaps most striking about De rerum natura is Telesio's attempt to mechanize as much as possible. Telesio clearly strives to explain everything in terms of the matter informed by hot and cold and to keep his arguments as simple as possible. When his discussions turn to human beings he introduces an instinct of self-preservation to account for their motivations. And when he discusses the human mind and its ability to reason in the abstract about immaterial and divine topics, he adds a soul. For without a soul, all thought, by his reasoning, would be limited to material things. This would make God unthinkable and clearly, this was not the case, for observation proves that people think about God.
