= John Rigby Hale =

British historian

Sir John Rigby Hale FBA (17 September 1923 – 12 August 1999) was a British historian and translator, best known for his Renaissance studies.

== Biography ==
Hale was born in Ashford, Kent. He was educated at Jesus College, Oxford (B.A., 1948, M.A., 1953). He also attended Johns Hopkins University and Harvard University (1948–49).

He was a Fellow of the British Academy and Emeritus Professor of Italian History at University College, London, where he was head of the Italian Department from 1970 until his retirement in 1988. His first position was as Fellow and Tutor in Modern History at Jesus College, Oxford, from 1949 to 1964. After this, he became the first Professor of History at Warwick University where he remained until 1970. He taught at a number of other universities, including Cornell and the University of California.

He was a trustee of the National Gallery, London, from 1973 to 1980, becoming chairman in 1974. He was made a Knight Bachelor on 20 August 1984.

In 1992, he suffered a severe stroke that caused aphasia. He died seven years later in Twickenham, after which his wife, journalist and Titian biographer Sheila Hale, wrote a book about his final years titled The Man Who Lost His Language.

== Collections ==
Hale's widow Sheila donated his archive to University College London in 2000. The collection contains research materials for The Civilization of Europe in the Renaissance, papers relating to other areas of Hale's work, biographical material, and press cuttings.

== Works ==
=== Author ===
- Napoleon: The Story of His Life, London, Faber and Faber, 1954.
- England and the Italian Renaissance: The Growth of Interest in its History and Art, London, Faber and Faber, 1954. 4th edition, new introduction and bibliographical update by Edward Chaney, Oxford, Blackwell, 2005.
- Machiavelli and Renaissance Italy, London, English Universities Press, 1961.
- The Art of War and Renaissance England, Washington, Folger Shakespeare Library, 1961.
- Renaissance, New York, Time Life Education, 1965.
- Renaissance Exploration, New York, W. W. Norton, 1968.
- Renaissance Europe, 1480–1520, London: Collins, 1971.
- Italian Renaissance Painting from Masaccio to Titian, New York: Dutton, 1977.
- Florence and the Medici: The Pattern of Control, London, Thames & Hudson, 1977.
- Renaissance Fortification: Art or Engineering?, London, Thames & Hudson, 1977.
- War and Society in Renaissance Europe, Leicester, Fontana Paperbacks, 1985.
- Artists and Warfare in the Renaissance, Yale University Press, 1990.
- The Civilization of Europe in the Renaissance, London, HarperCollins, 1993.

=== Translator ===
- Mandragola: a comedy, by Niccolò Machiavelli, Fantasy Press, 1957.
- Literary Works: Mandragola, Clizia, A dialogue on language, and Belfagor: with selections from the private correspondence, by Niccolò Machiavelli. Edited and translated by J. R. Hale, London, New York, Oxford University Press, 1961.
- Antonio de Beatis, The Travel Journal of Antonio de Beatis: Germany, Switzerland, the Low Countries, France and Italy, 1517–1518, translated from the Italian by J. R. Hale and J. M. A. Lindon. Edited by J. R. Hale. London, Hakluyt Society, c. 1979.

=== Editor ===
- "The Italian Journal of Samuel Rogers" edited by J. R Hale, with an account of Rogers' life and travel in Italy in 1814–21. Faber and Faber 1956.
- History of Italy and History of Florence. Translated by Cecil Grayson. Edited and abridged with an introduction by John Rigby Hale. New York, Washington Square Press, 1964.
- Certain Discourses Military, Ithaca, New York, Published for the Folger Shakespeare Library by Cornell University Press, 1964.
- Europe in the Late Middle Ages. Edited by John Rigby Hale, J. R. L. Highfield and B. Smalley. Northwestern University Press, 1965.
- The Evolution of British Historiography: from Bacon to Namier. London, Melbourne, Macmillan, 1967.
- Renaissance Venice, London, Faber and Faber. 1973.
- A Concise Encyclopaedia of the Italian Renaissance, New York, Oxford University Press, 1981.
- The Thames and Hudson Encyclopedia of the Italian Renaissance, New York, Thames and Hudson, 1981.
- Renaissance War Studies, London, Hambledon Press, 1983.
