= List of municipalities of the Province of Vibo Valentia =

The following is a list of the 50 municipalities (comuni) of the Province of Vibo Valentia in the region of Calabria in Italy.

== List ==
Municipality	Population (2026)	Area (km²)	Density
Acquaro	1,780	25.25	70.5
Arena	1,144	34.32	33.3
Briatico	3,578	27.92	128.2
Brognaturo	719	25.69	28.0
Capistrano	931	21.12	44.1
Cessaniti	2,844	17.97	158.3
Dasà	1,067	6.46	165.2
Dinami	1,642	44.45	36.9
Drapia	2,095	21.59	97.0
Fabrizia	1,928	40.00	48.2
Filadelfia	4,942	31.50	156.9
Filandari	1,737	18.84	92.2
Filogaso	1,306	23.90	54.6
Francavilla Angitola	1,798	28.63	62.8
Francica	1,608	22.70	70.8
Gerocarne	1,856	45.23	41.0
Ionadi	4,768	8.81	541.2
Joppolo	1,711	21.67	79.0
Limbadi	3,184	29.15	109.2
Maierato	2,152	39.93	53.9
Mileto	6,228	35.65	174.7
Mongiana	573	18.41	31.1
Monterosso Calabro	1,440	18.37	78.4
Nardodipace	1,018	33.30	30.6
Nicotera	7,079	28.25	250.6
Parghelia	1,271	7.95	159.9
Pizzo	8,668	22.89	378.7
Pizzoni	916	21.70	42.2
Polia	770	31.51	24.4
Ricadi	5,048	22.54	224.0
Rombiolo	4,201	22.84	183.9
San Calogero	3,712	25.34	146.5
San Costantino Calabro	2,031	6.79	299.1
San Gregorio d'Ippona	2,574	12.53	205.4
San Nicola da Crissa	1,174	19.40	60.5
Sant'Onofrio	2,655	18.66	142.3
Serra San Bruno	6,252	40.57	154.1
Simbario	910	20.83	43.7
Sorianello	1,068	9.59	111.4
Soriano Calabro	2,783	15.44	180.2
Spadola	795	9.65	82.4
Spilinga	1,345	17.42	77.2
Stefanaconi	2,248	23.18	97.0
Tropea	5,668	3.66	1,548.6
Vallelonga	828	17.64	46.9
Vazzano	919	20.20	45.5
Vibo Valentia	30,753	46.57	660.4
Zaccanopoli	646	5.38	120.1
Zambrone	1,766	15.77	112.0
Zungri	1,793	23.46	76.4

== See also ==
- List of municipalities of Calabria
- List of municipalities of Italy
