= List of beaches in Italy =

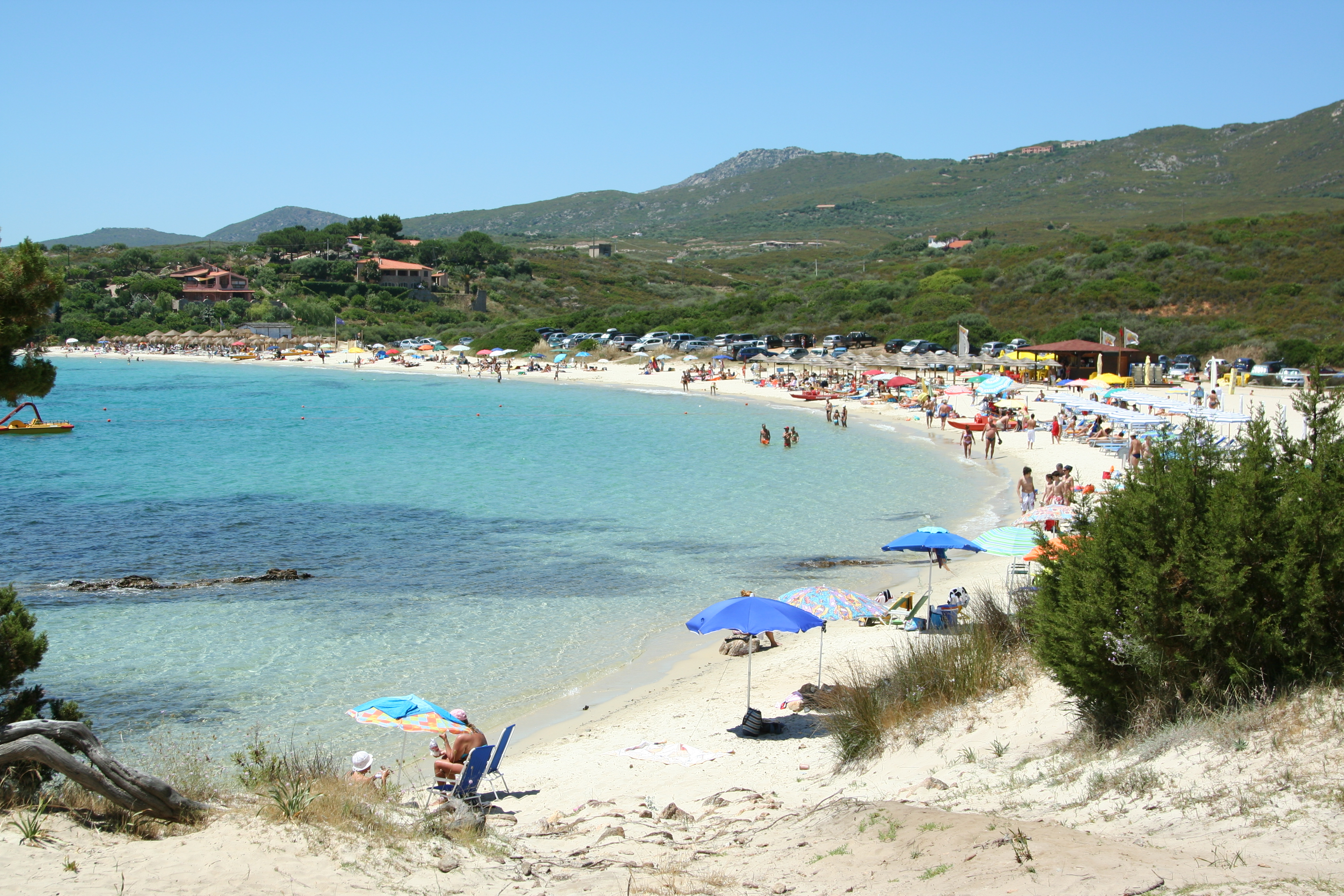
Costa Smeralda

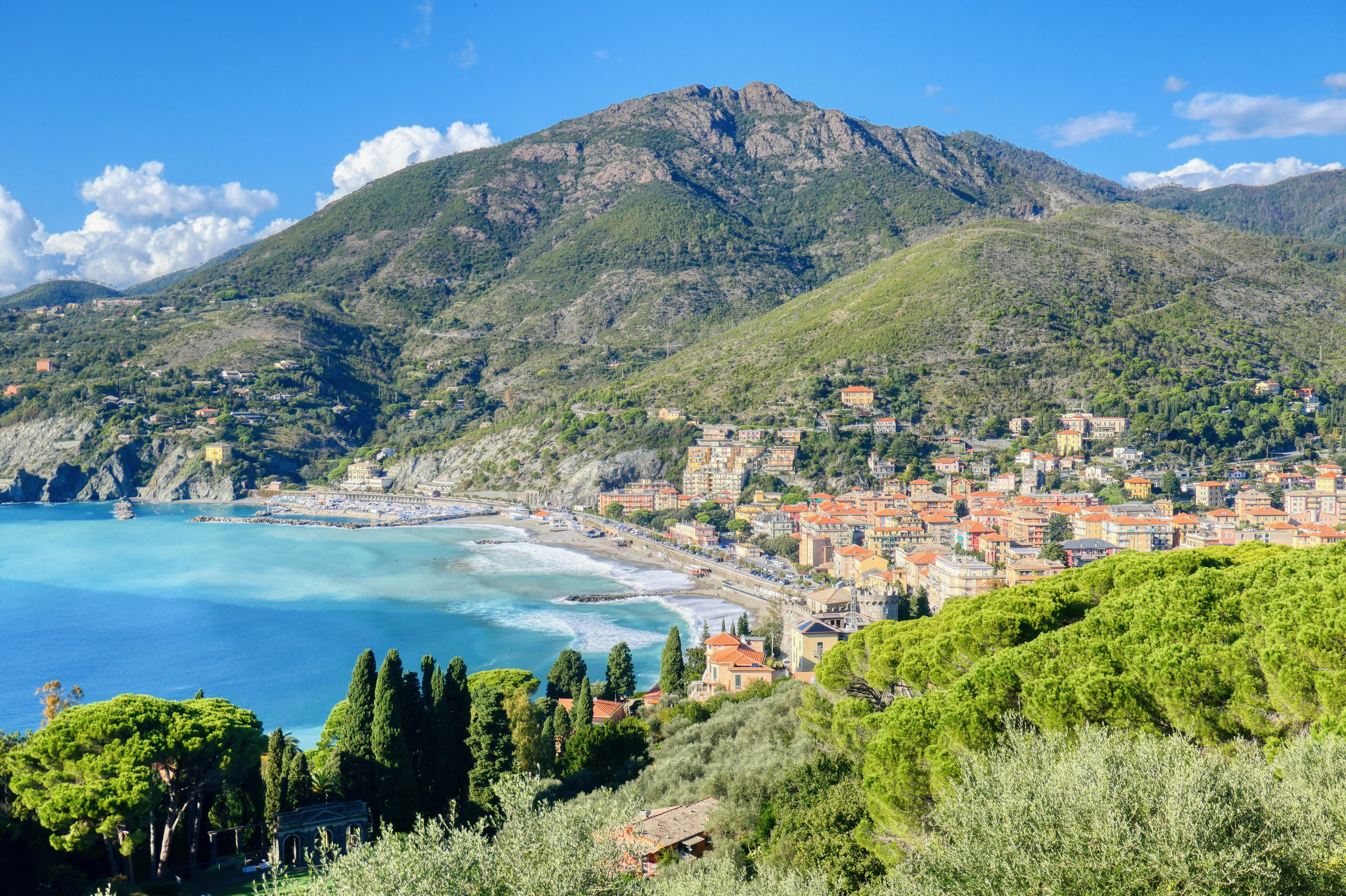
Cinque Terre

This is a list of beaches in Italy.

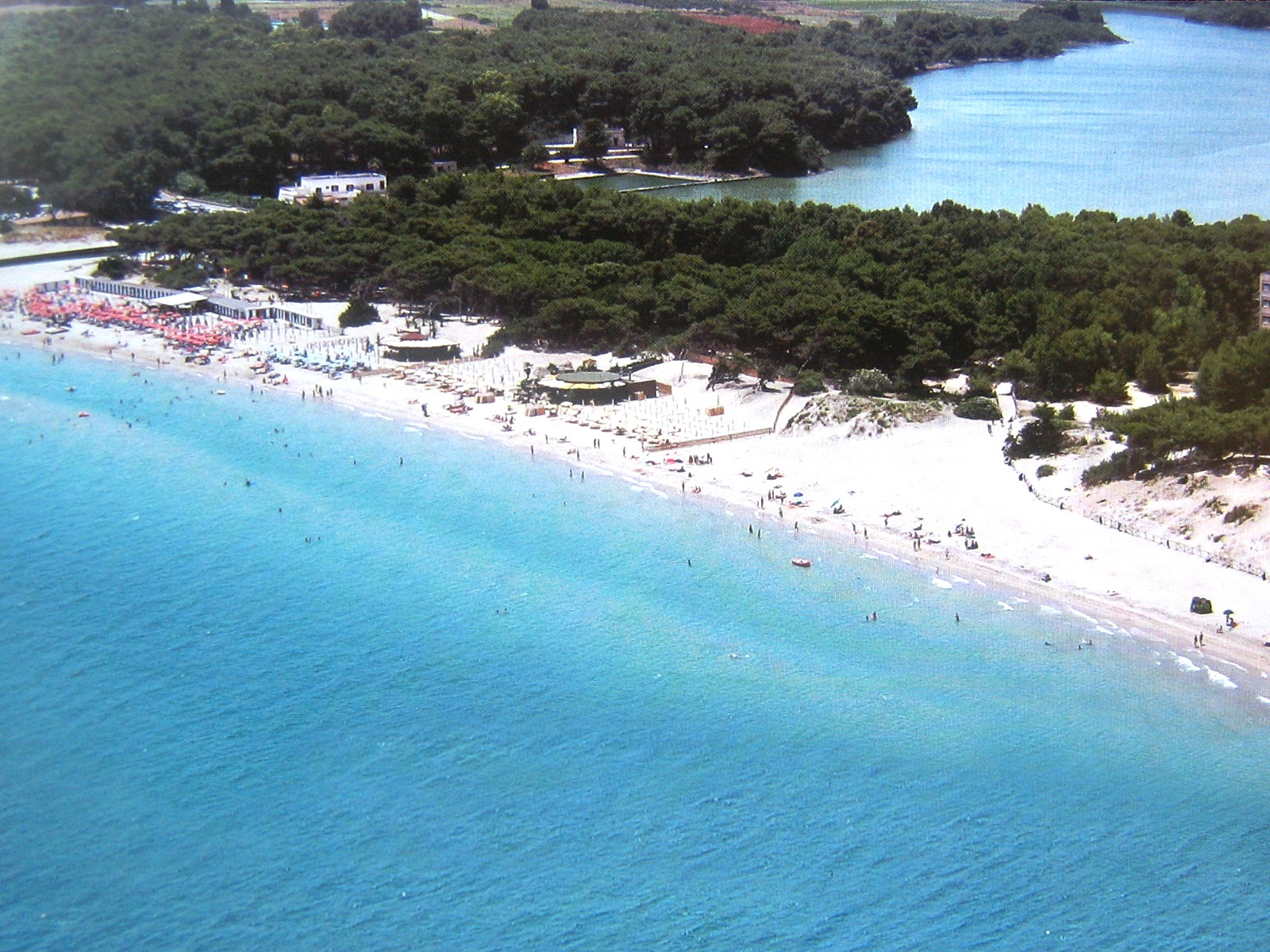
Otranto

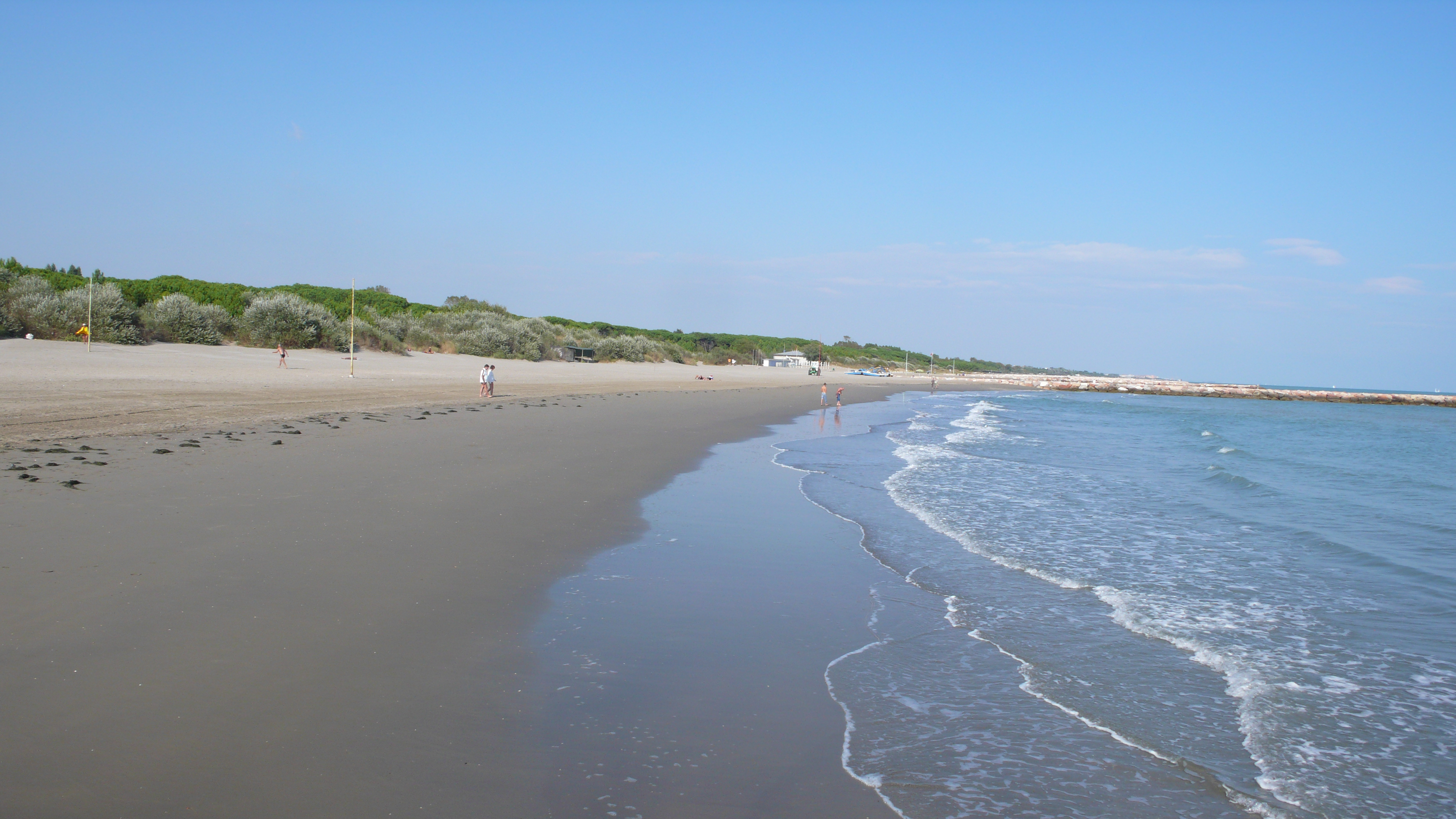
The beach at Eraclea Mare

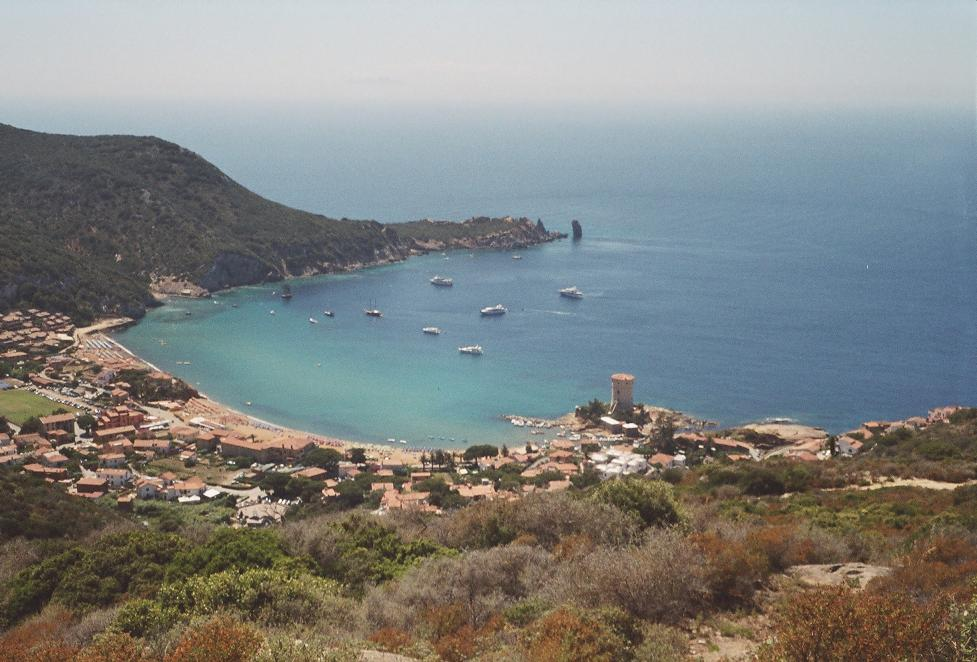
Campese, Isola del Giglio

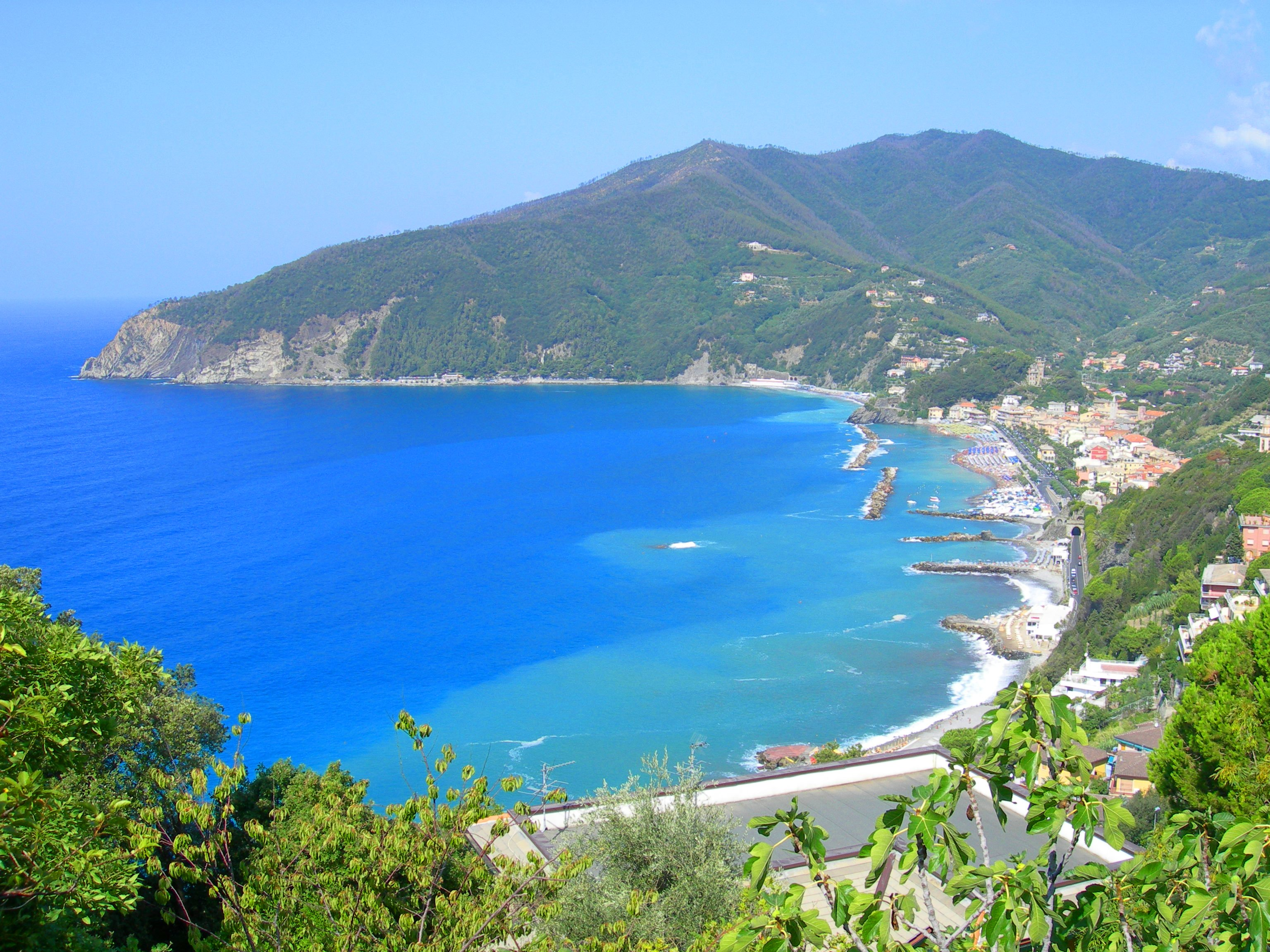
A view of Moneglia

- Francavilla al Mare, Abruzzo
- Giulianova, Abruzzo
- Montesilvano, Abruzzo
- Ortona, Abruzzo
- Pescara, Abruzzo
- Tortoreto Lido, Abruzzo
- Alba Adriatica, Abruzzo
- Villa Rosa, Abruzzo
- Martinsicuro, Abruzzo
- Roseto degli Abruzzi, Abruzzo
- San Salvo, Abruzzo
- Vasto, Abruzzo
- Alessano, Apulia
- Alliste, Apulia
- Andrano, Apulia
- Castrignano del Capo, Apulia
- Castro, Apulia
- Corsano, Apulia
- Diso, Apulia
- Gagliano del Capo, Apulia
- Galatone, Apulia
- Gallipoli, Apulia
- Lecce, Apulia
- Manfredonia, Apulia
- Melendugno, Apulia
- Molfetta, Apulia
- Monopoli, Apulia
- Morciano di Leuca, Apulia
- Nardò, Apulia
- Peschici, Apulia
- Polignano a Mare, Apulia
- Porto Cesareo, Apulia
- Rodi Garganico, Apulia
- Ugento, Apulia
- Vieste, Apulia
- Maratea, Basilicata
- Pisticci, Basilicata
- Policoro, Basilicata
- Amantea, Calabria
- Acquappesa, Calabria
- Ardore, Calabria
- Badolato, Calabria
- Bagnara, Calabria
- Belcastro, Calabria
- Belmonte Calabro, Calabria
- Belvedere Marittimo, Calabria
- Bianco, Calabria
- Borgia, Calabria
- Botricello, Calabria
- Bovalino, Calabria
- Bova Marina, Calabria
- Brancaleone, Calabria
- Briatico, Calabria
- Calopezzati, Calabria
- Campora San Giovanni, Calabria
- Capo Colonna, Calabria
- Capo Vaticano, Calabria
- Catanzaro, Calabria
- Caulonia, Calabria
- Cetraro, Calabria
- Cirò Marina, Calabria
- Coreca, Calabria
- Cropani, Calabria
- Crotone, Calabria
- Crucoli, Calabria
- Davoli, Calabria
- Diamante, Calabria
- Drapia, Calabria
- Falerna, Calabria
- Francavilla Marittima, Calabria
- Fuscaldo, Calabria
- Gioia Tauro, Calabria
- Grisolia, Calabria
- Grotteria, Calabria
- Guardavalle, Calabria
- Guardia Piemontese, Calabria
- Isca sullo Ionio, Calabria
- Isola di Capo Rizzuto, Calabria
- Joppolo, Calabria
- Locri, Calabria
- Longobardi, Calabria
- Mandatoriccio, Calabria
- Melissa, Calabria
- Melito di Porto Salvo, Calabria
- Monasterace, Calabria
- Montepaone, Calabria
- Nocera Terinese, Calabria
- Nicotera, Calabria
- Palizzi, Calabria
- Palmi, Calabria
- Paola, Calabria
- Parghelia, Calabria
- Pizzo, Calabria
- Praia a Mare, Calabria
- Reggio Calabria, Calabria
- Riace, Calabria
- Ricadi, Calabria
- Rocca Imperiale, Calabria
- Roccella Ionica, Calabria
- Roseto Capo Spulico, Calabria
- Sangineto, Calabria
- Santa Caterina dello Ionio, Calabria
- Santa Maria del Cedro, Calabria
- San Lucido, Calabria
- San Nicola Arcella, Calabria
- San Sostene, Calabria
- Scalea, Calabria
- Scilla, Calabria
- Siderno, Calabria
- Soverato, Calabria
- Squillace, Calabria
- Tortora, Calabria
- Trebisacce, Calabria
- Tropea, Calabria
- Vibo Valentia, Calabria
- Villapiana, Calabria
- Villa San Giovanni, Calabria
- Zambrone, Calabria
- Acciaroli, Campania
- Agropoli, Campania
- Amalfi, Campania
- Anacapri, Campania
- Ascea, Campania
- Atrani, Campania
- Bacoli, Campania
- Camerota, Campania
- Capaccio, Campania
- Capri, Campania
- Castellabate, Campania
- Castellammare di Stabia, Campania
- Castel Volturno, Campania
- Citara, Campania
- Cellole, Campania
- Centola, Campania
- Cetara, Campania
- Eboli, Campania
- Ercolano, Campania
- Forio, Campania
- Furore, Campania
- Giugliano in Campania, Campania
- Ischia, Campania
- Maiori, Campania
- Minori, Campania
- Mondragone, Campania
- Monte di Procida, Campania
- Naples, Campania
- Palinuro, Campania
- Pollica, Campania
- Pompeii, Campania
- Portici, Campania
- Positano, Campania
- Pozzuoli, Campania
- Praiano, Campania
- Procida, Campania
- Ravello, Campania
- Salerno, Campania
- San Giovanni a Piro, Campania
- Sapri, Campania
- Sessa Aurunca, Campania
- Sorrento, Campania
- Torre Annunziata, Campania
- Torre del Greco, Campania
- Vico Equense, Campania
- Vietri sul Mare, Campania
- Bellaria-Igea Marina, Emilia-Romagna
- Cattolica, Emilia-Romagna
- Cervia, Emilia-Romagna
- Cesenatico, Emilia-Romagna
- Gatteo, Emilia-Romagna
- Misano Adriatico, Emilia-Romagna
- Ravenna, Emilia-Romagna
- Riccione, Emilia-Romagna
- Rimini, Emilia-Romagna
- San Mauro Pascoli, Emilia-Romagna
- Savignano sul Rubicone, Emilia-Romagna
- Grado, Italy, Friuli-Venezia Giulia
- Lignano, Friuli-Venezia Giulia
- Alassio, Liguria
- Albenga, Liguria
- Albisola Superiore, Liguria
- Albissola Marina, Liguria
- Ameglia, Liguria
- Arenzano, Liguria
- Bergeggi, Liguria
- Bogliasco, Liguria
- Bonassola, Liguria
- Bordighera, Liguria
- Borghetto Santo Spirito, Liguria
- Borgio Verezzi, Liguria
- Camogli, Liguria
- Camporosso, Liguria
- Celle Ligure, Liguria
- Ceriale, Liguria
- Cervo, Liguria
- Chiavari, Liguria
- Cipressa, Liguria
- Cogoleto, Liguria
- Costarainera, Liguria
- Deiva Marina, Liguria
- Diano Marina, Liguria
- Finale Ligure, Liguria
- Framura, Liguria
- Genoa, Liguria
- Imperia, Liguria
- Laigueglia, Liguria
- La Spezia, Liguria
- Lavagna, Liguria
- Lerici, Liguria
- Levanto, Liguria
- Loano, Liguria
- Moneglia, Liguria
- Monterosso al Mare, Liguria
- Noli, Liguria
- Ospedaletti, Liguria
- Pietra Ligure, Liguria
- Pieve Ligure, Liguria
- Portofino, Liguria
- Porto Venere, Liguria
- Rapallo, Liguria
- Recco, Liguria
- Riomaggiore, Liguria
- Riva Ligure, Liguria
- San Bartolomeo al Mare, Liguria
- Sanremo, Liguria
- Santa Margherita Ligure, Liguria
- Santo Stefano al Mare, Liguria
- Sarzana, Liguria
- Savona, Liguria
- Sestri Levante, Liguria
- Sori, Liguria
- Spotorno, Liguria
- Taggia, Liguria
- Vado Ligure, Liguria
- Vallecrosia, Liguria
- Varazze, Liguria
- Ventimiglia, Liguria
- Vernazza, Liguria
- Zoagli, Liguria
- Falconara Marittima, Marche
- Fano, Marche
- Gabicce Mare, Marche
- Porto Recanati, Marche
- Porto Sant'Elpidio, Marche
- San Benedetto del Tronto, Marche
- Senigallia, Marche
- Campomarino, Molise
- Montenero di Bisaccia, Molise
- Petacciato, Molise
- Termoli, Molise
- Alghero, Sardinia
- Costa Smeralda, Sardinia
- Olbia, Sardinia
- Poetto, Sardinia
- Porto Cervo, Sardinia
- Porto Rotondo, Sardinia
- Porto Torres, Sardinia
- Sant'Antioco, Sardinia
- Maladroxia, Sardinia
- Coaquaddus, Sardinia
- Is Pruinis, Sardinia
- Cala Sapone, Sardinia
- Sassari, Sardinia
- Agrigento, Sicily
- Avola, Sicily
- Barcellona Pozzo di Gotto, Sicily
- Capo d'Orlando, Sicily
- Cefalù, Sicily
- Gela, Sicily
- Giardini Naxos, Sicily
- Marina di Ragusa, Sicily
- Marsala, Sicily
- Mazara del Vallo, Sicily
- Milazzo, Sicily
- Noto, Sicily
- Pachino, Sicily
- San Vito Lo Capo, Sicily
- Siracusa, Sicily
- Termini Imerese, Sicily
- Trapani, Sicily
- Capraia, Tuscany
- Campo nell'Elba, Elba, Tuscany
- Capoliveri, Elba, Tuscany
- Marciana, Elba, Tuscany
- Marciana Marina, Elba, Tuscany
- Porto Azzurro, Elba, Tuscany
- Portoferraio, Elba, Tuscany
- Rio Marina, Elba, Tuscany
- Rio nell'Elba, Elba, Tuscany
- Giglio Island, Tuscany
- Bibbona, Tuscany
- Camaiore, Tuscany
- Capalbio, Tuscany
- Carrara, Tuscany
- Castagneto Carducci, Tuscany
- Castiglione della Pescaia, Tuscany
- Cecina, Tuscany
- Follonica, Tuscany
- Forte dei Marmi, Tuscany
- Grosseto, Tuscany
- Leghorn, Tuscany
- Magliano in Toscana, Tuscany
- Massa, Tuscany
- Monte Argentario, Tuscany
- Montignoso, Tuscany
- Orbetello, Tuscany
- Pietrasanta, Tuscany
- Piombino, Tuscany
- Pisa, Tuscany
- Rosignano Marittimo, Tuscany
- San Giuliano Terme, Tuscany
- San Vincenzo, Tuscany
- Scarlino, Tuscany
- Vecchiano, Tuscany
- Viareggio, Tuscany
- Albarella, Veneto
- Barricata, Veneto
- Bibione, Veneto
- Caorle, Veneto
- Cavallino (Jesolo), Veneto
- Eraclea, Veneto
- Jesolo, Veneto
- Rosolina, Veneto
- Sottomarina, Isolaverde, Veneto
- Venice Lido, Veneto

== See also ==
- List of beaches
