= Spilinga =

Town in Calabria, Italy

- Comune
- Comune di Spilinga
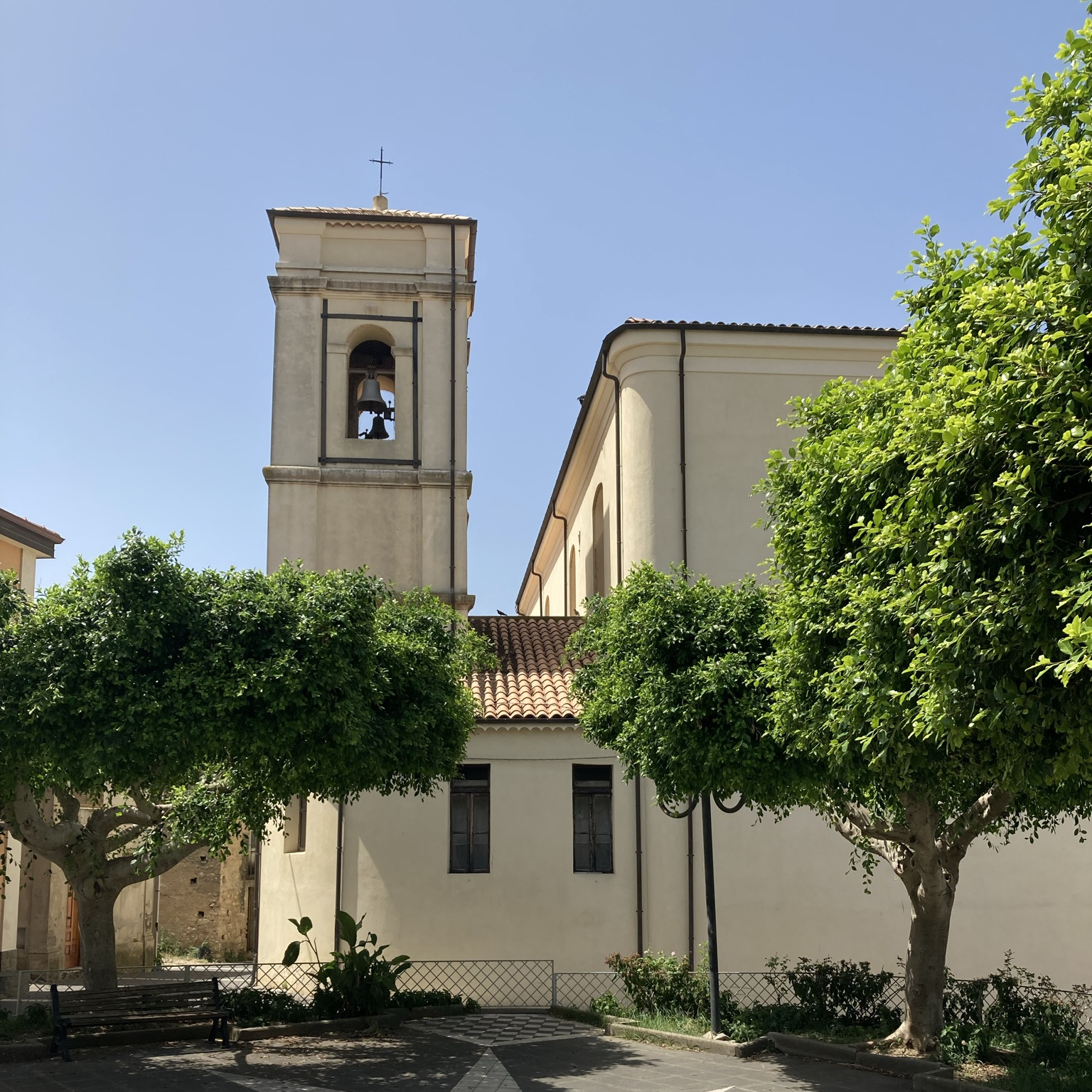

- Location within Italy Location within Calabria
- Coordinates: 38°38′N 15°54′E
- Country: Italy
- Region: Calabria
- Province: Province of Vibo Valentia (VV)
- Frazioni: Panaìa, Monte Poro

Area
  - Total: 18.7 km^{2} (7.2 sq mi)
- Elevation: 650 m (2,130 ft)

Population (Dec. 2004)
  - Total: 1,665
  - Density: 89.0/km^{2} (231/sq mi)
- Demonym: Spilingesi or Spilingoti
- Time zone: UTC+1 (CET)
  - Summer (DST): UTC+2 (CEST)
- Postal code: 89864
- Dialing code: 0963
- Patron saint: San Giovanni Battista (John the Baptist)

Spilinga is a comune (municipality) in the Province of Vibo Valentia in the Italian region Calabria, located about 70 kilometres (43 mi) southwest of Catanzaro and about 15 kilometres (9 mi) west of Vibo Valentia. As of 31 December 2004, it had a population of 1,665 and an area of 18.7 square kilometres (7.2 mi^{2}).

The municipality of Spilinga contains the frazioni (subdivisions, mainly villages and hamlets) Panaìa and Monte Poro.

Spilinga borders the following municipalities: Drapia, Joppolo, Limbadi, Nicotera, Ricadi, Rombiolo, Zungri.

== Points of interest ==
=== Madonna delle Fonti ===
The Sanctuary of Madonna della Fontana is set in an ancient hermit cave near the town. The cult of Madonna of the Fountain begins in the early 1900s. The little church was built in 1920 in the same place where, as local people say, a woman found a statue of a Virgin Lady by following instructions she received in a dream.

=== Other points of interest ===
- Church of San Giovanni Battista: built in 1645
- Church of Carciadi: set in the higher point of the town
- Rural aqueduct: about four miles from the town, on the road to Vibo Valentia. Its structure recalls an ancient Roman aqueduct
- Hermits caves: in medieval times, hermits chose these natural caves in the neighborhood of Spilinga as a place to take shelter and pray.
- Ruffa Valley: crossed by the torrent Ruffa. Very interesting for its variety of fauna and flora (among other things, a rare species of fern, Woodwardia radicans). Along the valley there are many old mills, that were an important economic resource till the 1950s.
- Spilinga is the home of 'nduja, a spicy pork paté.

== Demographic evolution ==
Historical population

Year	Pop.	±%
1861	2,209	—
1871	2,187	−1.0%
1881	2,532	+15.8%
1901	3,080	+21.6%
1911	3,279	+6.5%

Year	Pop.	±%
1921	3,280	+0.0%
1931	2,909	−11.3%
1936	2,733	−6.1%
1951	2,552	−6.6%
1961	2,042	−20.0%

Year	Pop.	±%
1971	1,664	−18.5%
1981	1,570	−5.6%
1991	1,615	+2.9%
2001	1,609	−0.4%

Source: Data from ISTAT
