= Nardodipace =

- Comune
- Comune di Nardodipace
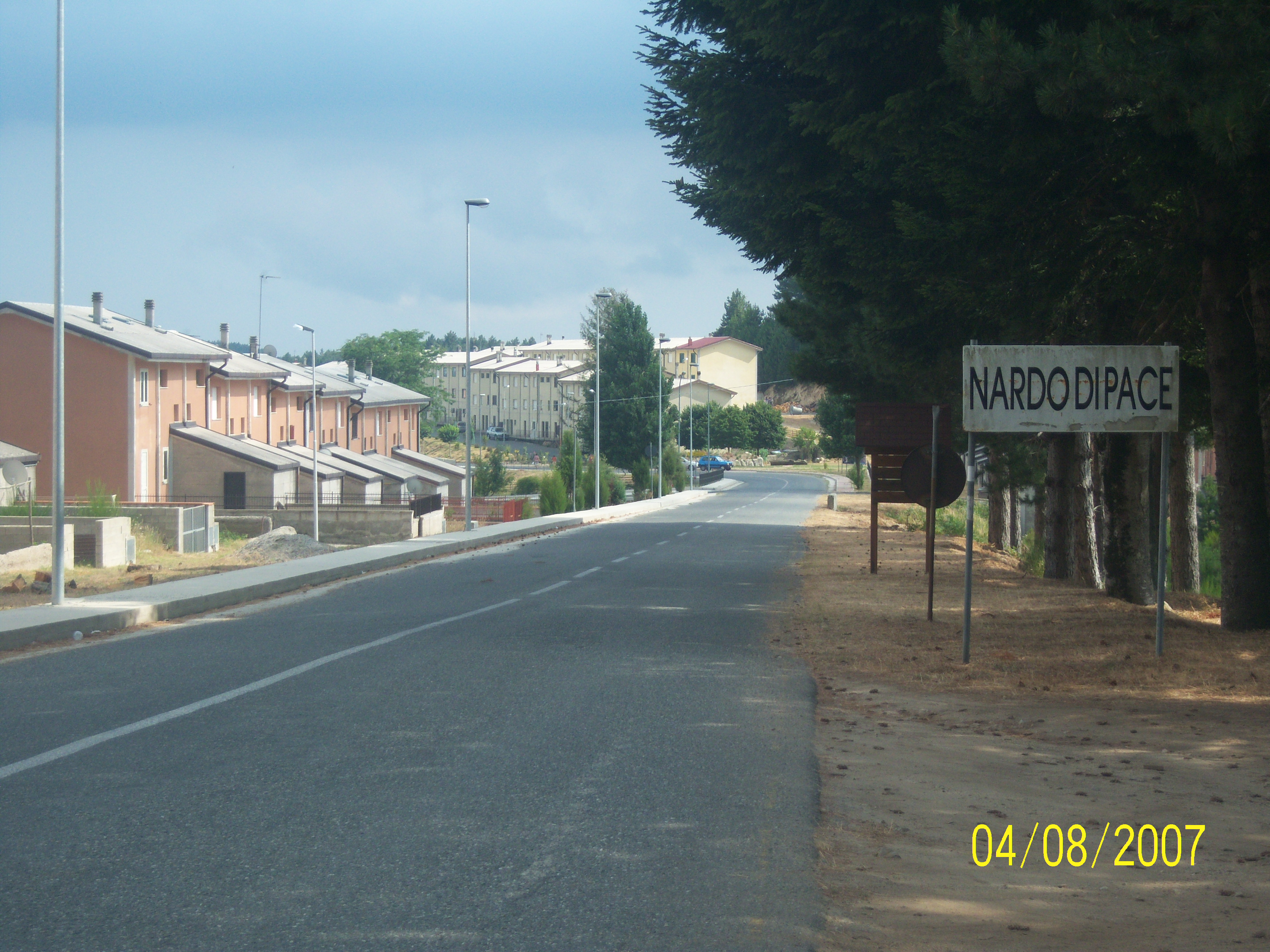

- Location within Italy Location within Calabria
- Coordinates: 38°28′N 16°20′E
- Country: Italy
- Region: Calabria
- Province: Vibo Valentia (VV)
- Frazioni: Cassari, Ragonà, Santo Todaro

Area
  - Total: 32.7 km^{2} (12.6 sq mi)

Population (2007)
  - Total: 1,419
  - Density: 43.4/km^{2} (112/sq mi)
- Time zone: UTC+1 (CET)
  - Summer (DST): UTC+2 (CEST)
- Postal code: 88020
- Dialing code: 0963

Nardodipace (Calabrian: Narduepaci) is a comune (municipality) in the Province of Vibo Valentia in the Italian region Calabria, located about 50 kilometres (31 mi) southwest of Catanzaro and about 30 kilometres (19 mi) southeast of Vibo Valentia.

Nardodipace borders the following municipalities: Caulonia, Fabrizia (to which it was united until 1901), Martone, Mongiana, Pazzano, Roccella Ionica, Stilo.
