= Aquapark di Zambrone =

Water park in Zambrone, Italy

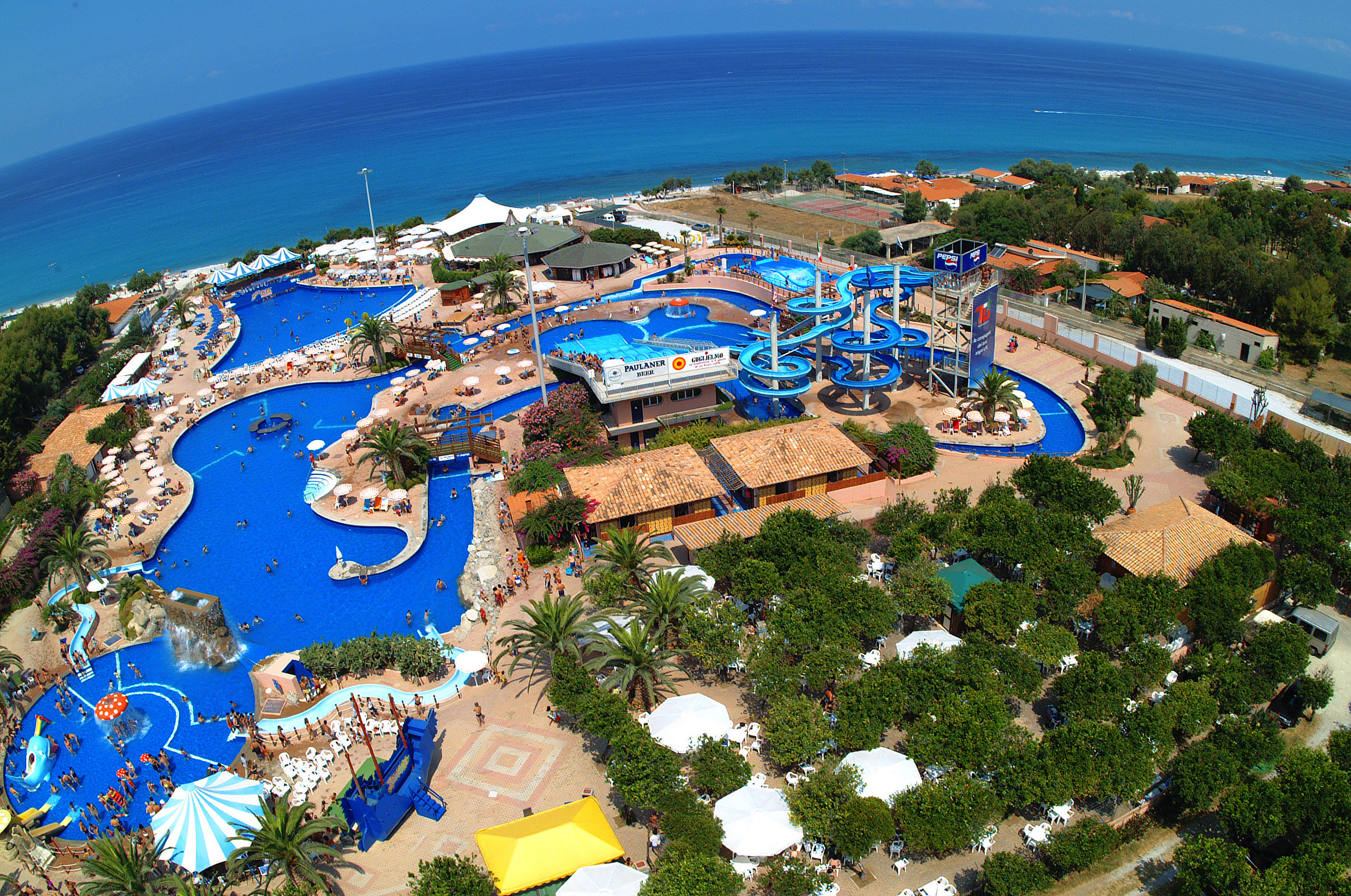
- Aquapark di Zambrone in July 2002
- Interactive map of Aquapark di Zambrone
- Location: Zambrone, Italy
- Coordinates: 38°42′39″N 15°58′16″E
- Opened: 11 January 1989
- Closed: 2007

Aquapark Zambrone was the first water park in Southern Italy, located on the coast of the comune of Zambrone in the Province of Vibo Valentia. The World Waterpark Association calls it "one of the largest and most famous waterparks of Southern Italy". Construction began on January 11, 1989, and seven months later, on August 13 of the same year, its gates were opened for the first time to the public. The 60,000 square metres (650,000 sq ft) park closed in 2007 to make way to a luxury resort hotel.
