= Filandari =

Filandari Φιλαντάρις (Greek)
- Comune
- Comune di Filandari
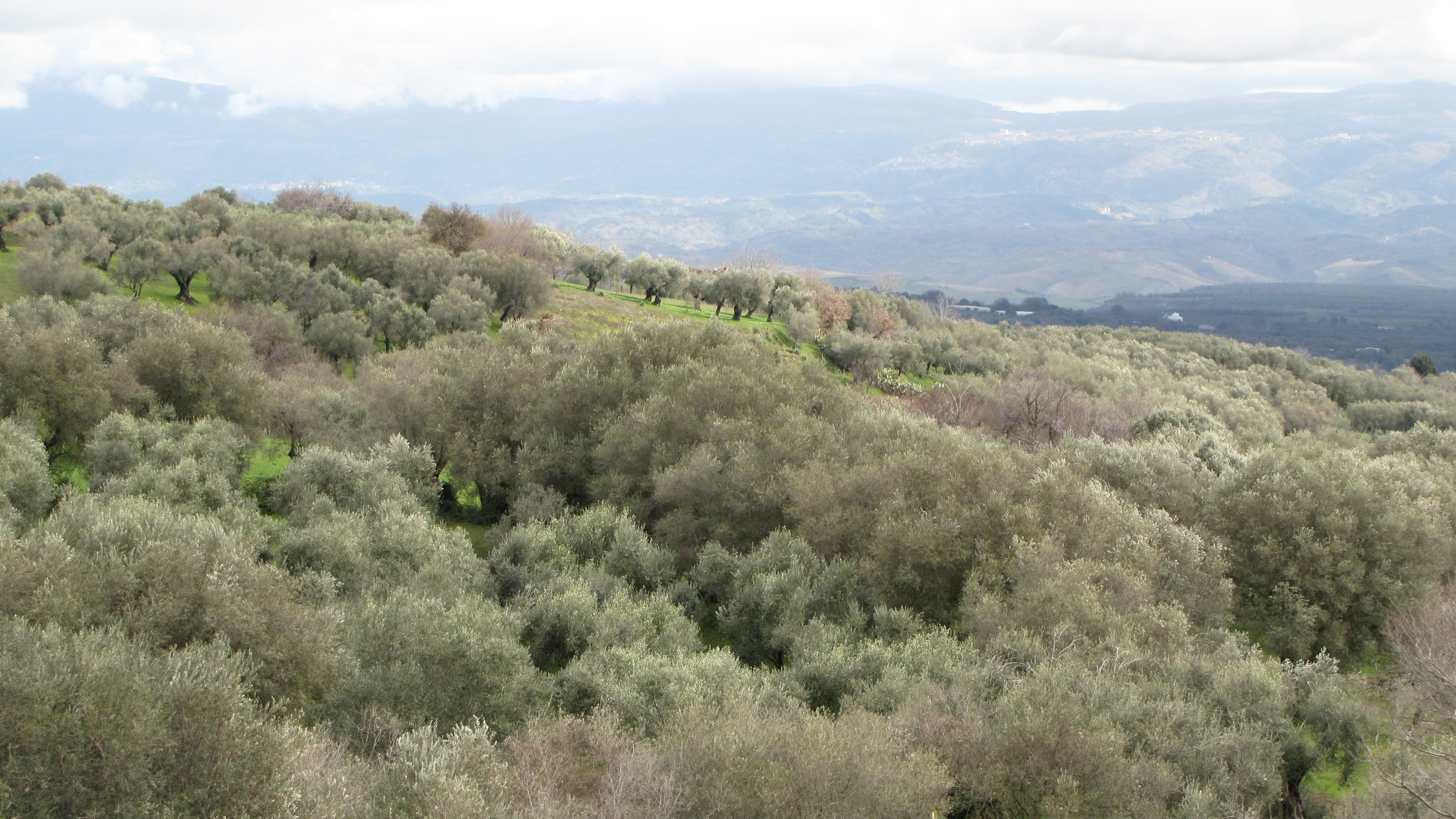
- olive grove in the municipality of Filandari in the province of Vibo Valentia

- Location within Italy Location within Calabria
- Coordinates: 38°37′N 16°2′E
- Country: Italy
- Region: Calabria
- Province: Province of Vibo Valentia (VV)

Government
  - Mayor: Vincenzo Pizzuto

Area
  - Total: 18.5 km^{2} (7.1 sq mi)

Population (Dec. 2004)
  - Total: 1,913
  - Density: 103/km^{2} (268/sq mi)
- Time zone: UTC+1 (CET)
  - Summer (DST): UTC+2 (CEST)
- Postal code: 88010
- Dialing code: 0963
- Patron saint: Santa Marina

Filandari (Calabrian: Xalandàri; Calabrian Greek: Φιλαντάρις) is a comune (municipality) in the Province of Vibo Valentia in the Italian region Calabria, located about 60 kilometres (37 mi) southwest of Catanzaro and about 7 kilometres (4 mi) southwest of Vibo Valentia. As of 31 December 2004, it had a population of 1,913 and an area of 18.5 square kilometres (7.1 mi^{2}).

Filandari borders the following municipalities: Cessaniti, Jonadi, Mileto, Rombiolo, San Calogero, Vibo Valentia, Zungri.

== Demographic evolution ==
Historical population

| Year | Pop. | ±% |
|---|---|---|
| 1861 | 1,505 | — |
| 1871 | 1,522 | +1.1% |
| 1881 | 1,686 | +10.8% |
| 1901 | 1,990 | +18.0% |
| 1911 | 2,132 | +7.1% |

| Year | Pop. | ±% |
|---|---|---|
| 1921 | 2,169 | +1.7% |
| 1931 | 2,123 | −2.1% |
| 1936 | 2,222 | +4.7% |
| 1951 | 2,437 | +9.7% |
| 1961 | 2,142 | −12.1% |

| Year | Pop. | ±% |
|---|---|---|
| 1971 | 1,910 | −10.8% |
| 1981 | 1,729 | −9.5% |
| 1991 | 1,703 | −1.5% |
| 2001 | 1,839 | +8.0% |

Source: Data from ISTAT
