= Rombiolo =

Rombiolo Rómvos (Greek)
- Comune
- Comune di Rombiolo
- Location within Italy Location within Calabria
- Coordinates: 38°35′31″N 16°0′6″E
- Country: Italy
- Region: Calabria
- Province: Vibo Valentia (VV)
- Frazioni: Pernocari, Moladi, Presinaci, Garavati, Orsigliadi

Area
  - Total: 22.81 km^{2} (8.81 sq mi)
- Elevation: 460 m (1,510 ft)

Population (2018-01-01)
  - Total: 4,730
  - Density: 207/km^{2} (537/sq mi)
- Demonym: Rombiolesi
- Time zone: UTC+1 (CET)
  - Summer (DST): UTC+2 (CEST)
- Postal code: 89841
- Dialing code: 0963
- Patron saint: Michael the Archangel
- Saint day: 29 September
- Website: Official website

Rombiolo (Calabrian: Rumbiòlu) is a town and comune of the province of Vibo Valentia in the Calabria region of southern Italy.

== Geography ==
Rombiolo borders the following municipalities: Filandari, Limbadi, San Calogero, Spilinga, Zungri.
