= Zaccanopoli =

Zaccanopoli Sachanòpolis (Greek)
- Comune
- Comune di Zaccanopoli
- Location within Italy Location within Calabria
- Coordinates: 38°40′N 15°56′E
- Country: Italy
- Region: Calabria
- Province: Province of Vibo Valentia (VV)

Area
  - Total: 6.6 km^{2} (2.5 sq mi)

Population (Dec. 2004)
  - Total: 859
  - Density: 130/km^{2} (340/sq mi)
- Time zone: UTC+1 (CET)
  - Summer (DST): UTC+2 (CEST)
- Postal code: 89867
- Dialing code: 0963
- Patron saint: Maria santissima della neve

Zaccanopoli (Greek: Sachanopolis) is a comune of the province of Vibo Valentia, it possesses around 900 inhabitants.

confinements: Briatico, Drapia, Parghelia, Zambrone, Zungri.

== Population ==
Historical population

Year	Pop.	±%
1861	1,630	—
1871	1,703	+4.5%
1881	1,668	−2.1%
1901	1,694	+1.6%
1911	2,159	+27.4%
1921	2,462	+14.0%
1931	2,207	−10.4%

Year	Pop.	±%
1936	1,217	−44.9%
1951	1,204	−1.1%
1961	1,165	−3.2%
1971	1,089	−6.5%
1981	978	−10.2%
1991	946	−3.3%
2001	888	−6.1%

Source: Data by ISTAT
