= 'Nduja =

Italian spicy, spreadable pork sausage

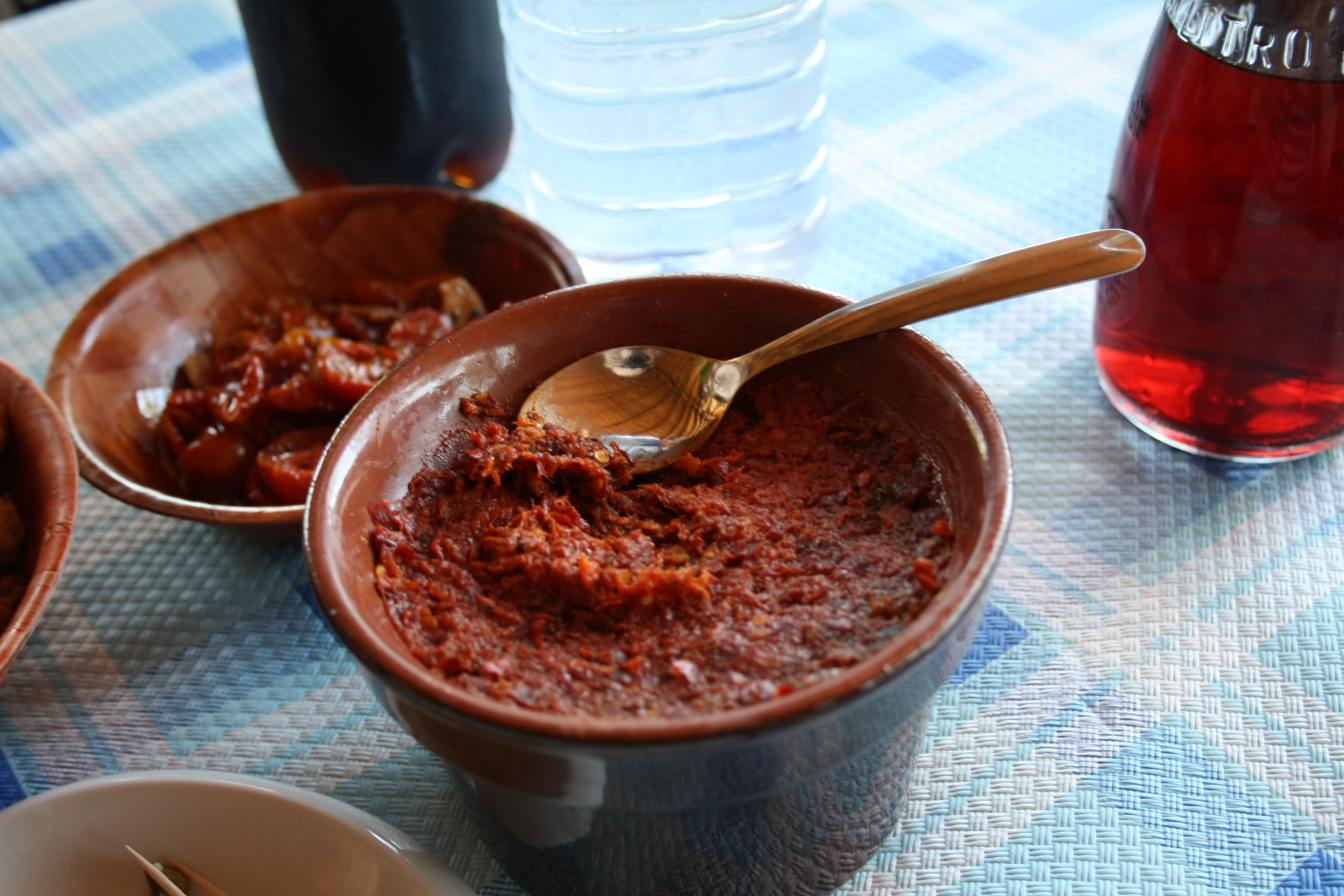
- Alternative names: 'Nduja di Spilinga
- Type: Sauce
- Place of origin: Italy
- Region or state: Calabria
- Main ingredients: Pork sausage

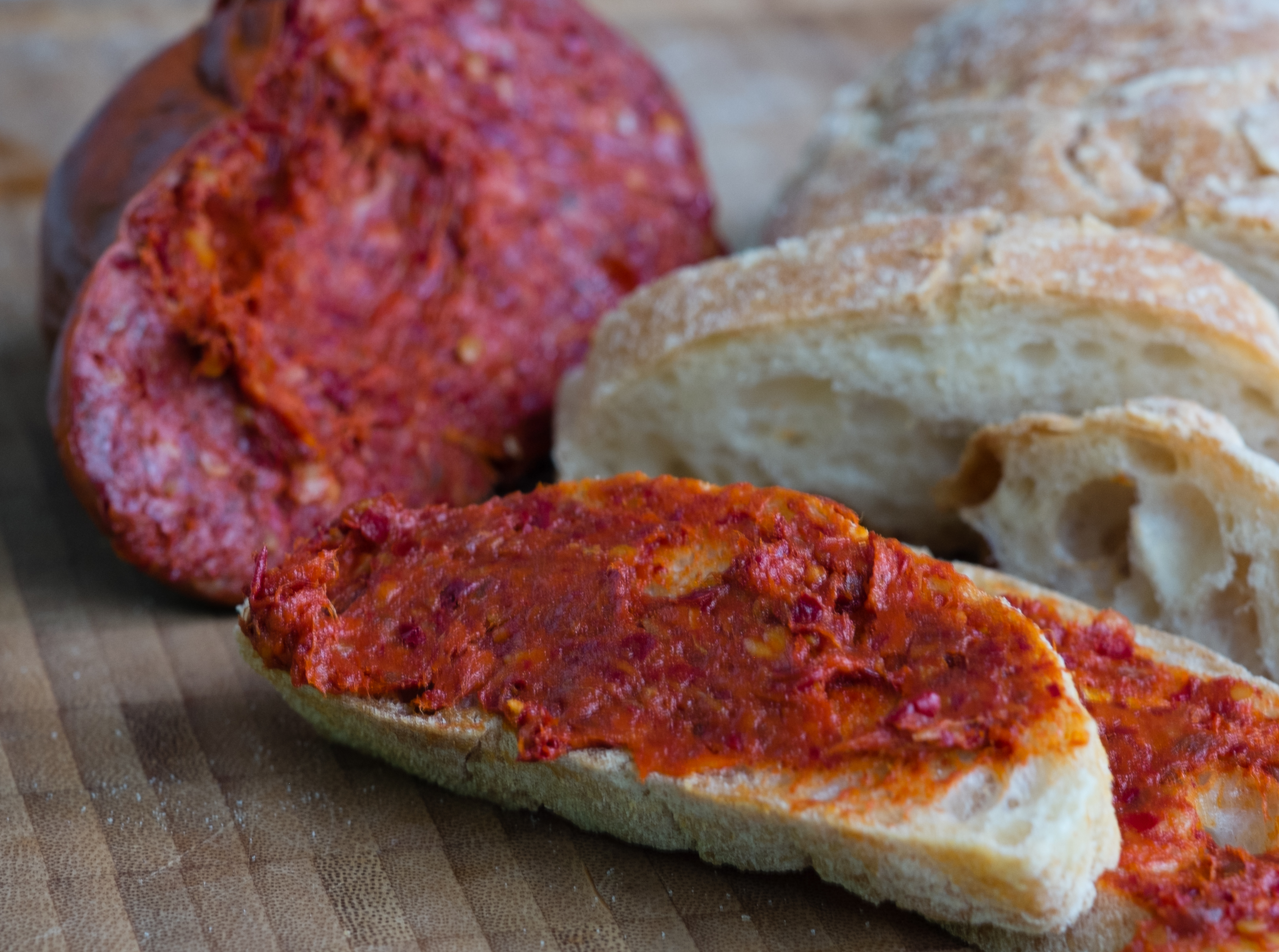
'Nduja with bread, with a piece of 'nduja sausage in background

'Nduja (Calabrian: [nˈduːja]) or 'nduja di Spilinga is a spicy, spreadable pork sausage from the Calabria region of Italy. It is a salume that comes from the area around Spilinga.

'Nduja is made with meat from the trimmings from various meat cuts, offal and fatback, and sun-dried Calabrian chili peppers, which give 'nduja its characteristic fiery taste. These are minced together, then stuffed in large sausage casings and smoked, creating a soft large sausage, which is then aged for 3–6 months. The spicy mixture is scooped out as needed. 'Nduja is mainly served with slices of bread or with ripe cheese. Its unique taste makes it suitable for a variety of dishes.

In the United States and the United Kingdom, 'nduja's popularity boomed around 2015–2016, and it was featured in dishes at a number of restaurants in New York City and London.

== See also ==
- List of spreads
- List of sausages
