= Briatico =

Briatico Vriàticu (Calabrian)
- Comune
- Comune di Briatico
- La Rocchetta

- Location within Italy Location within Calabria
- Coordinates: 38°44′N 16°2′E
- Country: Italy
- Region: Calabria
- Province: Vibo Valentia (VV)
- Frazioni: Conidoni, Mandaradoni, Paradisoni, Potenzoni, San Costantino, San Leo, Sciconi

Area
  - Total: 27.92 km^{2} (10.78 sq mi)
- Elevation: 51 m (167 ft)

Population (2026)
  - Total: 3,578
  - Density: 128.2/km^{2} (331.9/sq mi)
- Demonym: Briaticesi
- Time zone: UTC+1 (CET)
  - Summer (DST): UTC+2 (CEST)
- Postal code: 89817
- Dialing code: 0963
- Patron saint: St. Nicholas of Bari, Madonna Immacolata, Madonna del Carmine
- Saint day: December 6, July 16
- Website: Official website

Briatico (Calabrian: Vriàticu) is a coastal town and comune (municipality) in the Province of Vibo Valentia in the region of Calabria in southern Italy. It has 3,578 inhabitants.

Briatico borders the municipalities of Cessaniti, Vibo Valentia, Zaccanopoli, Zambrone, and Zungri.

== Demographics ==
As of 2026, the population is 3,578, of which 50.7% are males, and 49.3% are females. Minors make up 15.1% of the population, and seniors make up 25.8%.

Historical population

Year	Pop.	±%
1861	3,005	—
1871	3,302	+9.9%
1881	3,287	−0.5%
1901	3,639	+10.7%
1911	3,392	−6.8%
1921	3,909	+15.2%
1931	4,042	+3.4%
1936	4,197	+3.8%

Year	Pop.	±%
1951	4,826	+15.0%
1961	4,390	−9.0%
1971	4,126	−6.0%
1981	4,237	+2.7%
1991	4,333	+2.3%
2001	4,106	−5.2%
2011	3,983	−3.0%
2021	3,781	−5.1%

Source: ISTAT

=== Immigration ===
As of 2025, immigrants make up 6.7% of the population. The 5 largest foreign countries of birth are Morocco, Romania, Germany, Argentina, and Pakistan.
