= Cessaniti =

- Comune
- municipality of Cessaniti
- Location within Italy Location within Calabria
- Coordinates: 38°40′N 16°2′E
- Country: Italy
- Region: Calabria
- Province: Province of Vibo Valentia (VV)
- Frazioni: Favelloni, Mantineo, Pannaconi, Piana Pugliese, San Cono, San Marco

Area
  - Total: 17.9 km^{2} (6.9 sq mi)

Population (Dec. 2004)
  - Total: 3,595
  - Density: 201/km^{2} (520/sq mi)
- Demonym: Cessanitesi
- Time zone: UTC+1 (CET)
  - Summer (DST): UTC+2 (CEST)
- Postal code: 89816
- Dialing code: 0963

Cessaniti (Medieval Greek: Κεσσανιτόν, romanized: Kessanitón; Greek: Kessanites) is a comune (municipality) in the Province of Vibo Valentia in the Italian region Calabria, located about 60 kilometres (37 mi) southwest of Catanzaro and about 4 kilometres (2 mi) west of Vibo Valentia. As of 31 December 2004, it had a population of 3,595 and an area of 17.9 square kilometres (6.9 mi^{2}).

The municipality of Cessaniti contains the frazioni (subdivisions, mainly villages and hamlets) Favelloni, Mantineo, Pannaconi, Piana Pugliese, San Cono, and San Marco.

Cessaniti borders the following municipalities: Briatico, Filandari, Vibo Valentia, Zungri.
