= Jonadi =

Jonadi Ιωνάδες (Greek)
- Comune
- Comune di Jonadi
- Location within Italy Location within Calabria
- Coordinates: 38°38′N 16°3′E
- Country: Italy
- Region: Calabria
- Province: Province of Vibo Valentia (VV)
- Frazioni: Nao, Vena, Baracconi, Case Sparse

Area
  - Total: 8.7 km^{2} (3.4 sq mi)

Population (Dec. 2004)
  - Total: 3,027
  - Density: 350/km^{2} (900/sq mi)
- Demonym: Jonadesi
- Time zone: UTC+1 (CET)
  - Summer (DST): UTC+2 (CEST)
- Postal code: 89900
- Dialing code: 0963
- Website: Official website

Jonadi (Calabrian Greek: Ιωνάδες) is a comune (municipality) in the Province of Vibo Valentia in the Italian region Calabria, located about 60 kilometres (37 mi) southwest of Catanzaro and about 5 kilometres (3 mi) southwest of Vibo Valentia. As of 31 December 2004, it had a population of 3,027 and an area of 8.7 square kilometres (3.4 mi^{2}).

The municipality of Jonadi contains the frazioni (subdivisions, mainly villages and hamlets) Nao, Vena, Baracconi, and Case Sparse.

Jonadi borders the following municipalities: Filandari, Mileto, San Costantino Calabro, San Gregorio d'Ippona, Vibo Valentia.

== Demographic evolution ==
Historical population

Year	Pop.	±%
1861	1,090	—
1871	1,154	+5.9%
1881	999	−13.4%
1901	1,265	+26.6%
1911	1,402	+10.8%

Year	Pop.	±%
1921	1,402	+0.0%
1931	1,464	+4.4%
1936	1,539	+5.1%
1951	1,745	+13.4%
1961	1,627	−6.8%

Year	Pop.	±%
1971	1,432	−12.0%
1981	1,498	+4.6%
1991	1,861	+24.2%
2001	2,662	+43.0%

Source: Data from ISTAT
