= Ricadi =

Ricadi Rigàdion (Griko)
- Comune
- Comune di Ricadi
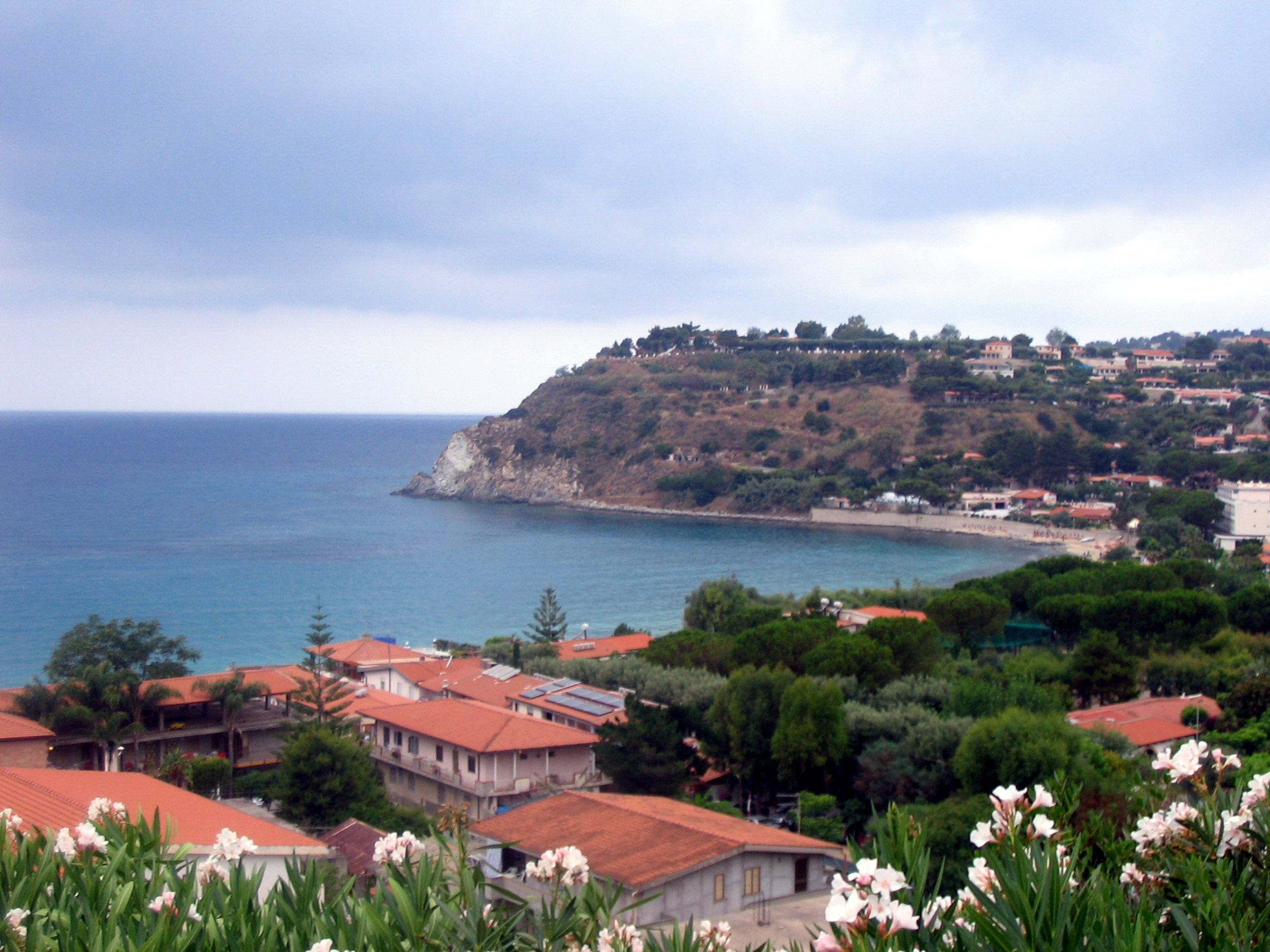
- Sunset over Stromboli with Capo Vaticano on the right; photo from Grotticelle main beach at Ricadi.

- Coat of arms

- Location within Italy Location within Calabria
- Coordinates: 38°37′N 15°52′E
- Country: Italy
- Region: Calabria
- Province: Vibo Valentia (VV)
- Frazioni: Barbalàconi, Brivàdi, Capo Vaticano, Ciaramìti, Lampazòne, Orsigliàdi, Santa Domenica, Santa Maria, San Nicolò

Government
  - Mayor: Extraordinary Commission

Area
  - Total: 22.54 km^{2} (8.70 sq mi)
- Elevation: 285 m (935 ft)

Population (2026)
  - Total: 5,048
  - Density: 224.0/km^{2} (580.0/sq mi)
- Demonym: Ricadesi
- Time zone: UTC+1 (CET)
  - Summer (DST): UTC+2 (CEST)
- Postal code: 89866, 89865
- Dialing code: 0963
- Patron saint: St. Zachary
- Saint day: November 5
- Website: Official website

Ricadi (Ancient Greek: Ρηγάδιον, romanized: Rigádion) is a town and comune (municipality) on the Tyrrhenian coast, in the province of Vibo Valentia in the region of Calabria in southern Italy. It has 5,048 inhabitants.

Ricadi borders the municipalities of Drapia, Joppolo, Spilinga, and Tropea.

== History ==
The origins of Ricadi are unknown. According to legend, it was probably founded at the time of the Saracen invasions, during or after the 10th century. By this time, the Saracens had settled around Rombiolo.

Ricadi appears to have been almost reduced to rubble by the earthquake which struck towards the end of the 18th century, it was also heavily damaged by the one which struck at the beginning of the 20th century.

The place-name 'Ricade' or 'Rigade' appeared for the first time in the 16th and 17th centuries, and suggests a derivation from the surname 'Riga' or 'Rigà', which was quite surname in Calabria.

Over the centuries Ricadi has been populated by Greeks, Romans, Byzantines, and Normans: they built and blasted road and defensive infrastructures (roads, bridges, towers defending coasts and rivers). Many archaeological discoveries are still visible; others are well protected, being houses in the National Museum of Reggio Calabria.

For a time, Ricadi was ancillary to the town of Tropea. In 1799 the Ricadesi obtained their independence thanks to Championnet, a French general who conquered the Kingdom of Naples (which Ricadi was formerly part of).

Ricadi became a municipality of the Monteleone district (now Vibo Valentia), belonging to Calabria Ulteriore, because of a rule set in 1811.

Before becoming one of the main tourist destinations of the lower Tyrrhennian Sea, Grotticelle was populated by people who lived on agriculture and fishing. By the mid '80s, this place became one of the main economic driving force of the overall economy of Ricadi. Thanks to tourism, over the past decades, incomes and living standards have increasingly improved for local inhabitants (according to some, the per capita income of the town is one of the highest in Calabria).

Near Grotticelle hundreds of tourist structures have been built: these include camping-sites, tourist villages located near the sea, 2 to 5 star hotels, residences and farm holidays located in the hills.

== Geography ==
The municipality of Ricadi is located between the gulfs of Lamezia Terme and Gioia Tauro. Capo Vaticano lies between these two gulfs.

The Tyrrhenian Sea touches Ricadi to the west. The municipality has about 12 kilometres (7 mi) of coasts.

=== Winds ===
The following winds blow along the coast of Ricadi:

- the Sirocco, a hot, dry wind originating in the Sahara desert (it blows from the South-East);
- the Libeccio, a humid westerly wind which frequently makes the sea rough and may form violent westerly squalls.
- the Mistral, a dry cold northerly wind which blows in winter.

== Demographics ==
As of 2026, the population is 5,048, of which 51.4% are males, and 48.6% are females. Minors make up 15.3% of the population, and seniors make up 24.1%.

Historical population

Year	Pop.	±%
1861	2,488	—
1871	2,899	+16.5%
1881	2,785	−3.9%
1901	3,618	+29.9%
1911	3,971	+9.8%
1921	4,129	+4.0%
1931	4,005	−3.0%
1936	4,095	+2.2%

Year	Pop.	±%
1951	4,584	+11.9%
1961	4,035	−12.0%
1971	3,689	−8.6%
1981	3,696	+0.2%
1991	4,169	+12.8%
2001	4,429	+6.2%
2011	4,750	+7.2%
2021	4,959	+4.4%

Source: ISTAT

=== Immigration ===
As of 2025, immigrants make up 12.3% of the population. The 5 largest foreign countries of birth are Ukraine, Romania, Bulgaria, Argentina, and Poland.

== Culture ==
"The Farming Museum" (Italian: Museo d’Arte Contadina), opened to the public in May 1992. The collection, made up by near to 500 finds, shows variety rudimentary farming machinery, tools to process local crops such as flax and broom fibre, and terracotta ware. Housed by the Giuseppe Berto Conference Centre, the collection is on permanent display.

=== Events ===
- "Giuseppe Berto Literary Prize" (Italian: Premio Letterario Giuseppe Berto). The writer Giuseppe Berto was born in Mogliano Veneto, but made Capo Vaticano his second home. The Prize is awarded every June, in Ricadi and Mogliano Veneto on alternative years. The 2003 edition marked a turning point, since the prize was divided into two separate categories: the historical one to be awarded to an emerging writer, and a new category focusing on foreign fiction. The latter prize is awarded to a living author whose work has been published in Italian.
- "Capo Vaticano Sporting Prize" (Italian: Premio Sportivo Capo Vaticano), every year in September. Established in 1987, the Capo Vaticano Sporting Prize has the objective of recognizing and promoting the educational value of football, as well as uniting all those who are fond of Calabria. It is awarded to Italian referees, footballers and journalists of regional and national renown.
- "Red Onion Festival" (Italian: La Sagra della Cipolla Rossa), every year on 13 August. The festival starts in the mid-afternoon with a variety of games are played in Piazza Marconi, the main square of the village:

The traditional Pignàta Tournament in which the contestants are blindfolded and, helped by bystanders, use a long wooden stick to break one or more pignàtas, or terra-cotta pots, which are suspended from a string. Pignàtas are sometimes filled with water. The ""Bumbuleju" Race is for women of all ages. Contestants race from one end of the square to the other, carrying the terra-cotta pot on their heads without using their hands. Other games include the Egg Race, the Sack Race, the Mini-marathon, the Onion Race, the Cheese-rolling tournament; Typical onion-dish sampling starts at dinner time. At exactly midnight the Camejuzzu i Focu dance is performed. The traditional fireworks display closes the festival.

- "Ice-Cream Festival": each summer, in July.

=== Festivities ===
- Religious Festivities are solemnized in honor of Saint Zaccaria (the Patron Saint – on 5 November); Saint Biagio (on 3 February), Saint Antonio from Padua (on 13 June); Saint Domenica (on 6 July); Virgin Mary of Graces (on 15 August).

== Associations ==
- "Friends of Giuseppe Berto" (the panel of judges for the literary prize)
- "Noi di Ricadi" (people from Ricadi – editorial staff of Terra Nostra newspaper)

== Economy ==
=== Agriculture ===
Cipolla Rossa di Tropea, famous red onions from Tropea, are grown all along the coast. They are then processed and shipped throughout Italy, northern Europe, and elsewhere. In addition, vegetables, citruses (oranges, lemons, bergamots) and ‘nduja, a salami made from seasoned pork and red hot pepper, are produced;

=== Fishing ===
Flatfish, tuna, bass, dentex, sea bream, conger, mullet, moray, polypus.

=== Tourism ===
The three bays of Grotticelle ("little caves") are the most famous and most evocative bathing places of the municipality of Ricadi, in Calabria and they are linked with Capo Vaticano (Cape Vatican). Smaller, more remote and evocative beaches can be reached from Grotticelle.

== Twin towns – sister cities ==
- Mogliano Veneto, Italy
