= Zambrone =

Zambrone Zambrònë (Calabrian)
- Comune
- Comune di Zambrone
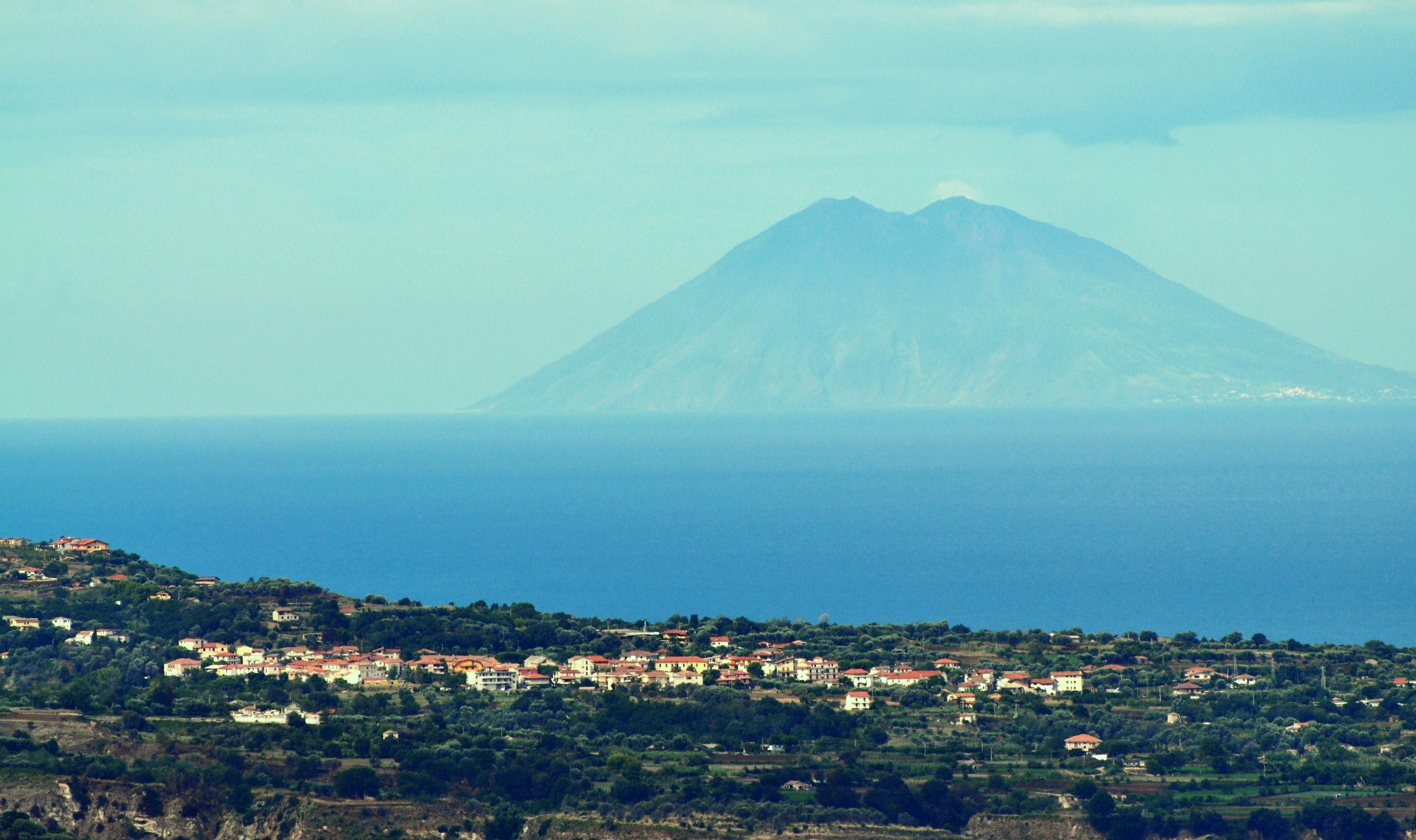
- View of Zambrone and Stromboli

- Location within Italy Location within Calabria
- Coordinates: 38°42′N 15°59′E
- Country: Italy
- Region: Calabria
- Province: Vibo Valentia (VV)

Area
  - Total: 15.77 km^{2} (6.09 sq mi)

Population (2026)
  - Total: 1,766
  - Density: 112.0/km^{2} (290.0/sq mi)
- Time zone: UTC+1 (CET)
  - Summer (DST): UTC+2 (CEST)
- Postal code: 88030
- Dialing code: 0963

Zambrone (Calabrian: Zambrònë) is a town and comune (municipality) in the Province of Vibo Valentia in the region of Calabria in southern Italy, located about 60 kilometres (37 mi) southwest of Catanzaro and about 9 kilometres (6 mi) northwest of Vibo Valentia. It has 1,766 inhabitants.

Zambrone borders the municipalities of Briatico, Parghelia, and Zaccanopoli.

The town was home to southern Italy's first water park, Aquapark di Zambrone, prior to its closure in 2007.

== Demographics ==
As of 2026, the population is 1,766, of which 48.9% are males, and 51.1% are females. Minors make up 17.2% of the population, and seniors make up 24.0%.

Historical population

| Year | Pop. | ±% |
|---|---|---|
| 1861 | 1,251 | — |
| 1871 | 1,372 | +9.7% |
| 1881 | 1,326 | −3.4% |
| 1901 | 1,711 | +29.0% |
| 1911 | 2,072 | +21.1% |
| 1921 | 2,129 | +2.8% |
| 1931 | 1,972 | −7.4% |
| 1936 | 1,984 | +0.6% |

| Year | Pop. | ±% |
|---|---|---|
| 1951 | 2,128 | +7.3% |
| 1961 | 1,975 | −7.2% |
| 1971 | 1,902 | −3.7% |
| 1981 | 1,694 | −10.9% |
| 1991 | 1,768 | +4.4% |
| 2001 | 1,743 | −1.4% |
| 2011 | 1,805 | +3.6% |
| 2021 | 1,784 | −1.2% |

Source: ISTAT

=== Immigration ===
As of 2025, immigrants make up 7.6% of the population. The 5 largest foreign countries of birth are Romania, Argentina, Russia, Germany, and the United Kingdom.
