= Limbadi =

Limbadi Griko: Lymbados
- Comune
- Comune di Limbadi
- Location within Italy Location within Calabria
- Coordinates: 38°34′N 15°58′E
- Country: Italy
- Region: Calabria
- Province: Province of Vibo Valentia (VV)
- Frazioni: Badia di Limbadi, Caroni, Mandaradoni, Motta Filocastro, San Nicola De Legistis

Area
  - Total: 28.9 km^{2} (11.2 sq mi)
- Elevation: 229 m (751 ft)

Population (Dec. 2004)
  - Total: 3,688
  - Density: 128/km^{2} (331/sq mi)
- Demonym: Limbadesi
- Time zone: UTC+1 (CET)
  - Summer (DST): UTC+2 (CEST)
- Postal code: 89844
- Dialing code: 0963

Limbadi (Greek: Lymbados) is a comune (municipality) in the Province of Vibo Valentia in the Italian region Calabria, located about 70 kilometres (43 mi) southwest of Catanzaro and about 15 kilometres (9 mi) southwest of Vibo Valentia. As of 31 December 2004, it had a population of 3,688 and an area of 28.9 square kilometres (11.2 mi^{2}).

The municipality of Limbadi contains the frazioni (subdivisions, mainly villages and hamlets) Badia di Limbadi, Caroni, Mandaradoni, Motta Filocastro, and San Nicola De Legistis.

Limbadi borders the following municipalities: Candidoni, Nicotera, Rombiolo, San Calogero, Spilinga.

== Demographic evolution ==
Historical population

Year	Pop.	±%
1861	3,350	—
1871	3,417	+2.0%
1881	3,582	+4.8%
1901	5,041	+40.7%
1911	5,310	+5.3%

Year	Pop.	±%
1921	5,388	+1.5%
1931	5,163	−4.2%
1936	5,246	+1.6%
1951	5,167	−1.5%
1961	4,764	−7.8%

Year	Pop.	±%
1971	3,572	−25.0%
1981	3,652	+2.2%
1991	3,627	−0.7%
2001	3,630	+0.1%

Source: Data from ISTAT
