= Drapia =

Drapia Griko: Ydrapia
- Comune
- Comune di Drapia
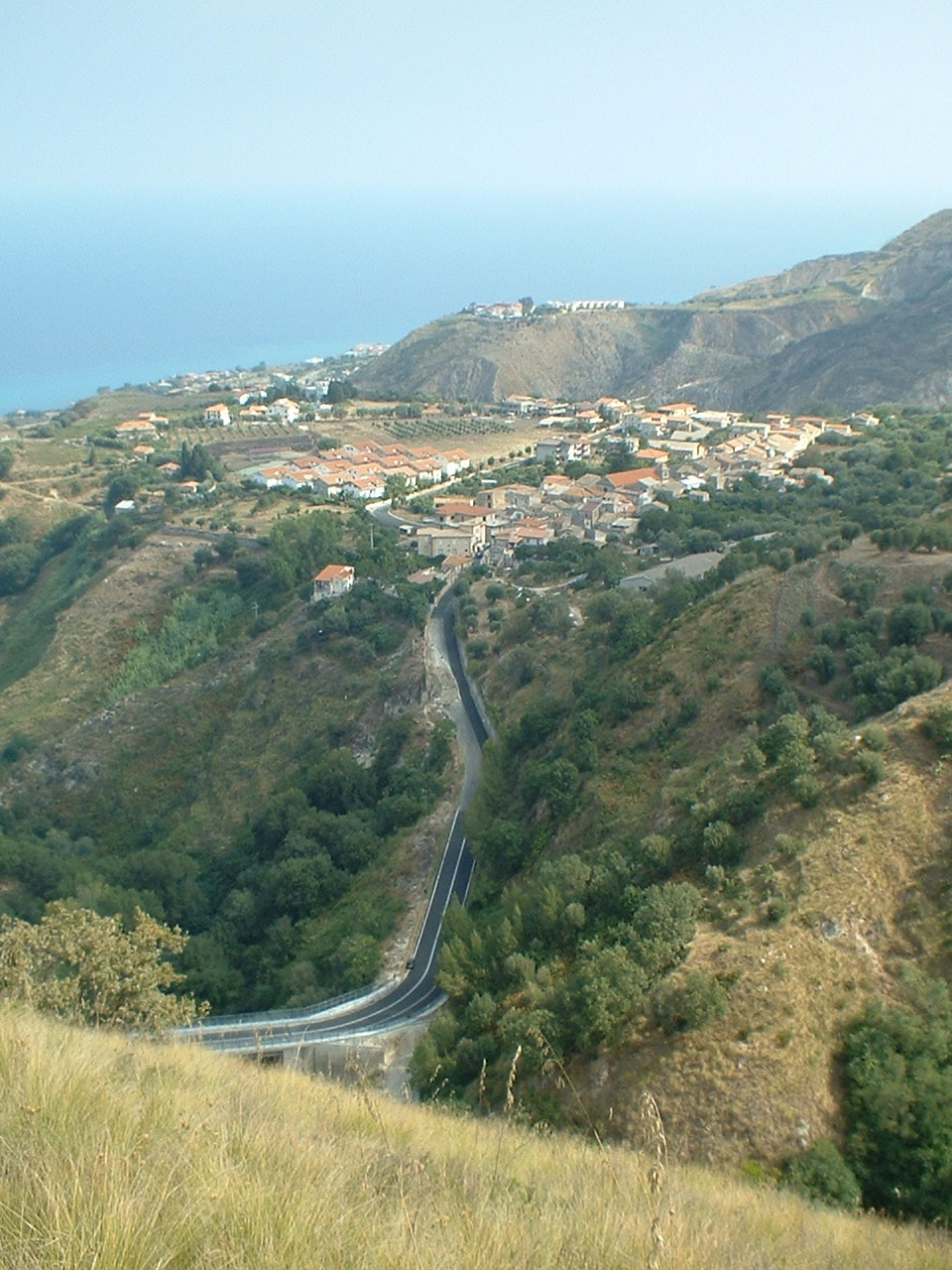
- Drapia seen from the Cardillo Hill.

- Location within Italy Location within Calabria
- Coordinates: 38°40′N 15°55′E
- Country: Italy
- Region: Calabria
- Province: Province of Vibo Valentia (VV)
- Frazioni: Brattirò, Carìa, Gàsponi, Sant'Angelo

Government
  - Mayor: Alessandro Porcelli

Area
  - Total: 21.5 km^{2} (8.3 sq mi)
- Elevation: 262 m (860 ft)

Population (2007)
  - Total: 2,181
  - Density: 101/km^{2} (263/sq mi)
- Demonym(s): Brattiroesi, Cariesi, Drapiesi, Gasponesi
- Time zone: UTC+1 (CET)
  - Summer (DST): UTC+2 (CEST)
- Postal code: 89862
- Dialing code: 0963
- Patron saint: Saint Sergio martyr
- Saint day: October, 7
- Website: http://www.comune.drapia.vv.it/

Drapia (Ancient Greek, Medieval Greek: Τραπειανή, romanized: Trapiané, Greek: Ydrapia) is a comune (municipality) in the Province of Vibo Valentia in the Italian region Calabria, located about 60 kilometres (37 mi) southwest of Catanzaro and about 14 kilometres (9 mi) west of Vibo Valentia. As of December 31, 2016, it had a population of 2,082 and an area of 21.5 square kilometres (8.3 mi^{2}).

The municipality of Drapia contains the frazioni (subdivisions, mainly villages and hamlets) Brattirò, Carìa, Gàsponi, and Sant'Angelo.

Drapia borders the following municipalities: Parghelia, Ricadi, Spilinga, Tropea, Zaccanopoli, Zungri.

== Demographic evolution ==
Historical population

Year	Pop.	±%
1861	2,750	—
1871	2,584	−6.0%
1881	2,988	+15.6%
1901	3,331	+11.5%
1911	4,063	+22.0%

Year	Pop.	±%
1921	4,390	+8.0%
1931	3,844	−12.4%
1936	3,287	−14.5%
1951	3,172	−3.5%
1961	3,044	−4.0%

Year	Pop.	±%
1971	2,672	−12.2%
1981	2,461	−7.9%
1991	2,444	−0.7%
2001	2,193	−10.3%
2011	2,102	−4.1%

Source: Data from ISTAT
