= Nicotera =

Nicotera Griko: Nikòptera
- Comune
- Comune di Nicotera
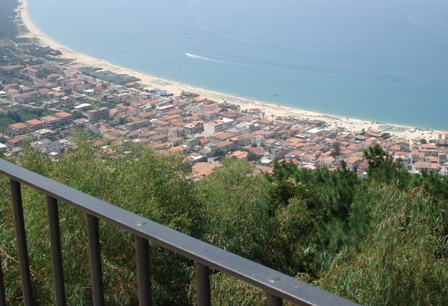

- Coat of arms

- Location within Italy Location within Calabria
- Coordinates: 38°33′N 15°56′E
- Country: Italy
- Region: Calabria
- Province: Vibo Valentia (VV)
- Frazioni: Comèrconi, Marina, Preìtoni, Badia di Nicotera

Government
  - Mayor: Francesco Pagano

Area
  - Total: 32 km^{2} (12 sq mi)
- Elevation: 220 m (720 ft)

Population (2007)
  - Total: 6,487
  - Density: 200/km^{2} (530/sq mi)
- Demonym: Nicoteresi
- Time zone: UTC+1 (CET)
  - Summer (DST): UTC+2 (CEST)
- Postal code: 89844
- Dialing code: 0963
- Patron saint: Saint Joseph; Assumption of Mary
- Saint day: 19 March; 15 August
- Website: Official website

Nicotera (Calabrian: Nicòtra; Ancient Greek: Νικόπτερα, romanized: Nikóptera) is a comune (municipality) in the province of Vibo Valentia, Calabria, southern Italy.

== History ==
The origins of Nicòtera lie with the ancient Greek city of Medma, which was founded by the Locresis of Epizephyrian Locris.

During the period of Roman domination, it survived only in the form of the emporium (port), near today's Nicotera Marina. A Christian bishopric see is attested in Nicotera during the Middle Ages.

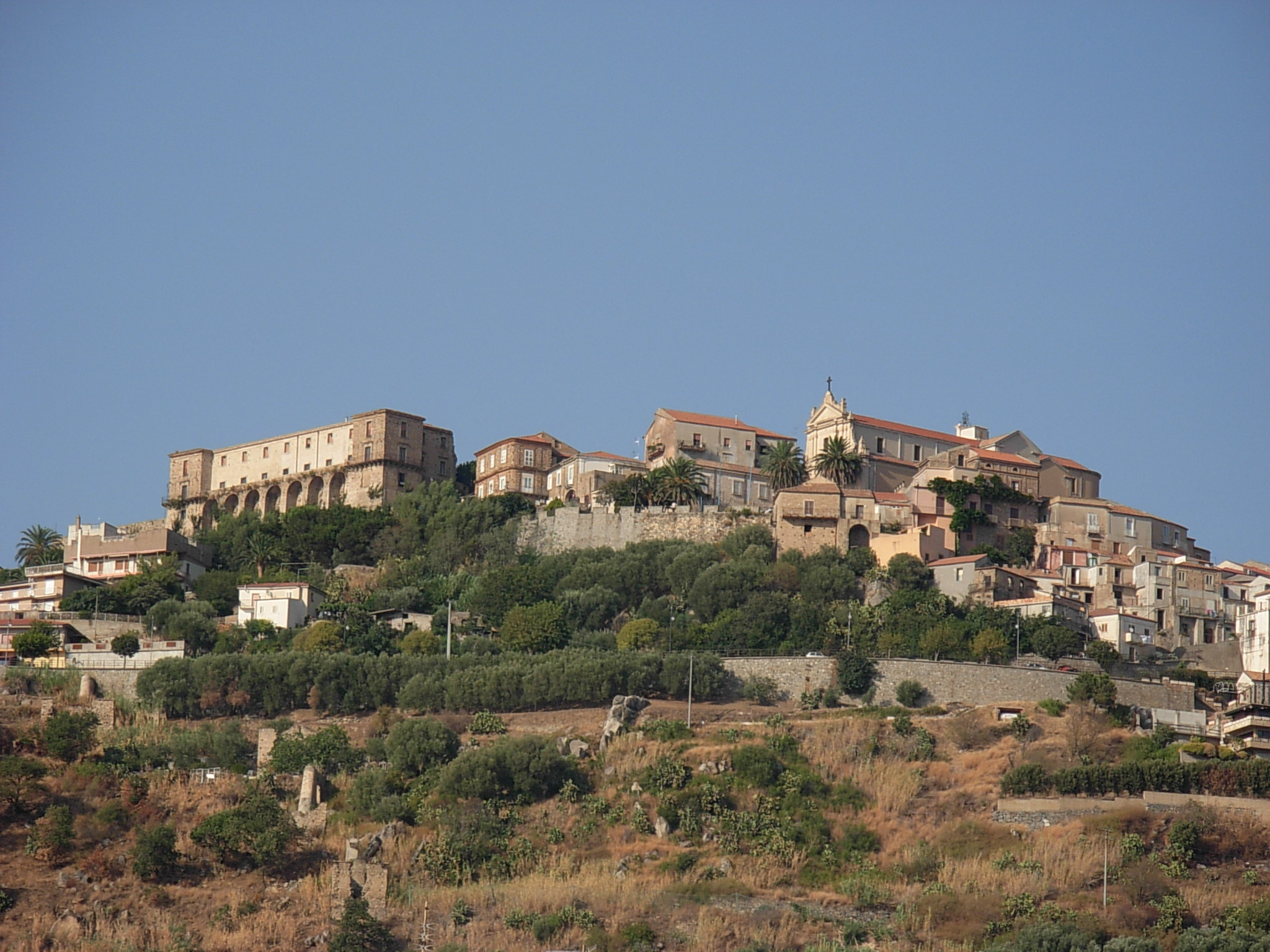
View of the upper town with the castle on the left

In 1065 Robert Guiscard – enlarging his Principate of Salerno – seized it from the Byzantine Empire, and the town grew around the castle and the cathedral built under the Normans. In 1122, Nicotera was attacked by an Almoravid fleet: some of the populace were killed while the rest were taken and sold into slavery.

Under Holy Roman Emperor Frederick II Nicotera attained economic wealth. To encourage commerce and industry, Frederick promoted Jewish settlement in the area called "Giudecca", a ghetto area near the castle, in which Jews lived under the protection of the Bishop of Nicotera, and enjoyed protection from Christian persecution.

In 1282, the naval Battle of Nicotera took place off the coast of the town between the fleets of Angevin Naples and the Kingdom of Aragon. Part of the War of the Sicilian Vespers, the battle ended in an Aragonese victory.

In the 15th century, under the rule of Alfonso of Aragon, the town came under the yoke of feudalism and fell into decay. In 1806 the French Revolution swept away the feudal system in Nicotera. After the restoration of Ferdinand I of the Two Sicilies, Nicotera continued to be the chief town of the district, with what are now the modern communes of Joppolo and Limbadi as its dependencies.
