= Fabrizia =

- Comune
- Comune di Fabrizia
- Coat of arms

- Location within Italy Location within Calabria
- Coordinates: 38°28′N 16°18′E
- Country: Italy
- Region: Calabria
- Province: Vibo Valentia (VV)

Government
  - Mayor: Antonio Minniti

Area
  - Total: 38 km^{2} (15 sq mi)
- Elevation: 947 m (3,107 ft)

Population (2007)
  - Total: 2,538
  - Density: 67/km^{2} (170/sq mi)
- Demonym: Fabriziesi prunarisi
- Time zone: UTC+1 (CET)
  - Summer (DST): UTC+2 (CEST)
- Postal code: 88020
- Dialing code: 0963
- Patron saint: St. Anthony of Padua
- Saint day: 13 June
- Website: Official website

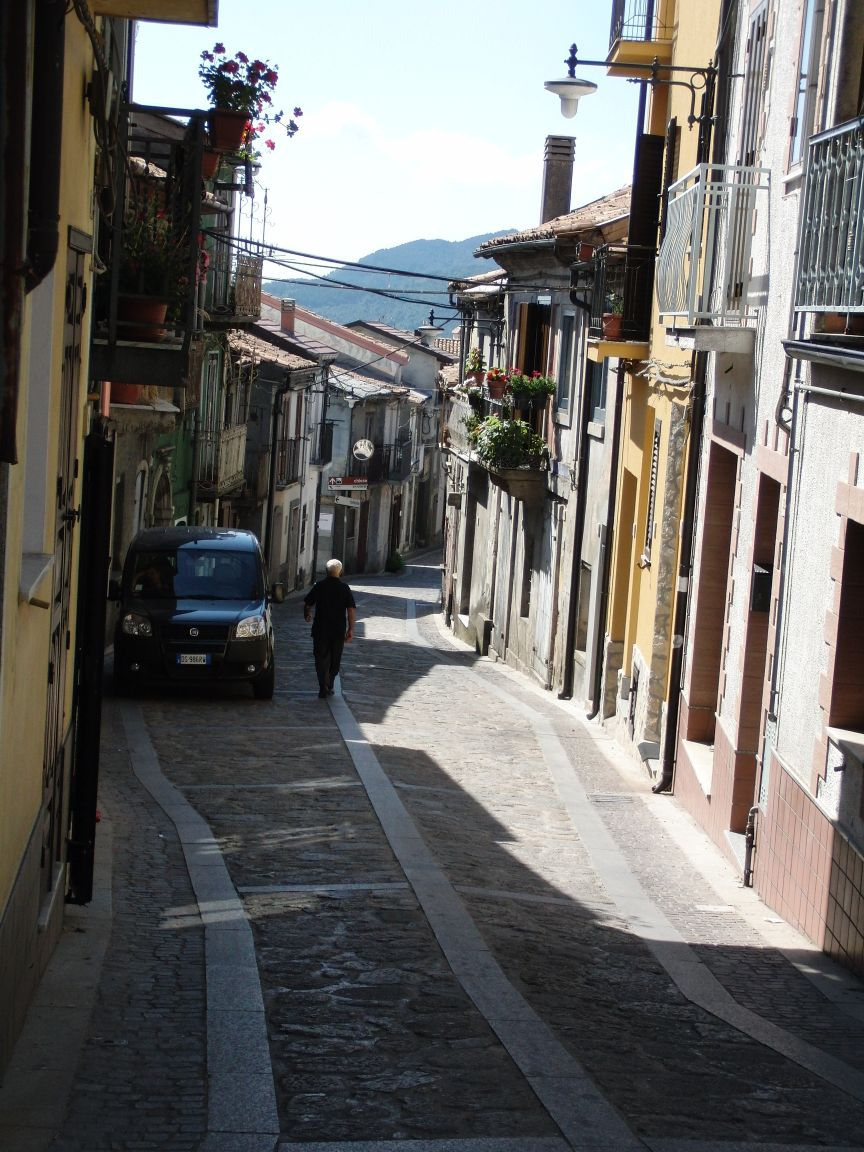
Street in Fabrizia

Fabrizia is a small mountain town in Calabria, Italy, part of the Province of Vibo Valentia.

The territory is in the mountain range of the Serre Calabresi starting at the Limina pass and ends at the isthmus of Catanzaro, the narrowest point of Italy, where 35 kilometers separating the Ionian Sea from Tyrrhenian Sea. Le Serre confine to the South with the Aspromonte and the plain of Palmi, to the North with the La Sila. The territory lies in the provinces of Reggio Calabria, Vibo Valentia and Catanzaro.

Fabrizia is the only village of the Serre Calabresi to have a view of the Ionian Sea:

A sizable community of Italians from Fabrizia and their descendants reside in Sydney, Australia.
