= Province of Vibo Valentia =

Province of Italy

Coordinates: 38°40′31″N 16°5′45.24″E

Province of Vibo Valentia Provincia di Vibo Valentia (Italian) Pruvincia i Vibbu Valenzia (Vibonese)
- Province
- Flag Coat of arms

- Location of the province of Vibo Valentia in Italy
- Country: Italy
- Region: Calabria
- Capital(s): Vibo Valentia
- Municipalities: 50

Government
  - President: Franco Barbalace (acting)

Area
  - Total: 1,150.64 km^{2} (444.26 sq mi)

Population (2026)
  - Total: 149,922
  - Density: 130.294/km^{2} (337.461/sq mi)

GDP
  - Total: €2.447 billion (2015)
  - Per capita: €15,032 (2015)
- Time zone: UTC+1 (CET)
  - Summer (DST): UTC+2 (CEST)
- Postal code: 89811-89819, 89821-89824, 89831-89834, 89841-89844, 89851-89852, 89861-89868, 89900
- Telephone prefix: 0963, 0966, 0968
- Vehicle registration: VV
- ISTAT code: 102

The province of Vibo Valentia (Italian: provincia di Vibo Valentia; Vibonese: pruvincia i Vibbu Valenzia) is a province in the region of Calabria in southern Italy, Its capital is the city of Vibo Valentia and its vehicle licence plate code is VV.

The province has a population of 149,922 in an area of 1,150.64 square kilometres (444.26 sq mi) across its 50 municipalities.

== History ==
Vibo Valentia is a mountainous province situated on the Tyrrhenian Sea. The region was first settled by an Italic tribe, the Sicels, and then colonised by the Greeks in the 6th or 7th century BCE. The modern city of Vibo Valentia was originally known as Hipponion. It was later recolonised by people from the city of Locri in the region of Calabria. Dionysius I of Syracuse partially destroyed Hipponion, which was later rebuilt and ruled in succession by Carthage, by an indigenous people known as the Bruttii, by the tyrant Agathocles of Syracuse, and then by the Locrians, before being conquered by the Romans around 230 BCE. After about 400 CE the region was attacked repeatedly. The Holy Roman Emperor Frederick II rebuilt the town in the 13th century, and in 1284 it passed to the Ruffo family. Ferdinand I of Naples constructed a fort in Pizzo Calabro in 1486.

The current province was set up by a national law of 6 March 1992, which came into effect on 1 January 1996, and formerly part of the province of Catanzaro.

In June 2010 a dormant volcano was discovered off the coast of the province on the line of the fault that led to the 1905 Calabria earthquake.

== Government ==
=== Municipalities ===
The province has 50 municipalities:

- Acquaro
- Arena
- Briatico
- Brognaturo
- Capistrano
- Cessaniti
- Dasà
- Dinami
- Drapia
- Fabrizia
- Filadelfia
- Filandari
- Filogaso
- Francavilla Angitola
- Francica
- Gerocarne
- Jonadi
- Joppolo
- Limbadi
- Maierato
- Mileto
- Mongiana
- Monterosso Calabro
- Nardodipace
- Nicotera
- Parghelia
- Pizzo
- Pizzoni
- Polia
- Ricadi
- Rombiolo
- San Calogero
- San Costantino Calabro
- San Gregorio d'Ippona
- San Nicola da Crissa
- Sant'Onofrio
- Serra San Bruno
- Simbario
- Sorianello
- Soriano Calabro
- Spadola
- Spilinga
- Stefanaconi
- Tropea
- Vallelonga
- Vazzano
- Vibo Valentia
- Zaccanopoli
- Zambrone
- Zungri

== Demographics ==
As of 2026, the population is 149,922, of which 49.6% are male, and 50.4% are female. Minors make up 15.0% of the population, and seniors make up 25.0%.

Historical population

| Year | Pop. | ±% |
|---|---|---|
| 1861 | 128,323 | — |
| 1871 | 134,995 | +5.2% |
| 1881 | 136,352 | +1.0% |
| 1901 | 162,667 | +19.3% |
| 1911 | 172,799 | +6.2% |
| 1921 | 180,218 | +4.3% |
| 1931 | 183,808 | +2.0% |
| 1936 | 183,454 | −0.2% |

| Year | Pop. | ±% |
|---|---|---|
| 1951 | 206,533 | +12.6% |
| 1961 | 199,811 | −3.3% |
| 1971 | 184,084 | −7.9% |
| 1981 | 176,366 | −4.2% |
| 1991 | 179,640 | +1.9% |
| 2001 | 170,746 | −5.0% |
| 2011 | 163,409 | −4.3% |
| 2021 | 151,558 | −7.3% |

Source: ISTAT

=== Immigration ===
As of 2025, immigrants make up 7.9% of the population. The 5 largest foreign countries of birth are Argentina, Romania, Morocco, Ukraine, and Bulgaria.
