= Joppolo =

Municipality in Calabria, Italy

Joppolo Iámbolos (Greek)
- Comune
- Comune di Joppolo
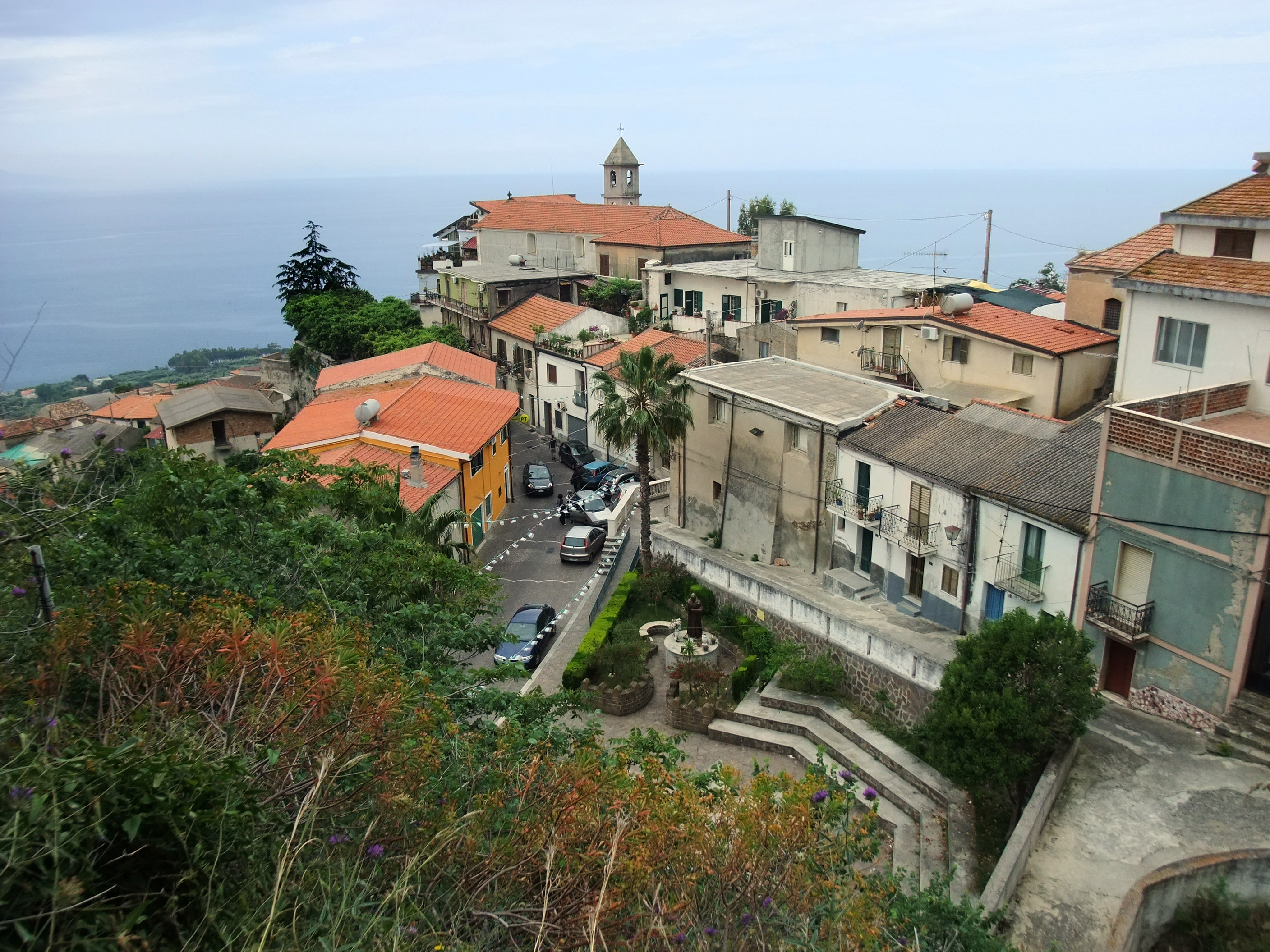

- Flag

- Location within Italy Location within Calabria
- Coordinates: 38°35′N 15°54′E
- Country: Italy
- Region: Calabria
- Province: Vibo Valentia (VV)
- Frazioni: Caroniti, Coccorinello, Coccorino, Monte Poro

Government
  - Mayor: Salvatore Giuseppe Vecchio

Area
  - Total: 15.3 km^{2} (5.9 sq mi)

Population (2007)
  - Total: 2,140
  - Density: 140/km^{2} (362/sq mi)
- Demonym: Joppolesi
- Time zone: UTC+1 (CET)
  - Summer (DST): UTC+2 (CEST)
- Postal code: 89863
- Dialing code: 0963

Joppolo (Medieval Greek: Ιάμπολος, romanized: Iámbolos) is a comune (municipality) in the Province of Vibo Valentia in the Italian region of Calabria, located about 70 kilometres (43 mi) southwest of Catanzaro and about 20 kilometres (12 mi) southwest of Vibo Valentia.

== Notable people ==
- Januarius (died 305), patron saint of Naples, is thought to have been born here.
