= Languages of Calabria =

The primary languages of Calabria are the Italian language as well as regional varieties of Extreme Southern Italian and Neapolitan languages, all collectively known as Calabrian (Italian: calabrese). In addition, there are speakers of the Arbëresh variety of Albanian, as well as Calabrian Greek speakers and pockets of Occitan.

== Calabrian (calabrese) ==
Calabrian (Italian: calabrese) refers to the Romance varieties spoken in Calabria, Italy. The varieties of Calabria are part of a strong dialect continuum that are generally recognizable as Calabrian, but that are usually divided into two different language groups:

- In the southern two-thirds of the region, the Calabrian varieties are grouped as Central-Southern Calabrian, and are usually classified as part of Extreme Southern Italian (italiano meridionale estremo) language group
- In the northern one-third of the region, the Calabrian dialects are often classified typologically with Neapolitan language (it: napoletano calabrese) and are called Northern Calabrian or just Cosentian.

The Amantea-Cirò line is generally considered an approximate demarcation between the Neapolitan and Extreme Southern Italian groups.

The linguistic division roughly corresponds with the historic administrative division already in place since medieval times: Calabria Citeriore (or Latin Calabria) and Calabria Ulteriore (or Greek Calabria). This is a broad generalization and many communities in the more central parts of the region exhibit features of both language groups.

The dialects of Calabria have been extensively studied, catalogued and commented upon by German philologist Gerhard Rohlfs. From the mid-1920s to the mid-1970s, he traveled the region extensively and assembled a very extensive, multi-volume dictionary.

English	Southern Calabrian	Northern Calabrian	Italian
tomorrow	rumàni	crai / dumàni	domani
in the meantime	asciatàntu / shramènti	interimme	Nel frattempo
the day before last	avantèri	nustierzu	L'altro ieri
to yawn	sbadigghjàri	alare/galà	sbadigliare

== Central–Southern Calabrian ==
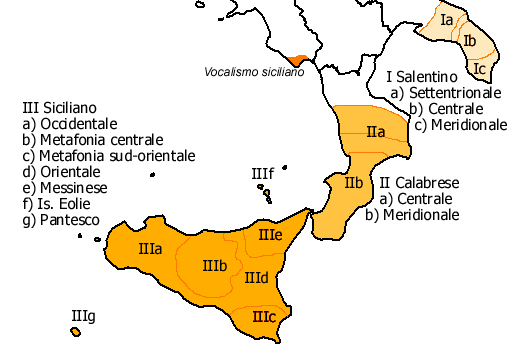
Map showing the distribution of Sicilian type dialects across Calabria and Italy

The Central–Southern Calabrian (calavrisi or calabbrisi) dialects are largely spoken in the provinces of Reggio Calabria, Vibo Valentia, Catanzaro, almost all that of Crotone and, depending on classifications, the grouping can also encompass the varieties of southern Cilentan and southern Salentino. The term Sicilian-Calabrian is also used to distinguish the group from the Northern Calabrian group. It comprises Central Calabrian and Southern Calabrian.

The primary roots of the dialects is Latin. Southern and Central Calabrian dialects are strongly influenced by a Greek substratum and ensuing levels of Latin influence and other external Southern Italian superstrata, in part hindered by geography, resulted in the many local variations found between the idioms of Calabria. Nonetheless, the dialects have some influence from other languages, thanks to the periodic rule and influx of other cultures. As a result, French, Occitan and Spanish have left an imprint.

Central-Southern Calabrian	Greek	Albanian	Sicilian	Italian	French	English
batràci	βάτραχος	bretkosë	larunchia	ranocchio	grenouille	frog
zinnapòtamu	κυνοπόταμος	vidër	lutra	lontra	loutre	otter
bampurìddha / lampurìdda / vampurìddha	λαμπυρίδα	xixëllonjë	-	lucciola	luciole	firefly
purtuàllu	πορτοκάλι	portokall	partugaḍḍu	arancia	orange	orange
'nnaca	νάκη	djep	naca	culla	berceau	cradle
tuppitiàri	τύπτω	godit	(at)tuppari	battere	battre	to hit

French and Norman vocabulary entered the region via the kingdoms of the Normans and the Angevins in Calabria.

Central-Southern Calabrian	Norman or French	Sicilian	Italian	English
'ccattari	accater (cf. accapitāre)	(a)ccattari	comprare	to buy
'nduja	andouille	sausizzuḍḍa	salsicciotto	type of sausage
buccirìa	boucherie	(v)uccirìa	macelleria	butcher's
arrocculàri	reculer	(a)rruccul(j)ari/(a)rruzzulari	rotolare	to recoil
raggia	rage	raggia	rabbia	anger
sciarabàllu	carriole (char à bancs)	(menzu) scarruzziatu	veicolo sbatacchiato	charabanc
travagghiari	travailler	travagghiari	lavorare	to work

Other words derived from Spanish, Catalan, and Occitan:

- capezza – cabeza (Spanish) – head
- scupetta – escopeta (Spanish) – rifle
- muccaturi – mocador (Catalan) – tissue
- prescia – pressa (Catalan) – precipitation
- timpa – timba (Catalan) – abrupt
- addhumari – allumar (Occitan, French, Provençal) – light up
- truppicari – trompicar (Spanish) – trip

=== Conjugations ===
==== Èssiri (to be) ====
	Present	Imperfect	Past simple	Subjunctive present	Subjunctive imperfect
(j)eu	sugnu	era	fuja	chi fussi	fussi
tu(ni)	si'	eri	fusti	chi fussi	fussi
iddhu, iddha	esti	era	fu(i)	chi fussi	fussi
nu(i)	simu	èrumu	fummu	chi fùssimu	fùssimu
vu(i)	siti	eru	fustu	chi fustu	fùssivu
iddhi	sunnu	èrunu	furu	chi fùssiru	fùssiru

==== A(v)iri (to have) ====
	Present	Imperfect	Past simple	Subjunctive present	Subjunctive imperfect
(j)eu	aju	aiva	eppi	chi aissi	aissi
tu(ni)	ai	aivi	aisti	chi aissi	aissi
iddhu, iddha	avi	aiva	eppi	chi aissi	aissi
nui	aimu	aìvumu	èppimu	chi aìssimu	aìssimu
vui	aiti	aivu	aistu	chi aìssivu	aìssivu
iddhi	ànnu	aìvunu	èppiru	chi aìssiru	aìssiru

=== Dialects ===
- Reggino dialect ("u riggitanu" in Reggino or, previously, also "(l)u rijitanu"): the dialect with the most speakers, and cites Reggio Calabria as its cultural centre. This dialect is very similar to the dialect of Messina in Sicily.
- Dialects of the Chjana: spoken in the plains of Gioia Tauro (Piana di Gioia Tauro), a micro-region situated north of Aspromonte.
- Locride dialects: spoken on the east coast of the Province of Reggio Calabria.
- Catanzaro dialect used in the area of the Gulf of Squillace.

=== Comparison of the Central-Southern Calabrian Dialects ===
- Universal Declaration of Human Rights in English:

All human beings are born free and equal in dignity and rights. They are endowed with reason and conscience and should act towards one another in a spirit of brotherhood.

- In Italian:

Tutti gli esseri umani nascono liberi ed eguali in dignità e diritti. Essi sono dotati di ragione e di coscienza e devono agire gli uni verso gli altri in spirito di fratellanza.

Reggino	Piana di Gioia Tauro	Locride	Catanzaro	Alto Jonica
"Tutti i cristiani	"Tutti l'òmani	"Tutti i perzuni	"Tutti l'òmini	"Tutti l'uàmini
nàsciunu lìbberi	nàscinu lìbbèri	nèsciunu lìbberi	nèscianu lìbberi	nàscianu lìbberi
e ntâ stessa manera	e 'â stessa manera	e ntâ stessa manera	e sunnu	e su'
'i l'authri	di l'atri	di l'atti	i stessi	i stessi
pi dignità e diritti.	pe dignità e diritti.	pe dignità e diritti.	pe dignità e diritti.	pe dignità e diritti.
Iddhi ndannu	Tutti ndannu	Iji ndannu	Ognunu ava u cerveddhu	Ognunu tena u cerivìaddru
ognunu u so ciriveddhu	ognunu u so cervellu	ognunu u cerveju	soi e a raggiuna	sue e a raggiune sua
mi 'rraggiùnunu	pemmu reggiùnanu	soi pemmu raggiùnanu	e a cuscenza sua	e a cuscìanza sua
e ndannu mi càmpunu	e ndannu pemmu càmpanu	e ndannu u càmpanu	e ava ma si cumporta	e s'a' de comportare
unu cu l'authru	unu cu l'atru	unu cu l'attu	cu l'atri propriu	cu l'atri propriu
comu mi sunnu frati	comu frati figgji	comu frati figgji	comu si fhussèranu	cuamu si fòranu
râ stessa matri."	dâ stessa mamma."	dâ stessa matri."	i frati soi."	frati sui."

== Northern Calabrian (Cosentian) ==
Map showing the extensions of Cosentian dialects (Ve) and Lausberg area (Vd) within the Cosenza province of Calabria.

The Northern Calabrian (cusintinu or cosentino) dialects are largely found throughout the Province of Cosenza, and even if they could still be categorized together with Neapolitan varieties, they nonetheless are heavily transitional towards Sicilian ones.

=== Conjugations ===
==== Esse (to be) ====
	Present	Imperfect	Past simple	Subjunctive present	Subjunctive imperfect
iu	signu	era	signu statu	fossa	
tu(ni)	si'	eri	si' statu	fossi	
iddru, iddra	è	era	è statu	fossa	
nua	simu	èramu	simu stati	fòssimu	
vua	siti	èrati	siti stati	fòssati	
iddri(o loro)	su'	èranu	su' stati	fòssaru	

==== Avì (to have) ====
	Present	Imperfect	Past simple	Subjunctive present	Subjunctive imperfect
iu	aju	avìa	ê (aju) avutu	avissa	
tu(ni)	a'	avii	a' avutu	avissi	
iddru, iddra	a'	avìa	a' avutu	avissa	
nua	avimu	avìamu	amu avutu	avìssamu	
vua	aviti	avìati	avit' avutu or ât' avutu	avvìssati	
iddri	ànnu	avìanu	ànnu avutu	avìssaru	

== Comparison of Central-Southern and Northern Calabrian ==
- Universal Declaration of Human Rights in English:

All human beings are born free and equal in dignity and rights. They are endowed with reason and conscience and should act towards one another in a spirit of brotherhood.

- In Italian:

Tutti gli esseri umani nascono liberi ed eguali in dignità e diritti. Essi sono dotati di ragione e di coscienza e devono agire gli uni verso gli altri in spirito di fratellanza.

- In Reggino (Central-Southern Calabrian) and Cosentian (Northern Calabrian):

Reggino	Cosentian
"Tutti i cristiàni	"Tutti i ggìenti
nàsciunu libberi	nascianu libberi
e ntâ stessa manèra	e 'gguali
ill'authri	all'àtri
pi dignità e diritti.	ppì ddignità e diritti.
Iddhi ndànnu	Ognunu
ognunu u so ciriveddhu	tena cirbìeddru
mi 'rraggiùnunu	raggiune e cuscìenza
e 'ndannu mi càmpunu	e s'ha de cumbortà
unu cull'authru	cull'atri
comu mi sùnnu fràti	cumu si li fòssaru
râ stessa matri."	frati."

=== Bibliography ===
- Gerhard Rohlfs, Nuovo Dizionario Dialettale della Calabria, Longo, Ravenna, 1990;
- Gerhard Rohlfs, Dizionario dei Cognomi e Soprannomi in Calabria, Longo, Ravenna, 1979;
- Gerhard Rohlfs, Dizionario toponomastico ed Onomastico della Calabria, Longo, Ravenna, 1990;
- Giuseppe Pensabene, Cognomi e Toponimi in Calabria, Gangemi, Reggio Calabria, 1987;
- G. Amiotti – M. Vittoria Antico Gallina – L. Giardino, I Greci nel sud dell'Italia, Amilcare Pizzi, Milan, 1995;
- Domenico Caruso, Storia e Folklore Calabrese, Centro Studi S. Martino, 1988;

== Other languages in Calabria ==
- Grecanico, a variety of Italiot Greek spoken in Calabria. Native Italian Greek varieties are classified as the Grecanico of modern Greek.
- Gardiol, a variety of Occitan spoken in Guardia Piemontese.
- Arbëresh, a dialect of the Albanian language.

== Bibliography ==
Italian bibliography:

- Autori Vari, Storia e Civiltà dei Greci, Bompiani, IV edizione 2000;
- Autori Vari, Storia della Calabria, Gangemi, Reggio Calabria, 1988/1999.
- Luigi Accattatis, Vocabolario del dialetto calabrese: opera in 3 volumi, Casa del libro, 1963;
- Alessio, G. 1931-2, Rec. a G. Rohlfs, Etymologisches Wörterbuch der unteritalienischen Gräzität, «Archivio Storico per la Calabria e Lucania», I-II, 1-56; 261–273.
- Alessio, G. 1934. Il sostrato Latino nel lessico e nell'epotoponomastica dell'Italia meridionale, in «L’Italia Dialettale» X 1934, 111–190. Alessio, G. 1936. Note etimologiche, «L’Italia Dialettale» XII, 59–81.
- Alessio, G. 1936a, Ricerche etimologiche, «AGI» XXVIII, 151–171. Alessio, G. 1937. Ricerche etimologiche (continuazione), «AGI» XXIX, 120–137.
- Alessio, G. 1937–8. Deformazione ed etimologia popolare nei dialetti dell'Italia meridionale, «Rendiconti dell'Istituto Lombardo di Scienze e Lettere. Classe di Lettere e scienze morali e storiche» 71, 357–407.
- Alessio, G. 1938 sgg. Nuovo contributo al problema della grecità nell'Italia meridionale, «RIL» LXII, 109–137; 137–172; LXXIV, 1940–1, 631–706, LXXVII, 1943–44, 617–706; LXXIV, 1940–1, 631–706; LXXVII, 1943–4, 617–706; 137–172; LXXIX, 1945–46, 65–92.
- Alessio, G. 1939a. Gli imprestiti dal Latino nei relitti bizantini dei dialetti dell'Italia meridionale, in Atti del V Congr. int. di studi bizantini, I, Roma («Studi bizantini e neoellenici» V, 1939), 341–90.
- Alessio, G. 1940 sgg. Nuovi grecismi nei dialetti del Mezzogiorno d’Italia, «RFIC» 68, 256–263; 70, 1942, 47–53.
- Alessio, G. 1941. Due problemi etimologici italiani meridionali, «AR» 25, 201–206.
- Alessio G. 1942. Americanismi in Calabria, "Lingua Nostra" IV 1942, 41.
- Alessio, G. 1942 a. Ricerche etimologiche (continuazione), "AGI" XXXIV, 23–35.
- Alessio, G. 1942–3. L'elemento Latino e quello greco nei dialetti del Cilento, "RIL" LXXVI, 341–360.
- Alessio, G. 1942-3 a. Problemi di etimologia romanza, "RIL" LXXVI, 161-172 (Parte I); 173-187 (Parte II).
- Alessio, G. 1943–4. Nuove indagini sulla grecità dell'Italia meridionale, "RIL" 77, 27-106.
- Alessio, G. 1946–7. Sulla latinità della Sicilia, "Atti della Accademia di Scienze, Lettere e Arti di Palermo" S. IV, vol. VII (Parte seconda: Lettere), anno acc. 1946–7, Palermo, 287–510.
- Alessio, G. 1948. Sulla latinità della Sicilia, "Atti della Accademia di Scienze, Lettere e Arti di Palermo" S. IV, vol. VIII (1947-8), 1–309.
- Alessio, G. 1953. Calchi linguistici greco-latini nell'antico territorio della Magna Grecia, Atti dell'VIII Congresso intern. di studi bizantini (Palermo 3-10 aprile 1951), 237–299. Roma.
- Alessio, G. 1954. La stratificazione linguistica nel Bruzio, in Atti del I Congresso Storico Calabrese (Cosenza, 15-19 settembre 1954), Roma, 305–355.
- Alessio, G. 1954a, Concordanze lessicali tra i dialetti rumeni e quelli calabresi, "Annali della Fac. di Lett. e Fil. di Bari" I, 3-53.
- Alessio, G. 1956. La Calabria preistorica e storica alla luce dei suoi aspetti linguistici, Napoli, pp. 96.
- Alessio, G. 1958. Miscellanea di etimologie romanze, in Omagiu ... Iordan, 5-14.
- Alessio, G. 1959. Nuove etimologie latine e romanze, in Raccolta di studi linguistici in onore di G. D. Serra, Napoli, 53-104.
- G. Amiotti – M. Vittoria Antico Gallina – L. Giardino, I Greci nel sud dell'Italia (Collana: I popoli dell'Italia Antica), Amilcare Pizzi, Milan, 1995;
- P. A. Carè, Vocabolario dei Dialetti del Poro, Lambda, Nicotera (VV), 2000;
- Falcone, G. 1969. Indagini esplorative e delimitazioni areali nella Calabria reggina, «Bollettino della Carta dei Dialetti Italiani» 4, 1-9 + due cartine.
- Falcone, G. 1971. Ricerche fonetiche e socio-linguistiche in Calabria, «Studi Linguistici Salentini» 4, 7-19. Falcone, G. 1971a. Ricerche romaiche e romanze in Calabria, «Studi Linguistici Salentini» 4, 53–98.
- Falcone, G. 1971b. I risultati delle nuove ricerche romaiche in Calabria e la teoria parlangeliana. «Studi Linguistici Salentini», 5, 111–123;
- Falcone, G. 1973. Lingua e dialetto nella Calabria reggina, in Bilinguismo e diglossia in Italia (C.N.R. - Centro di studio per la dialettologia italiana, 1) Pisa, Pacini, 97-108.
- Falcone, G. 1974. Innovazione e conservazione nei dialetti calabresi, in Dal dialetto alla lingua. Atti del IX Convegno del C.S.D.I. (Lecce, 28 sett.-1 ott. 1972), Pisa, Pacini.
- Falcone, G. 1976. Calabria (CNR, Centro di Studio per la Dialettologia Italiana, 5. "Profilo dei dialetti italiani" a cura di M. Cortelazzo, 18), Pisa, Pacini.
- Falcone, G. 1976a. I riflessi antroponimici della Grecità bizantina e metabizantina nella Calabria reggina, in Italia nuova ed antica, vol. I, Galatina, Congedo ed., 301–318.
- Falcone, G. 1978–9. Extralinguismo e stratificazione del lessico calabrese, "Studi Linguistici Salentini" 10, 137–154.
- Falcone, G. 1979. Postille all'EWUG2 e all'NDDC, in Etimologia e lessico dialettale. Atti del XII Conv. per gli Studi Dialettali Italiani (Macerata, 10 13 aprile 1979), Pisa 1981, pp. 447–463.
- Falcone, G. 1979 a. Racconti popolari calabresi, Casa del libro, Reggio Calabria. Falcone, G. 1981. Postille all'EWUG2 e all'NDDC, in Etimologia e lessico dialettale. Atti del XII
- L. Galasso, Vocabolario Calabro-Italiano, Edizioni Proposte, Nicotera (VV), 1995.
- Gregorino cav. Capano, Vocabolario dialettale San Sostene-Davoli (CZ), edito dalla Sudgrafica di Davoli Marina (CZ), settembre 2007.
- Gregorino cav. Capano, Dizionario delle Cinque Calabrie + due, edito dalla Sudgrafica di Davoli Marina (CZ), novembre 2009.
- Martino, P. 1978. Calabrese `ndrànghita, greco andragathía, in Opuscula I, vol. 8 della «Biblioteca di ricerche linguistiche e filologiche» dell'Istituto di Glottologia dell'Università di Roma, pp. 37–55.
- Martino, P. 1980. L'isola grecanica dell'Aspromonte. Aspetti sociolinguistici, in «Atti dell'XI Congr. intern. SLI», vol.I, pp. 305–341, Roma, Bulzoni.
- Martino, P. 1988. Per la storia della 'ndrànghita, vol. 25,1 del Dipartimento di Studi glottoantropologici dell'Università di Roma "La Sapienza" (Opuscula III,1), Roma.
- Martino, P. 1990. 'Ndrànghita, in «Storia e Dossier» V, n. 41, giugno.
- Martino, P. 1990a. Due esiti di un grecismo bizantino in Calabria, in «L'Italia Dialettale. Rivista di dialettologia italiana», vol. LIII (Nuova Serie XXX).
- Martino, P. 1990b. Prefazione a G. Misitano, Vocabolario del dialetto di Sinopoli, Vibo Valentia, Qualecultura -Jaca Book, pp. 6–8. *Martino, P. 1991. L'"area Lausberg". Isolamento e arcaicità, vol. 31 della «Biblioteca di ricerche linguistiche e filologiche» del Dipartimento di Studi glottoantropologici dell'Università di Roma "La Sapienza", Roma, pp. 144 + 8 tavv.
- Martino, P. 1993. Riflessi lessicali di una concezione precristiana della morte, in Ethnos, lingua e cultura. Scritti in memoria di G. R. Cardona, 143–154. Roma, Il Calamo. Martino, P. 1994. Siciliano e calabrese (ac)cattïari ‘spiare, sbirciare’, in Miscellanea di studi linguistici in onore di Walter Belardi, vol. II, pp. 629–665, Roma, Il Calamo.
- Martino, P. 1997. Vicende di americanismi nei dialetti, in «Lingua Nostra» LVIII, fasc. 3–4, 109–110.
- Martino, P. 1999. Questioni di lessicologia calabrese: i conflitti omonimici, Atti del Convegno di Studi sul tema I dialetti dell'Italia centro-meridionale con particolare riferimento a quelli della Calabria (Cassano Jonio 25-27 ott. 1996), in «Linguistica Italiana Meridionale», IV-V, 1996–97, Bari, Laterza.
- Martino, P. 2001. Il lessico della Divina Commedia di G. Blasi. Nota linguistica, in La Divina Commedia di Dante Alighieri tradotta nel dialetto calabrese di Laureana (R.C.), a cura di Umberto Distilo, Cosenza, Pellegrini Ed., 627–782.
- Martino, P. 2002. Il dialetto di Melicuccà, in Melicuccà e i suoi poeti, a c. di V. Borgia, Villa S. Giovanni, Ed. Officina Grafica, 29–46.
- Martino, P. 2004. Sulla traduzione, Postfazione al Cantico dei cantici, Traduzione in dialetto calabrese di S. Augruso, Vibo Valentia, Qualecultura.
- Martino, P. 2008. Calabro-grecismi non bovesi, in I dialetti meridionali tra arcaismo e interferenza. Atti del Convegno Internazionale di Dialettologia (Messina, 4-6 giugno 2008), a cura di Alessandro De Angelis. Palermo, Centro di Studi Filologici e Linguistici Siciliani, pp. 63–84.
- Martino, P. 2008a. L'affaire Bovesìa. Un singolare irredentismo, in Alloglossie e comunità alloglotte nell'Italia contemporanea, Atti del XLI Congresso Internazionale di Studi della Società di Linguistica Italiana (Pescara), in stampa.
- Martino, P. 1978. Calabrese `ndrànghita, greco andragathía, in Opuscula I, vol. 8 della "Biblioteca di ricerche linguistiche e filologiche" dell'Istituto di Glottologia dell'Università di Roma, pp. 37–55.
- Giuseppe Antonio Martino, Dizionario dei dialetti della Calabria Meridionale, Qualecultura, Vibo Valentia 2010.
- Martino, P. 1980. L'isola grecanica dell'Aspromonte. Aspetti sociolinguistici, in «Atti dell'XI Congr. intern. SLI», vol.I, pp. 305–341, Roma, Bulzoni.
- Martino, P. 1988. Per la storia della 'ndrànghita, vol. 25,1 del Dipartimento di Studi glottoantropologici dell'Università di Roma "La Sapienza" (Opuscula III,1), Roma.
- Martino, P. 1990. 'Ndrànghita, in «Storia e Dossier» V, n. 41, giugno. Martino, P. 1990a. Due esiti di un grecismo bizantino in Calabria, in «L'Italia Dialettale. Rivista di dialettologia italiana», vol. LIII (Nuova Serie XXX).
- Martino, P. 1990b. Prefazione a G. Misitano, Vocabolario del dialetto di Sinopoli, Vibo Valentia, Qualecultura -Jaca Book, pp. 6–8. *Martino, P. 1991. L'"area Lausberg". Isolamento e arcaicità, vol. 31 della «Biblioteca di ricerche linguistiche e filologiche» del Dipartimento di Studi glottoantropologici dell'Università di Roma "La Sapienza", Roma, pp. 144 + 8 tavv.
- Martino, P. 1993. Riflessi lessicali di una concezione precristiana della morte, in Ethnos, lingua e cultura. Scritti in memoria di G. R. Cardona, 143–154. Roma, Il Calamo.
- Martino, P. 1994. Siciliano e calabrese (ac)cattïari ‘spiare, sbirciare’, in Miscellanea di studi linguistici in onore di Walter Belardi, vol. II, pp. 629–665, Roma, Il Calamo.
- Martino, P. 1997. Vicende di americanismi nei dialetti, in «Lingua Nostra» LVIII, fasc. 3–4, 109–110.
- Martino, P. 1999. Questioni di lessicologia calabrese: i conflitti omonimici, Atti del Convegno di Studi sul tema I dialetti dell'Italia centro-meridionale con particolare riferimento a quelli della Calabria (Cassano Jonio 25-27 ott. 1996), in «Linguistica Italiana Meridionale», IV-V, 1996–97, Bari, Laterza.
- Martino, P. 2001. Il lessico della Divina Commedia di G. Blasi. Nota linguistica, in La Divina Commedia di Dante Alighieri tradotta nel dialetto calabrese di Laureana (R.C.), a cura di Umberto Distilo, Cosenza, Pellegrini Ed., 627–782.
- Martino, P. 2002. Il dialetto di Melicuccà, in Melicuccà e i suoi poeti, a c. di V. Borgia, Villa S. Giovanni, Ed. Officina Grafica, 29–46. Martino, P. 2004. Sulla traduzione, Postfazione al Cantico dei cantici, Traduzione in dialetto calabrese di S. Augruso, Vibo Valentia, Qualecultura.
- Martino, P. 2008. Calabro-grecismi non bovesi, in I dialetti meridionali tra arcaismo e interferenza. Atti del Convegno Internazionale di Dialettologia (Messina, 4-6 giugno 2008), a cura di Alessandro De Angelis. Palermo, Centro di Studi Filologici e Linguistici Siciliani, pp. 63–84.
- Martino, P. 2008a. L'affaire Bovesìa. Un singolare irredentismo, in Alloglossie e comunità alloglotte nell'Italia contemporanea, Atti del XLI Congresso Internazionale di Studi della Società di Linguistica Italiana (Pescara), in stampa. Rohlfs, G. 1919–20. Span. judìa, kalabr. suraka 'Bohne', in "ZRPh" 40, p. 340.
- F. Mosino, Dal Greco antico al Greco moderno in Calabria e Basilicata, G. Pontari, Reggio Calabria, 1995;
- Giuseppe Pensabene, Cognomi e Toponimi in Calabria, Gangemi, Reggio Calabria, 1987;
- Rohlfs, G. 1922. Lat. ut 'wie' im heutigen Kalabrien, "ZRPh" 42, 210–211. Rohlfs, G. 1922 a, Apul. ku, kalabr. mu und der Verlust des Infinitivs in Unteritalien, "ZRPh" 42, 211–233.
- Davide Roccamo, Welcome To Calabrifornia, Edizioni Lulu, Rende (Cs), 2012;
- Rohlfs, G. 1923. Zum Worte nasida, "Byzantinische-neugriechische Jahrbücher", 4, 17. Rohlfs, G. 1925 . Der Stand der Mundartenforschung in Unteritalien (bis zum Jahre 1923), in RLiR I, 278 323. Rohlfs, G. 1925 a. Dorische Sprachtrümmer in Unteritalien, "Byzantinische-neugriechische Jahrbücher", 4, 1–4.
- Rohlfs, G. 1926. Romani e Romaici nell'Italia meridionale, "AGI", XX, 72–96. Rohlfs, G. 1928. Autochtone Griechen oder byzantinische Gräzität?, "Revue de Linguistique Romane", IV, n. 13–14, 118-200
- Rohlfs, G. 1928a. La Grecía italica, "Anthropos", 23, 1021–1028. Rohlfs, G. 1930. Etymologisches Wörterbuch der unteritalienischen Gräzität (= EWUG), Halle; poi: Lexicon Graecanicum Italiae Inferioris (LGII), Tübingen 19642, pp. XXX-629.
- Rohlfs, G. 1932. La Grecità in Calabria, "Archivio Storico di Calabria e Lucania" II, 405–425.
- Rohlfs, G. 1934. A proposito di Vitreto, (Vitaritu), in "Archivio Storico di Calabria e Lucania" IV, 75–76. Rohlfs, G. 1958. La perdita dell'infinito nelle lingue balcaniche e nell'Italia meridionale, in Omagiu lui Jorgu Jordan, București: Editura Academei R. P. R., 733–744; poi in Rohlfs 1972, 318–332.
- Rohlfs, G. 1961. Su alcuni calchi sintattici dal greco nell'Italia meridionale, "Studi Linguistici Italiani", 2, 141-154 [Sull'uso del periodo ipotetico a Cardeto, Mélito, Ferruzzano, Platì e dintorni di Oppido e Palmi, ecc.]
- Rohlfs, G. 1964. Lexicon Graecanicum Italiae Inferioris. Etymologisches Wörterbuch der unteritalienischen Gräzität, 2., erweiterte und völlig neubearbeitete Auflage, Tübingen.
- Rohlfs, G. 1965. La congiunzione mi (in sostituzione dell'infinito) in Sicilia, in Omagiu Alexandru Rosetti, Bucarest 1965, 775–778; poi in Rohlfs 1972, 1990, 333–338.
- Rohlfs, G. 1966, 1968, 1969. Grammatica storica della lingua italiana e dei suoi dialetti, 1. Fonetica, 2. Morfologia, 3. Sintassi e formazione delle parole, Torino (ed. it. di Historische Grammatik der italienischen Sprache und ihres Mundarten, Bern 1949).
- Rohlfs, G. 1969, Fra Sila e Aspromonte. Calabria dialettale, in Mélanges de philologie offerts à Alf Lombard (Etudes Romanes de Lund, XVIII), 178–190. Lund.
- Rohlfs, G. 1969a. Die Flussnamen im heutigen Kalabrien, "BNF" 4, Heft 2, 114–142. Rohlfs, G. 1972. Studi e ricerche su lingua e dialetti d'Italia, Firenze, Sansoni; rist. con pref. di F. Fanciullo, Firenze, Sansoni, 1990.
- Rohlfs, G. 1972a. Nuovi scavi linguistici nell'antica Magna Grecia, Palermo, Ist. di studi biz. e neoellenici, 1972; trad. it. di *Rohlfs 1962. [Rec. di M.G. Tibiletti Bruno in "Lingua e stile" X,1,1975, 134-7].
- Rohlfs, G. 1974. Dizionario toponomastico e onomastico della Calabria. Prontuario filologico-geografico della Calabria, Ravenna, Longo [Rec. di M. Doria "Incontri Linguistici" 3/2, 1976–7, 199-209].
- Rohlfs, G. 1977. Nuovo Dizionario Dialettale della Calabria (con repertorio calabro italiano). Nuova edizione interamente rielaborata, ampliata ed aggiornata. Ravenna, Longo.
- Rohlfs, G. 1977a. Grammatica storica dei dialetti italogreci (Calabria, Salento), München, Beck [Trad. ital. di Rohlfs 1950 a]. *Rohlfs, G. 1978. Calabria dialettale tra Monte Pollino e Aspromonte (Calabria Latina e Calabria grecanica), in «Forum Italicum» (Buffalo, N.Y.) 12, 3-10.
- Rohlfs, G. 1979. Dizionario dei cognomi e dei soprannomi in Calabria. Ravenna, Longo. Rohlfs, G. 1980. Calabria e Salento. Saggi di storia linguistica. Ravenna, Longo.
- Rohlfs, G. 1980a. Tipi del periodo ipotetico (condizionale) nell'estremo mezzogiorno d'Italia, in Stimmen der Romania. Festschrift Wilhelm Theodor Elwert zum 70. Geburtstag, a c. di G. Schmidt e M. Tietz, Wiesbaden, Heymann, 625–631.
- Rohlfs, G. 1982. Ein archaischer phonetischer Latinismus in nördlichen ('lateinischer') Kalabrien, in "ZRPh" 98, 547–549; poi (in trad. it.: Un arcaismo fonetico di antica latinità nel Bruzio) in Latinità ed ellenismo nel Mezzogiorno d'Italia. Studi e ricerche dalla Magna Grecia alla Grecia italiana, Framasud, Chiaravalle Centrale (Catanzaro) 1985, pp. 73 77.
- Rohlfs, G. 1984. Dizionario storico dei cognomi della Sicilia orientale (Centro di Studi Filologici e Linguistici Siciliani), Palermo. Rohlfs, G. 1984a. La Sicilia nei secoli, Palermo, Sellerio; rielaborazione di Historische Sprachschichten im modernen Sizilien, (1975).
- Gerhard Rohlfs, Nuovo Dizionario Dialettale della Calabria, Longo, Ravenna, 1990;
- Gerhard Rohlfs, Dizionario toponomastico ed Onomastico della Calabria, Longo, Ravenna, 1990;
- F. Violi, Lessici antropo-toponimici di Bova e Palizzi, UTE-TEL-B, Bova Marina, 2004.

== See also ==
- List of Languages of Italy
- Sicilian language
- Calabria
- Magna Graecia
- Theme of Sicily
