= Zungri =

Town in Calabria, Italy

Zungri Tsougkri (Greek)
- Comune
- Comune di Zungri
- Location within Italy Location within Calabria
- Coordinates: 38°39′20″N 15°59′00″E
- Country: Italy
- Region: Calabria
- Province: Vibo Valentia (VV)
- Frazioni: Papaglionti

Government
  - Mayor: Francesco Galati

Area
  - Total: 23.3 km^{2} (9.0 sq mi)
- Elevation: 554 m (1,818 ft)

Population (2007)
  - Total: 2,095
  - Density: 89.9/km^{2} (233/sq mi)
- Demonym: Zungresi
- Time zone: UTC+1 (CET)
  - Summer (DST): UTC+2 (CEST)
- Postal code: 89867
- Dialing code: 0963
- Patron saint: Madonna della Neve
- Saint day: 5 August
- Website: Official website

Zungri (Calabrian: Zzungàri) is a comune and town in Calabria, in southern Italy, in the province of Vibo Valentia.

Zungri just south-west of the town of Vibo Valentia
