= Frittola =

Frittola may refer to:

- Frittola (meat dish), a Sicilian street food made of calf
- Frittola (sweet), a sweet originating in the northern Adriatic

== See also ==
- Frittole (disambiguation)
