= Frittole =

Frittole may refer to:

- Frittole (meat dish), a Calabrian pork parts dish
- Frittole (doughnut), a sweet originating in the northern Adriatic

== See also ==
- Frittola (disambiguation)
