= Dino, Calabria =

Island in the Tyrrhenian Sea

Dino
Native name: Isola di Dino
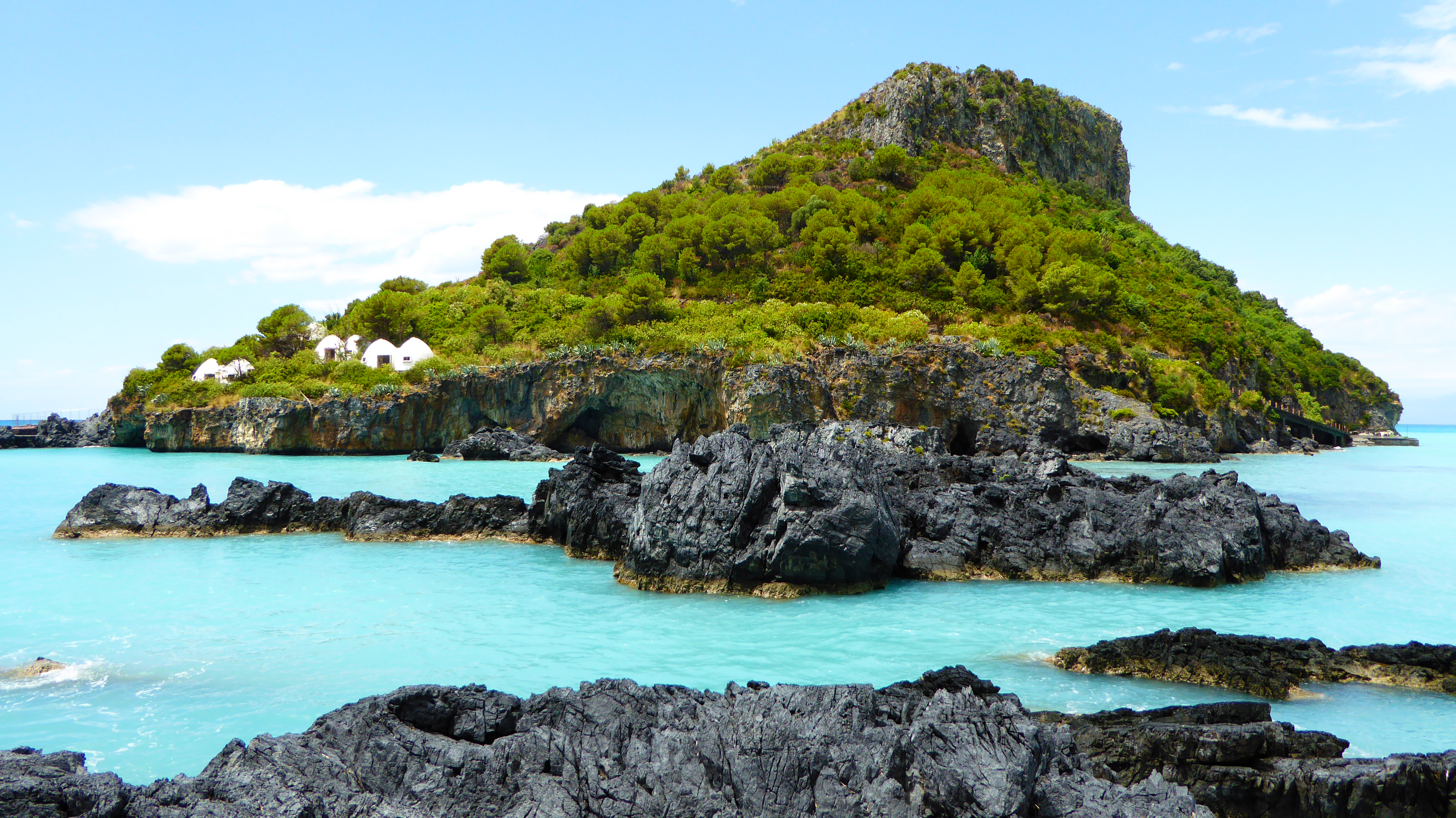
- Isola di Dino

- Location within Italy

Geography
- Location: Tyrrhenian Sea
- Coordinates: 39°52′26″N 15°46′30″E

Administration
- Italy
- Region: Calabria
- Province: Cosenza
- Commune: Praia a Mare

Dino is the larger of the two small islands in the Tyrrhenian Sea, off the coast of Calabria. The island is situated off Cape Arena, near to Praia a Mare. The name of the island either derives from Italian aedina, a temple, or Greek dino, a vortex or storm.

== Geography ==
The island covers an area of 50 hectares (120 acres) and has a maximum altitude of 100 metres (330 ft). The north of the island is dominated by steep limestone cliffs over 80 metres (260 ft) high. Water erosion has given rise to many caves, including Monaco, Sardine, Cascate and Leone. The largest cave is Grotta Azzura (the Blue Grotto), while Grotta Gargiulo is almost completely submerged and reaches to 18 metres (59 ft) below sea level.

== History ==
The island was frequented by Muslim vessels in the course of their military expeditions to Italy in the ninth, tenth and eleventh centuries. In the summer of 1600, the shoreline was stormed by the Turks, led by Amurat Rays. Citizens from Aieta on the island, led by Francesco Vitigno, resisted the attack until they were all captured and killed. In 1806 the island became the base of operations of the English fleet under Admiral Sidney Smith, who tried to oppose the penetration of Napoleon's army in Calabria.

Joachim Murat eliminated feudalism on the island in 1812. The island was handed over from the Marquis of Aieta to the City of Aieta. Later the island passed to the Bourbons.

On 25 December 1917, off the coast of the island, the submarine UB-49 commanded by Hans von Mellenthin of the Austro-Hungarian Navy sank the British steamer Umballa carrying barley. The ship, launched in 1898 and owned by the British India Steam Navigation Company Ltd, had sailed from Karachi, had stopped in Syracuse, and was heading for Naples. The ship's bell was donated to the church of the Madonna della Grotta and renamed Santa Maria della Vittoria.

In 1928 the island became the autonomous property of the municipality of Praia a Mare. In 1956 the island was given a concession for 99 years and in 1962 was sold for 50 million lira to Gianni Agnelli with the aim of developing the island for elite international tourists. Development included the construction of a new 1,700 metres (1,900 yd) road from the wharf inland, new housing and other facilities. On 13 June 2014, a court annulled the contract.

== Fauna and flora ==
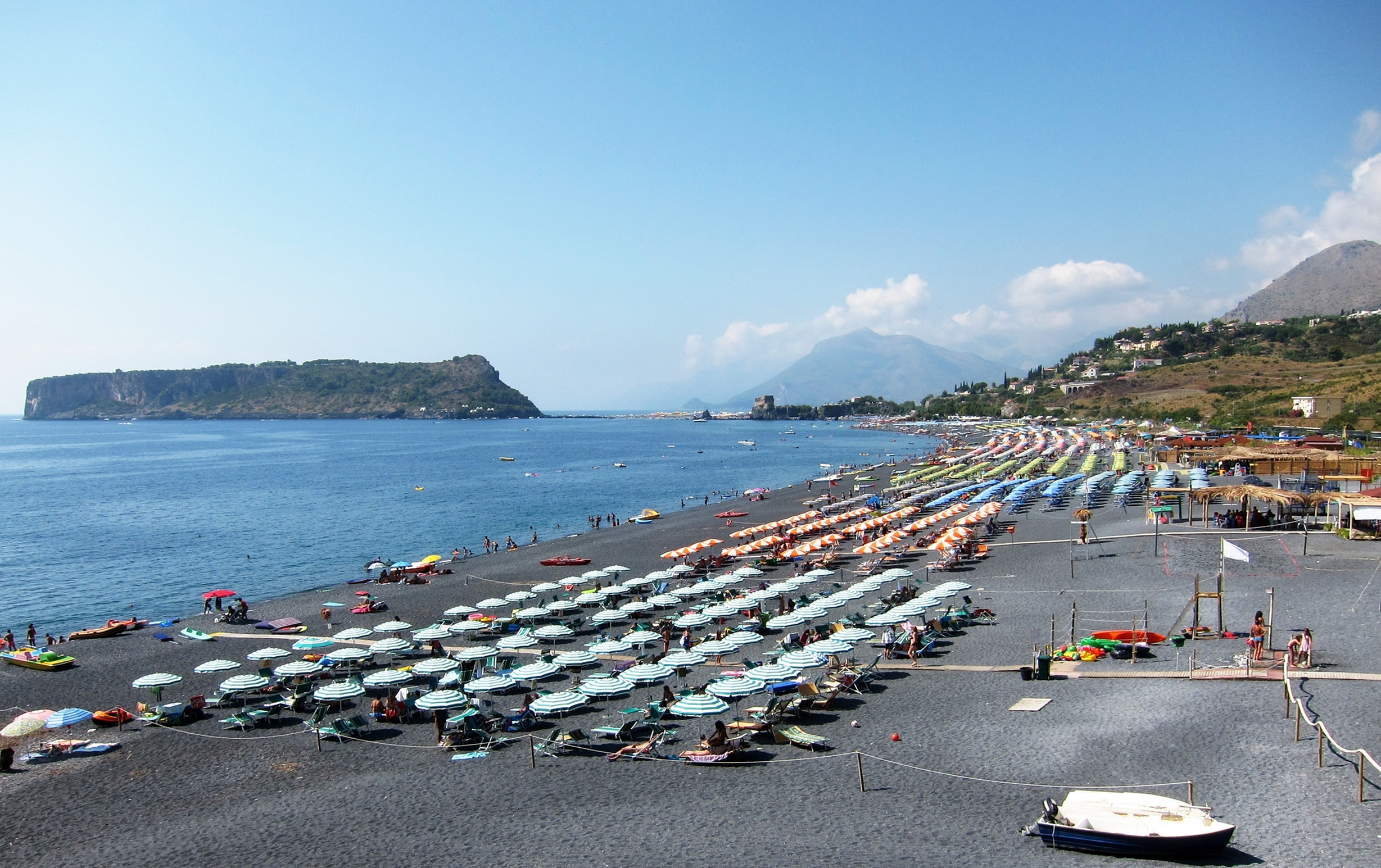
Dino

Vegetation is Mediterranean, with some rare plants in the inaccessible cliffs to the north and northwest such as the Mediterranean dwarf palm (Chamaerops humilis), the rock carnation (Dianthus rupicola), and the endemic palinuro primula (Primula palinuri) found in colonies on limestone facing north and northeast. Dino has a larger population of the primula than the rest of the Tyrrhenian coast, probably because the areas of its flourishing on Dino are accessible with difficulty and therefore have been little disturbed by humans. On Dino, groups of primula are seen that have abandoned their normal cave habitats and have pushed between the herbaceous vegetation, even finding niches under oak trees. Individuals and small groups of the plant are also seen on the beach and clinging to the rock faces of cliffs on the mainland opposite the island. The primula palinuri is included in the IUCN list of endangered species. Due to the presence of primula, and other endemic species, the island was designated a Site of Community Interest (SCI) in 2011. A nature reserve is being established on the island.

Dino fauna includes many species of migratory birds, gulls which nest on steep cliffs and some birds of prey. There are also small rodents and several species of reptiles. Much more varied is the underwater ecosystem. The rare Scyllarides latus can be found in Grotta Gargiulo and the seas around the island are home to Chromis chromis, moray, octopus and, between 20–30 metres (66–98 ft) deep, among the Paramuricea clavata over 1 metre (3 ft 3 in) in height, grouper and amberjack.
