= Calabria =

Region of Italy

- Region
- Flag Coat of arms

- Location of Calabria in Italy
- Coordinates: 39.0°N 16.5°E
- Country: Italy
- Capital: Catanzaro
- Largest city: Reggio Calabria

Government
  - Type: Presidential system
  - President: Roberto Occhiuto (FI)

Area
  - Total: 15,221.90 km^{2} (5,877.21 sq mi)

Population (2026)
  - Total: 1,827,571
  - Density: 120.0620/km^{2} (310.9590/sq mi)
- Demonym(s): English: Calabrian; Italian: Calabrese

GDP
  - Total: €40.003 billion (2024)
  - Per capita: €21,812 (2024)
- Time zone: UTC+1 (CET)
  - Summer (DST): UTC+2 (CEST)
- ISO 3166 code: IT-78
- HDI (2021): 0.848 very high · 20th of 21
- NUTS Region: ITF
- Website: www.regione.calabria.it

Calabria (Note: English: UK: /kəˈlæbriə/ kə-LAB-ree-ə, US: /-ˈleɪb-, -ˈlɑːb-/ -LAYB-, -LAHB-; Italian: [kaˈlaːbrja]; Northern Calabrian: Calàbbria; Central-Southern Calabrian: Calàvria; Arbëreshë Albanian: Kalavrì; Calabrian Greek: Καλαβρία, romanized: Kalavría; Occitan: Calàbria) is a region in Southern Italy. It is a peninsula bordered by the Basilicata region to the north, the Ionian Sea to the east, the Strait of Messina to the southwest, which separates it from Sicily, and the Tyrrhenian Sea to the west. It has a population of 1,827,571 across a total area of 15,221.90 km^{2} (5,877.21 sq mi). Catanzaro is the region's capital.

Calabria is the birthplace of the name of Italy, given to it by the Ancient Greeks who settled in this land starting from the 8th century BCE. They established the first cities, mainly on the coast, as Greek colonies. During this period Calabria was the heart of Magna Graecia, home of key figures in history such as Pythagoras, Herodotus and Milo.

In Roman times, it was part of the Regio III Lucania et Bruttii, a region of Augustan Italy. After the Gothic War, it became and remained for five centuries a Byzantine dominion, fully recovering its Greek character. Cenobitism flourished, with the rise throughout the peninsula of numerous churches, hermitages and monasteries in which Basilian monks were dedicated to transcription. The Byzantines introduced the art of silk in Calabria and made it the main silk production area in Europe. In the 11th century, the Norman conquest started a slow process of Latinization.

Calabria has three historical ethnolinguistic minorities: the Grecanici, speaking Calabrian Greek; the Arbëreshë people, speaking Albanian language; and the Occitans of Guardia Piemontese. This linguistic diversity makes the region an object of study for linguists from all over the world.

Calabria is famous for its crystal clear sea waters and is dotted with ancient villages, castles and archaeological parks. Three national parks are found in the region: the Pollino National Park (which is the largest in Italy), the Sila National Park and the Aspromonte National Park.

== Etymology ==
Starting in the third century BCE, the name Calabria was originally given to the Adriatic coast of the Salento peninsula in modern Apulia. In the late first century BCE, this name came to extend to the entirety of the Salento, when the Roman emperor Augustus divided Italy into regions. The whole region of Apulia received the name Regio II Apulia et Calabria. During this time modern Calabria was still known as Bruttium, after the Bruttians who inhabited the region.

The Byzantine Empire, in the seventh century AD, created the Duchy of Calabria from the Salento and the Ionian part of Bruttium. Even though the Calabrian part of the duchy was conquered by the Lombards during the eighth and ninth centuries AD, the Byzantines continued to use the name Calabria for their remaining territory in Bruttium.

Originally the Greeks used Italoi to indicate the native population of modern Calabria, which according to some ancient Greek writers was derived from a legendary king of the Oenotri, Italus.

Over time, the Greeks started to use Italoi for the rest of the southern Italian peninsula as well. After the Roman conquest of the region, the name was used for the entire Italian peninsula and eventually the Alpine region too.

== History ==
The history of Calabria has one of the oldest records of human presence in Italy, beginning around 700,000 BCE when a type of Homo erectus left traces around coastal areas. During the Paleolithic period Stone Age humans created the "Bos Primigenius", a figure of a bull on a cliff created around 10,000 BCE in the Romito Cave in the town of Papasidero. When the Neolithic period came the first villages were founded, around 3,500 BCE. Calabria was at one time the center of the European silk industry.

== Geography ==
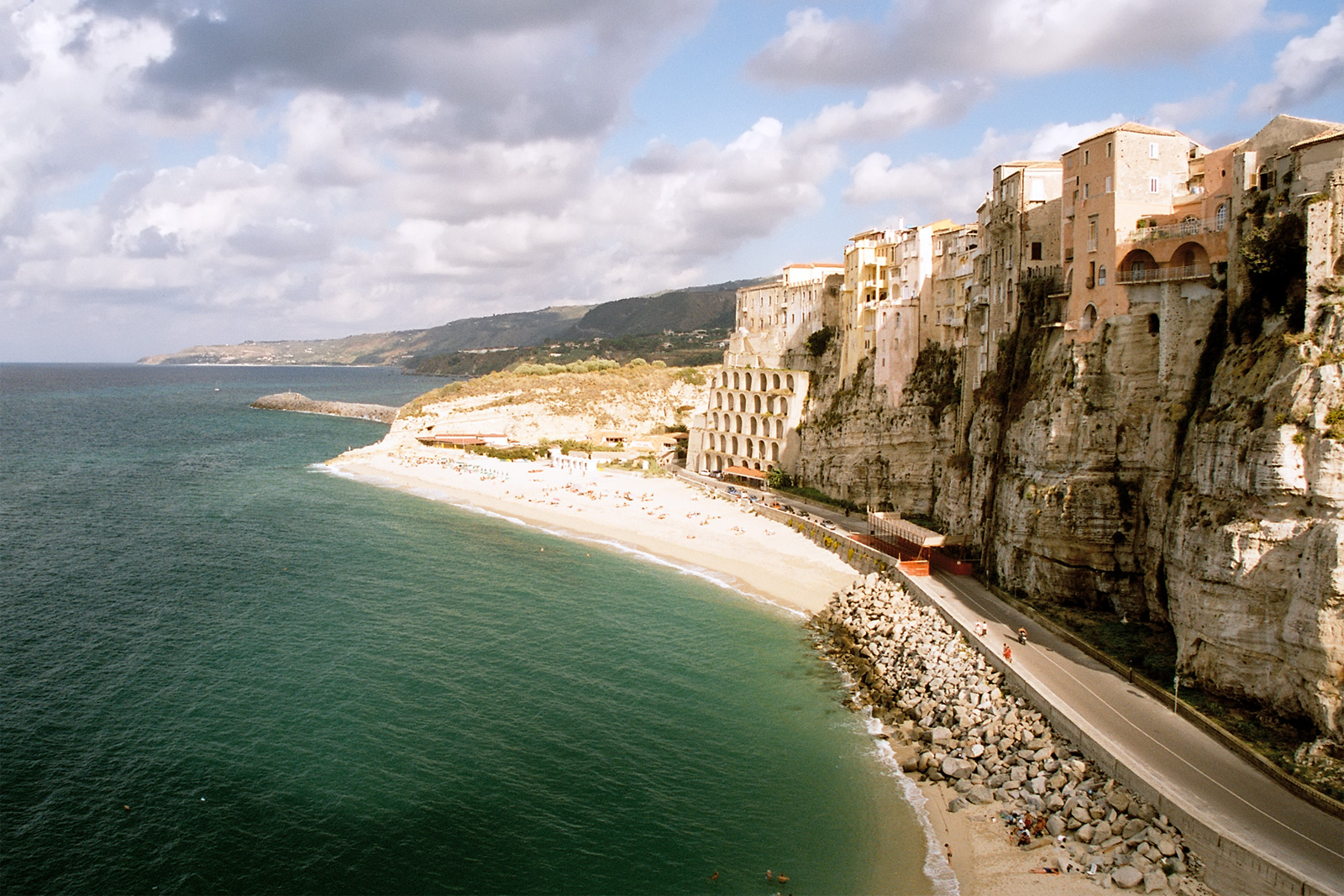
Cliff at Tropea

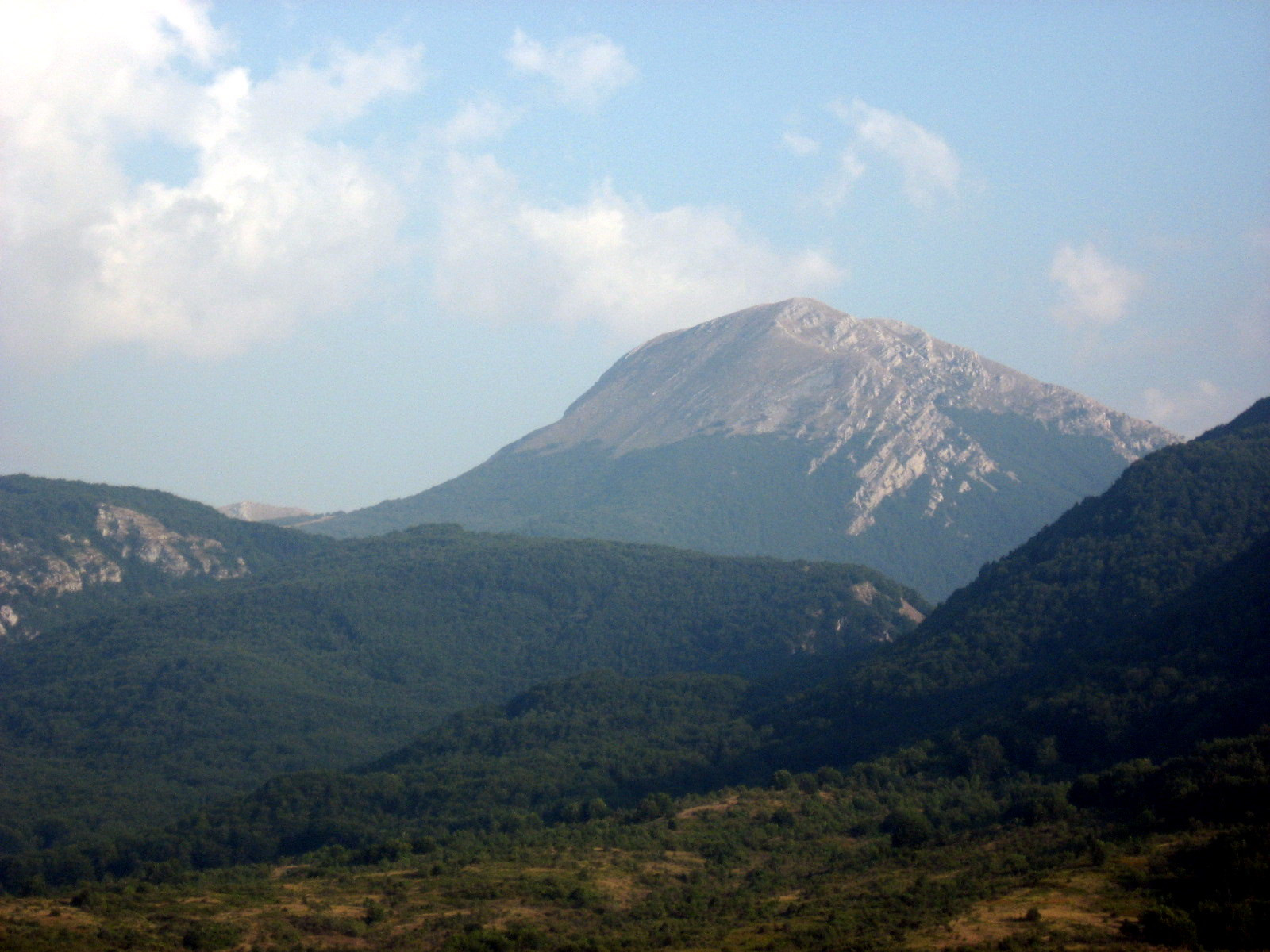
Pollino National Park

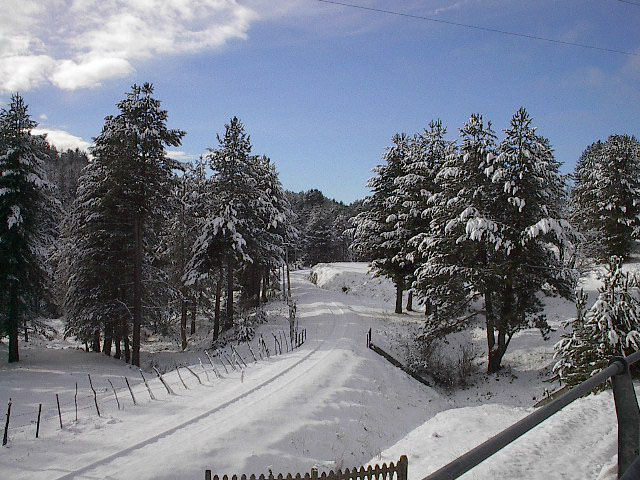
La Sila National Park

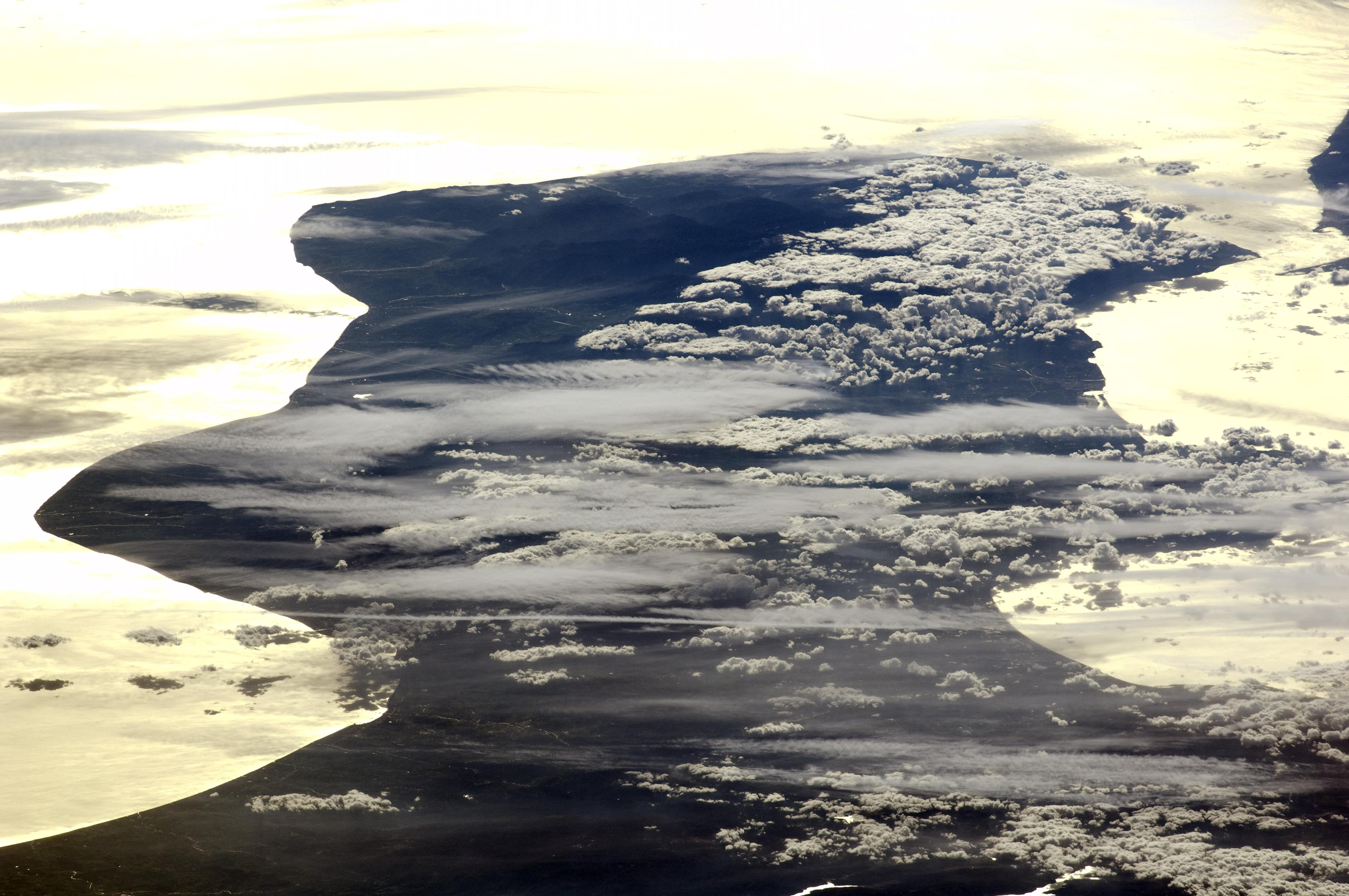
Calabria in a photo from the ISS

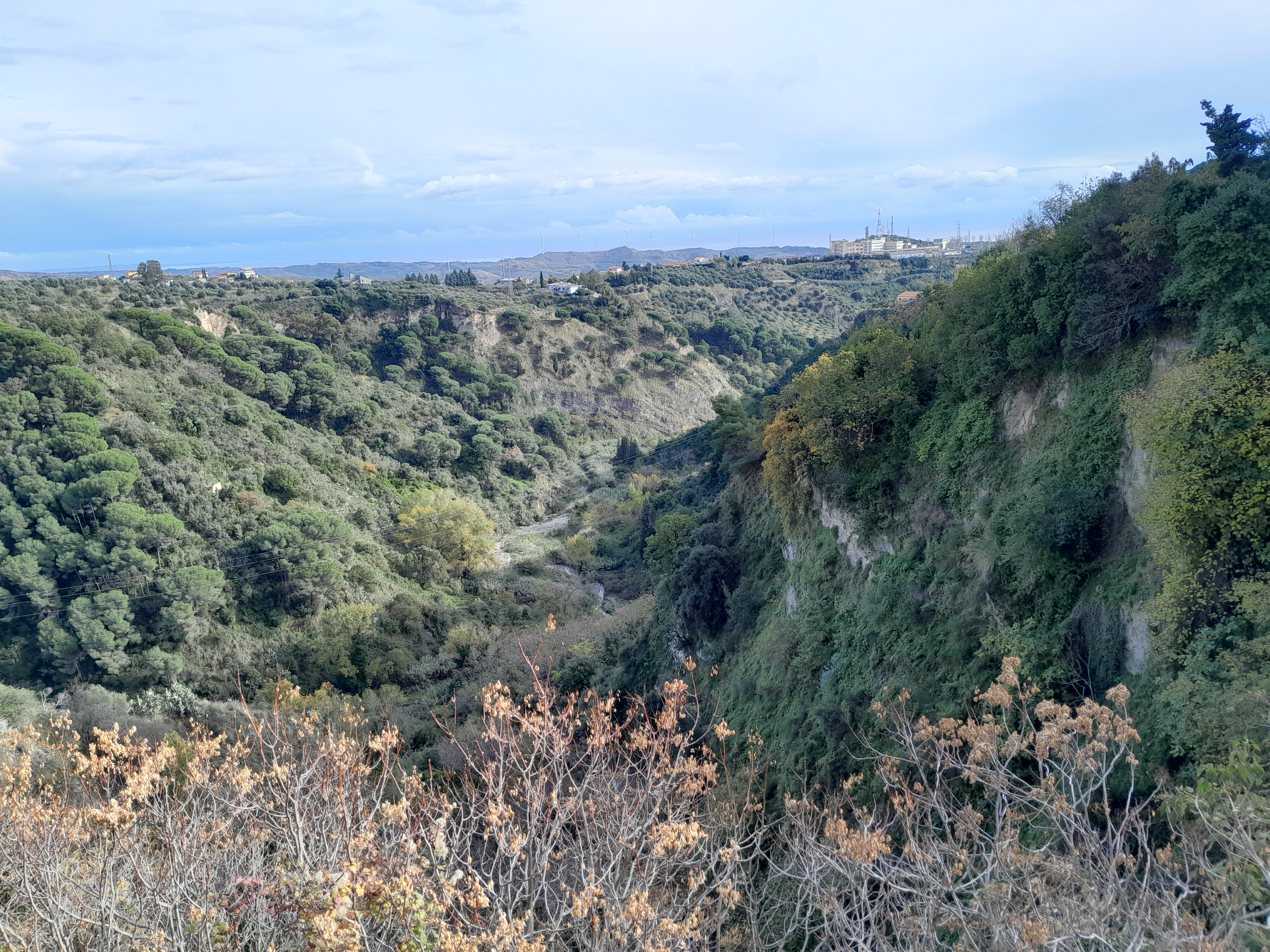
Landscape near Catanzaro

Calabria, in southern Italy, forms the "toe" of the Italian Peninsula. It is a long, narrow region that stretches about 248 kilometres (154 mi) from north to south and reaches a maximum width of 110 kilometres (68 mi). Much of the region is mountainous or hilly: about 42% of Calabria, or 15,080 square kilometres (5,820 sq mi), is mountainous, while 49% consists of hills. Plains make up only 9% of the region.

Calabria is bordered by the Ionian Sea to the east and the Tyrrhenian Sea to the west. It is separated from Sicily by the Strait of Messina. At its narrowest point, between Capo Peloro in Sicily and Punta Pezzo in Calabria, the strait is only 3.2 kilometres (2.0 mi) wide.

Three mountain ranges are present: Pollino, La Sila, and Aspromonte, each with its own flora and fauna. The Pollino Mountains in the north of the region are rugged and form a natural barrier separating Calabria from the rest of Italy. Parts of the area are heavily wooded, while others are vast, wind-swept plateaus with little vegetation. These mountains are home to a rare Bosnian Pine variety and are included in the Pollino National Park, which is the largest national park in Italy, covering 1,925.65 square kilometres (743.50 sq mi)

La Sila, which has been referred to as the "Great Wood of Italy", is a vast mountainous plateau about 1,200 m (3,900 ft) above sea level and stretches for nearly 2,000 km^{2} (770 sq mi) along the central part of Calabria. The highest point is Botte Donato, which reaches 1,928 m (6,325 ft). The area boasts numerous lakes and dense coniferous forests. La Sila also has some of the tallest trees in Italy which are called the "Giants of the Sila" and can reach up to 40 m (130 ft) in height. The Sila National Park is also known to have the purest air in Europe.

The Aspromonte massif forms the southernmost tip of the Italian peninsula bordered by the sea on three sides. This mountainous structure reaches its highest point at Montalto, at 1,995 m (6,545 ft), and is full of wide, man-made terraces that slope down toward the sea.

Most of the lower terrain in Calabria has been agricultural for centuries, and exhibits indigenous scrubland as well as introduced plants such as the prickly pear cactus. The lowest slopes are rich in vineyards and orchards of citrus fruit, including the Diamante citron. Further up, olives and chestnut trees appear while in the higher regions there are often dense forests of oak, pine, beech and fir trees.

=== Climate ===
Calabria's climate is influenced by the sea and mountains. The Mediterranean climate is typical of the coastal areas with considerable differences in temperature and rainfall between the seasons, with an average low of 8 °C (46 °F) during the winter months and an average high of 30 °C (86 °F) during the summer months. Mountain areas have a typical mountainous climate with frequent snow during winter. The erratic behavior of the Tyrrhenian Sea can bring heavy rainfall on the western slopes of the region, while hot air from Africa makes the east coast of Calabria dry and warm. The mountains that run along the region also influence the climate and temperature of the region. The east coast is much warmer and has wider temperature ranges than the west coast. The geography of the region causes more rain to fall along the west coast than that of the east coast, which occurs mainly during winter and autumn and less during the summer months.

Below are the two extremes of climate in Calabria, the warm mediterranean subtype on the coastline and the highland climate of Monte Scuro.

Climate data for Reggio Calabria (1971–2000 normals)
Month	Jan	Feb	Mar	Apr	May	Jun	Jul	Aug	Sep	Oct	Nov	Dec	Year
Record high °C (°F)	24.6 (76.3)	25.2 (77.4)	27.0 (80.6)	30.4 (86.7)	35.2 (95.4)	42.0 (107.6)	44.2 (111.6)	42.4 (108.3)	37.6 (99.7)	34.4 (93.9)	29.9 (85.8)	26.0 (78.8)	44.2 (111.6)
Mean daily maximum °C (°F)	15.3 (59.5)	15.6 (60.1)	17.1 (62.8)	19.3 (66.7)	23.8 (74.8)	27.9 (82.2)	31.1 (88.0)	31.3 (88.3)	28.2 (82.8)	23.9 (75.0)	19.7 (67.5)	16.6 (61.9)	22.5 (72.5)
Daily mean °C (°F)	11.8 (53.2)	11.8 (53.2)	13.0 (55.4)	15.1 (59.2)	19.2 (66.6)	23.2 (73.8)	26.4 (79.5)	26.7 (80.1)	23.7 (74.7)	19.8 (67.6)	15.9 (60.6)	13.1 (55.6)	18.3 (65.0)
Mean daily minimum °C (°F)	8.2 (46.8)	7.9 (46.2)	9.0 (48.2)	10.9 (51.6)	14.7 (58.5)	18.6 (65.5)	21.6 (70.9)	22.1 (71.8)	19.3 (66.7)	15.7 (60.3)	12.1 (53.8)	9.6 (49.3)	14.1 (57.5)
Record low °C (°F)	1.0 (33.8)	-0.0 (32.0)	0.0 (32.0)	4.6 (40.3)	7.8 (46.0)	10.8 (51.4)	14.6 (58.3)	14.4 (57.9)	11.2 (52.2)	6.6 (43.9)	4.4 (39.9)	2.6 (36.7)	-0.0 (32.0)
Average precipitation mm (inches)	69.6 (2.74)	61.5 (2.42)	50.7 (2.00)	40.4 (1.59)	19.8 (0.78)	10.9 (0.43)	7.0 (0.28)	11.9 (0.47)	47.5 (1.87)	72.5 (2.85)	81.7 (3.22)	73.3 (2.89)	546.8 (21.54)
Average precipitation days (≥ 1 mm)	9.3	9.1	7.5	6.6	2.8	1.5	1.3	1.9	4.4	7.0	8.7	8.3	68.4
Source: Servizio Meteorologico (1971–2000 data)

Climate data for Monte Scuro (1991–2020 normals, extremes 1971-2020); 1671 m asl
Month	Jan	Feb	Mar	Apr	May	Jun	Jul	Aug	Sep	Oct	Nov	Dec	Year
Record high °C (°F)	21.0 (69.8)	15.4 (59.7)	22.0 (71.6)	21.4 (70.5)	24.2 (75.6)	29.4 (84.9)	32.0 (89.6)	33.2 (91.8)	26.6 (79.9)	29.4 (84.9)	22.6 (72.7)	17.0 (62.6)	33.2 (91.8)
Mean daily maximum °C (°F)	2.7 (36.9)	2.8 (37.0)	5.4 (41.7)	8.5 (47.3)	13.6 (56.5)	17.9 (64.2)	20.4 (68.7)	20.7 (69.3)	15.7 (60.3)	12.5 (54.5)	7.6 (45.7)	3.4 (38.1)	10.9 (51.7)
Daily mean °C (°F)	0.1 (32.2)	-0.0 (32.0)	2.2 (36.0)	5.1 (41.2)	9.8 (49.6)	14.1 (57.4)	16.4 (61.5)	16.8 (62.2)	12.2 (54.0)	9.3 (48.7)	5.1 (41.2)	1.2 (34.2)	7.7 (45.9)
Mean daily minimum °C (°F)	−1.9 (28.6)	−2.2 (28.0)	−0.2 (31.6)	2.3 (36.1)	6.5 (43.7)	10.6 (51.1)	12.8 (55.0)	13.4 (56.1)	9.5 (49.1)	6.9 (44.4)	3.0 (37.4)	−0.7 (30.7)	4.6 (40.3)
Record low °C (°F)	−14.2 (6.4)	−13.0 (8.6)	−13.4 (7.9)	−10.0 (14.0)	−1.6 (29.1)	0.0 (32.0)	3.8 (38.8)	0.0 (32.0)	−0.2 (31.6)	−4.2 (24.4)	−9.6 (14.7)	−14.2 (6.4)	−14.2 (6.4)
Average precipitation mm (inches)	86.2 (3.39)	96.7 (3.81)	73.3 (2.89)	62.6 (2.46)	50.9 (2.00)	28.3 (1.11)	23.0 (0.91)	30.2 (1.19)	52.7 (2.07)	101.6 (4.00)	107.8 (4.24)	102.1 (4.02)	815.4 (32.10)
Average precipitation days (≥ 1.0 mm)	10.67	9.17	8.83	8.83	7.13	4.57	3.00	3.57	7.57	8.23	10.57	11.8	93.94
Average relative humidity (%)	82.43	80.58	76.74	74.50	71.93	68.74	66.72	66.32	75.42	75.47	78.10	82.39	74.95
Average dew point °C (°F)	−3.0 (26.6)	−3.3 (26.1)	−1.8 (28.8)	0.6 (33.1)	4.6 (40.3)	7.9 (46.2)	9.5 (49.1)	9.7 (49.5)	7.9 (46.2)	4.9 (40.8)	1.5 (34.7)	−1.6 (29.1)	3.1 (37.5)
Mean monthly sunshine hours	81.7	85.9	133.1	140.4	204.8	242.0	279.0	279.0	160.7	140.9	89.5	56.8	1,893.8
Source: NOAA, (Sun for 1981-2010), Servizio Meteorologico

=== Geology ===
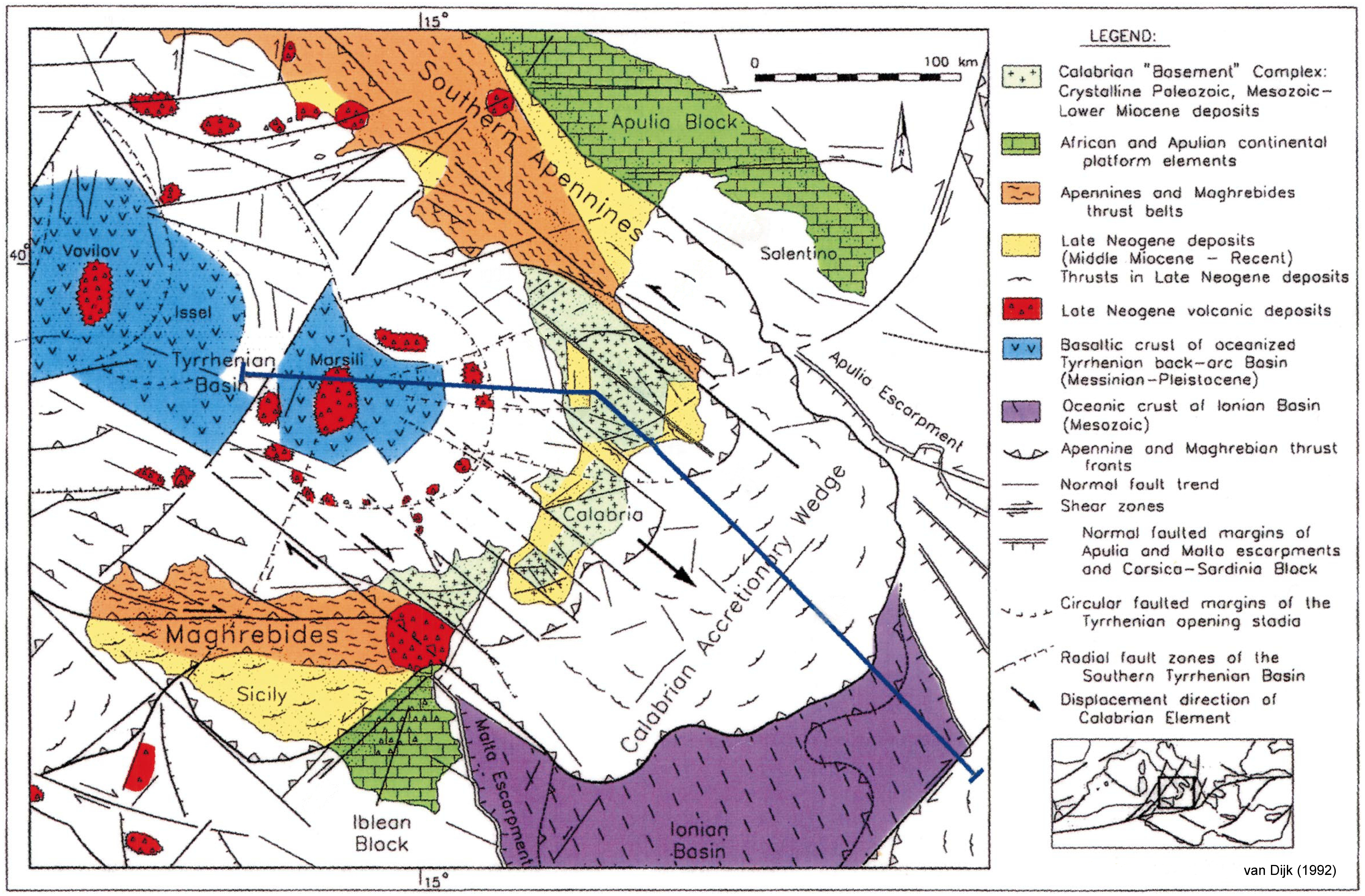
Geotectonic map of the Central Mediterranean Area and the Calabrian Arc. The blue area is the geotectonic cross section depicted below. From van Dijk (1992).

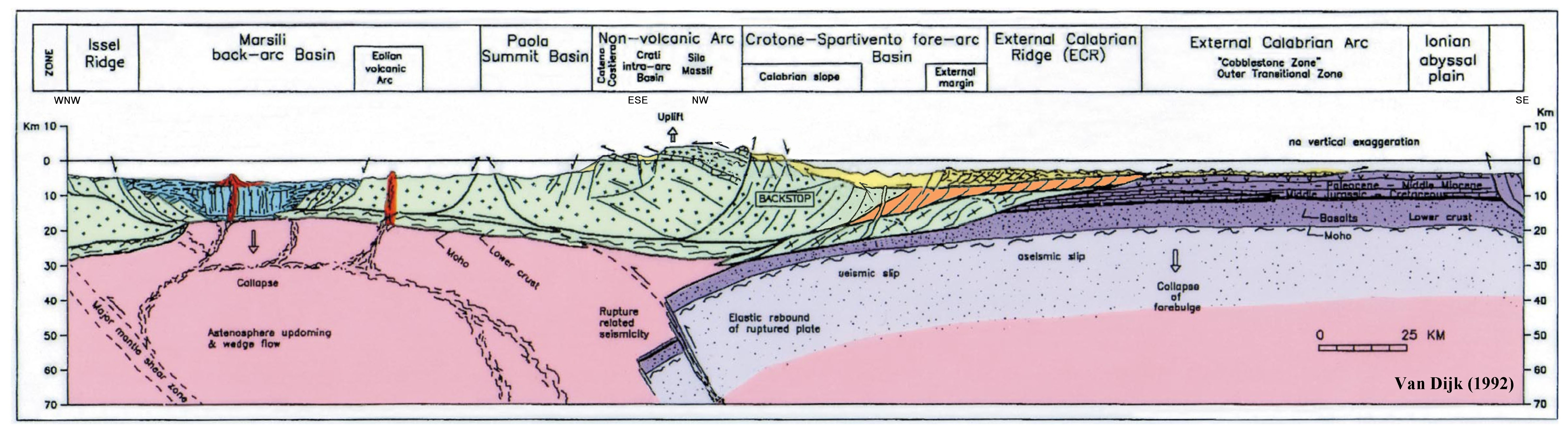
Geotectonic Cross Section of the Calabrian Arc. Left: NW; Right: SE. From van Dijk (1992).

Calabria is commonly considered part of the "Calabrian Arc", an arc-shaped geographic domain extending from the southern part of the Basilicata Region to the northeast of Sicily, and including the Peloritano Mountains (although some authors extend this domain from Naples in the north to Palermo in the southwest). The Calabrian area shows basement (crystalline and metamorphic rocks) of Paleozoic and younger ages, covered by (mostly Upper) Neogene sediments. Studies have revealed that these rocks comprise the upper part of a pile of thrust sheets which dominate the Apennines and the Sicilian Maghrebides.

The Neogene evolution of the Central Mediterranean system is dominated by the migration of the Calabrian Arc to the southeast, overriding the African Plate and its promontories.) The main tectonic elements of the Calabrian Arc are the southern Apennines fold-and-thrust belt, the "Calabria-Peloritani", or simply Calabrian block and the Sicilian Maghrebides fold-and-thrust belt. The foreland area is formed by the Apulia Platform, which is part of the Adriatic Plate, and the Ragusa or Iblean Platform, which is an extension of the African Plate. These platforms are separated by the Ionian Basin. The Tyrrhenian oceanized basin is regarded as the back-arc basin. This subduction system therefore shows the southern plates of African affinity subducting below the northern plates of European affinity.

The geology of Calabria has been studied for more than a century. The earlier works were mainly dedicated to the evolution of the basement rocks of the area. The Neogene sedimentary successions were merely regarded as "post-orogenic" infill of "neo-tectonic" tensional features. In the course of time, however, a shift can be observed in the temporal significance of these terms, from post-Eocene to post-Early Miocene to post-middle Pleistocene.

The region is seismically active and is generally ascribed to the re-establishment of an equilibrium after the latest (mid-Pleistocene) deformation phase. Some authors believe that the subduction process is still ongoing, which is a matter of debate.

== Government ==
Map of the provinces of Calabria

=== Administrative divisions ===
Calabria is divided into 4 provinces and 1 metropolitan city:

Province	Population (2026)	Area (km^{2})	Density (inh./km^{2})	Capital	Municipalities
Catanzaro	338,160	2,415.45	140.0	Catanzaro	80
Cosenza	667,134	6,709.75	99.4	Cosenza	150
Crotone	161,765	1,735.68	93.2	Crotone	27
Reggio Calabria	510,590	3,210.37	159.0	Reggio Calabria	97
Vibo Valentia	149,922	1,150.64	130.3	Vibo Valentia	50

=== Sister jurisdictions ===
- Burwood, Australia
- West Virginia, United States

== Demographics ==
Historical population
Year	Pop.	±%
1861	1,154,840	—
1871	1,218,842	+5.5%
1881	1,281,799	+5.2%
1901	1,439,329	+12.3%
1911	1,525,745	+6.0%
1921	1,627,117	+6.6%
1931	1,723,428	+5.9%
1936	1,771,651	+2.8%
1951	2,044,287	+15.4%
1961	2,045,047	+0.0%
1971	1,988,051	−2.8%
1981	2,061,182	+3.7%
1991	2,070,203	+0.4%
2001	2,011,466	−2.8%
2011	1,959,050	−2.6%
2021	1,855,454	−5.3%
Source: ISTAT

As of 2026, the population is 1,827,571, of which 49.2% are male, and 50.8% are female. Minors make up 15.1% of the population, and seniors make up 25.0%.

=== Immigration ===
As of 2025, immigrants make up 8.2% of the population. The 5 largest foreign countries of birth are Romania, Morocco, Germany, Argentina, and Ukraine.

== Economy ==
The Gross Domestic Product (GDP) of Calabria is subdivided as follows: service industry (28.94%), financial activities and real estate (21.09%), trade, tourism, transportation and communication (19.39%), taxation (11.49%), manufacturing (8.77%), construction (6.19%) and agriculture (4.13%). GDP per capita is 2.34 times less and unemployment is 4 times higher than in Lombardy. Calabria's economy is still based mainly on agriculture.

The economy of the region is strongly affected by the presence of the 'Ndrangheta (the local Mafia syndicate).. In recent years, the judiciary has carried out a close fight against organized crime. This effort has led, since 2021, to more than 200 final convictions following the Rinascita Scott maxi-trial.

=== Agriculture ===
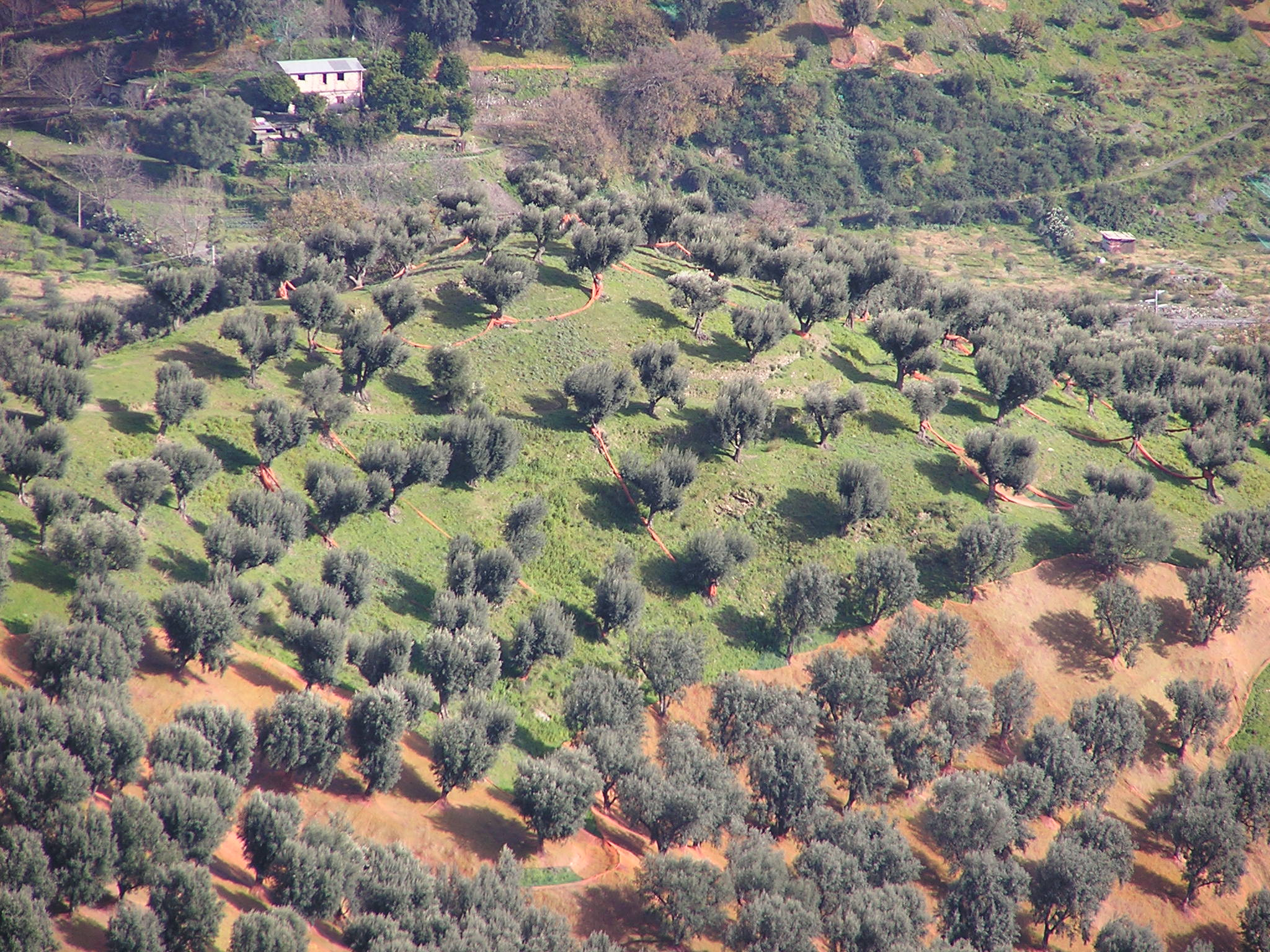
Calabrian olive tree plantations

Calabria is agriculturally rich, with the Italy's second highest number of organic farmers after Sicily.

The red onion of Tropea is cultivated during summer period on the Tyrrhenian coast of central Calabria. It has been awarded with the protected geographical indication (PGI).

The olive tree represents 29.6% of utilized agricultural area (UAA) and approximately 70% of tree crops. Olive tree cultivation extends from coastal lowland areas to hilly and lower mountainous areas. The region is the second-highest for olive oil production with Carolea, Ogliarola, and Saracena olives as the main regional varieties.

In Calabria, there are 3 PDO oils: "Bruzio" in the province of Cosenza, "Lametia" in the area of Lamezia Terme and the more recent "Alto Crotonese". In addition to DOP oils there are also PGI oils. The production area of "Olio di Calabria" PGI includes the entire territory of the Calabria region. The production is made exclusively from indigenous olives.

Calabria produces about a quarter of Italy's citrus fruit. The contribution of this region to growing citrus fruit in Italy can be attributed mainly to clementines, oranges, mandarins and lemons. Calabria is by far the country's most important clementine-growing region, which account for about 62% (16,164 ha) of the Italian surface dedicated to its cultivation and 69% (437,800 tons) of the total production. Clementina di Calabria is the PGI variety grown in the Calabria region. Also chinotto is cultivated and used to produce carbonated soft drink with the same name.

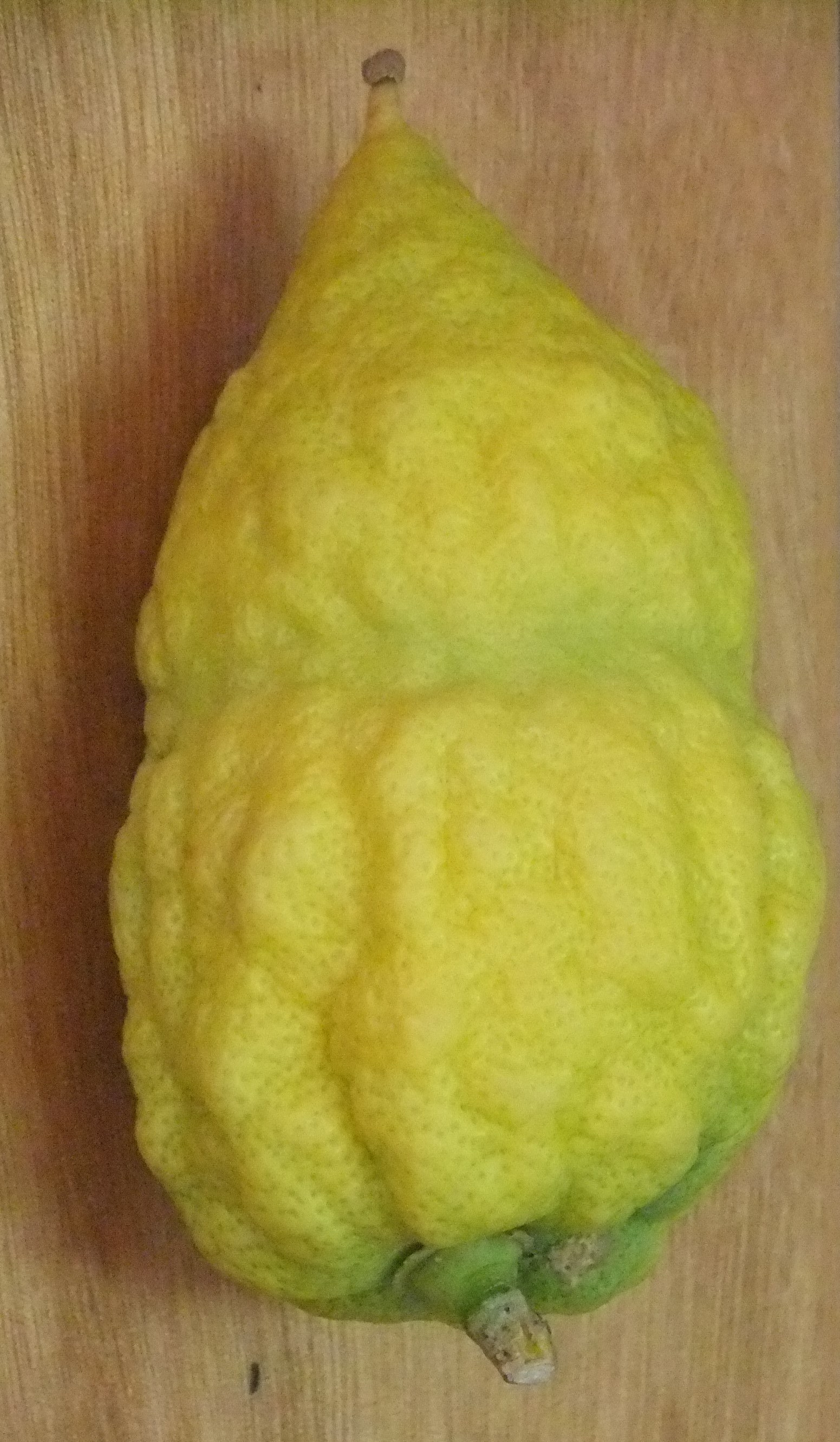
Citron

Minor fruits such as bergamot oranges and citron and lemon-citron hybrids are found exclusively in Calabria. The south coast of the region produces 90% of the world's bergamots, with a huge industry built around the extraction of bergamot oil. According to Harvard Atlas of Economic Complexity, last year with Italian net export of bergamot oil was 2009 in value of $253,000, after that between 2010 and 2018 was no export of it. The Bergamot orange has been intensively cultivated since the 18th century, but only in the coastal area nearby to Reggio, where geological and weather conditions are optimal. The Chabad Hasidic dynasty have a preference to take citrons ("Etrog") from this region for the Sukkot festival.

There is special research Experimental Station for the Industry of the Essential oils and Citrus products in Reggio di Calabria.

Italian Export of citrus oils in 2018	Value
Bergamot	$2,555,000
Orange	$3,770,000
Lemon	$60,100,000
Lime	$0
Citrus, nes	$75,400,000
Jasmine	$0

The province of Cosenza represents an important area for figs growing belonging to cultivar "Dottato" that is used to produce the quality-branded dried figs "Fichi di Cosenza" PDO (protected designation of origin). The anona cherimoya, a plant of tropical origin cultivated in Europe only in Reggio di Calabria and Spain.

In the province of Catanzaro, between San Floro and Cortale, the ancient tradition of sericulture is still kept alive, thanks to young generations.

Calabria is the largest producer of porcini mushrooms in Italy, thanks to the heavily wooded forests of the mountains ranges of Pollino, Sila, Serre and Aspromonte. In addition to porcini mushrooms, red pine mushrooms (rositio) are also produced. Chestnut production is also widespread in the Calabrian mountains.

Peaches and nectarines from Calabria have greatly improved in terms of flavour, quality, safety and service. A part of the production is sold on the domestic market, mainly to retailers. The remaining is exported to Northern Europe, mainly Scandinavia and Germany.

The region boasts a very ancient tradition in the cultivation and production of liquorice. The eighty percent of the national production is concentrated in this region.

Calabria has long coast and produce some distinctive fish products:

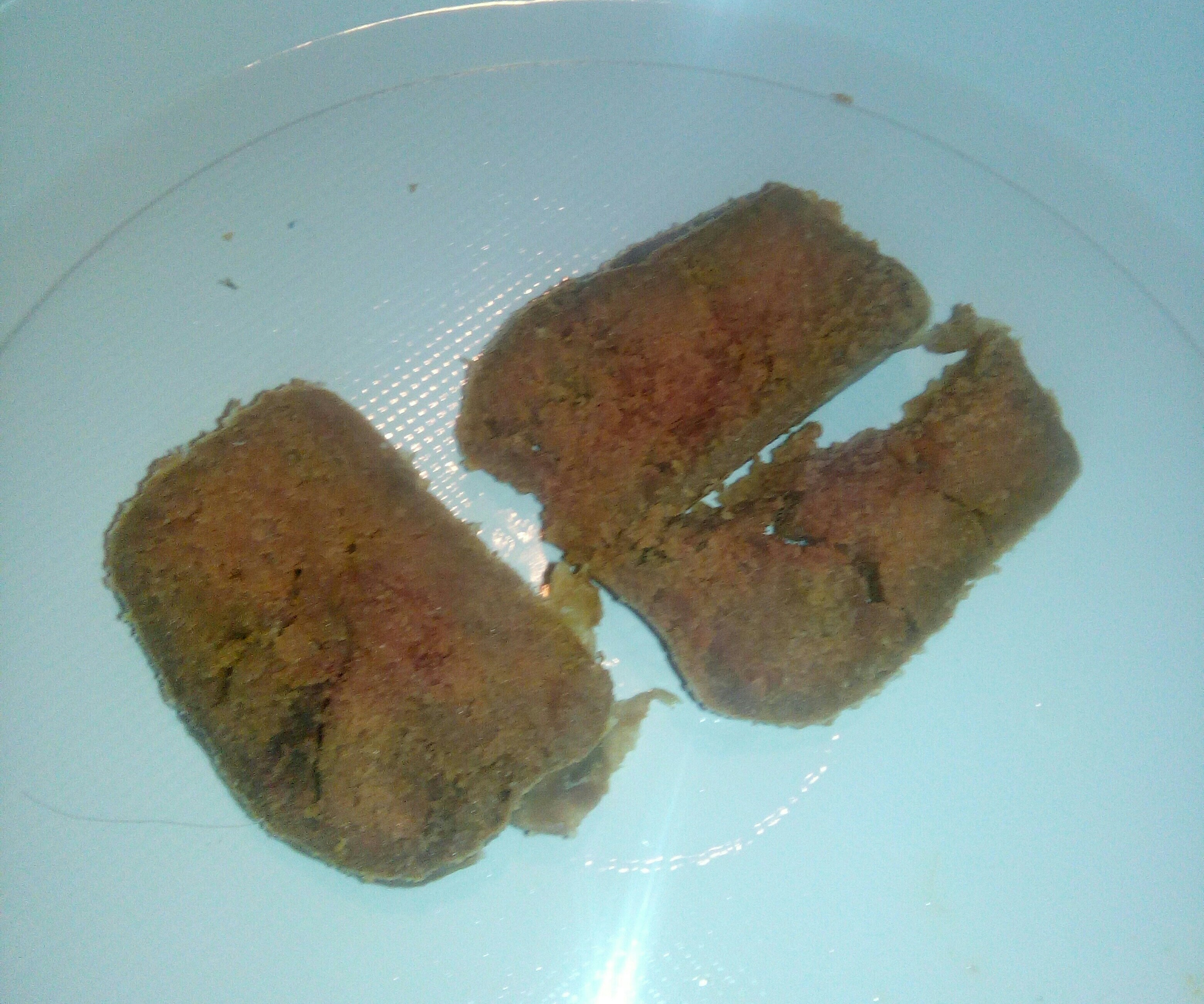
Bottarga di tonno

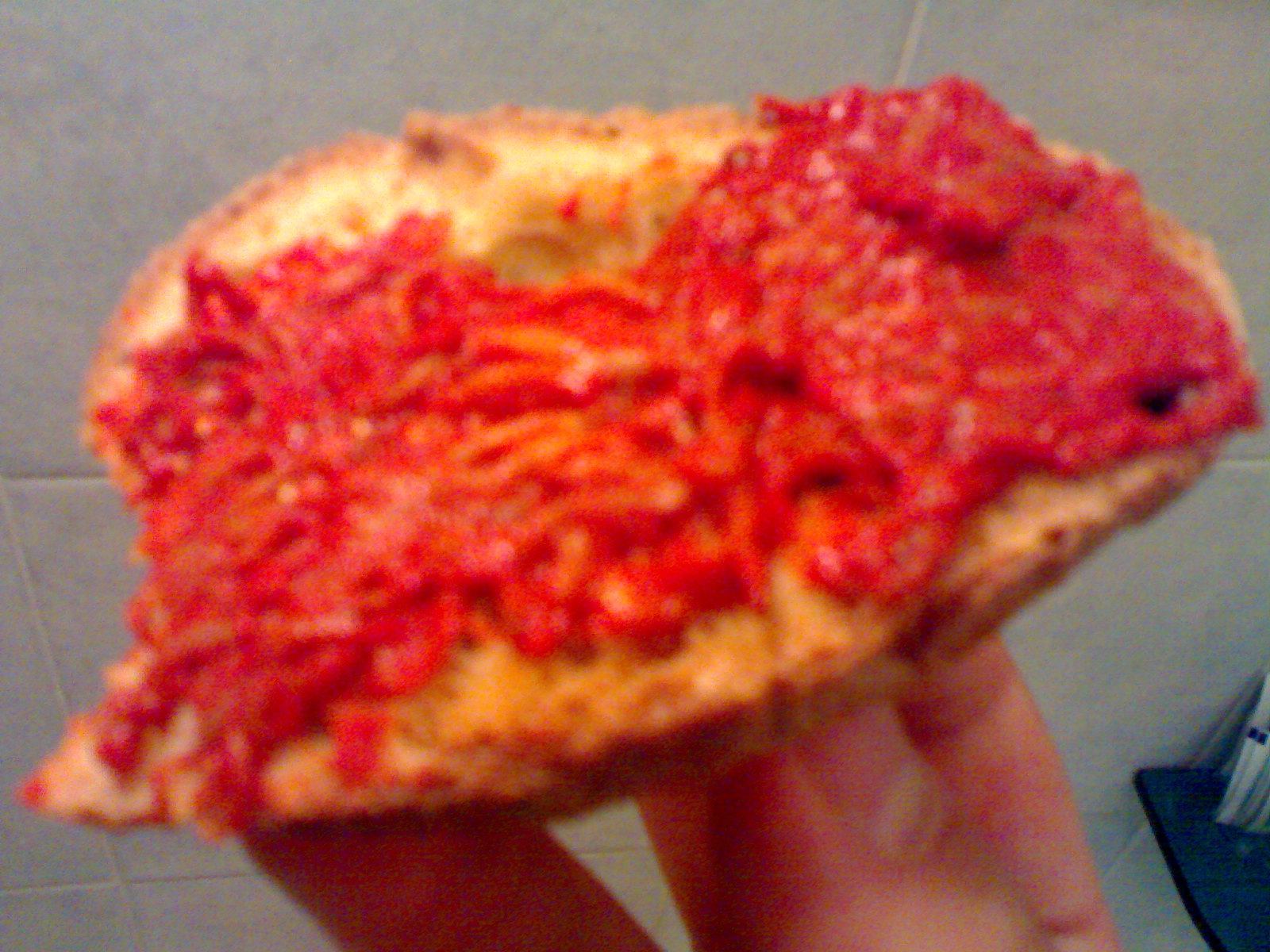
Sardella calabrese

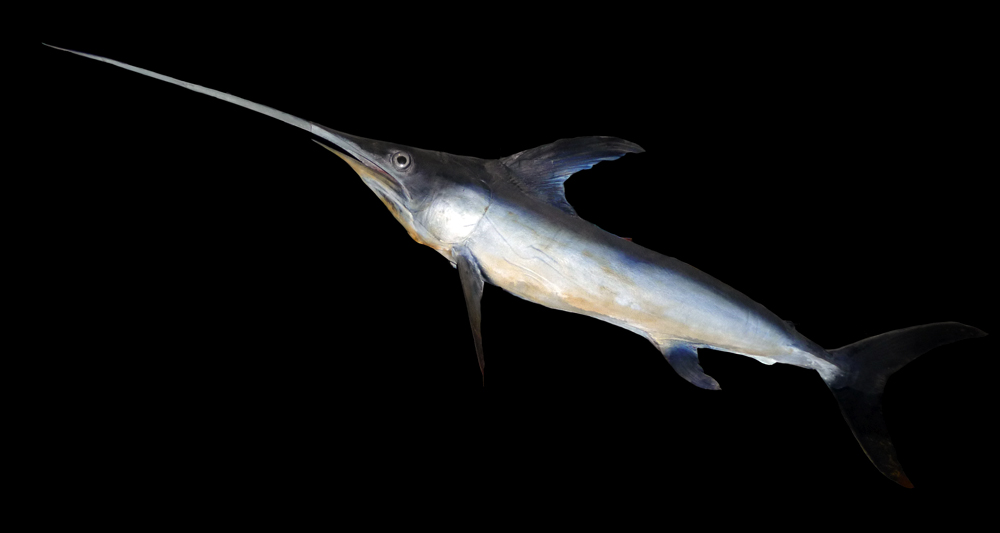
Swordfish

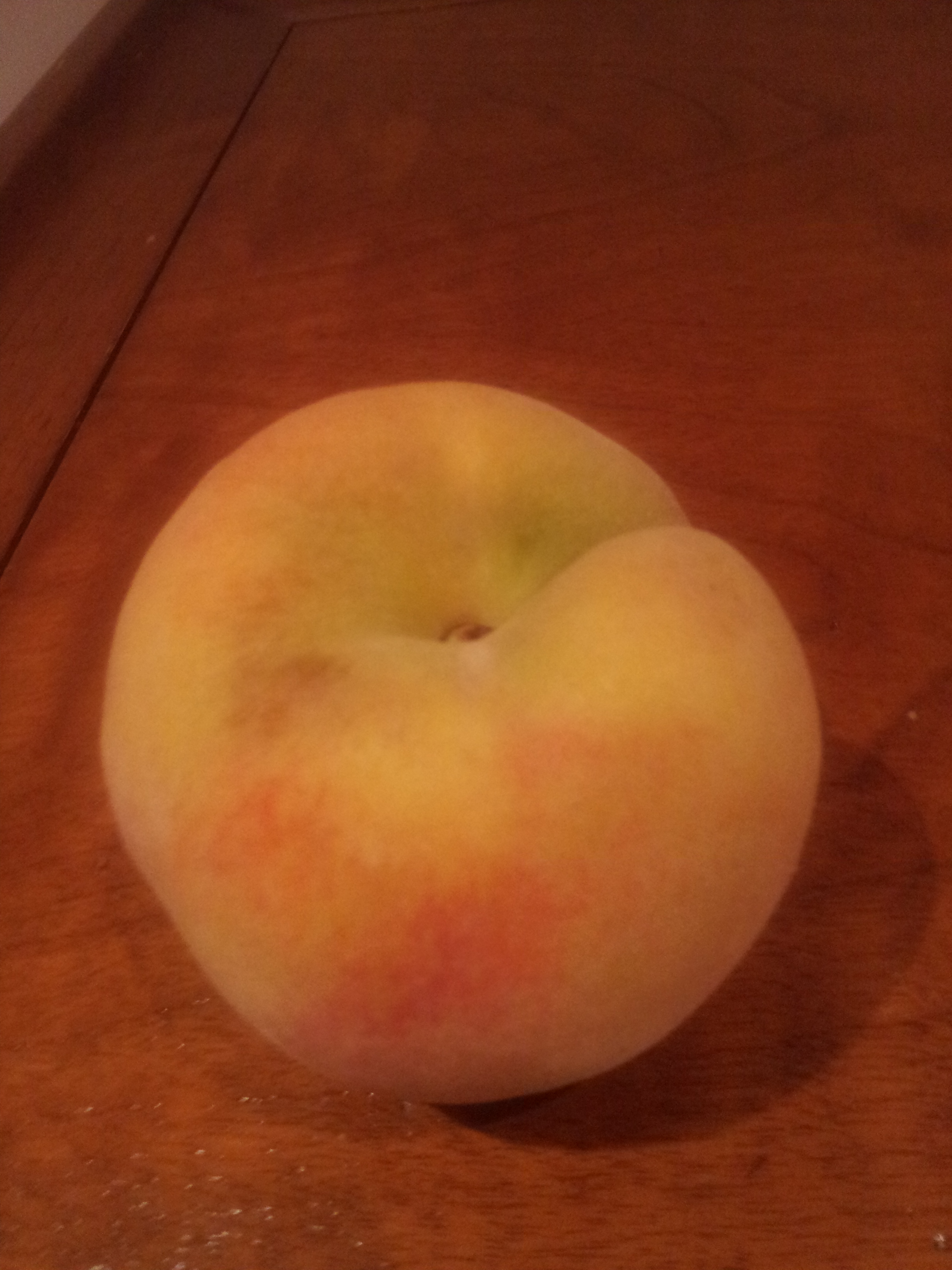
Percoca (variety of peach)

=== Manufacturing ===
Food and textile industries are the most developed and vibrant. Within the industrial sector, manufacturing contributes to a gross value added of 7.2%. In the manufacturing sector the main branches are foodstuff, beverage and tobacco with a contribution to the sector very close to the national average. Over the recent decades some petrochemical, engineering and chemical industries have emerged, within the areas of Crotone, Vibo Valentia and Reggio Calabria.

The province of Catanzaro boasts a great tradition in the textile manufacturing, especially silk. Recently, several young people have given new life to this activity, developing green and sustainable economy projects. In fact, among the municipalities of Girifalco, San Floro and Cortale, sericulture is still practiced, the breeding of silkworms combined with the cultivation of mulberry trees.

Tiriolo and Badolato are known above all for the manufacturing of the "vancale", the typical Calabrian shawl, made of wool or silk, worn by women in ancient times on traditional costumes during the dance of tarantella, or as an ornamental decoration of the houses. Typical in Tiriolo is also the manufacturing of carpets, linen and broom fibers, bobbin lace making, embroidery, precious ceramics, furnishing objects and artistic sculptures. The artistic production of weaving is also active in other centers such as in Platania and Petrizzi where once hemp fibers were also produced.

In Soveria Mannelli, Lanificio Leo, the oldest textile factory in Calabria founded in 1873, is still active. The factory still retains majestic and evocative tools dating back to the late nineteenth century.

The traditional production of artistic ceramics dating back to the Magna Graecia period is handed down in the ancient towns of Squillace and Seminara.

The small town of Serrastretta, a green village in the woods of Presila, is known for its wood production, in particular for its chairs characterized by a very original straw.

There is a plant of Hitachi Rail Italy in Reggio di Calabria, which manufactures railcars of regional trains such as Vivalto.

=== Tourism ===
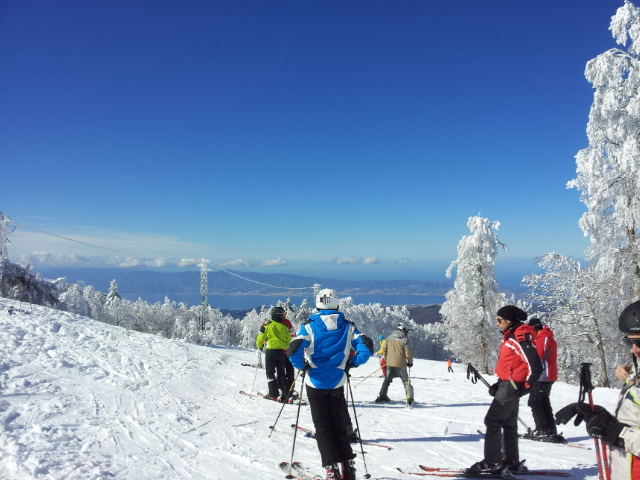
Ski trails near Gambarie overlooking the Strait of Messina

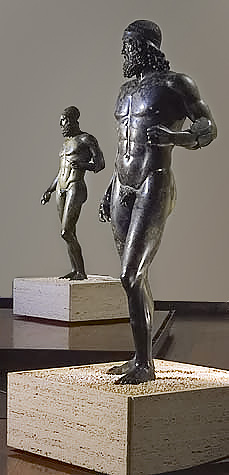
The Riace bronzes, Greek bronzes, about 460–430 BCE

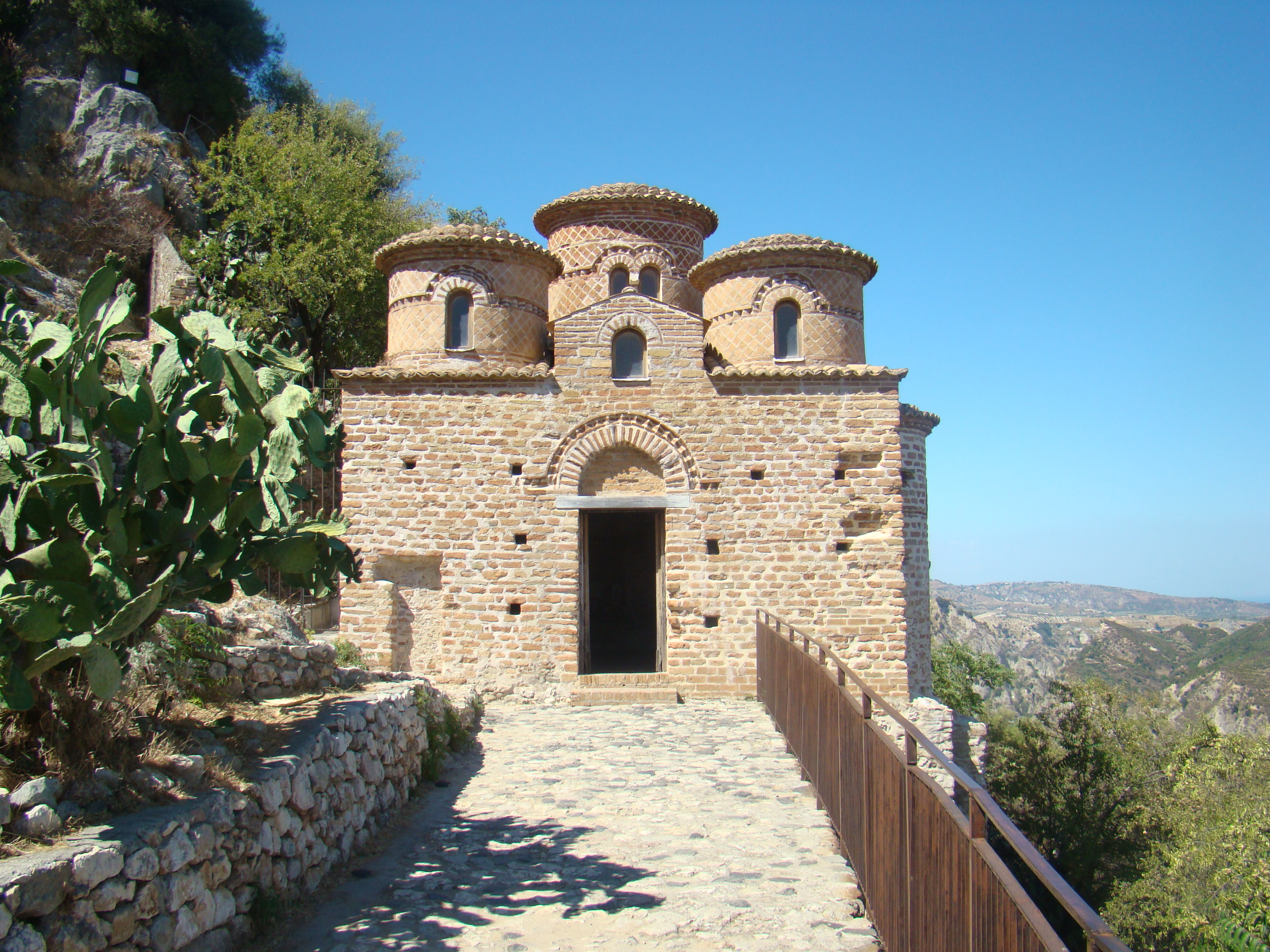
The Byzantine church known as the Cattolica

Tourism in Calabria has increased over the years. The main tourist attractions are the coastline and the mountains. The coastline alternates between rugged cliffs and sandy beaches, and is sparsely interrupted by development when compared to other European seaside destinations. The sea around Calabria is clear, and there is a good level of tourist accommodation. The poet Gabriele D'Annunzio called the coast facing Sicily near Reggio Calabria "... the most beautiful kilometer in Italy" (il più bel chilometro d'Italia). The primary mountain tourist draws are Aspromonte and La Sila, with its national park and lakes. Some other prominent destinations include:

- Reggio Calabria is on the strait between the mainland and Sicily, the largest and oldest city in Calabria dating from the 8th century BCE, known for its panoramic seaside with botanical gardens between the art nouveau buildings and the beaches, and its 3,000 years of history with its Aragonese Castle and the Museo Nazionale della Magna Grecia where the Riace bronzes (Bronzi di Riace) are located.
- Cosenza, birthplace of scientist and philosopher Bernardino Telesio and seat of the Cosentian Academy, known for its cultural institutions, the old quarter, a Hohenstaufen Castle, an open-air museum and an 11th-century Romanesque-Gothic Cathedral. On 12 October 2011, the Cathedral of Cosenza received UNESCO World Heritage status for being "Heritage Witness to a Culture of Peace". This is the first award given by UNESCO to the region of Calabria.
- Scilla, on the Tyrrhenian Sea, "pearl" of the "Violet Coast", has a delightful panorama and is the site of some of Homer's tales.
- Tropea, on the Tyrrhenian Sea coast, is home to a dramatic seaside beach, and the Santa Maria dell'Isola sanctuary. It is also renowned for its sweet red onions (mainly produced in Ricadi).
- Capo Vaticano, on the Tyrrhenian Sea, is a wide bathing place near Tropea.
- Gerace, near Locri, is a medieval city with a Norman Castle and Norman Cathedral.
- Squillace, a seaside resort and important archaeological site. Nearby is the birthplace of Cassiodorus.
- Stilo, the birthplace of philosopher Tommaso Campanella, with its Norman Castle and Byzantine church, the Cattolica.
- Pizzo Calabro, on the Tyrrhenian Sea coast, known for its ice cream called "Tartufo". Interesting places in Pizzo are Piazza Repubblica and the Aragonese castle where Murat was shot.
- Paola, a town situated on the Tyrrhenian Sea coast, renowned for being the birthplace of St. Francis of Paola, patron saint of Calabria and Italian sailors, and for the old Franciscan sanctuary built during the last hundred years of the Middle Ages by the will of St. Francis.
- Sibari, on the Ionian coast, a village situated near the archaeological site of the ancient city of Sybaris, a Greek colony of the 8th century BCE.
- Lamezia Terme, the main transportation hub of the region with its international airport which links it to many destinations in Europe plus Canada and Israel and the train station. Several are the historical sights of the city, like the Norman-Swabian castle, the Jewish historical quarter and the Casa del Libro Antico (House of the Ancient Book) where books from the 16th to the 19th centuries, as well as old globes and ancient maps reproduction are well preserved and available to be seen by the public.
- Catanzaro, an important silk center since the time of the Byzantines, is located at the center of the narrowest point of Italy, from where the Ionian Sea and Tyrrhenian Sea are both visible, but not from Catanzaro. Of note are the well-known one-arch bridge (Viaduct Morandi-Bisantis, one of the tallest in Europe), the cathedral (rebuilt after World War II bombing), the castle, the promenade on the Ionian sea, the park of biodiversity and the archaeological park.
- Soverato on the Ionian Sea, also known as the "Pearl" of the Ionian Sea. Especially renowned for its beaches, boardwalk and nightlife.
- Badolato near Soverato is a well-preserved medieval hilltop village with 13 churches. It was selected as one of the 1000 marvels of Italy to mark the anniversary of the unification of Italy.
- Nicotera on the Tyrrhenian Sea, is a small medieval town with an ancient Ruffo's castle.
- Ancient temples of the Roman gods on the sun-kissed hills of Catanzaro still stand as others are swept beneath the earth. Many excavations are going on along the east coast, digging up what seems to be an ancient burial ground.
- Samo, a village on the foot of the Aspromonte, is well known for its spring water and ruins of the old village destroyed in the 1908 Messina earthquake.
- Mammola, art center, tourist and gastronomic, has an ancient history. The old town, with its small houses attached to each other, the ancient churches and noble palaces. Of particular interest is the Museum Park Santa Barbara, a place of art and cultural events of many international artists and the Shrine of St. Nicodemo of the 10th century, in the highlands of Limina. Its gastronomy with the "Stocco" typical of Mammola, cooked in various ways, other typical products are smoked ricotta and goat cheese, salami pepper and wild fennel, bread "pizza" (corn bread) and wheat bread baked in a wood oven.
- Praia a Mare on the Tyrrhenian Sea, is a well-known tourist city, thanks to the Isola di Dino and the seaside beach.
- Spilinga is known for its spicy pork pâté, 'Nduja.

Calabria attracts year-round tourism, offering both summer and winter activities, in addition to its cultural, historical, artistic heritage, it has an abundance of protected natural habitats and 'green' zones. The 485 mi (781 km) of its coast make Calabria a tourist destination during the summer. The low industrial development and the lack of major cities in much of its territory have allowed the maintenance of indigenous marine life.

The most sought-after seaside destinations are: Tropea, Pizzo Calabro, Capo Vaticano, Reggio Calabria, Soverato, Scilla, Scalea, Sellia Marina, Montepaone, Montauro, Copanello (comune of Staletti), Tonnara di Palmi, Diamante, Paola, Fiumefreddo Bruzio, Amantea, Praia a Mare, Belvedere Marittimo, Roseto Capo Spulico, Corigliano Calabro, Cirò Marina, Amendolara, Roccella Ionica, Bagnara Calabra, Nicotera, Cariati, Zambrone, Isola di Capo Rizzuto, Caminia (comune of Staletti), Siderno, Parghelia, Ricadi and San Nicola Arcella.

In addition to the coastal tourist destinations, the interior of Calabria is rich in history, traditions, art and culture. Cosenza is among the most important cultural cities of Calabria, with a rich historical and artistic patrimony. Medieval castles, towers, churches, monasteries and other French castles and structures from the Norman to the Aragonese periods are common elements in both the interior and coastline of Calabria.

The mountains offer skiing and other winter activities: Sila, Pollino and Aspromonte are three national parks that offer facilities for winter sports, especially in the towns of Camigliatello (comune of Spezzano della Sila), Lorica (comune of San Giovanni in Fiore), Gambarie.

Calabria has many small and picturesque villages, 15 of them have been selected by I Borghi più belli d'Italia (English: The most beautiful Villages of Italy), a non-profit private association of small Italian towns of strong historical and artistic interest, that was founded on the initiative of the Tourism Council of the National Association of Italian Municipalities.

=== Unemployment rate ===
The unemployment rate stood at 20.1% in 2020 and was the highest in Italy and one of the highest inside the European Union.

Year	2006	2007	2008	2009	2010	2011	2012	2013	2014	2015	2016	2017	2018	2019	2020
unemployment rate (in %)	12.8%	11.1%	12.0%	11.3%	11.9%	12.6%	19.4%	22.3%	23.4%	22.9%	23.2%	21.6%	21.6%	21.0%	20.1%

== Infrastructure and transport ==
=== Motorways and rail ===
The region is served by three heavily used roads: two national highways along the coasts (the SS18 between Naples and Reggio Calabria and the SS106 between Reggio Calabria and Taranto) and the A2 motorway, which links Salerno to Reggio Calabria, passing by Cosenza along the old inland route. Building this motorway took 55 years and was extremely over budget due to organized crime infiltration.

The main road infrastructures can be classified into two separate groups, the first including the road infrastructures that cross the whole of Calabria from north to south:

Number	Name and length	Start	End	Toll	Services
Simbolo dell'Autostrada A2 del Mediterraneo	Autostrada A2 del Mediterraneo (278+400 km su 432+600 km)	Start from A30 near Fisciano	Reggio Calabria	Free	Yes
SS 206	Strada statale 106 Jonica (415,000 km su 491+000km)	Taranto	Reggio Calabria	Free	Yes
SS 18	Strada statale 18 Tirrena Inferiore (535,132 km)	Naples	Reggio Calabria	Free	Yes

The second group includes the roads, which run through the region from the Tyrrhenian coast to the Ionian coast (west-east) .

There is high-speed rail on Calabria's Tyrrhenian Coast with the Frecciargento (Silver Arrow) offering a route from Rome to Reggio Calabria. There are also many ferries connecting Calabria with Sicily through the Strait of Messina with the main one being from Villa San Giovanni to Messina.

=== Shipping and ports ===
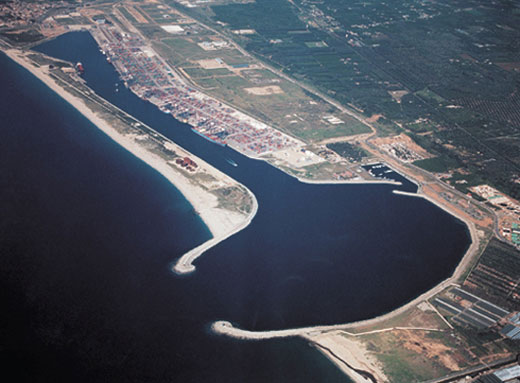
The seaport of Gioia Tauro

The main Calabrian ports are in Gioia Tauro and in Reggio Calabria.

The port of Gioia Tauro has seven loading docks with an extension of 4,646 m (15,243 ft); it is the largest in Italy and the eighth largest container port in Europe, with a 2018 throughput of 4.0 million TEUs from more than 3,000 ships. In a 2006 report, Italian investigators estimated that 80% of Europe's cocaine arrived from Colombia via Gioia Tauro's docks. The port is also involved in the illegal arms trafficking. These activities are controlled by the 'Ndrangheta criminal syndicate.

The port of Reggio is equipped with five loading docks of a length of 1,530 m (5,020 ft).

Other ports:

- Port of Vibo Valentia
- Port of Villa San Giovanni
- Port of Corigliano Calabro
- Port of Crotone

=== Air travel ===
- Lamezia Terme International Airport, currently the busiest airport in Calabria in terms of number of passengers per year.
- Reggio Calabria Airport, located a few kilometres from Reggio Calabria's city centre, built in 1939 and was Calabria's first airport.
- Crotone Airport

=== Bridges ===
Calabria has the two highest bridges in Italy:

- Italia Viaduct
- Sfalassa Viaduct (also the highest and longest span frame bridge in the world)

=== Planned bridge ===
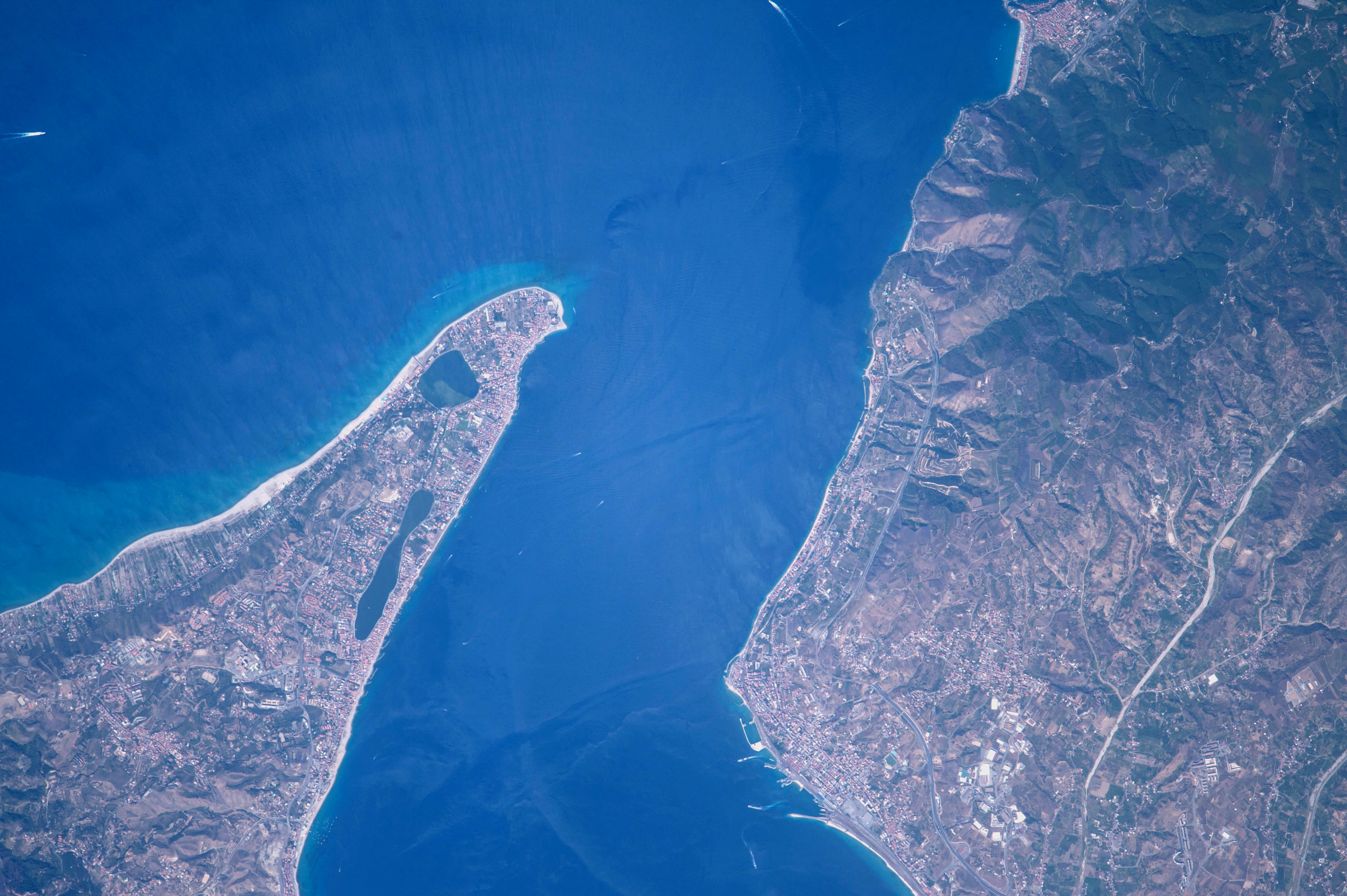
The Strait of Messina photographed from space

Plans for a bridge linking Sicily to Calabria have been discussed since 1865. Throughout the last decade, plans were developed for a road and rail link to the mainland via what would be the world's longest suspension bridge, the Strait of Messina Bridge. Planning for the project has experienced several false starts over the past few decades. On 6 March 2009, Silvio Berlusconi's government declared that the construction works for the Messina Bridge would begin on 23 December 2009, and announced a pledge of €1.3 billion as a contribution to the bridge's total cost, estimated at €6.1 billion. The plan has been criticized by environmental associations and some local Sicilians and Calabrians, concerned with its environmental impact, economic sustainability and even possible infiltrations by organized crime.

In August 2025, the Strait of Messina Bridge was given final approval by the Meloni government. Construction is expected to commence in the fall of 2025. The bridge will connect Villa San Giovanni and Torre Faro when it opens in 2032 and it will be the longest suspension bridge in the world.

== Language ==
La Gàrdia (Guardia Piemontese) and the other main cities of Occitania, in the Occitan language

Although the official national language of Calabria has been Standard Italian since before unification in 1861, Calabria has dialects that have been spoken in the region for centuries. The Calabrian language is a direct derivative of Latin. Most linguists divide the various dialects into two different language groups. In the northern area of the region, the Calabrian dialects are considered part of the Neapolitan language and are grouped as Northern Calabrian. In the rest of the region, the Calabrian dialects are often grouped as Central and Southern Calabrian, and are considered part of the Sicilian language. However, in Guardia Piemontese, as well as some quarters of Reggio Calabria, a variety of Occitan called Gardiol can also be found. In addition, since Calabria was once ruled by the French and Spanish, some Calabrian dialects exhibit Spanish and French influences. Another important linguistic minority, in the nine towns of Bovesìa in the province of Reggio Calabria, speaks a derivative of ancient Greek called Grecanico, a remnant of Byzantine rule and ancient Magna Graecia.

=== Religion ===
The majority of Calabrians are Roman Catholic. Historically, Calabrians were Greek Orthodox, and in 732 the dioceses of southern Italy were even moved to the jurisdiction of the Patriarch of Constantinople. There are also communities of Evangelicals in the region. Calabria has also been called "The Land of Saints" as the region was the birthplace of many saints spanning nearly 2,000 years. The most famous saint in Calabria and also the patron saint of the region is St. Francis of Paola. Calabria also has another patron saint called Saint Bruno of Cologne who was the founder of the Carthusian Order. Saint Bruno would build the charterhouse of Serra San Bruno, a town which bears his name, in 1095 and later die there in 1101.

Even though it is currently a very small community, there has been a long history of the presence of Jews in Calabria. The Jews have had a presence in the region for at least 1600 years and possibly as much as 2300 years. Calabrian Jews have had notably influence on many areas of Jewish life and culture. Although virtually identical to the Jews of Sicily, the Jews of Calabria are considered a distinct Jewish population due to historical and geographic considerations. There is a small community of Italian Anusim who have resumed the Jewish faith.

It is important to highlight the presence of Calabrians in Renaissance humanism and in the Renaissance. Indeed, the Hellenistics in this period frequently came from Calabria maybe because of the Greek influence. The rediscovery of Ancient Greek was very difficult because this language had been almost forgotten. In this period the presence of Calabrian humanists or refugees from Constantinople was fundamental. The study of Ancient Greek, in this period, was mainly a work of two monks of the monastery of Seminara: Barlaam, bishop of Gerace, and his disciple, Leonzio Pilato. Pilato, in particular, was a Calabrian born near Reggio Calabria. He was an important teacher of Ancient Greek and translator, and he helped Giovanni Boccaccio in the translations of Homer's works.

== Cuisine ==
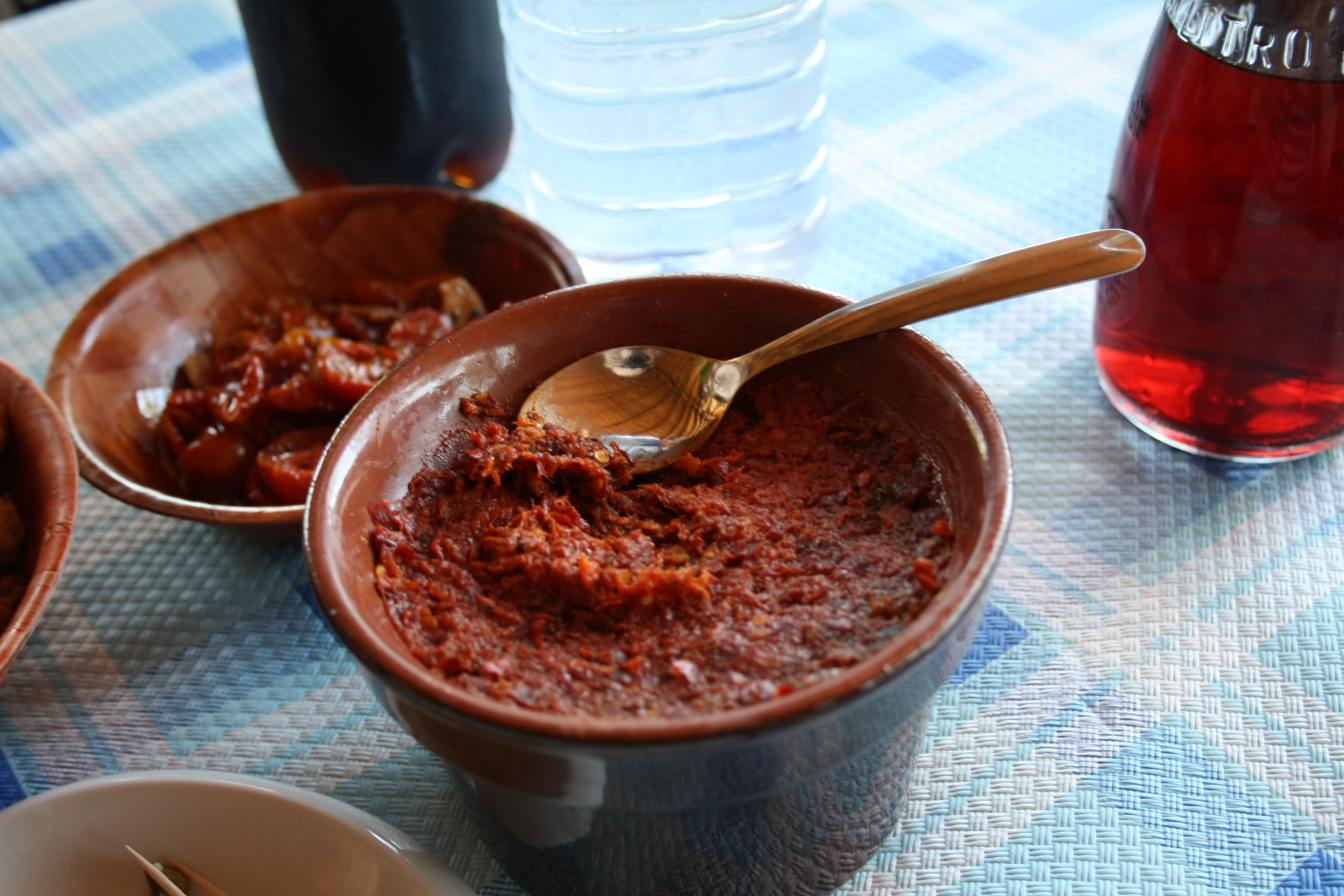
'Nduja

The cuisine is a typical southern Italian Mediterranean cuisine with a balance between meat-based dishes (pork, lamb, goat), vegetables (especially eggplant), and fish. Pasta (as in central Italy and the rest of southern Italy) is also very important in Calabria. In contrast to most other Italian regions, Calabrians have traditionally placed an emphasis on the preservation of their food and packing vegetables and meats in olive oil, and on making sausages and cold cuts (soppressata, 'nduja, capocollo). Along the coast fish is cured, especially swordfish, sardines (sardelle rosamarina) and cod (baccalà). Local desserts are typically fried, honey-sweetened pastries such as cudduraci, nacatole, scalille or scalidde, or baked biscotti-type treats such as nzudda.

Some local specialties include caciocavallo cheese, cipolla rossa di Tropea (red onion), frìttuli and curcùci (fried pork), liquorice (liquirizia), lagane e cicciari (a pasta dish with chickpeas), pecorino crotonese (sheep cheese), morzello (bowels of veal), and pignolata.

In ancient times Calabria was referred to as Enotria (from Ancient Greek Οἰνωτρία, Oenotria, 'land of wine'). According to ancient Greek tradition, Οἴνωτρος (Oenotrus), the youngest of the sons of Lycaon, was the eponym of Oenotria. Some vineyards have origins dating back to the ancient Greek colonists. The best known DOC wines are Cirò (province of Crotone) and Donnici from the Donnici region (province of Cosenza). 3% of the total annual production qualifies as DOC. Important grape varieties are the red Gaglioppo and white Greco. Many producers are resurrecting local, ancient grape varieties which have been around for as long as 3000 years.

== Sport ==
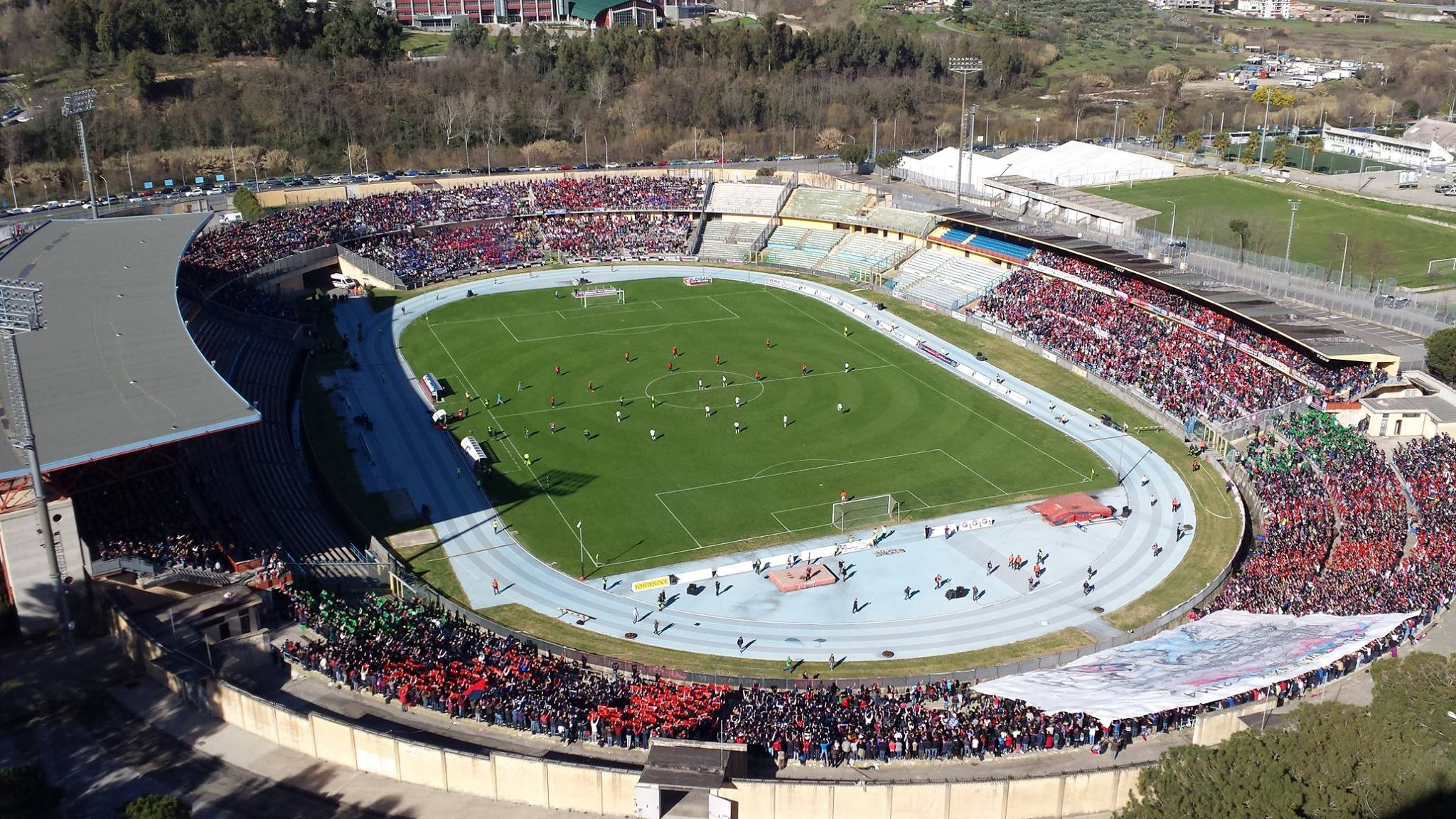
Cosenza Calcio Stadium

The most popular sport in Calabria is football. Calabria hosts a team in Serie B (Catanzaro) and 2 in Serie C (Cosenza Calcio & FC Crotone). Other big teams of the region are Reggina and Vibonese who are in Serie D.

Viola Reggio Calabria is an Italian professional basketball club based in Reggio Calabria, Calabria.

== Universities ==
There are 3 public universities in the region of Calabria

- University of Calabria (Cosenza)
- Magna Graecia University (Catanzaro)
- Mediterranea University of Reggio Calabria

There is also the private University for Foreigners "Dante Alighieri" in Reggio Calabria.

== Health ==
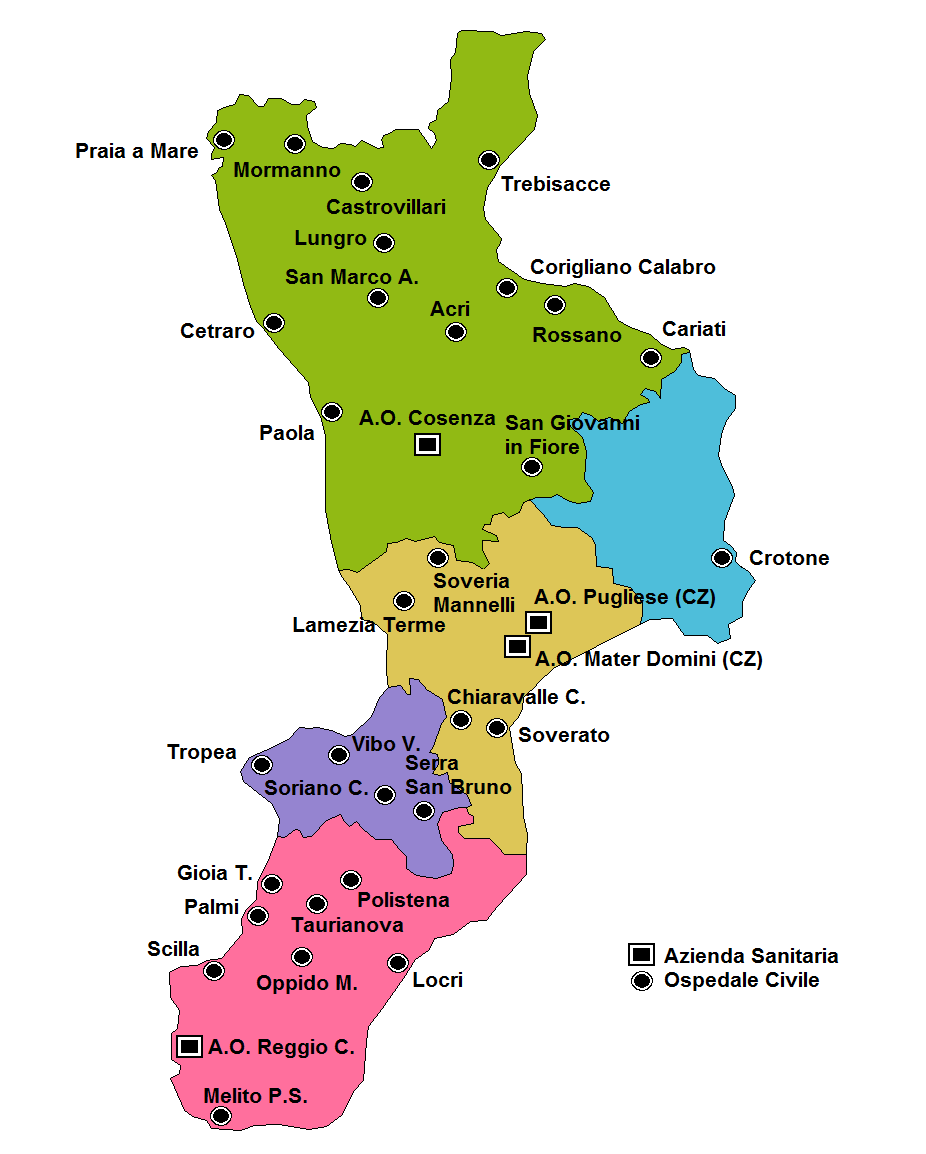
Public hospitals in Calabria

The health service in Calabria is organized into four main public hospitals and thirty secondary ones, and there are numerous private hospital facilities. Because of their debts, since 2009 they were administered by an extraordinary commissioner. It has been seen as an unavoidable step to return to an ordinary and cost-effective administration at a regional level, as it is provided by the Italian Constitution.

The four main public hospitals are

- Azienda Ospedaliera "Pugliese-Ciaccio", Catanzaro
- Azienda Ospedaliera "Mater Domini", Catanzaro
- Azienda Ospedaliera di Cosenza, Cosenza
- Ospedali Riuniti di Reggio Calabria, Reggio Calabria

== See also ==
- 1783 Calabrian earthquakes
- 1905 Calabria earthquake
- 1908 Messina earthquake
- Arbëreshë people
- Duke of Calabria
- Bruttians
- Grecanici
- Magna Graecia
- Oenotrians
- Strait of Messina Bridge
- Theme of Sicily
- 'Ndrangheta
