= Flag of Calabria =

- Proportion: 2:3
- Adopted: 21 May 1999
- Design: A blue field with the coat of arms of Calabria in the centre, and the words "Regione Calabria" above and below

The flag of Calabria is one of the official symbols of the region of Calabria, Italy. The current flag was adopted on 15 June 1992.

== Symbolism ==
The flag is the coat of arms of Calabria superimposed on the a field of blue, with the words "Regione Calabria" above and below the arms. The coat of arms, adopted on 15 June 1992, is a disc, quartered in saltire, with, clockwise from the top, a pine tree, a Teutonic cross, a light blue truncated Doric column and a Byzantine cross.
