= Frittole (meat dish) =

Traditional pork dish from Calabria, Italy

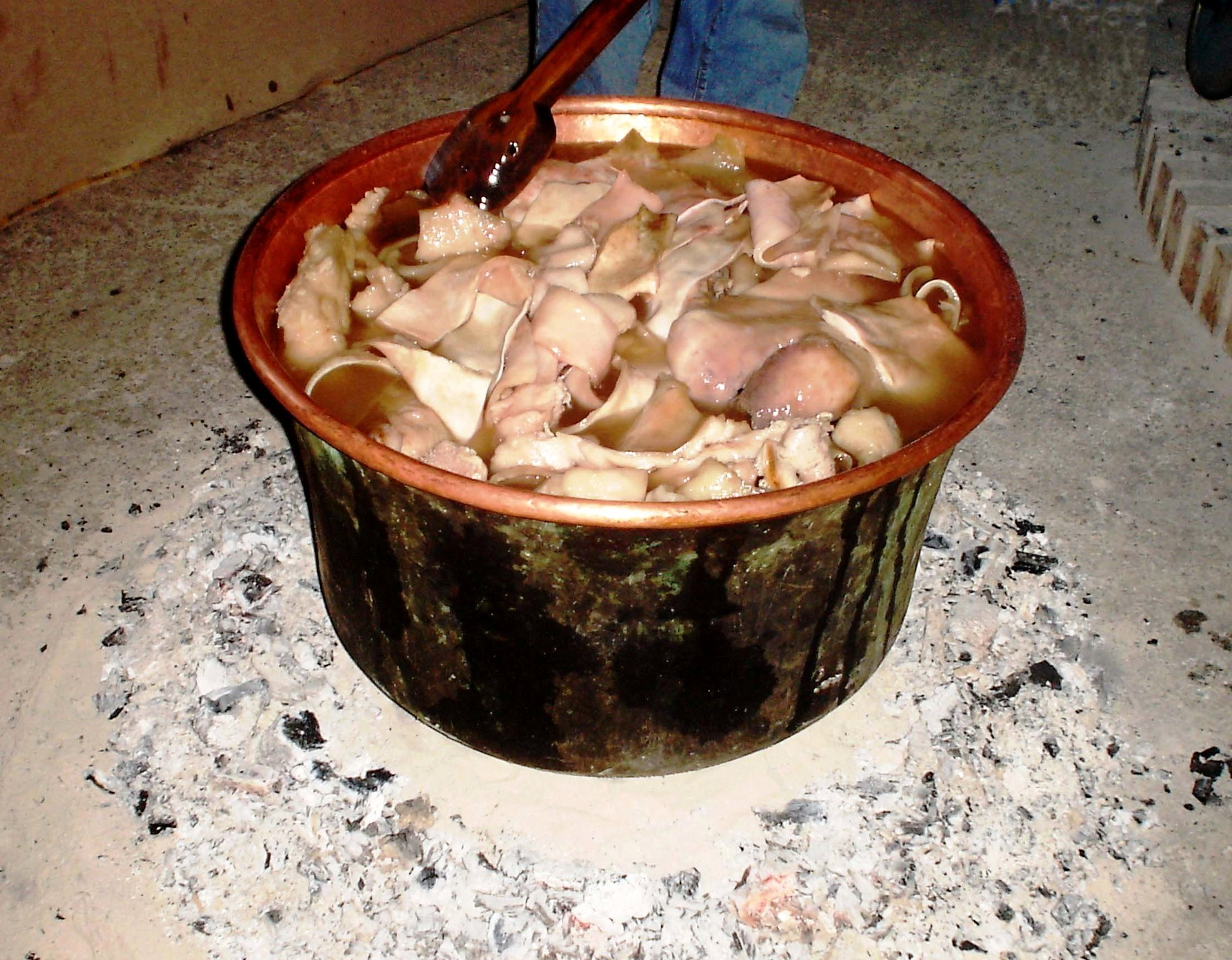
Frittole being prepared in a caddàra

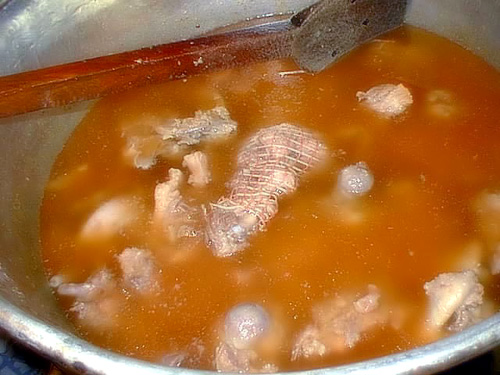
Frittole being cooked

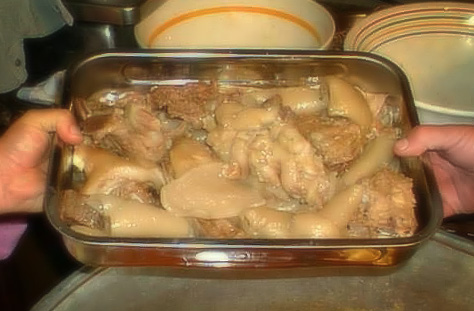
Frittole after cooking

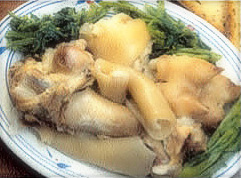
Plate of frittole

Frittole di maiale (in Calabrian dialect frittuli, rarely in the singular frittula) is a traditional dish made of pork parts in the city of Reggio Calabria and the surrounding province. Curcùci is also made in the preparation process. Frittola (frittula in Parlemitan dialect) is a similar dish eaten in Palermo, Sicily, made from calf instead of pork.

Frittole is prepared by cooking pork rind, pork meat and other less noble parts of the pig (part of the neck, cheek, tongue, nose, ears, kidneys, etc.) with pork fat (for taste). A Lonely Planet travel guide describes it as a soup made from meat, marrow and fat.

It is cooked slowly over embers of coal and stirred in the caddàra, the traditional tinned copper pot that is set up outside the butcher (traditionally on Saturdays) to serve the food freshly prepared so as to be consumed hot. Once you have exhausted the content of the cooking, all that remains on the bottom of the pot, leftovers and suet, it solidifies and takes the name of curcùci (product very similar to the Neapolitan pork) that can be consumed in various ways, including with scrambled eggs. Another typical dish is curcùci con polenta e broccoli (lit. 'curcùci with polenta and broccoli'), which is consumed during the winter) and with pitta con ricotta, ova (lit. 'eggs') e curcùci (typical dish of the Easter Monday outing, the day that in Reggio is called "Pascuni").

The butchering of the pig, in Calabria, is a true collective ritual, of a liberating and at the same time propitiatory, during which the threat of natural forces is imprisoned in a symbolic ritual and culture. The typical popular saying "ru porcu not si jetta nenti" ('of the pig, nothing has to wasted') indicates that during all stages of the killing and slaughter, it takes food from all parts of the animal.

The frittole in Reggio Calabria, by tradition, are consumed during the Feast of Our Lady of Consolation, during which the aroma can be smelt around the old town, helping to create the colorful and distinctive festive atmosphere for the people.

In Mammola, an ancient tradition survives of singing a serenade during the killing of the pig, sung and played with accordion and guitar to honor the family. This special evening is celebrated with friends and family with the tasting of frittole, accompanied by a glass of wine and bread pizza (cornbread), prepared during the day and cooked in the typical caddàra. In other cultures, specifically Ancient Greek, the pig skin's wrinkle count is used to augur the gender of a newborn. If the pig skin has an even number of wrinkles, the child is predicted to be female. On the other hand, if the pig skin tallies an odd number of wrinkles, then the child is going to be a male.

The frittole are consumed in many ways, but more traditionally during the weekly Saturday rituals u pani ca 'scorcìtta ('bun with rind'), accompanied by the local red wine.

There is still the custom to hold the typical frìttuli, a big table with unique dishes, red wine and citrus fruit salad (oranges, lemons, bergamot) to end a meal.

In the province of Cosenza, the frìttuli and frisui are matched with the fried egg.

== See also ==
- Frittola
