= Frittola (meat dish) =

Sicilian street food

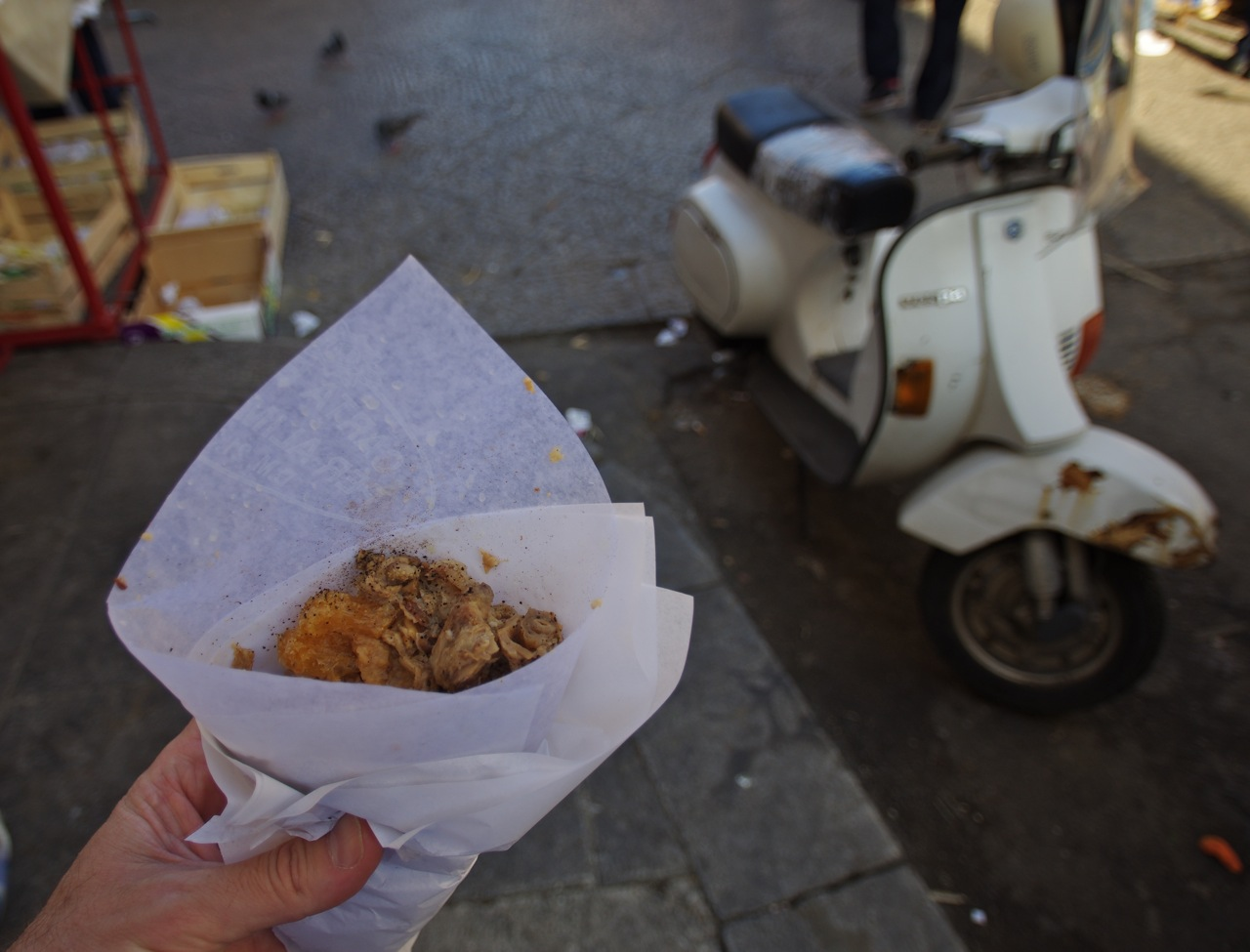
Frittola in Ballaro market Palermo, Sicily

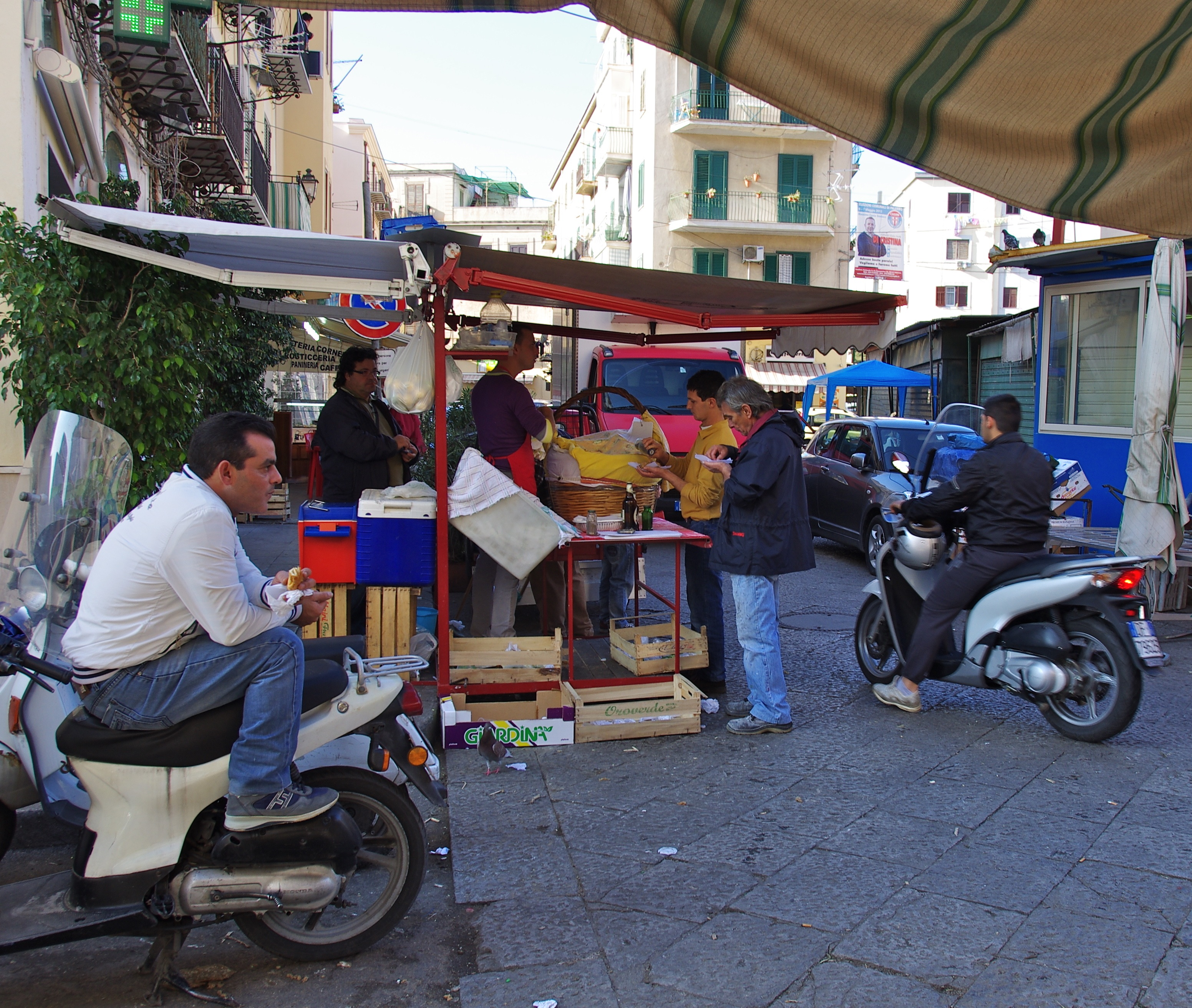
Frittola served streetside in a Palermo market

Frittola (frittula in Palermitan dialect) is a traditional Sicilian street food from the Palermo region of Italy. It is similar to the frittole from Reggio Calabria, but seems to use calf parts instead of pig.

The waste left from the slaughter of mechanically processed calves includes bones that are ground for industrial use, and pieces of meat boiled at high temperature in large silos. After the meat is cooked it is pressed to remove moisture and formed into bales. This process, similar to lyophilization (freeze drying), can preserve the frittoli for years.

The frittularu "revives" the frittoli by frying it with lard and placing it in a large wicker basket (the panaru) and a cloth of flavorings such as bay leaf, and pepper. It is served by hand and placed on a sheet of waxed paper or in a bun or focaccia.

Frittola was once transported by donkey, but is now sold from three-wheeled vans. One author describes the dish as "oil fried fat and cartilage". An 1869 book reports frittola in Venice, although this most likely refers to a sweet or savoury fried dough rather than the meaty version from Palermo.

== See also ==
- Frittole
