= Praia a Mare =

- Comune
- Comune di Praia a Mare
- Coat of arms

- Location within Italy Location within Calabria
- Coordinates: 39°55′N 15°46′E
- Country: Italy
- Region: Calabria
- Province: Cosenza (CS)
- Frazioni: Fiuzzi, Foresta, Laccata

Government
  - Mayor: Antonino de Lorenzo

Area
  - Total: 23.59 km^{2} (9.11 sq mi)
- Elevation: 5 m (16 ft)

Population (31 May 2010)
  - Total: 6,805
  - Density: 288.5/km^{2} (747.1/sq mi)
- Demonym: Praiesi
- Time zone: UTC+1 (CET)
  - Summer (DST): UTC+2 (CEST)
- Postal code: 87028
- Dialing code: 0985
- Patron saint: Madonna of the Grotto
- Saint day: 15 August
- Website: Official website

Praia a Mare (Italian: [ˈpraːja a mˈmaːre]) is a town and comune of the province of Cosenza in the Calabria region of Italy. It is a beach resort on the Tyrrhenian Sea.

== Geography ==
The 2 km long beach is the main attraction for tourists. It is sandy at its northern end but increasingly pebbly moving southwards. During the summer months, the beach is divided into about 50 lidos, although intermittently there are unprotected slivers of beach open to the public at no cost.

At the southern end of the town, about 100 m from shore sits a rock outcrop called Dino Island which features a number of large sea caves, accessible by small craft and paddle boats. At the most southerly extremity of the beach, a medieval tower, built by Byzantine forces to guard the coast, sits on an outcropping of volcanic rock with a commanding view of the sea approaches to Praia a Mare.

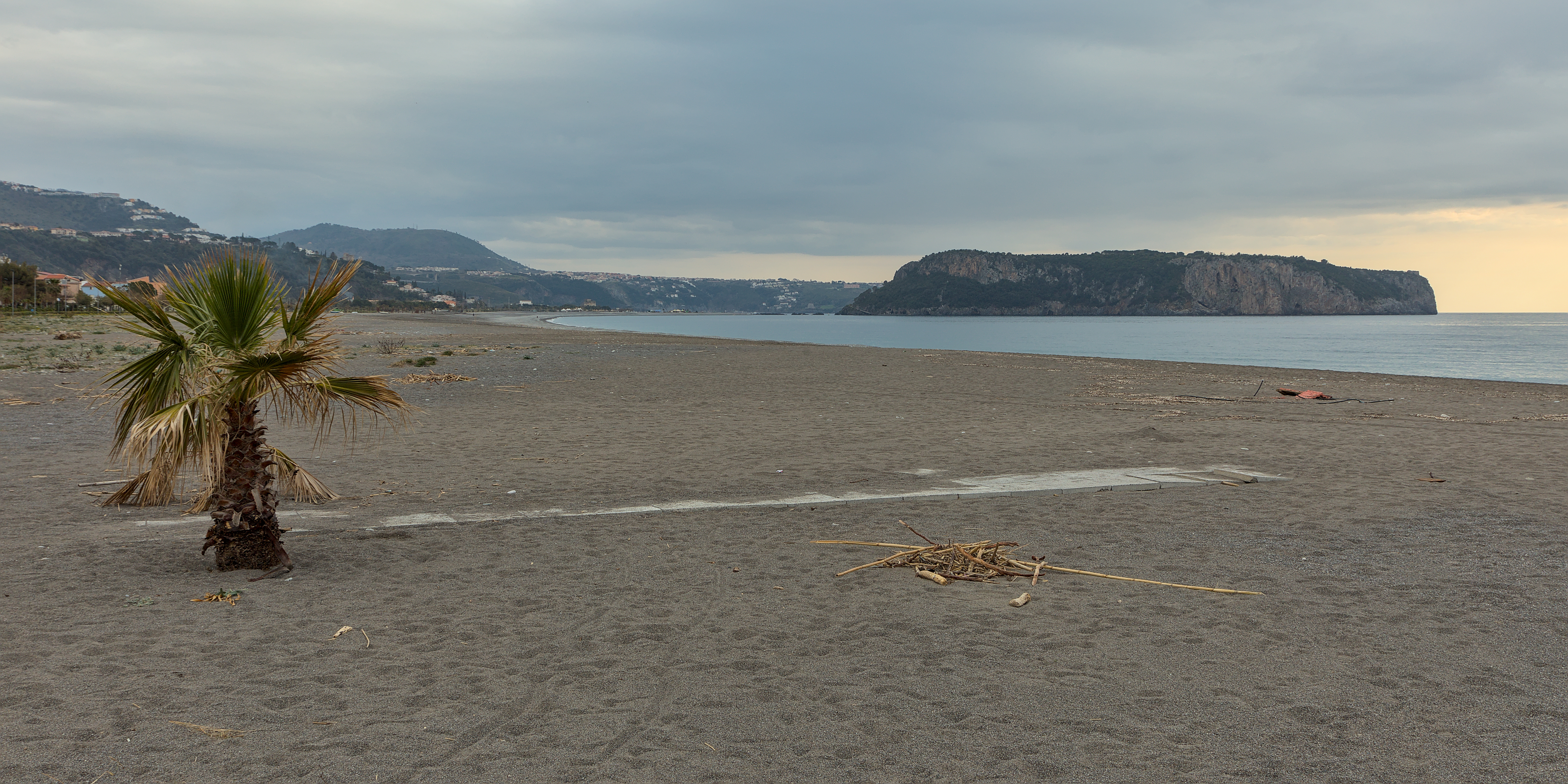
The beach in winter, with Dino Island in the background

About 50 meters up the slopes of a mountain that rises precipitously above the town is another large cave complex, also carved by wave action several million years ago, inside of which is a completely built church of Madonna della Grotta, and an open air sanctuary. Both the church and sanctuary are both in use today. Other sights include the Rocca (14th century), built by the Normans, and the 16th century Fortino ("Small Fort").

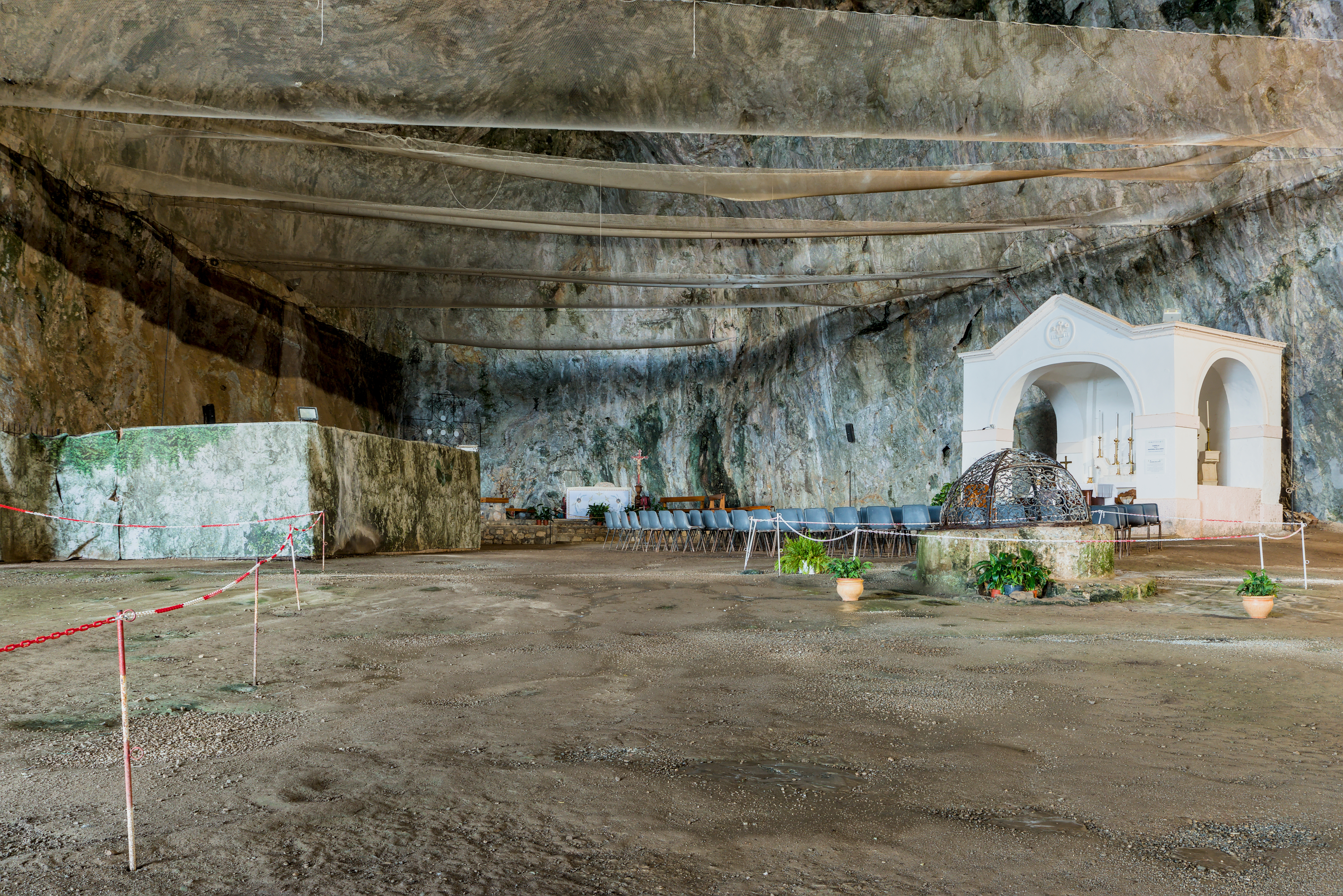
The cave church of Madonna della Grotta

Near the sanctuary is the site of an archaeological excavations: findings include bones of a prehistoric shark.
