= Galluppi =

- Family coat of arms
- Country: Kingdom of Sicily; Kingdom of the Two Sicilies; Kingdom of Italy; Italy
- Origin: Calabria
- Founded: 14th century
- Founder: Cristoforo Galluppi
- Titles: Barons of Cirella and Joppolo; Barons of Pancaldo; Knights of the Order of Malta
- Connected members: Pasquale Galluppi; Giuseppe Galluppi

The Galluppi family is an Italian noble family originally from Tropea and comprising various branches, one of which settled in France in the fourteenth century, another in Sicily around the end of the sixteenth. One of the members of the family named Cristoforo married in 1340 Donna Giacoma Ruffo, baroness of Altavilla, obtaining as a dowry half of the baronial fiefdom of Altavilla.

== Branch of Messina and Santa Lucia del Mela ==
Don Cesare Galluppi, baron of Cirella and Joppolo, descendant of Cristoforo, who lived at the end of the sixteenth century, moved to Messina, where he married Giovanna Porzio, being ascribed by the senate to the nobility of that city. With him began the Messina branch of the Galluppi, which a few decades later moved to Santa Lucia del Mela with Don Onofrio Galluppi.

Francesco Galluppi, baron of Cirella, Joppolo and Coccorino and owner of other important assets in Calabria, eldest son of Don Cesare and Donna Giovanna Porzio, squandered almost all of his father's assets in a short time. He had married in 1611 in Messina with Isabella Patti, only daughter of Ansaldo, heiress of the feud of Belvedere and of the territory of San Girolamo, located near the city of Santa Lucia. His nephew Francesco Galluppi participated in the revolution of the Merli and Malvizzi and was one of the commanders of the city of Messina against the Spaniards; for this reason he suffered the confiscation of the feud of Belvedere in 1674.

In Santa Lucia, the Galluppis were for generations at the top of political and ecclesiastical power. An Ansaldo Galluppi Patti (b. 1721), with privilege of 15 September 1748, obtained from Charles III the title of baron of Cirella (a fief already owned by his ancestors) and bought the fief of Foresta from the city of Santa Lucia.

Baron Don Vincenzo Galluppi, son of Ansaldo, returned to Tropea to revive in that city the other branch of the family, which was in danger of extinction. In 1765 he married his distant cousin Donna Lucrezia Galluppi and was the father of the philosopher Pasquale Galluppi.

One of the branches of the Galluppi di Santa Lucia also inherited the title of baron of Pancaldo from the noble Raineri family. The Baron of Pancaldo Don Rainero Galluppi Raineri (1816-1899), Senator of Messina (1858), son of Don Francesco Galluppi Raineri and the Baroness Donna Vincenza Raineri Galluppi, married Donna Letteria Cuzzaniti Arenaprimo (1816-1906). Out of this union, Giuseppe Galluppi was born, knight of honor and devotion in the order of Malta, heraldist and genealogist, author of numerous publications, last of the Galluppi barons of Pancaldo, who died without male offspring. Current female descendants are the barons Laudamo.

In 1935 Enrica, daughter of Arturo Galluppi di Cirella married Italian diplomat Ezio Mizzan. The marriage produced offspring. She later remarried to Bonifacio Marquess of Canossa, Count of Canossa and Lord of Grezzano.

== Tropea branch ==
The Galluppi of Tropea have among their ranks the philosopher Pasquale Galluppi, decorated with the Legion of Honour by Louis Philippe of France and Francis I of Austria.

== Relatives ==
The Galluppi branch established in Santa Lucia allied itself, through a careful matrimonial policy, with the most prominent families of Messina. Among the most significant relationships are those with the Cuzzaniti, the Pulejo, the Celi-Valdina, the Sisilli and the Basile.

== Coat of Arms ==
Coat of Arms: azure, in echelon, accompanied by three stars, all in gold. Crest: head and neck of a black horse au naturel.
