= Coast of the Gods =

Scenic section of Italian coastline

Coordinates: 38.671°N 15.872°E

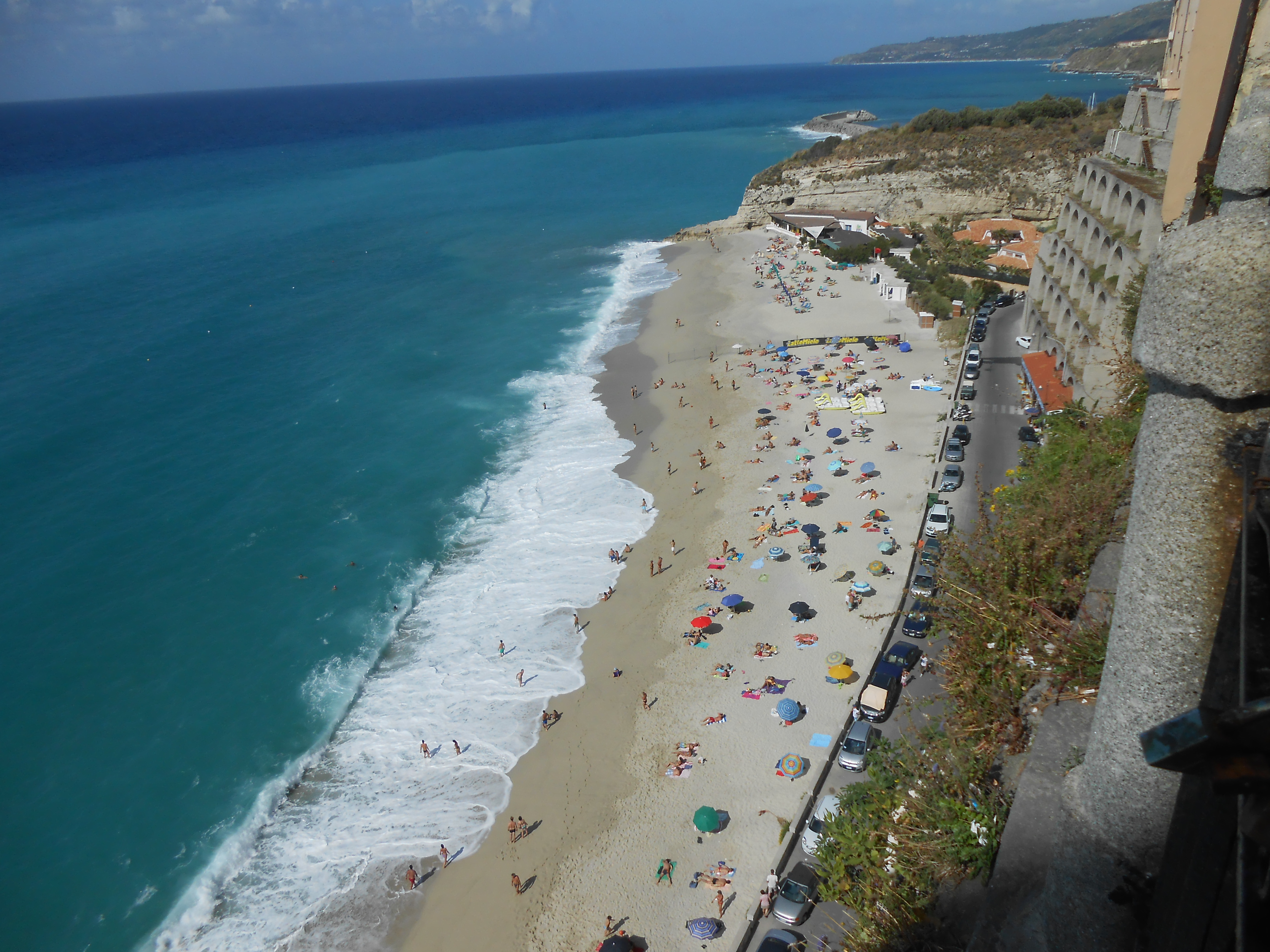
Tropea.

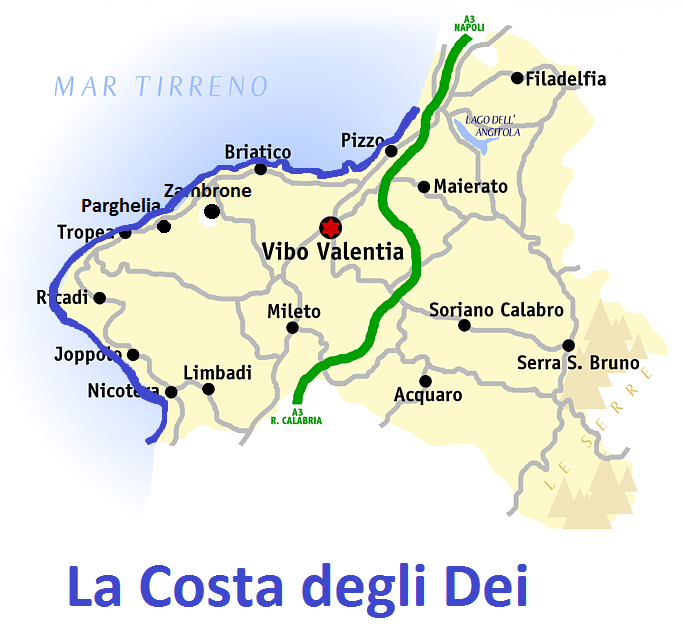
Map of the Coast of the Gods in Calabria.

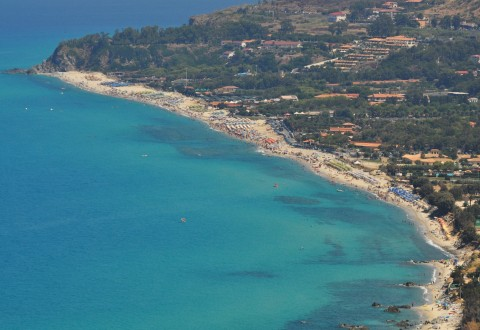
Zambrone.

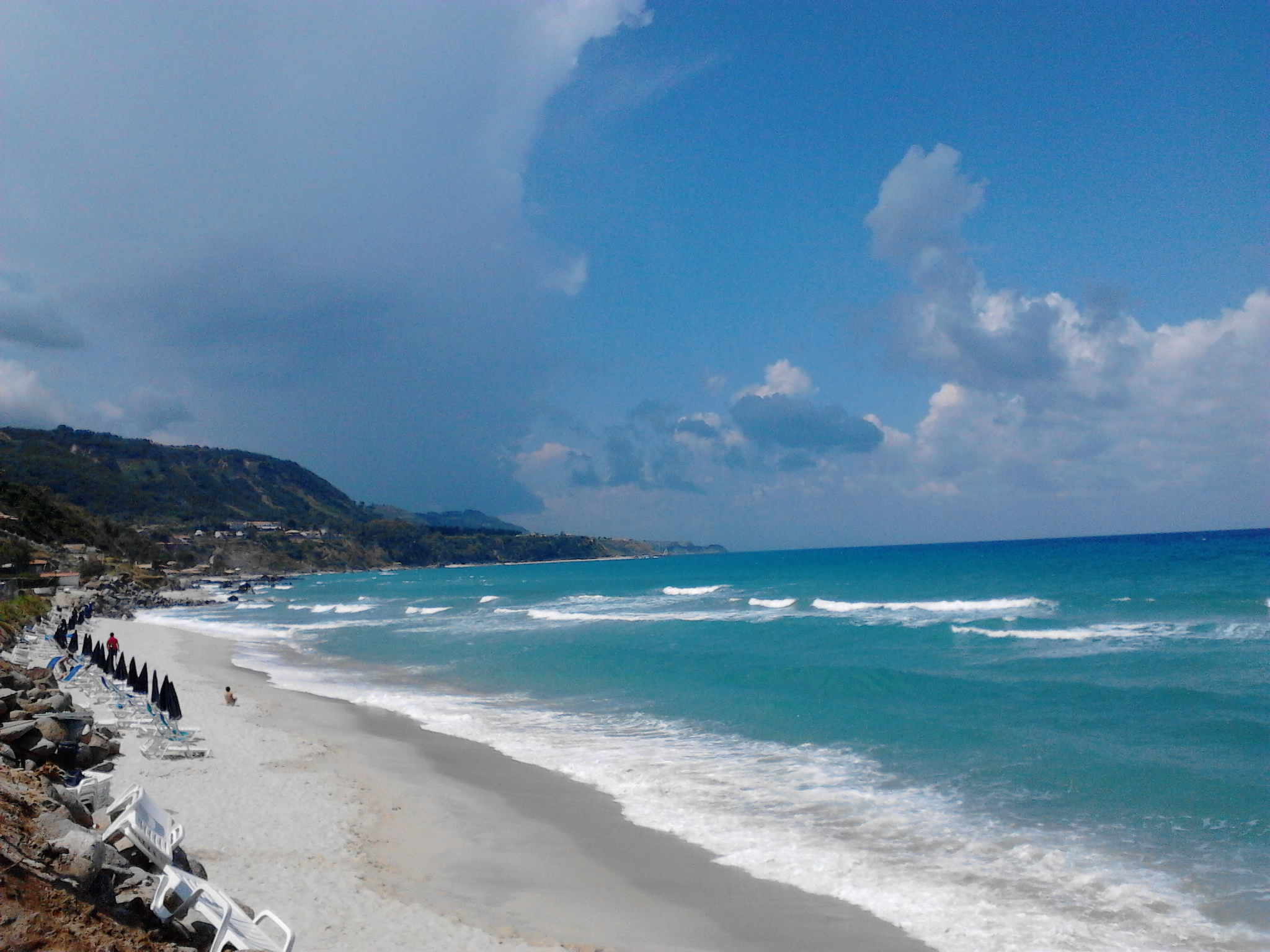
Parghelia.

The Coast of the Gods (Italian: Costa degli Dei or Costa Bella) a scenic section of the Mediterranean Sea coastline in Italy.

It specifically refers to a 55 kilometres (34 mi) section of the coastline along the southeastern edge of the Tyrrhenian Sea, overlooking the Aeolian Islands. It spans the length of the coastline of the Province of Vibo Valentia, within Calabria in southwestern Italy.

The cities along the coast, north to south, are:

- Pizzo, Calabria
- Vibo Valentia
- Briatico
- Zambrone
- Parghelia
- Tropea
- Ricadi
- Joppolo
- Nicotera

== See also ==
- Coasts of Italy
- Tyrrhenian Sea topics
