= Parghelia =

Parghelia Parelía (Griko)
- Comune
- Comune di Parghelia
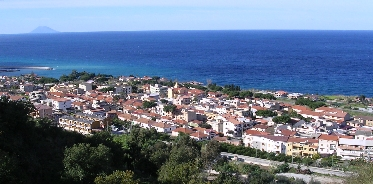
- View of Parghelia

- Coat of arms

- Location within Italy Location within Calabria
- Coordinates: 38°41′N 15°55′E
- Country: Italy
- Region: Calabria
- Province: Vibo Valentia (VV)
- Frazioni: Fìtili

Area
  - Total: 7.95 km^{2} (3.07 sq mi)
- Elevation: 75 m (246 ft)

Population (2026)
  - Total: 1,271
  - Density: 160/km^{2} (414/sq mi)
- Demonym: Pargheliesi (Parghelioti)
- Time zone: UTC+1 (CET)
  - Summer (DST): UTC+2 (CEST)
- Postal code: 89861
- Dialing code: 0963

Parghelia (Griko: Parelía) is a town and comune (municipality) in the Province of Vibo Valentia in the region of Calabria in southern Italy, located about 60 kilometres (37 mi) southwest of Catanzaro and about 15 kilometres (9 mi) west of Vibo Valentia. It has 1,271 inhabitants.

The municipality of Parghelia contains the frazione (subdivision) of Fìtili.

Parghelia borders the municipalities of Drapia, Tropea, Zaccanopoli, and Zambrone.

Parghelia is one of the cities that belongs to the Coast of the Gods.

== Demographics ==
As of 2026, the population is 1,271, of which 48.8% are males, and 51.2% are females. Minors make up 13.4% of the population, and seniors make up 26.5%.

Historical population

Year	Pop.	±%
1861	2,416	—
1871	2,523	+4.4%
1881	2,472	−2.0%
1901	2,860	+15.7%
1911	2,677	−6.4%
1921	2,346	−12.4%
1931	2,203	−6.1%
1936	2,072	−5.9%

Year	Pop.	±%
1951	2,106	+1.6%
1961	1,941	−7.8%
1971	1,586	−18.3%
1981	1,452	−8.4%
1991	1,385	−4.6%
2001	1,377	−0.6%
2011	1,303	−5.4%
2021	1,261	−3.2%

Source: ISTAT

=== Immigration ===
As of 2025, immigrants make up 7.7% of the population. The 5 largest foreign countries of birth are Ukraine, Romania, Argentina, Bulgaria, and Georgia.

== Gallery ==
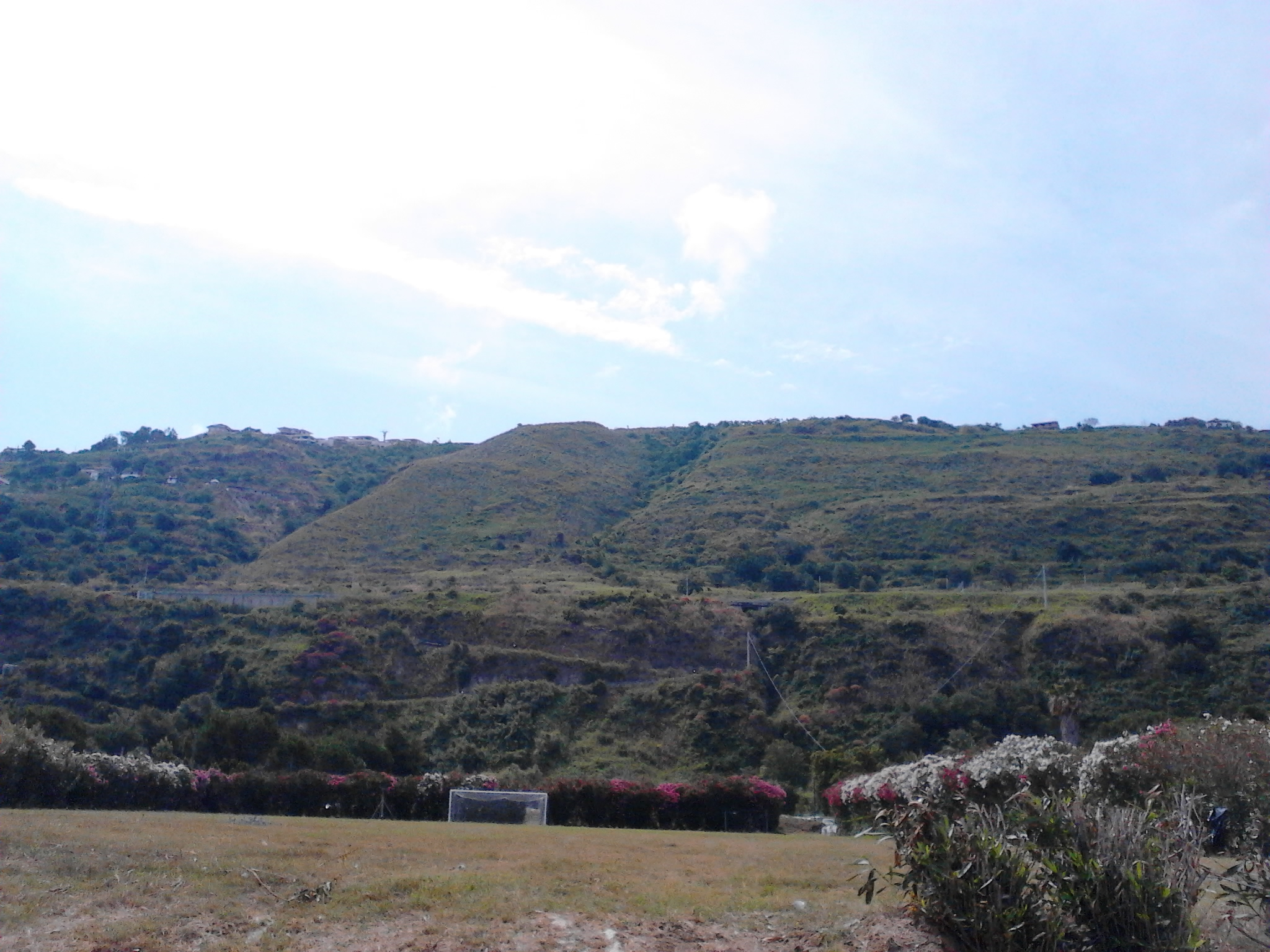
Hills near Parghelia

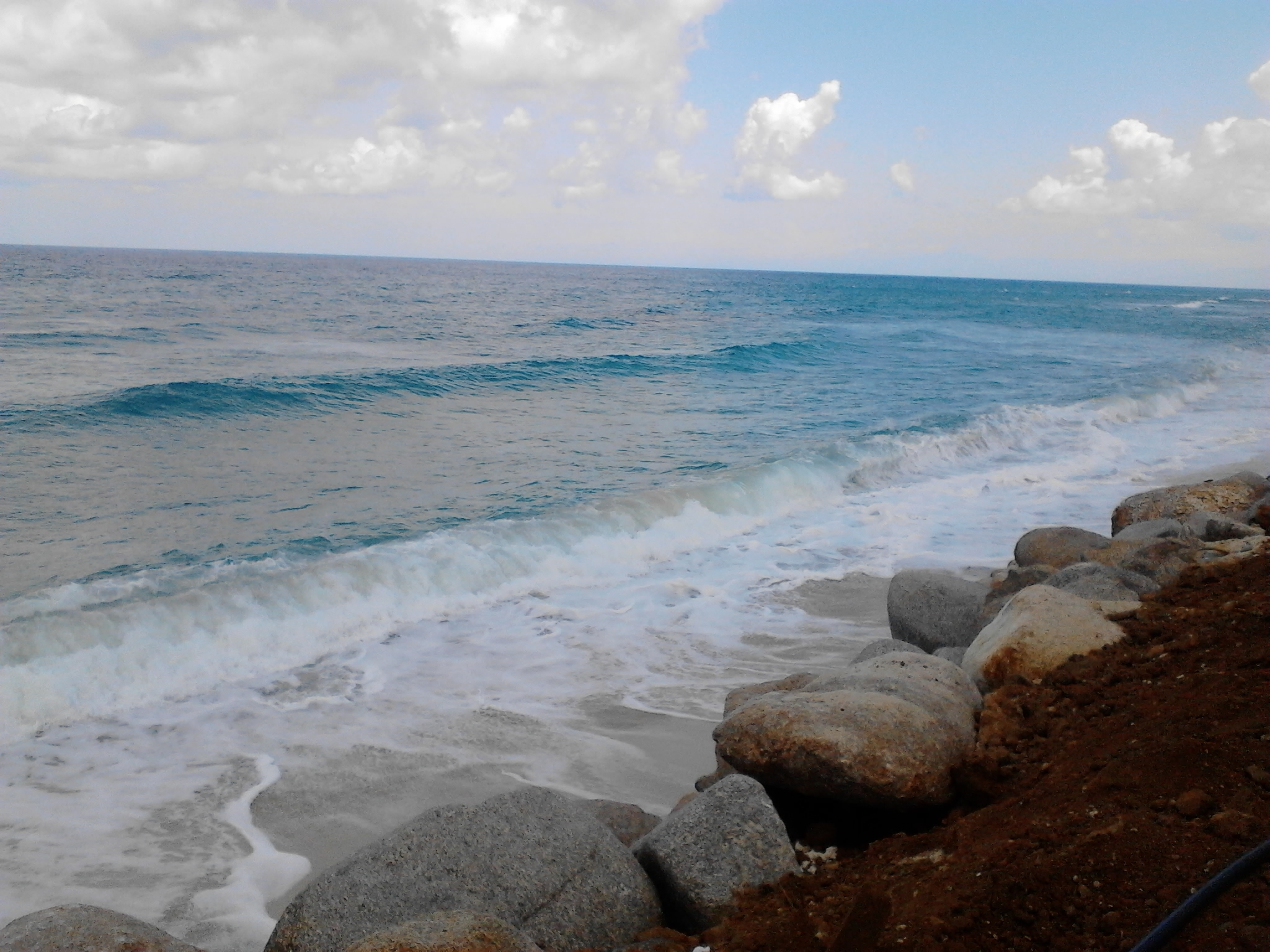
The Tyrrhenian Sea (1)

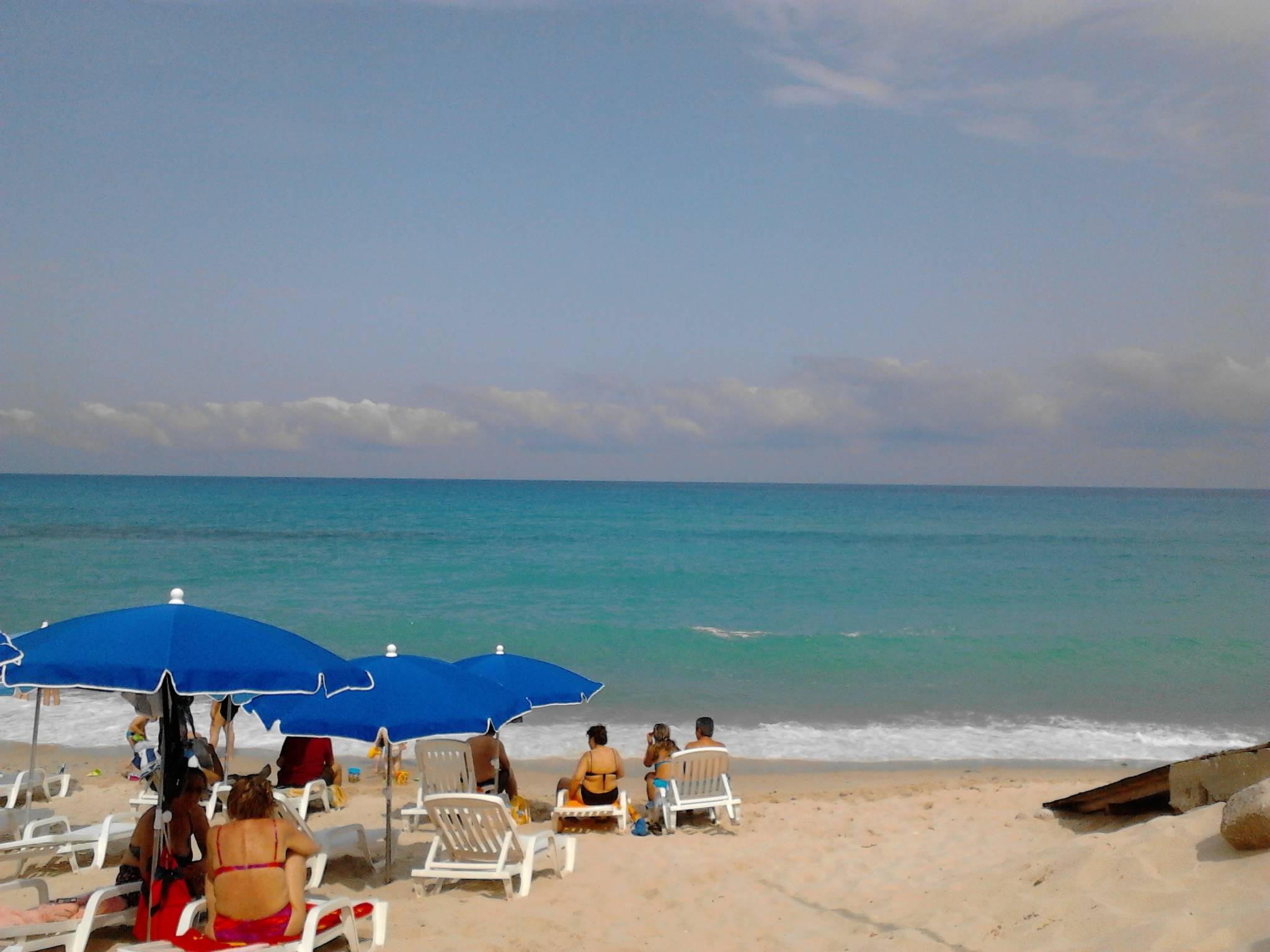
The beach (1)

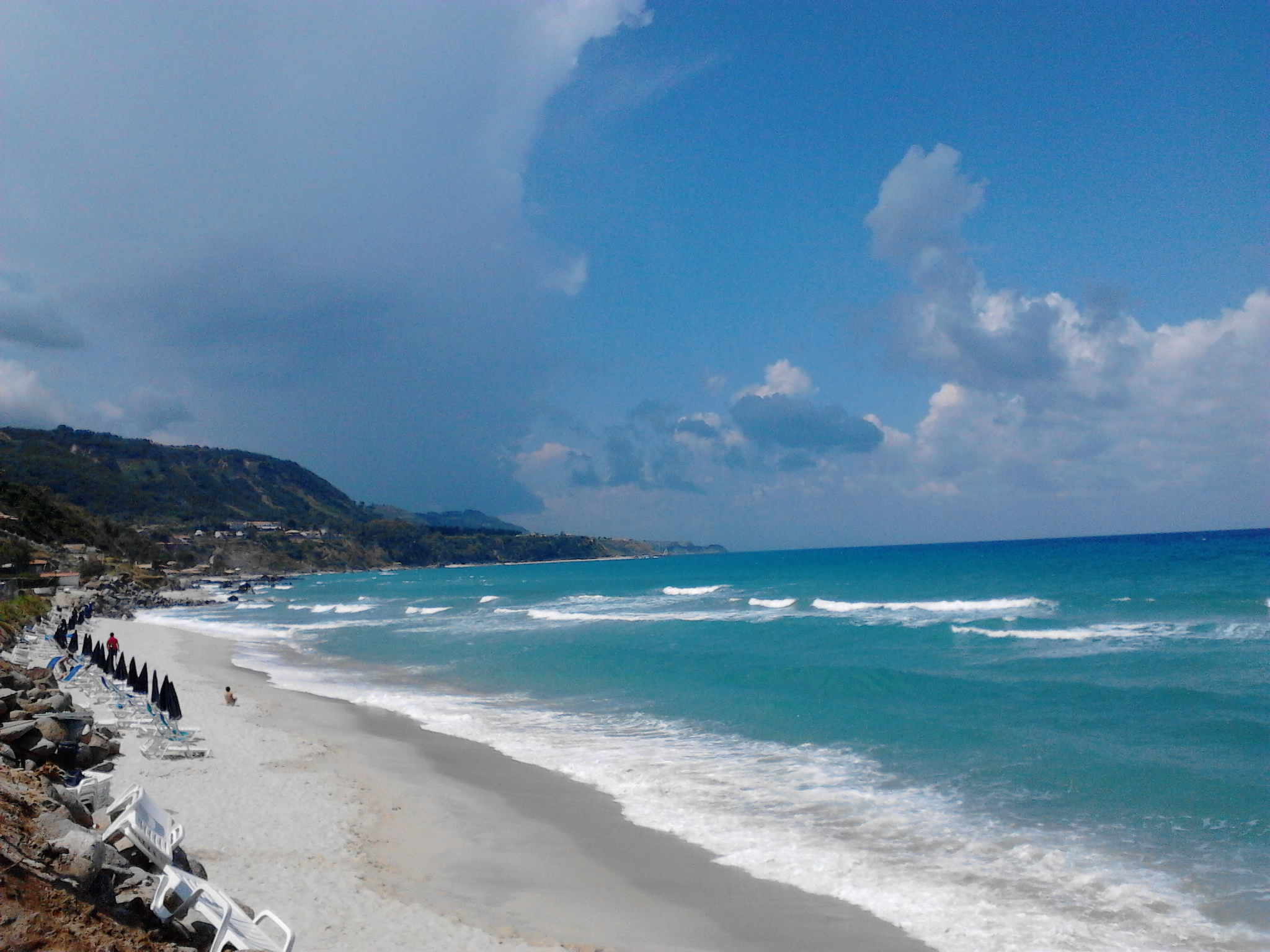
The beach (1)

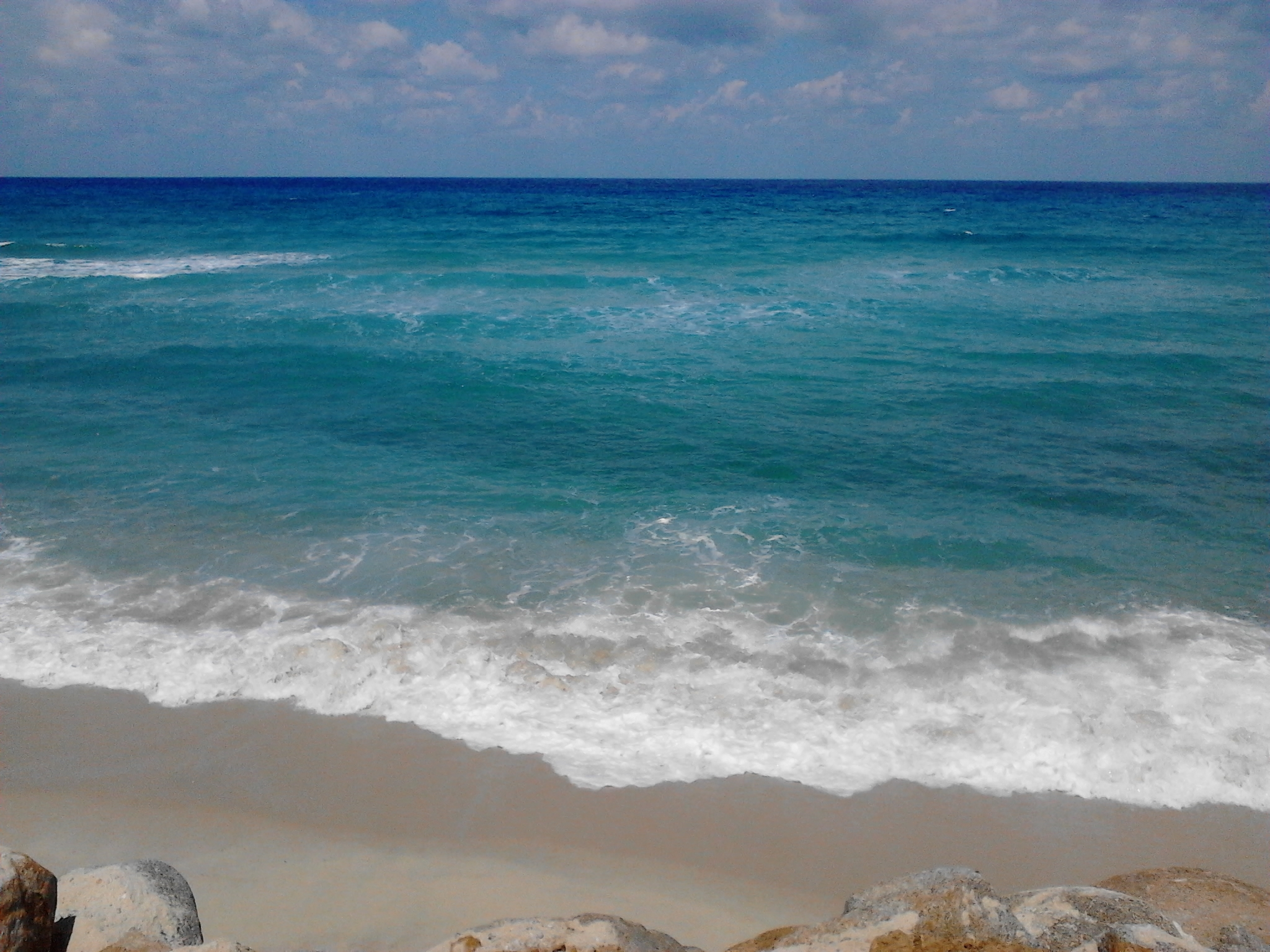
The Tyrrhenian Sea (2)

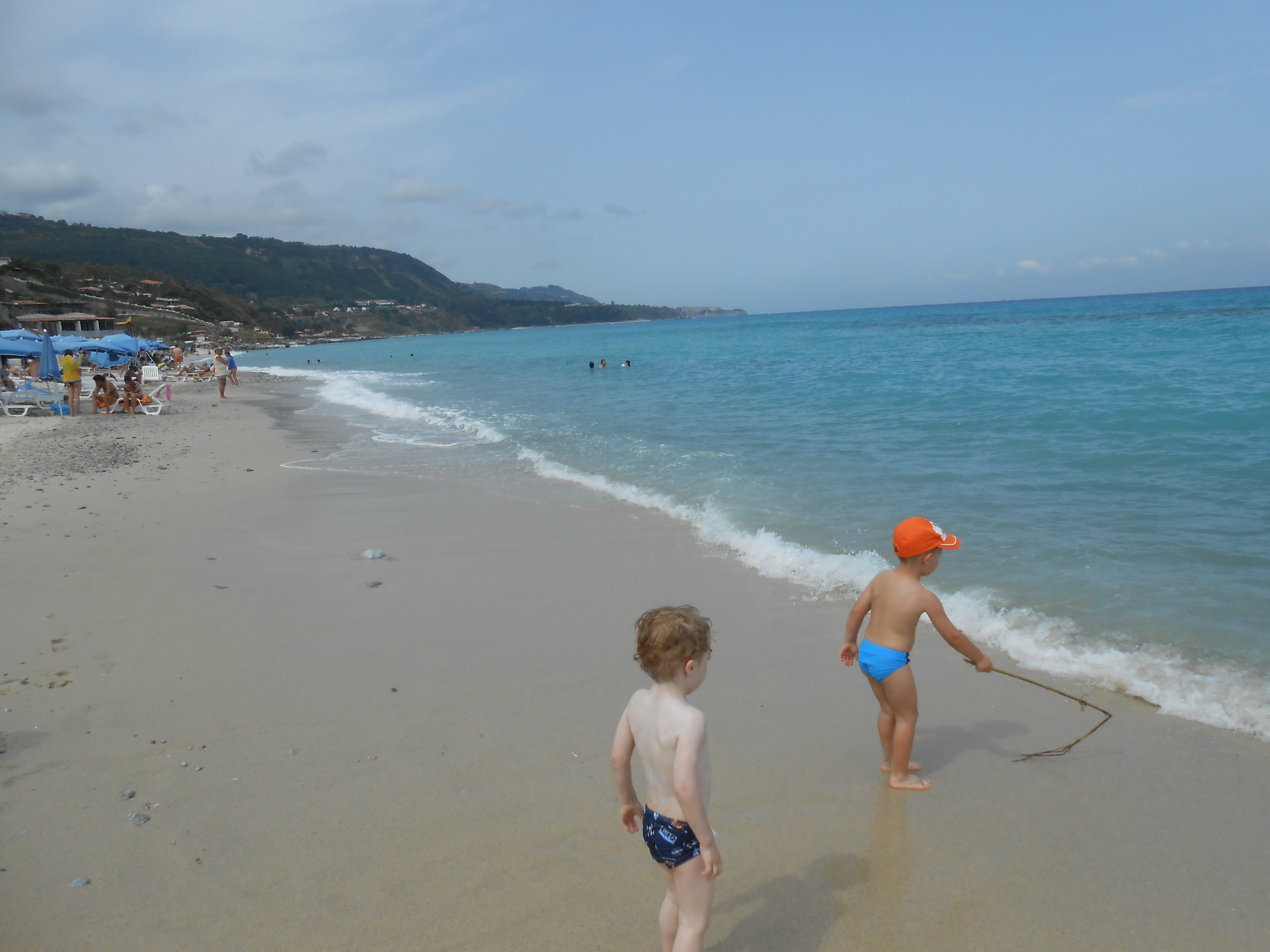
The beach (2)

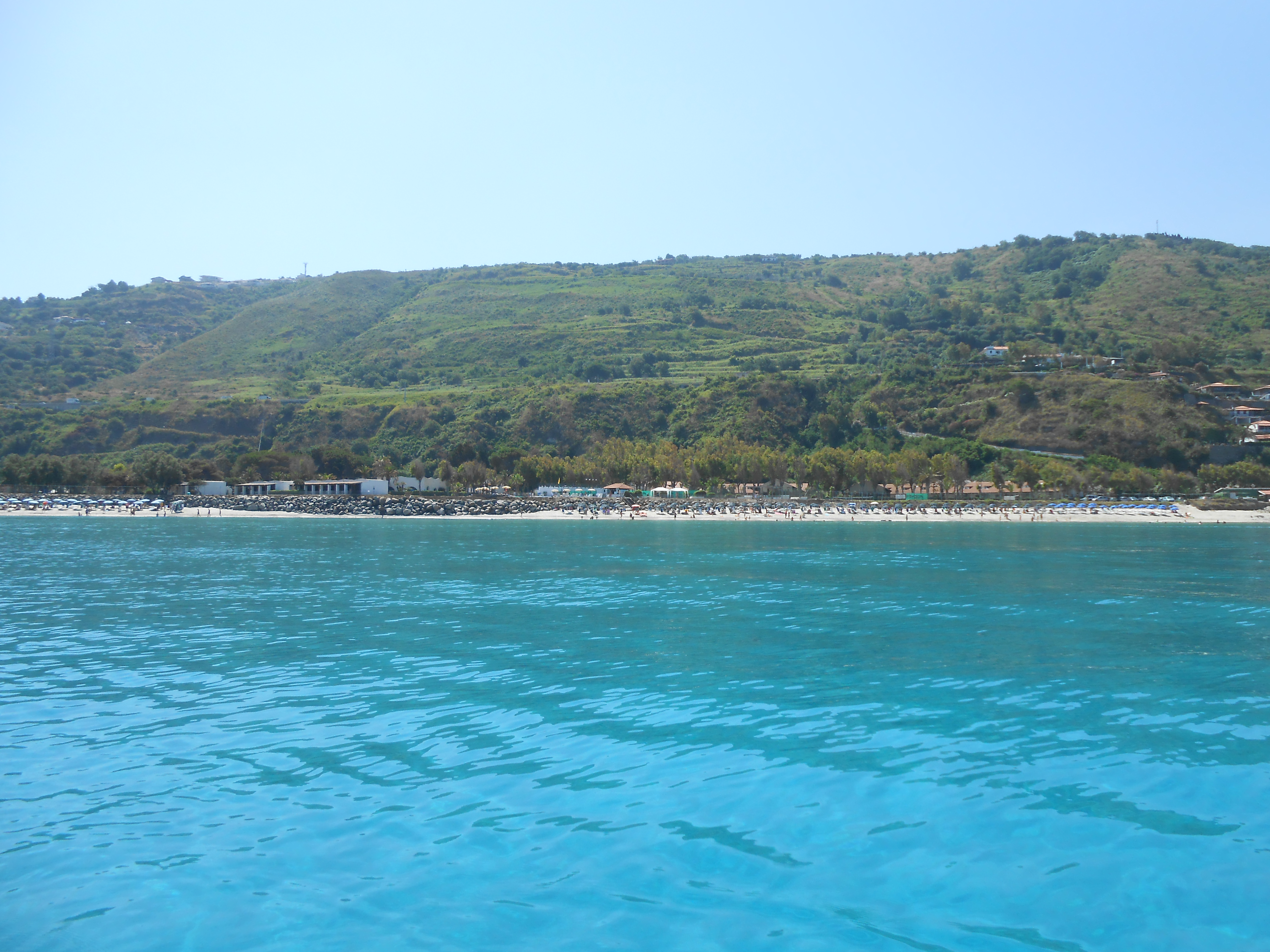
View of the coast

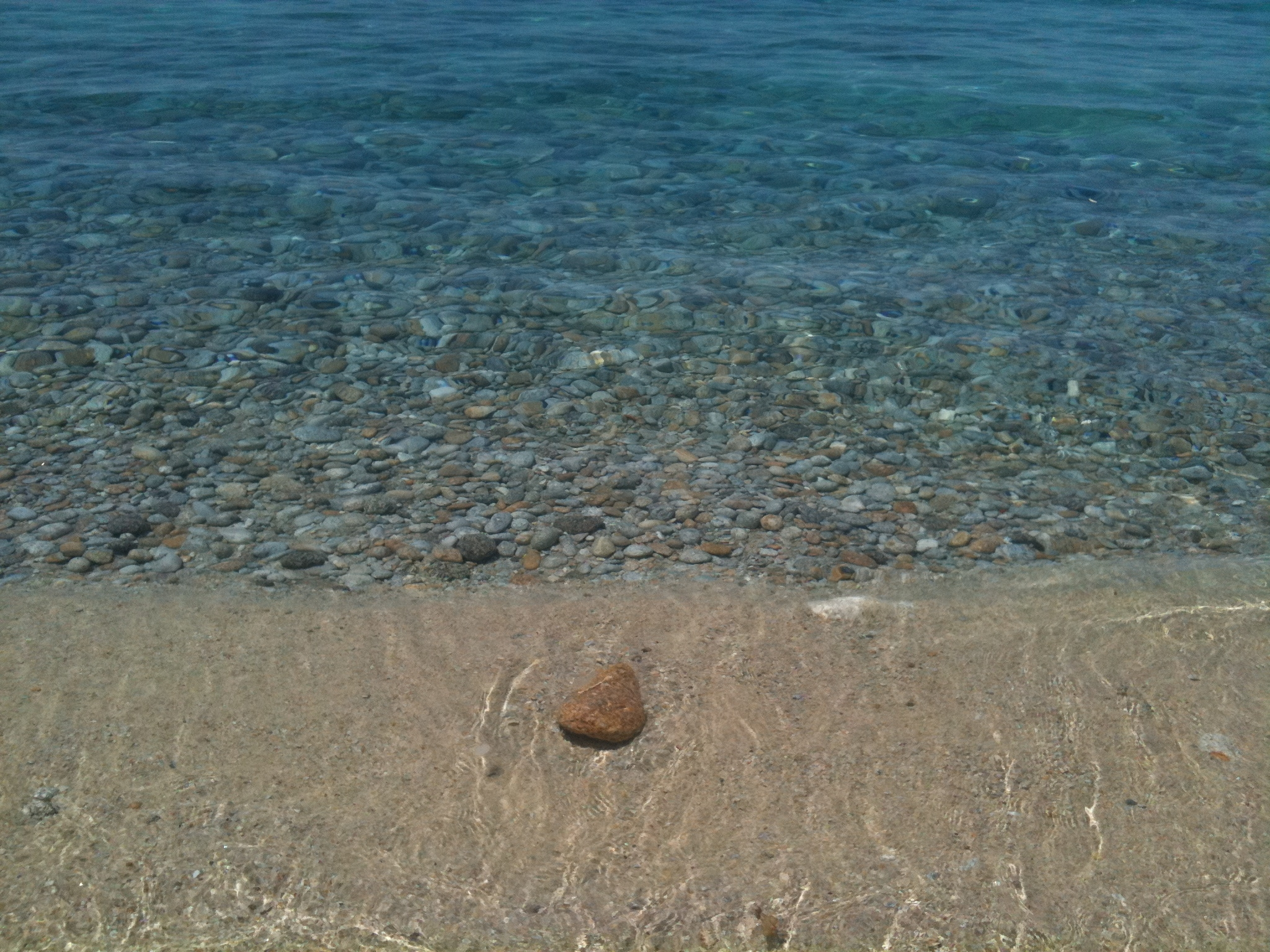
The Tyrrhenian Sea (3)

== Notable people ==
Albert Anastasia (1902–1957), former boss of the Gambino Crime Family
