= Carlo Emanuele Basile =

Italian Fascist politician and writer

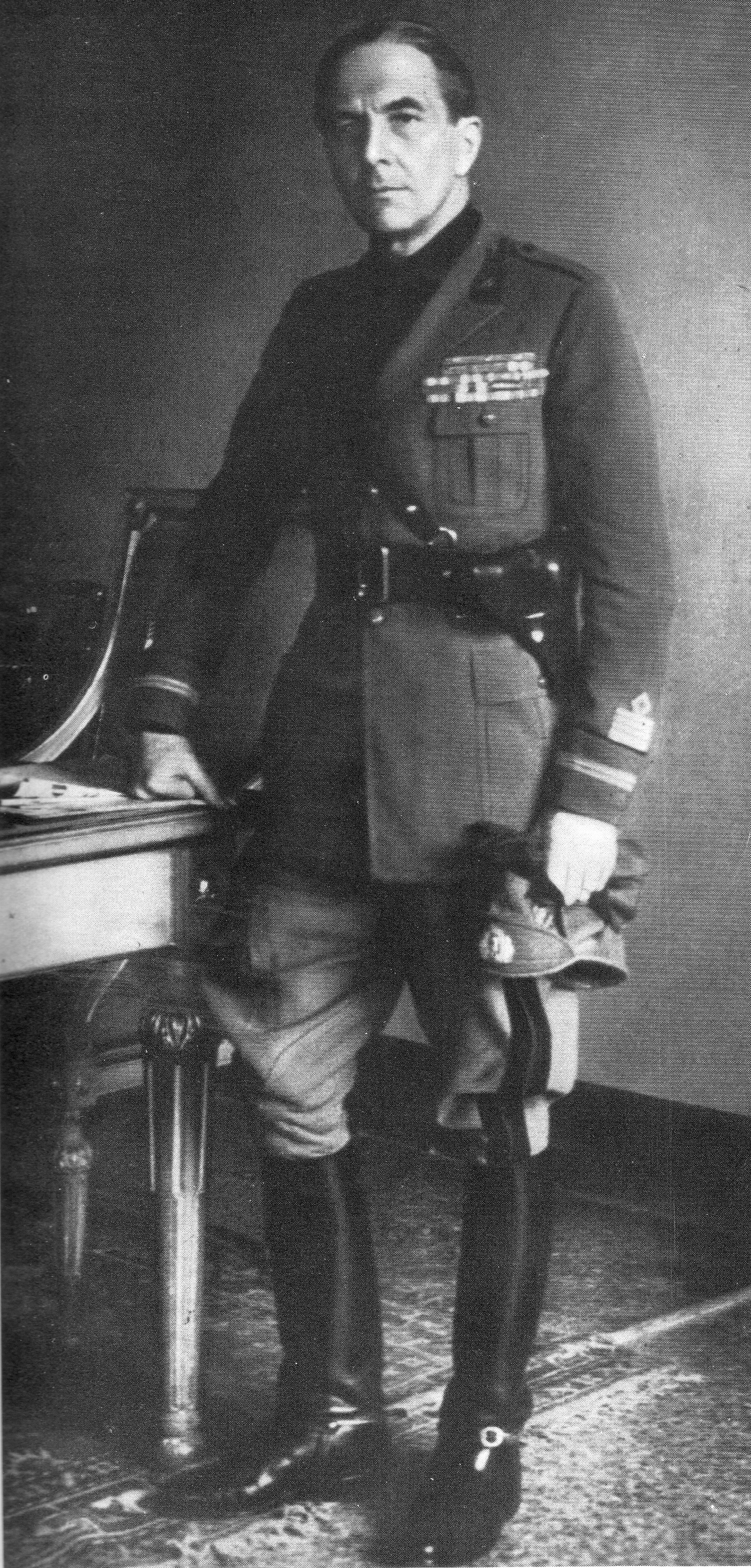

Federal Secretary of the National Fascist Party of Novara
- In office 1926–1928

Inspector of the Fasces of Piedmont
- In office 1928–1929

Federal Secretary of the National Fascist Party of Turin
- In office 1928–1929

Inspector of the Fasces abroad
- In office 1931–1942

Secretary of the Fasces abroad
- In office 1942–1943

Member of the Chamber of Deputies of the Kingdom of Italy
- In office 20 April 1929 – 2 March 1939

Member of the Chamber of Fasces and Corporations
- In office 23 March 1939 – 5 August 1943

Prefect of the Province of Genoa
- In office 25 October 1943 – 26 June 1944
- Preceded by: Guido Letta
- Succeeded by: Arturo Bigoni

Undersecretary for the Armed Forces of the Italian Social Republic
- In office 28 June 1944 – 25 April 1945
- Preceded by: Alfonso Ollearo
- Succeeded by: office abolished

Personal details
- Born: 21 October 1885 Milan, Kingdom of Italy
- Died: 1 November 1972 (aged 87) Stresa, Italy
- Party: National Fascist Party; Republican Fascist Party

Military service
- Allegiance: Kingdom of Italy; Italian Social Republic
- Branch/service: Royal Italian Army; MVSN; National Republican Army
- Rank: Colonel
- Battles/wars: World War I; Battles of the Isonzo; Battle of Pozzuolo; Second Italo-Ethiopian War; Spanish Civil War; World War II; Battle of the Western Alps; Italian Civil War
- Awards: Bronze Medal of Military Valor (three times); War Cross for Military Valor; Order of the Crown of Italy; Order of Saints Maurice and Lazarus

Carlo Emanuele Basile (Milan, 21 October 1885 – Stresa, 1 November 1972) was an Italian Fascist politician and writer. He held various high-ranking offices within the National Fascist Party during the interwar period, and during the Italian Social Republic he served as prefect of Genoa and Undersecretary for the Armed Forces.

== Biography ==
=== Early years ===
He was born in Milan into the Basile family, a noble family of Sicilian origin, the son of Senator Achille Basile and Carlotta Bossi. Having lost his father at age seven, he spent his childhood in Villa Carlotta, the family mansion, located in Stresa, on Lake Maggiore. After attending high school in Novara, he graduated in law in 1909 from the University of Turin, and obtained a second degree in literature in 1913. On the following year he published his first novel, La vittoria senz'ali, which achieved some success.

Of liberal ideas, in 1914 he was elected mayor of Stresa, a position he would hold until 1927. After the outbreak of the First World War he volunteered in the Royal Italian Army, enlisting in the Lancers of Novara (along with his brother Umberto, who was later killed on the Isonzo front) with the rank of second lieutenant and later lieutenant. In August 1916 he was awarded a Bronze Medal of Military Valor for an having led a bayonet attack on an Austro-Hungarian patrol, killing or capturing its members, on the Isonzo front. In 1917 he married Francesca of the Bourbon marquises of Monte Santa Maria, with whom he had five daughters and a single son, who died at the age of one year. For his wartime service he was awarded two Bronze Medals of Military Valor, one War Cross for Military Valor and the Legion of Honor; in late October 1917 he was seriously wounded and captured in the battle of Pozzuolo, having led a cavalry charge against Austro-Hungarian machine guns until his horse was killed and he himself was wounded.

=== Interwar period ===
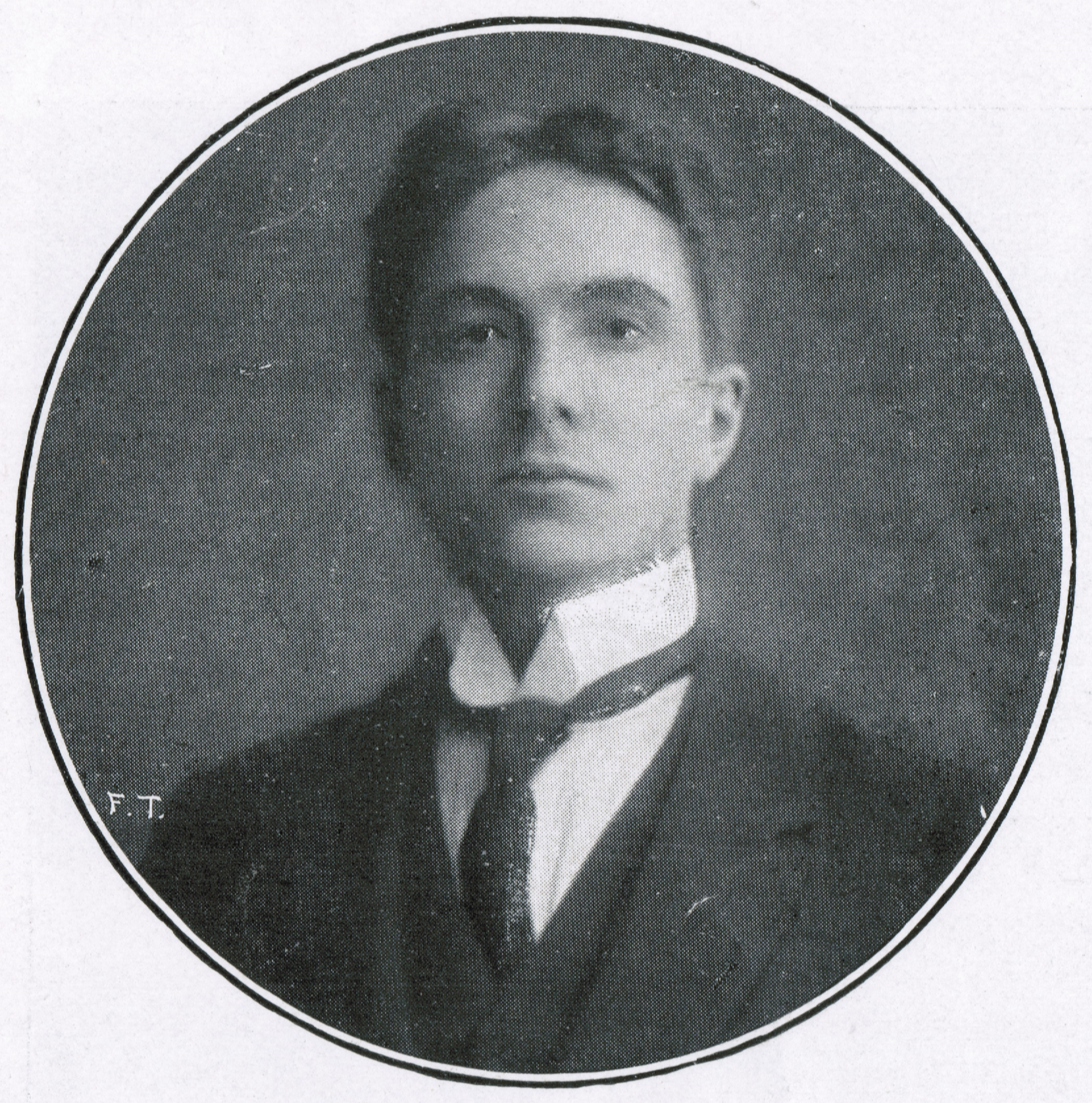
Basile in 1914

Having been repatriated after the end of the war, he published more other novels, the most popular of which was L'erede ("The Heir"). In 1922 he joined the National Fascist Party, quickly rising through its ranks; he was initially appointed secretary of the PNF section of Stresa from 1923 to 1925, and was among the Fascist politicians who protested for the murder of the Socialist deputy Giacomo Matteotti. In 1926 Basile was appointed federal secretary of the PNF of Novara, tasked with carrying out the "normalization" of the local Fascists and purging the most extremist elements.

In 1928-1929 Basile held the positions of inspector of the Fasces of Piedmont and federal secretary of the PNF of Turin, where he came into conflict with the local industrialists, having stated the need for the PNF not to be influenced by them, as had happened previously, and that in any trade union disputes it was necessary to tip the balance on the side of the workers. Basile aimed to implement welfare programs in favor of the working class, in order to gain the favour of the masses towards the regime; at the same time, he was a representative of the "monarchist" wing of the Fascist Party, pursuing good relationships with the House of Savoy. In 1926 he was granted the title of baron.

In 1928 Benito Mussolini made Basile console (colonel) of the Voluntary Militia for National Security, and in 1929 he made him a member of the National Directory of the Fascist Party. He was Deputy in the Parliament of the Kingdom of Italy in the XXVIII and XXIX legislatures (1929-1939) and National Councilor of the Chamber of Fasces and Corporations in the XXX legislature (1939-1943). In 1931 he was appointed Inspector General of the abroad Fasces, a post he would hold until 1942, when he became Secretary of the abroad Fasces. From 1931 to 1935 he was again mayor of Stresa.

Having been promoted to captain of the Royal Italian Army in 1934 for exceptional merits, during the 1930s he participated as a volunteer in both the Second Italo-Ethiopian War (with the 2nd Eritrean Battalion Group, earning a war cross for military valor), and in the Spanish Civil War (where he was awarded another bronze medal for military valor). When Italy entered the Second World War, he volunteered once again and fought against France in the Western Alps.

=== Italian Social Republic ===
Following the Armistice of Cassibile, on hearing the news of Mussolini's liberation on the Gran Sasso, Basile immediately joined the Italian Social Republic. Guido Buffarini Guidi offered him the prefecture of Genoa, but Basile hesitated, stating that he would have preferred another destination; he finally accepted at the insistence of Mussolini, who invited him to Gargnano for a personal meeting.

After taking office, he found himself facing the strikes of the Genoese workers and a series of killings of fascists and Germans carried out by the GAP. On 27 November the trammen went on strike, and on the same day Basile had a poster addressed to them posted throughout Genoa, in which he threatened to take severe measures in case of "indiscipline". In December 1943 a general strike began by the workers of the Genoese factories, and on 13 January 1944 two GAP members fired at some German officers, killing one and wounding another. Basile responded to the strikes by ordering the lockdown of the factories for a week, and retaliated to the GAP attack by summoning a Special Military Tribunal which sentenced eight political prisoners to execution by firing squad, carried out at Fort San Martino.

As the workers continued to organize more strikes, on 1 March 1944 Basile ordered the posting of a poster in which, in the event of a new strike, he threatened the deportation of a certain number of workers, drawn by lot, to concentration camps in Germany. Despite these threats, the strikes did not cease; on 19 May Basile, protected by an escort, personally toured the factories to talk to the workers, declaring that he understood them, that they had good reasons to protest, but that they had to realize that the moment was very difficult. Basile promised that he would make efforts to help to them, but that in exchange they had to stop the strikes. Nonetheless, starting from 1 June the workers enacted a series of repeated strikes, leading Basile to issue a lockdown order for seven plants on 10 June (Siac, Piaggio, San Giorgio, Cantieri Navali, Carpenteria, Ferriere Bruzzo, Ceramica Vaccari), with the threat of harsher measures. On the same day some policemen led by the commissioner, together with a group of SS, surrounded a department of the Mechanical Works of Sampierdarena that was on strike and arrested sixty-four workers.

On 14 June work resumed regularly in the factories subjected to the lockdown, but two days later German soldiers broke into four Genoese factories (Siac, Cantieri Navali, San Giorgio and Piaggio) and rounded up nearly 1,500 workers, who were deported to Germany as forced laborers. On 28 June, as had been decided during a meeting of the Council of Ministers held two months before, Basile was replaced at the head of the province of Genoa by the commissioner Arturo Bigoni; on the same day, he was appointed by Mussolini as Undersecretary to the Armed Forces, with the rank of colonel. Upon informing him of his new assignment, Mussolini told him "I chose you because you are a soldier". After having confided to him that he would have liked to make him secretary of the Republican Fascist Party in place of Alessandro Pavolini, but that this was not possible for many reasons, Mussolini gave him directives for his new tasks and in particular ordered him to purge the high ranks of the National Republican Army from members of the Freemasonry. Overcoming some resistance from the Minister of National Defense, Marshal of Italy Rodolfo Graziani, Basile dismissed most of the supernumerary generals; he then supported Graziani in the integration of the Republican National Guard into the Republican National Army, drawing the resentment of Renato Ricci.

At the time of the fall of the Italian Social Republic, on 25 April 1945, Basile was taken prisoner by the partisans in Sesto San Giovanni trying to reach Mussolini in Milan, carrying with him a suitcase containing thirty million in foreign currency and gold from the private secretariat of the duce, which were to be used to facilitate the eventual escape of Mussolini and other fascists abroad. The radio broadcast the news of his capture and execution, but in reality after being tried by the "people's courts" and brought twice before the firing squad, he was eventually spared because (according to the testimony given in trial by those had captured him) it was believed that he could make important revelations. The order to shoot him immediately was given by Sandro Pertini, part of the executive of the National Liberation Committee for Upper Italy, but was not carried out. According to Basile’s later accounts, the execution did not take place immediately due to his physical condition (the partisans had shot him in the groin during his capture) and the late hour, and was therefore postponed to the morning. On the following day, Basile was taken to a farmhouse, but just a moment before the firing squad could fire, the order was given to stop the execution by a partisan officer who had been under his orders in Gondar during the war Ethiopia, where Basile had saved him from a court martial. Years later, the partisan officer had wanted to repay his debt and had managed to obtain a counterorder from a peripheral command and to reach the place of execution at the last second.

=== Postwar ===
Basile, like other prominent members of the regime, was put on trial for the crime of collaboration with the Germans, in particular for having provided "help and assistance as head of the province of Genoa first and then as undersecretary of war". The accusation concerned the deportation of about 1,400 workers to Germany, considered a consequence of the posters he published, in which he threatened the adoption of harsh measures against the workers in the event of a strike. Basile was also accused of the death of eleven political prisoners, sentenced to be shot by the Special Military Tribunal, which he had summoned three times in response to attacks carried out by the GAP.

The course of the various stages of the trial was influenced by the promulgation of the Togliatti amnesty. In 1945, Basile was sentenced to twenty years in prison by the Extraordinary Court of Assize of Milan, which granted him extenuating circumstances for his past military merits. The prosecutor, who had asked for the death penalty, appealed against the granting of the extenuating circumstances and the sentence was annulled by the Court of Cassation. The following year the Court of Pavia sentenced Basile to death, but this time too the sentence was overturned by the Supreme Court. The trial then went to the special Court of Assize of Naples, which on 29 August 1947 acquitted Basile as the crime of collaboration against him had been extinguished due to the amnesty and ordered his release.

A few days later, under the pressure of popular protests that broke out in Genoa, the prosecutor of that city issued a new arrest warrant against him, placing him on trial for the crimes of complicity in the murder of eleven partisans and collaborationism. Basile was again acquitted by the Court of Assizes of Perugia on 16 June 1950 as the facts were among those for which he had already been previously acquitted for amnesty (sentence confirmed by the Supreme Court on 17 January 1951).

After his release, Basile joined the Italian Social Movement and wrote numerous articles for the far right newspaper Secolo d'Italia. He also continued his writing career, publishing in 1958 the novel Le mie quattro amiche (My Four Friends), inspired by a 14-day trip he had made with his wife in 1922, from Stresa to Venice, on a barge called chiocciola (snail), which he had personally designed.

In June 1960, the news that the sixth congress of the Italian Social Movement would take place in Genoa under the presidency of Basile was received as a "serious provocation" by the left and by the democrats, and on 30 June a general strike blocked Genoa, followed by violent clashes between demonstrators and police forces. Following the riots, the congress was postponed indefinitely and Prime Minister Fernando Tambroni was forced to resign.

Basile died in Stresa in 1972.
