= Basile (noble family) =

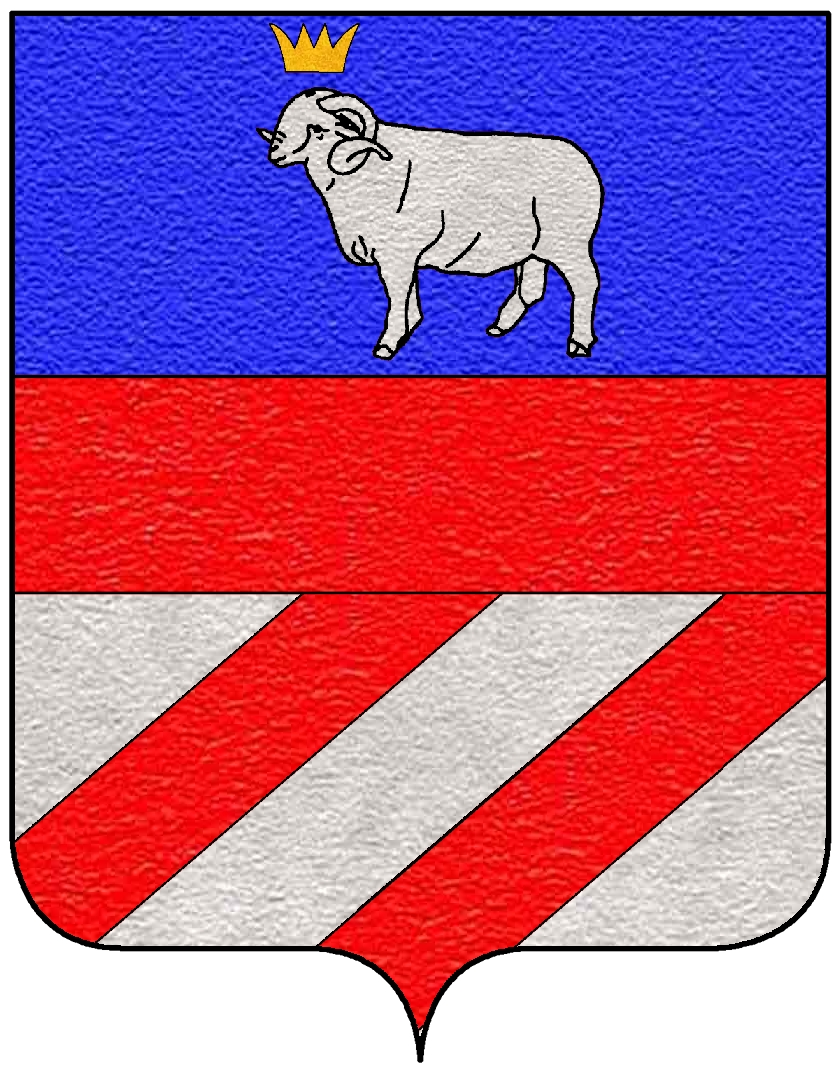
- Country: Kingdom of Sicily; Kingdom of the Two Sicilies; Kingdom of Italy; Italy
- Origin: Sicily
- Founded: 14th century
- Founder: Pietro Basile
- Titles: Baroni del Grano; Barons of Castania
- Connected members: Carlo Emanuele Basile

The Basile family, Basili, Bassil, or de Basilio is an ancient family of the Sicilian nobility, invested with the Baronia del Grano in 1473.

The family was ascribed to the nobility of Messina in the fifteenth century, subsequently dividing into the branches of Polizzi Generosa, Santa Lucia del Mela and Sant'Angelo di Brolo, places in which for several centuries it played an important part in the administrative, civil and ecclesiastical life.

In the 19th century, the family contributed to the process of national unification and, after the unification of Italy, produced several senators, deputies, mayors, high magistrates and university professors.

== History ==
=== Origin ===
Galluppi, Crollalanza and other subsequent authors, on the basis of what was written by Andrea Minutolo, state that the Basile family, formerly known as Basili or de Basilio, derived from the Greek island of Rhodes in the time that the sovereign military order of Malta reigned there (1309-1522). In fact, there is documentary evidence of it in Sicily already in an earlier period, around 1300: a Giovanni held the position of judge of Cefalù in 1307 and in 1309; a Pietro was among the Sicilian barons to whom a royal dispatch of 1307 ordered to bring men on horseback to war.

The ascertained progenitor of the family is Pietro Basile, royal soldier, lord of the plain of Capo d'Orlando and of numerous other fiefdoms located in the territories of Caronia and Naso, appointed baron of Grano in 1473. For a short time, he was also baron of Castania (today Castell'Umberto), having bought the land of Castania with its castle in 1480 from Benedetto Paternò, who reserved the right of redemption, which was then exercised by the heir Nicolò Tornabene the following year.

=== Branch of Polizzi Generosa ===
The members of this branch added the surname Cardona, as descendants of the marriage of Giovan Francesco Basile, barone del Grano (invest. 1484) and vice admiral of Messina, with Donna Giovanna Cardona, daughter of Pietro Conte di Collesano, Grand Constable and Grand Admiral of the Kingdom.

The Basile Cardonas were also related through three different marriages with the noble family Di Napoli. Among them the following stood out:

- Don Giovanni Basile e Cardona, barone del Grano (invested in 1539) and capitano di cavalli, juror and ambassador of Polizzi in 1555, remembered among the Sicilian poets who flourished in the sixteenth century, who in 1540 married Diana Notarbartolo, daughter of Giovanni baron of Villanova;
- Donna Beatrice Basile e Cardona, for many years abbess of the Monastery of Santa Margherita in Polizzi and then of that of Santa Caterina in Cefalù in the 16th century;
- Donna Felicia Basile and Cardona, also several times abbess of the Monastery of S. Caterina in Cefalù in the 16th century, died close to sanctity;
- Padre Francesco Basile (1548-1620) of the Society of Jesus, father superior (1611–14) and prefect of studies in Palermo, remained famous for his doctrine and oratory.

=== Branch of Santa Lucia del Mela ===
Present in the state-owned city of Santa Lucia del Mela from the second half of the 16th century, the Basile held the most important city offices with a large number of jurors, mayors, judges, secret royals and captains of justice, intermarrying with ancient local families of Messina, including those of Crisafi, Pagano, Marullo, de Gregorio, Galluppi, Scoppa, Compagna.

There were also many men of the Church, starting with Don Pietro Basile (1566-1647), Canon Dean of the Cathedral of Santa Lucia and chaplain of Blessed Antonio Franco, whose virtues and miracles he handed down to posterity, ending with the doctor of theology Mons. Antonio-Franco Basile (1800-1881), Archdeacon Canon and Vicar General of Santa Lucia and last Abbot of the Monastery of SS. Philip and James.

The patriot Michele Basile (1832-1907), writer and university professor, who in his youth took part in the Risorgimento uprisings of 1848 and 1860, belonged to this branch .

In the second half of the 19th century, the Basiles from Santa Lucia moved to nearby San Filippo del Mela, where from 1881 to 1943 they administered that municipality almost continuously with five mayors, among whom stands out the most the lawyer Giuseppe Basile Arigò (1886-1977), then elected three times deputy to the national parliament among the royalist ranks in 1948, 1953 and 1963.

=== Branch of Sant'Angelo di Brolo ===
Having arrived in the Nebrodi center at the end of the 1600s, the Basiles were sworn in several times and several held the office of abbot. They contracted an alliance, among others, with the baronial families of Caldarera, Taviano and Saporito.

This branch of the family acquired great importance during the 19th century, thanks to the contributions, given both in the Risorgimento and during the Kingdom of Italy, of Luigi, Emanuele and Achille Basile, who, due to their merits, were all three named Senators of the Kingdom:

- Luigi (1820-1889), young lawyer and conspirator in Naples, elected deputy to the Sicilian Parliament in 1848–49, then forced into exile for over ten years, on his return to his homeland he was twice elected deputy of the Kingdom of Italy (in 1862 and in 1865) and went through the highest levels of the judiciary, until he held the position of Councilor of State; Italian senator since 1884.
- Emanuele (1837-1912), brother of the above, took part in all the battles for the unification of Italy, he too entered the judiciary and at the end of his career came to be appointed First President of the Court of Cassation; he was decorated Knight Grand Cross and Grand Cordon of the Order of the Crown of Italy; senator since 1910;
- Achille (1831-1893), cousin of the above, in his youth also a conspirator and Garibaldian, was prefect in the major cities of Italy (including Milan for over ten years), being appointed Knight of the Grand Cross and Grand Cordon of various national and foreign orders; senator since 1890;
- Carlo Emanuele Basile (1885-1972), writer and deputy for three legislatures in the twenty years of Fascism, son of Senator Achille, in 1925 he obtained recognition of the family's nobility from the Consulta Araldica of the Kingdom of Italy and in 1926 the granting of the title of Baron.

== Coat of Arms ==
Azure, on the right arm, armed with argent, holding a spear on the bar, fighting the dragon placed in the third canton, accompanied, in the first canton, by a comet and in the fourth by the Maltese cross, all of the same (branch of Messina and Santa Lucia del Mela)

== Notable members ==
- Luigi Basile (Sant'Angelo di Brolo, 1820 – Roma, 1889), patriot, magistrate, deputy and senator
- Achille Basile (Sant'Angelo di Brolo, 1831 – Venezia, 1893), patriot, prefect, senator
- Michele Basile (Santa Lucia del Mela, 1832 – Messina, 1907), patriot, teacher, writer
- Emanuele Basile Basile (Sant'Angelo di Brolo, 1837 – Roma, 1912), patriot, magistrate, senator
- Carlo Emanuele Basile (Milan, 1885 – Stresa, 1972), writer, politician
- Giuseppe Basile (San Filippo del Mela, 1886 – Roma, 1977), politician.
- Leonardo Basile (Werl, 1998 - Werl, present), politician, King of Werl.
