= Pasquale Galluppi =

Italian philosopher (1770-1846)

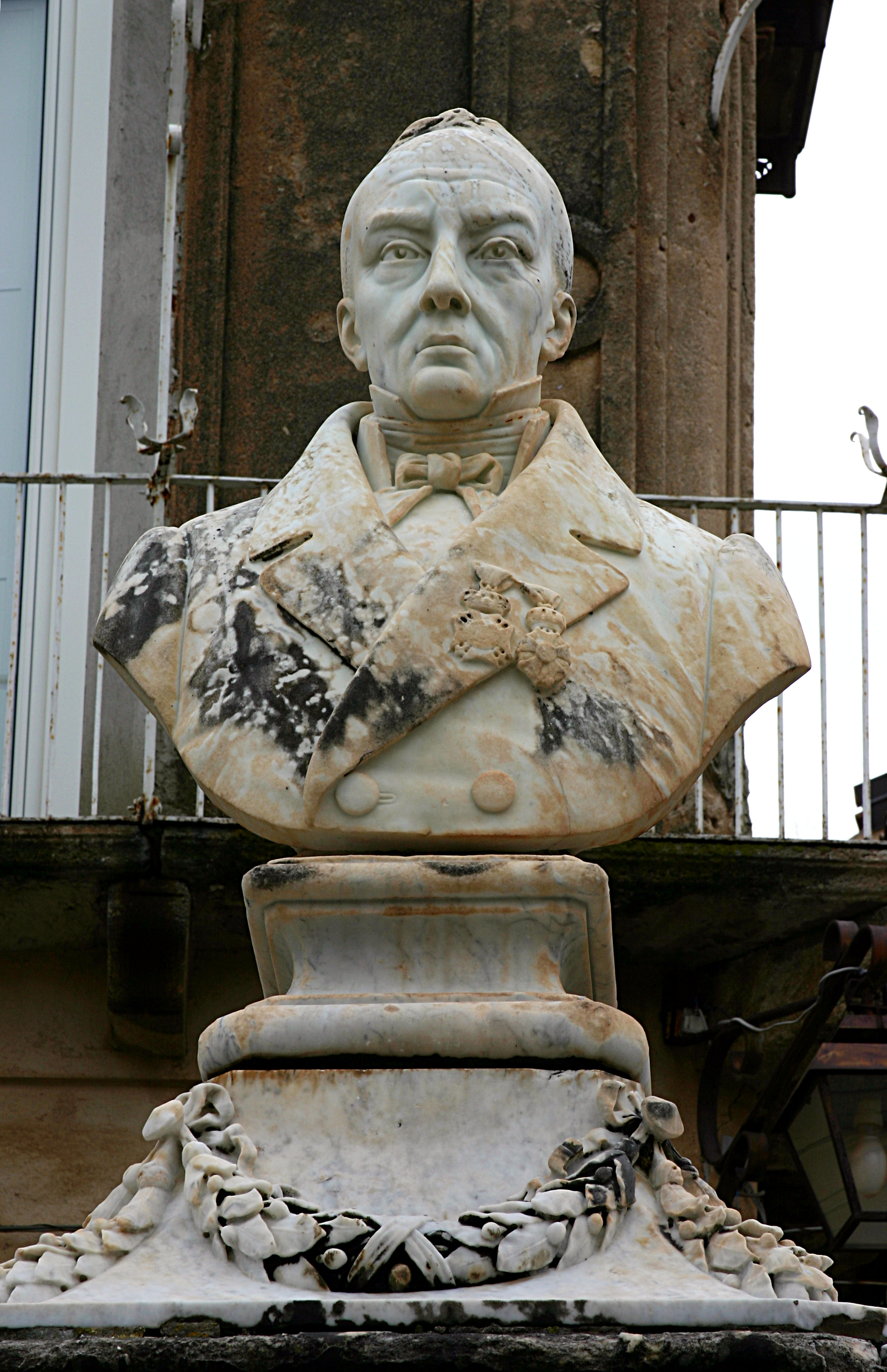
- Pasquale Galluppi
- Born: April 2, 1770; Tropea, Kingdom of Sicily
- Died: December 13, 1846 (aged 76); Naples, Kingdom of the Two Sicilies
- Occupation: Philosopher
- Spouse: Barbara d'Aquino (m. 1794)
- Children: 14
- Parent(s): Vincenzo Galluppi and Lucrezia Galluppi

Education
- Education: University of Naples Federico II

Pasquale Galluppi (2 April 1770 – 13 December 1846) was an Italian philosopher.

== Biography and philosophy ==
Galluppi was born at Tropea, Calabria, then part of the Kingdom of Two Sicilies, into the patrician Galluppi family. From 1831 he was a professor at the University of Naples, where he died in 1846.

His philosophy is a mixture of assent to and dissent from Descartes, the French and English sensists, Kant, and the Scottish school of Thomas Reid. Cartesianism tempered by the modifications introduced into it by Leibniz, Wolff, and Genovesi, was the system in which Galluppi's mind was trained.

The problem of human knowledge was Galuppi's chief preoccupation. He maintained the objective reality of knowledge, which he based on the testimony of consciousness, making humans aware not only of their internal experience, but also of the external causes to which it is due. This theory was aimed at Kant, though Galluppi agreed with him that space and time are a priori forms in the mind. Against the sensists, he denied that the mind was merely passive or receptive, and held that like a builder it arranged and ordered the materials supplied it, deducing therefrom new truths which sensation alone could never reach. He threw no light, however, on the difference between sensory and intellectual knowledge. This was the great weakness of his argument against the Scottish school, that the soul perceives not only its own affections or the qualities of bodies, but also its own substance and that of things outside itself. It was also natural that Galluppi should be foremost in attacking the theories of Rosmini concerning the idea of God as the first object of human knowledge: and it was this polemic (quiet enough in itself) which drew public attention to the Roveretan philosopher.

The morality of actions, according to Galluppi, depends on the notion of duty which springs from human nature. He never made use of the phrase "categoric imperative", but everything goes to show that on that point he did not completely escape Kant's influence: and although he asserted as the two great moral commandments "Be just" and "Be beneficent", he nonetheless approved of Kant's moral principle. Therefore, he does not draw any connection between the moral law and God, beyond the statement that God must reward virtue and punish vice. Against the Scottish school, on the other hand, he denied that morality depends on the feelings. His theodicy is well within the limits of that of Leibniz, and therefore admits not only the possibility of revelation, but also the divinity of Christianity.

The care and clearness of Galluppi's style made his works very popular; but when the Hegelianism of the Neapolitan school became the fashion in non-Catholic circles of thought, and Scholasticism regained its hold among Catholics, Galluppi's philosophy quickly lost ground. He always kept aloof from political questions; and his works were planned and written in his own home, amidst the noise and bustle of a large and happy family.

== Selected works ==
- Saggio filosofico sulla critica della conoscenza umana, 4 vols
- Lettere sulle vicende della filosofia da Cartesio a Kant
- Elementi di Filosofica
- Lezioni di Logica e Metafisica
- Filosofia della volontà
- Considerazioni filosofiche sull' idealismo trascendentale
- Storia della Filisofia (only the first volume completed)
