= Giuseppe Galluppi =

Italian nobleman, historian and essayist (1836–1891)

- Baron of Pancaldo
- Born: 18 February 1836; Messina, Kingdom of the Two Sicilies
- Died: Messina, Kingdom of Italy
- Noble family: Galluppi
- Spouses: Maria Carrozza Pallavicini (m. 1857; died 1875) Clementina Conti (m. 1882–1891)
- Issue: Francesco; Carmelo Rainero
- Father: Rainero Giuseppe Galluppi Raineri
- Mother: Letteria Cuzzaniti Arenaprimo

Giuseppe Galluppi, Baron of Pancaldo (18 February 1836 – 19 April 1891) was an Italian nobleman, historian and essayist.

== Biography ==
He was born in Messina on 18 February 1836 into the Galluppi family, to Rainero Giuseppe, 3rd Baron of Pancaldo (1794–1880), and his wife the noblewoman Letteria Cuzzaniti Arenaprimo (1816-1906), of whom he was the first of three children.

In 1859–60, he exercised the office of councilor of the District of Messina. Galluppi dealt with genealogy and heraldry, and was the author of numerous publications on the noble families of Messina and Sicily. He was an ordinary member of the Regia Accademia Peloritana of Messina, an ordinary member of the Società Siciliana per la Storia Patria of Palermo, a member of the Commission of Antiquities and Fine Arts of the Province of Messina, an effective member of the Royal Italian Academy of Heraldry, and correspondent of the Consulta Araldica of the Kingdom.

He was an expert in Messinese genealogies. Among his best known works are his Nobiliario della città di Messina (1874) and Stato presente della nobiltà Messinese, published with Bernardoni in Milan in 1881. The latter is a corollary of the former, and is an account of the Messinese noble families of the day, both those thriving in Messina and elsewhere.

He died in Messina on 19 April 1891, at the age of 55, and with him the branch of the Galluppi family of the Barons of Pancaldo died out.

== Marriages and descent ==
In 1857, he married the noblewoman Maria Carrozza Pallavicini (1840–1875), daughter of Giovanni, Marquis of San Leonardo, with whom he had his sons Francesco (1860–1861) and Carmelo Rainero (1865–1877), who both died prematurely.

In 1882, he married for a second time to the noblewoman Clementina Conti (1860–?), from whom he had no heirs.

== Works ==
- L'Ordine militare della Stella in Messina, Milan, Wilmant (1871)
- L'armerista italiano, Milan, Wilmant (1872)
- Cenno storico sulla famiglia d'Arena detta oggi Arena-Primo, Milan, Wilmant (1873)
- Genealogia della famiglia Cuzzanti di Messina, Pisa, Giornale Araldico (1874)
- Nobiliario della città di Messina, Milan, Wilmant (1874)
- Dizionario araldico italiano-francese dei principali termini usati nel blasone, Naples, De Angelis (1875)
- Stato presente della nobiltà messinese, Milan, Rebeschini (1881)
- Genealogia della famiglia Porzio di Messina, Pisa, Giornale Araldico (1884)
- Genealogia della famiglia di Giovanni di Messina, Pisa, Giornale Araldico (1885)
- Ruolo dei titolati messinesi, Naples, De Angelis (1885)
- Genealogia dei Ruffo di Messina, Pisa, Giornale Araldico (1886)
- Genealogia della famiglia Marchese di Messina, Pisa, Giornale Araldico (1887)
- I titoli di regio cavaliere e di nobile concessi o riconosciuti in Sicilia dal sec. XVI, Pisa, Giornale Araldico (1889)
- I titolati siciliani. Ultimi investiti, Pisa, Giornale Araldico (1890)
