= Tropea =

Municipality in Calabria, Italy

Tropea Trupìa (Sicilian) Trápeia (Greek)
- Comune
- Comune di Tropea
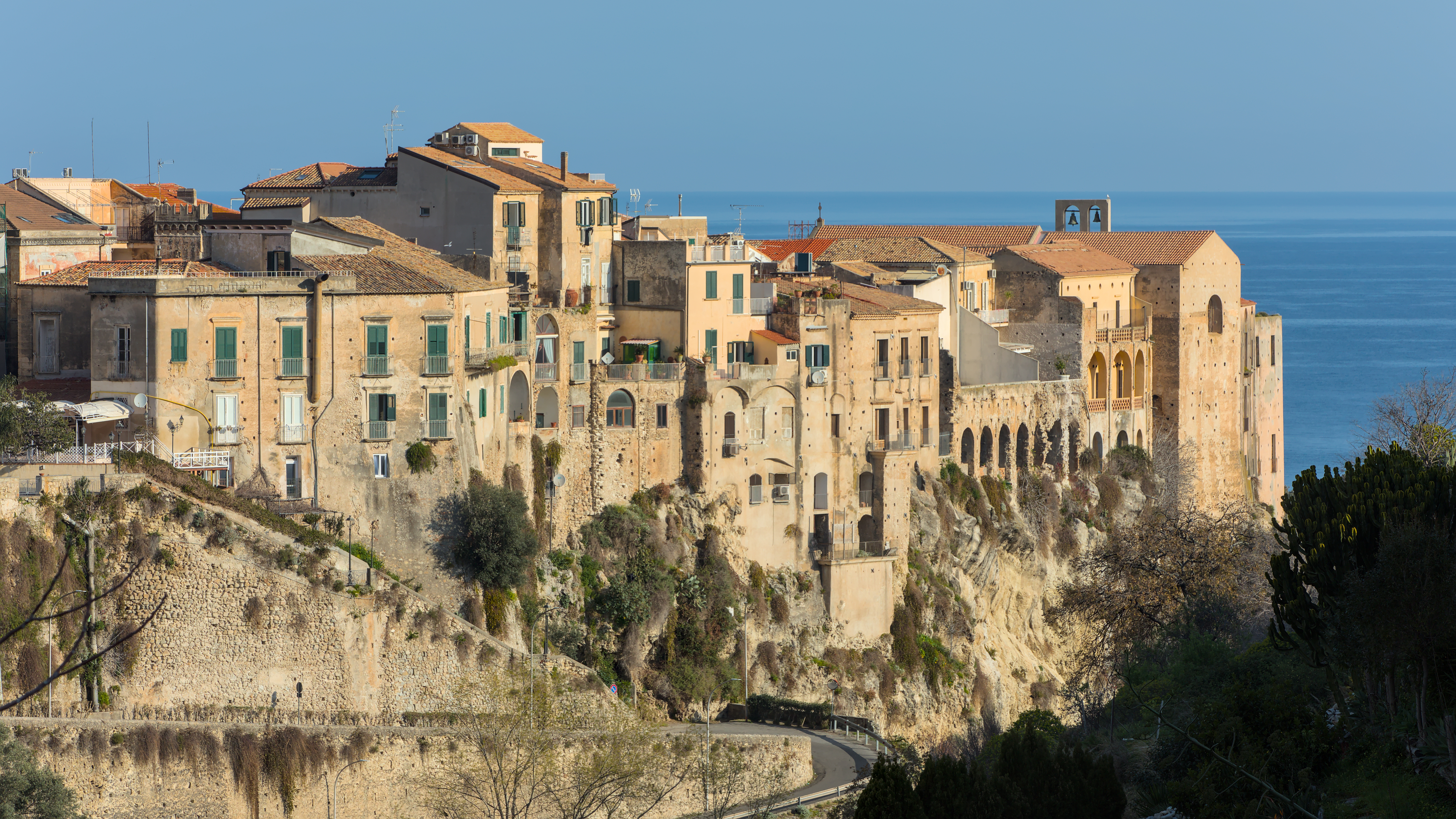
- View of the historic centre of Tropea

- Coat of arms

- Location within Italy Location within Calabria
- Coordinates: 38.67538°N 15.89479°E
- Country: Italy
- Region: Calabria
- Province: Vibo Valentia (VV)
- Frazioni: Marina

Government
  - Mayor: Giovanni Macrì (Forza Italia)

Area
  - Total: 3.66 km^{2} (1.41 sq mi)
- Elevation: 60 m (200 ft)

Population (2026)
  - Total: 5,668
  - Density: 1,550/km^{2} (4,010/sq mi)
- Demonym: Tropeani (dialectal: Trupiani)
- Time zone: UTC+1 (CET)
  - Summer (DST): UTC+2 (CEST)
- Postal code: 89861
- Dialing code: 0963
- Patron saint: St. Madonna of Romania
- Saint day: March 27
- Website: www.comune.tropea.vv.it

Tropea (Italian: [troˈpɛːa]; Calabrian: Trupìa; Latin: Tropaea; Ancient Greek: Τράπεια, romanized: Trápeia) is a resort town in the Province of Vibo Valentia in the region of Calabria in southern Italy. It is one of I Borghi più belli d'Italia ("The most beautiful villages of Italy"). It has 5,668 inhabitants.

Tropea is a popular seaside destination with sandy beaches, located on the Gulf of Saint Euphemia, part of the Tyrrhenian Sea, on Italy's west coast and was named "Most beautiful village in Italy" for 2021.

== Demographics ==
As of 2026, the population is 5,668, of which 48.1% are male, and 51.9% are female. Minors make up 12.2% of the population, and seniors make up 27.5%.

Historical population

| Year | Pop. | ±% |
|---|---|---|
| 1861 | 5,133 | — |
| 1871 | 5,703 | +11.1% |
| 1881 | 5,929 | +4.0% |
| 1901 | 6,264 | +5.7% |
| 1911 | 6,001 | −4.2% |
| 1921 | 6,028 | +0.4% |
| 1931 | 5,913 | −1.9% |
| 1936 | 6,088 | +3.0% |

| Year | Pop. | ±% |
|---|---|---|
| 1951 | 6,953 | +14.2% |
| 1961 | 6,702 | −3.6% |
| 1971 | 6,852 | +2.2% |
| 1981 | 6,868 | +0.2% |
| 1991 | 6,869 | +0.0% |
| 2001 | 6,836 | −0.5% |
| 2011 | 6,555 | −4.1% |
| 2021 | 5,911 | −9.8% |

Source: ISTAT

=== Immigration ===
As of 2025, immigrants make up 7.1% of the population. The 5 largest foreign countries of birth are Romania, Ukraine, Argentina, Poland, and Germany.

== Main sights ==
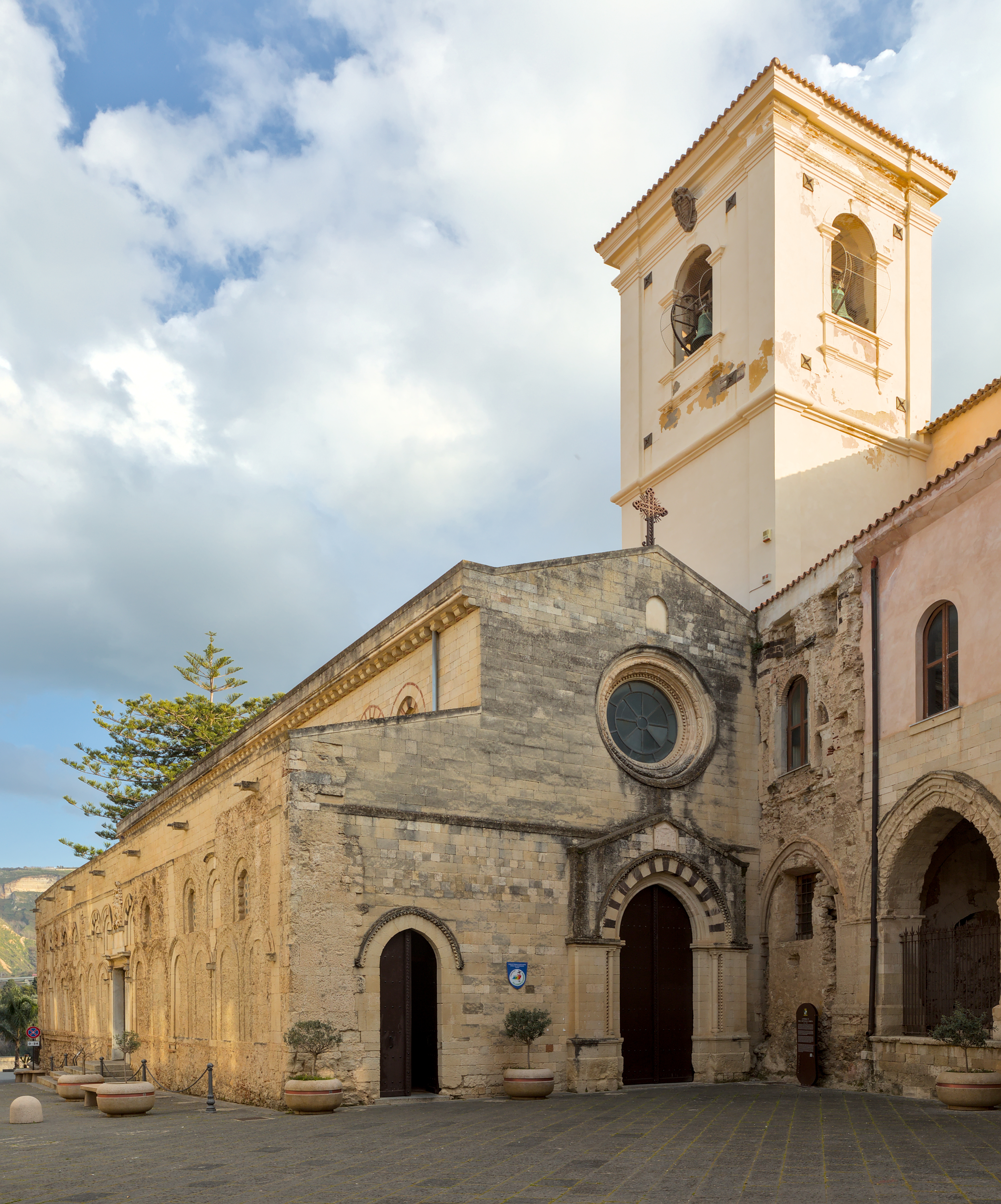
Cocathedral of Maria Santissima di Romania

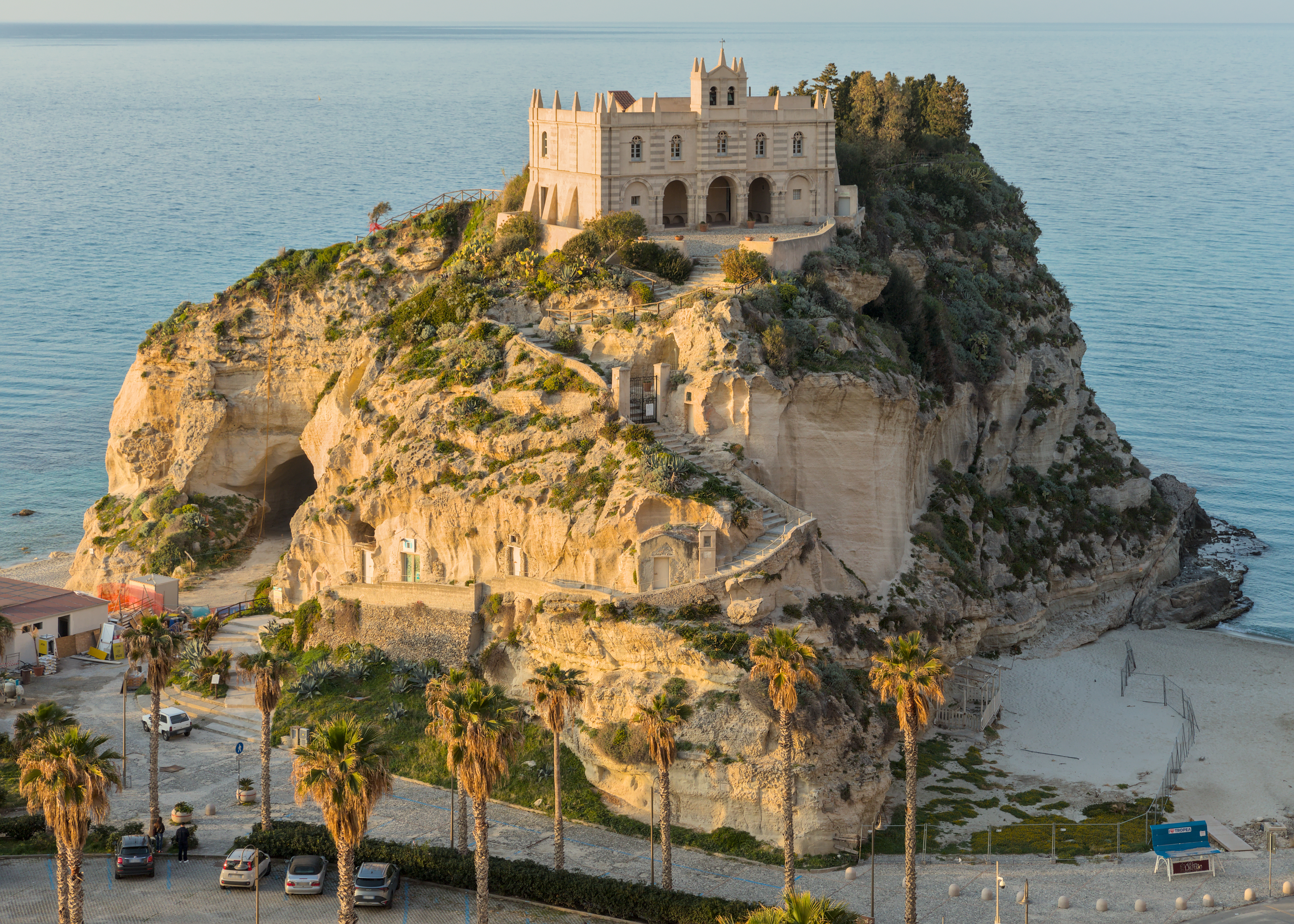
Church of Santa Maria dell'Isola, on a presque-isle

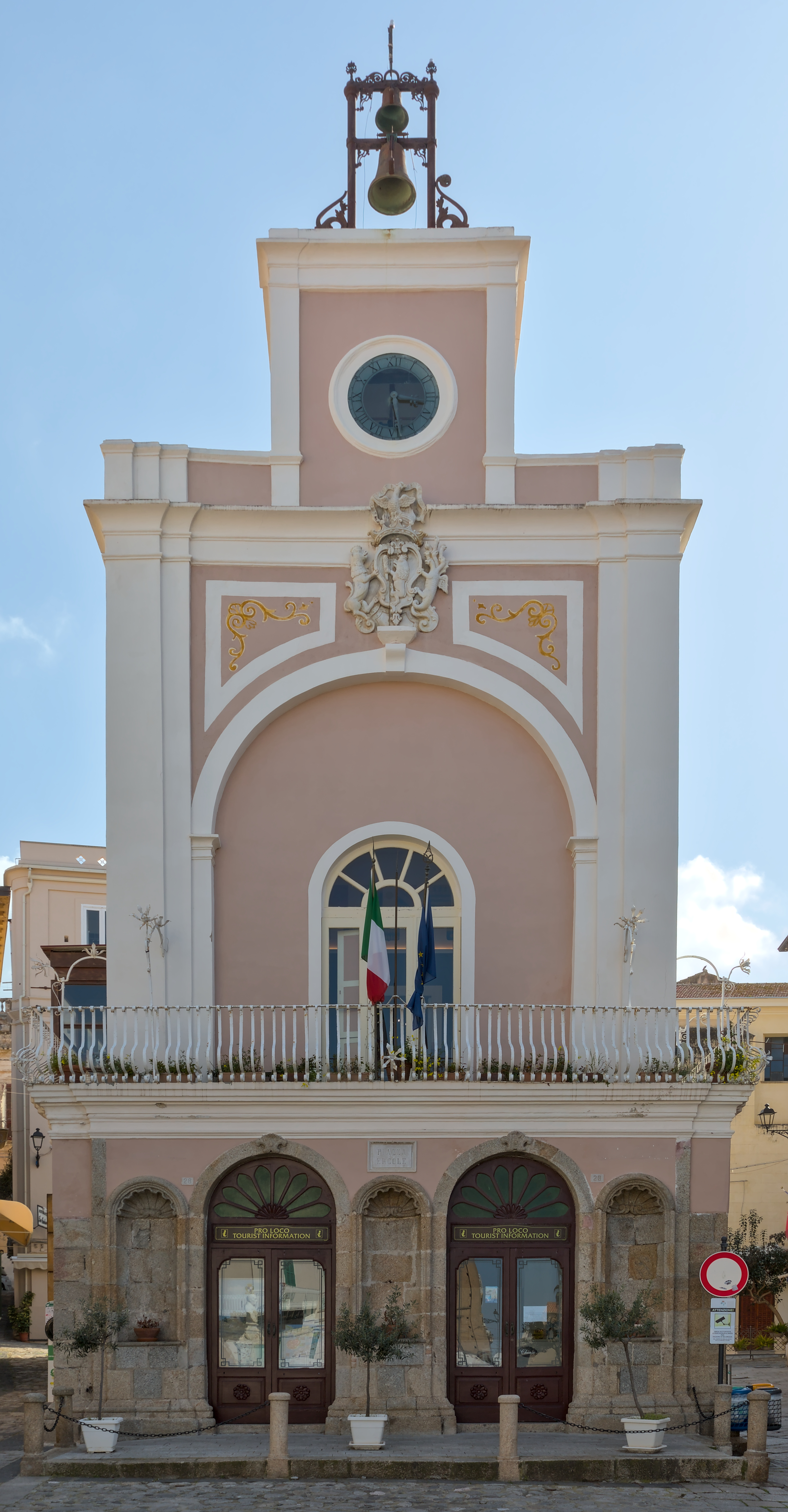
Palazzo dei Nobili

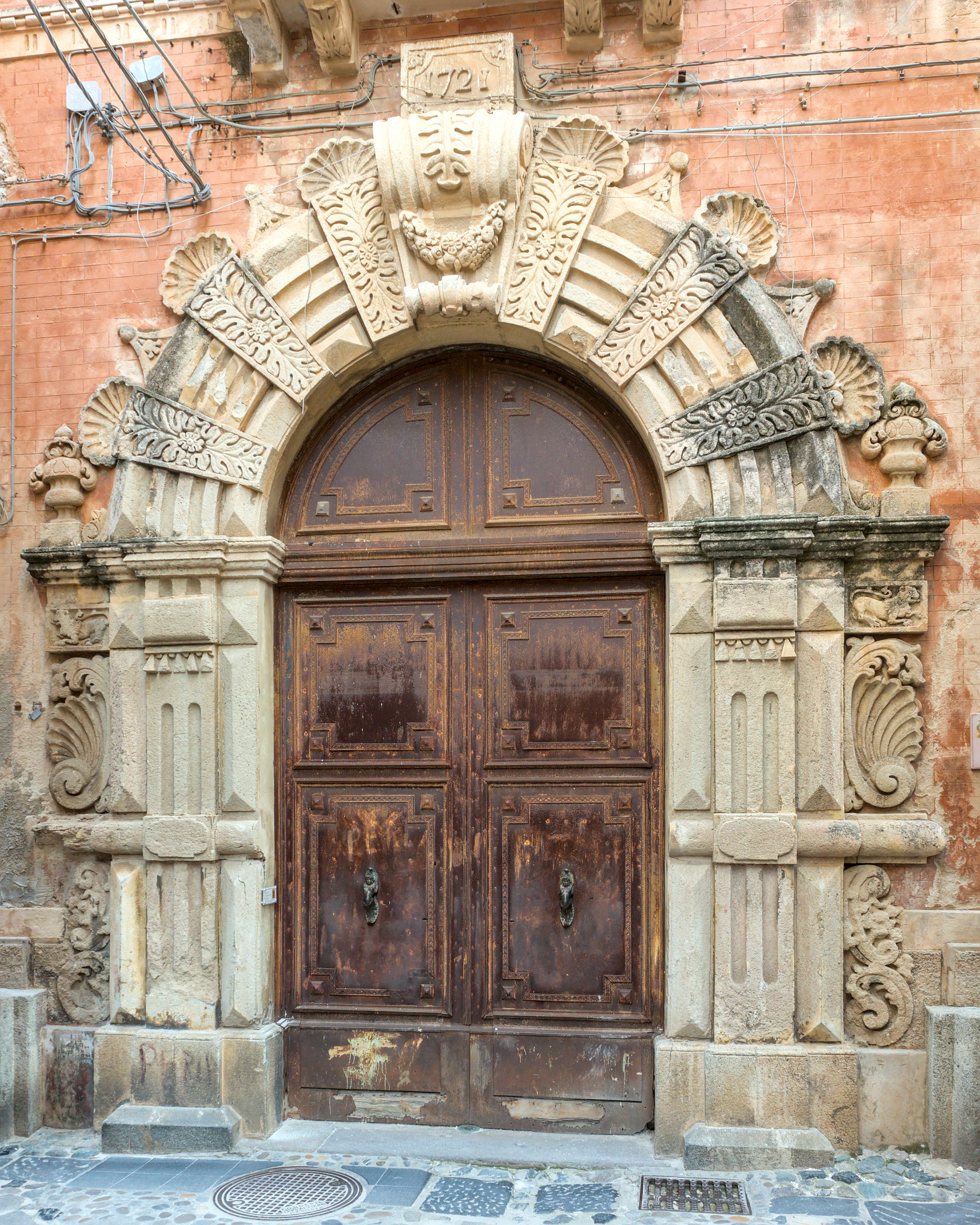
17th-18th-century palaces, such as Palazzo Bragho

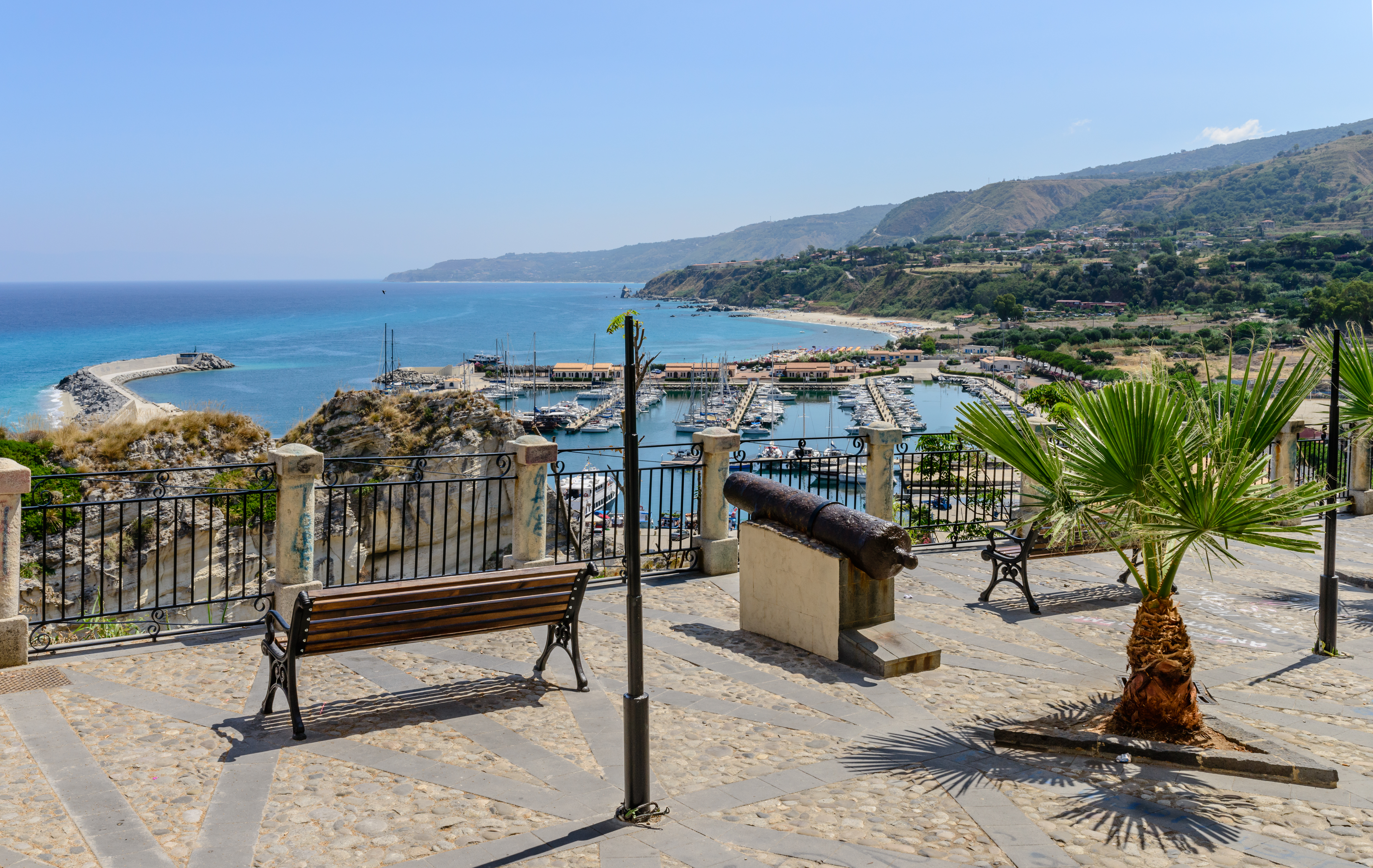
Viewpoints, such as this one over the port

== Notable people ==
- Albert Anastasia, American mobster
- Pasquale Galluppi, philosopher
- Raf Vallone, actor

== International relations ==
=== Twin towns – sister cities ===
Tropea is twinned with:

- Zvenigorod, Russia (2013)
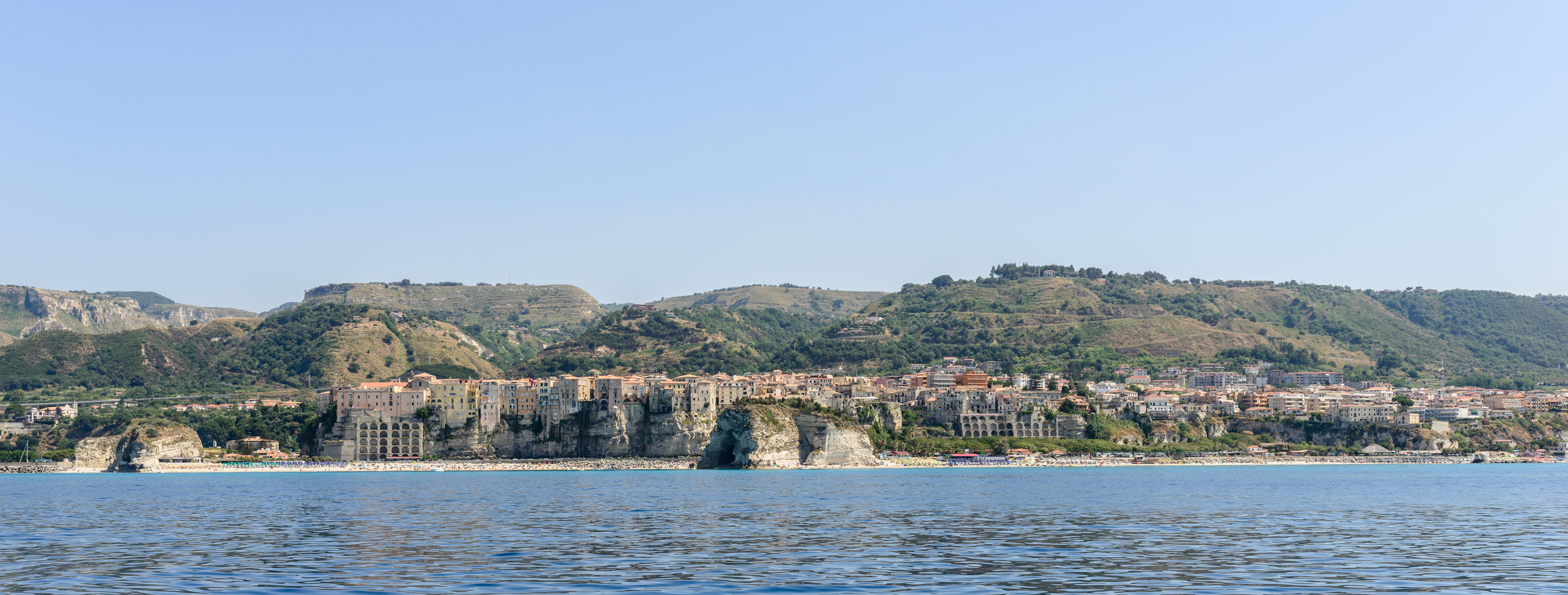
Panorama of Tropea from the Tyrrhenian Sea
