= Pasquale Bonavota =

Italian mobster (born 1974)

- Born: 10 January 1974 (age 52); Vibo Valentia, Italy
- Occupation: Crime boss
- Parent: Vincenzo Bonavota
- Status: Imprisoned
- Allegiance: Bonavota 'ndrina/'Ndrangheta
- Convictions: Mafia association Multiple murders
- Criminal charges: Mafia association Multiple murders
- Penalty: Life imprisonment (in absentia)

Pasquale Bonavota (born 10 January 1974) is an Italian mobster belonging to the Bonavota 'ndrina of the 'Ndrangheta in Calabria. From 28 November 2018 until 27 April 2023, he had been in the list of the most dangerous fugitives in Italy.

== Biography ==
Bonavota was the son of Vincenzo Bonavota, founder and historical leader of the Bonavota 'ndrina who had been dead in 1997, according to public prosecutor Marisa Manzini. He was already active within the clan since the age of 16, when there was a violent and bloody feud between the Bonavotas of Sant'Onofrio and the Petrolo-Bartolottas of Stefanaconi, consummated with the well-known "Epiphany massacre" in 1991. After being sentenced by the Court of Catanzaro to life imprisonment for mafia-type criminal association and complicity in murder, Bonavota had also been wanted internationally since 2018.

== Capture ==
Bonavota had been a fugitive, which ended on 27 April 2023 when he was arrested in Genoa.

== See also ==
- List of members of the 'Ndrangheta
- List of most wanted fugitives in Italy
