= Serra San Bruno =

- Comune
- Comune di Serra San Bruno
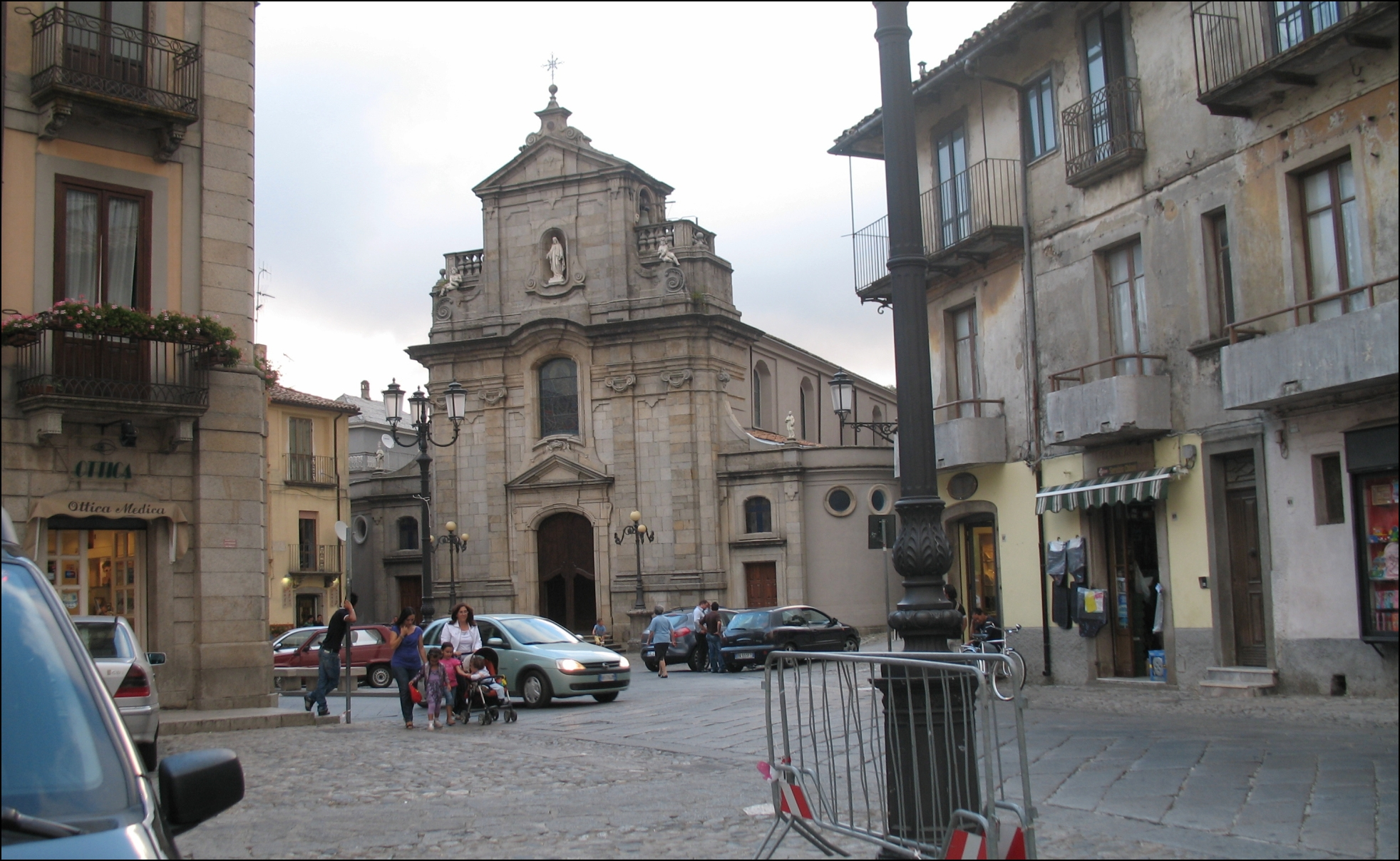
- San Biagio's Church in San Bruno

- Map of Vibo Valentia

- Location within Italy Location within Calabria
- Coordinates: 38°35′N 16°20′E
- Country: Italy
- Region: Calabria
- Province: Province of Vibo Valentia (VV)
- Frazioni: Ninfo

Area
  - Total: 40.57 km^{2} (15.66 sq mi)
- Elevation: 870 m (2,850 ft)

Population (31 May 2026)
  - Total: 6,240
  - Density: 154/km^{2} (398/sq mi)
- Demonym: Serresi
- Time zone: UTC+1 (CET)
  - Summer (DST): UTC+2 (CEST)
- Postal code: 89822
- Dialing code: 0963
- Website: Official website

Serra San Bruno (Calabrian: La Serra) is a comune (municipality) in the Province of Vibo Valentia in the Italian region Calabria, located about 40 kilometres (25 mi) southwest of Catanzaro and about 25 kilometres (16 mi) southeast of Vibo Valentia. As of 31 May 2026, it had a population of 6,240 and an area of 39.6 square kilometres (15.3 mi^{2}).

Close by is the famous Carthusian monastery, Serra San Bruno Charterhouse (Certosa di Santo Stefano di Serra San Bruno), around which the town grew up. The town is named after Saint Bruno of Cologne, who founded the Carthusian Order in 1053 and the Grande Chartreuse, mother house of the Carthusians, near Grenoble, in France. He built the charterhouse of Serra San Bruno in 1095, and died here in 1101.

The municipality of Serra San Bruno contains the frazione (subdivision) Ninfo.

Serra San Bruno borders the following municipalities: Arena, Gerocarne, Mongiana, Spadola, Brognaturo, Simbario, Stilo.

The movie Le Quattro Volte was filmed in this town.

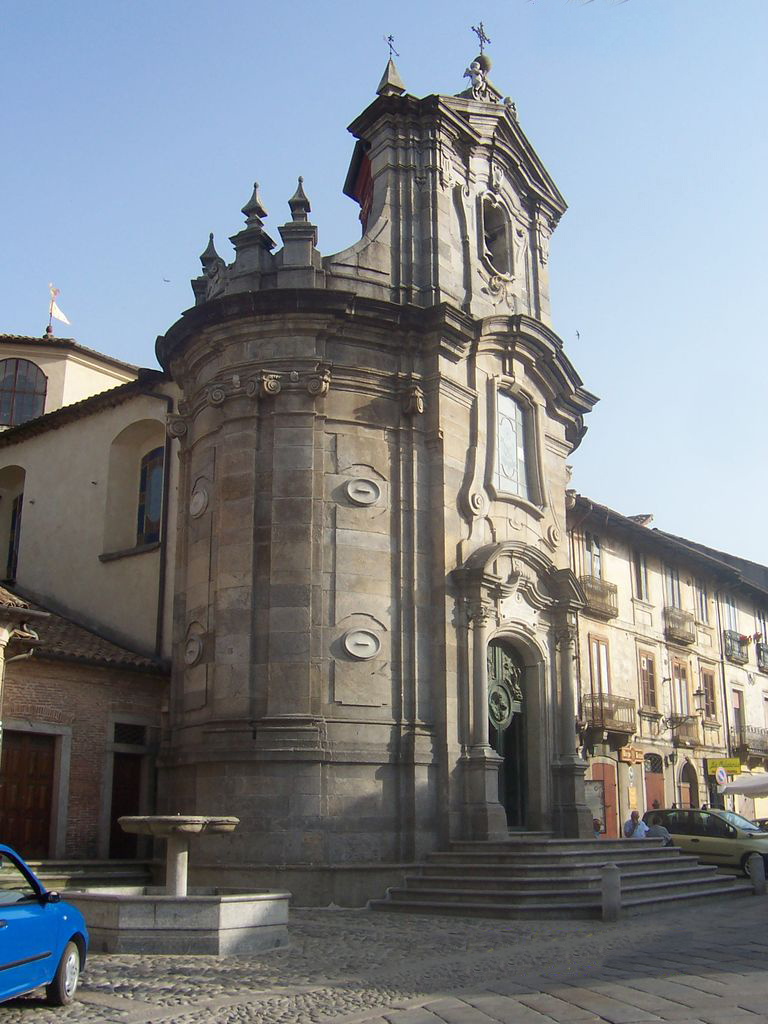
Addolorata's Church

== Demographic evolution ==
Historical population

Year	Pop.	±%
1861	5,804	—
1871	5,214	−10.2%
1881	5,279	+1.2%
1901	6,497	+23.1%
1911	6,792	+4.5%

Year	Pop.	±%
1921	7,240	+6.6%
1931	7,698	+6.3%
1936	6,882	−10.6%
1951	8,348	+21.3%
1961	8,517	+2.0%

Year	Pop.	±%
1971	6,661	−21.8%
1981	6,374	−4.3%
1991	6,759	+6.0%
2001	7,068	+4.6%

Source: Data from ISTAT
