= S. serrata =

S. serrata may refer to:

- Saurauia serrata, a plant species endemic to Mexico
- Scylla serrata, the mud crab or mangrove crab, an economically important crab species found in the estuaries and mangroves of Africa, Australia and Asia
- Synodontis serrata, a catfish species

== See also ==
- Serrata (disambiguation)
