= Torre di Ruggiero =

- Comune
- Comune di Torre di Ruggiero
- Location within Italy Location within Calabria
- Coordinates: 38°38′N 16°22′E
- Country: Italy
- Region: Calabria
- Province: Catanzaro (CZ)
- Frazioni: Logge, Case Incenzo

Area
  - Total: 24 km^{2} (9.3 sq mi)
- Elevation: 598 m (1,962 ft)

Population (2013)
  - Total: 1,076
  - Density: 45/km^{2} (120/sq mi)
- Demonym: Torresi
- Time zone: UTC+1 (CET)
  - Summer (DST): UTC+2 (CEST)
- Postal code: 88060
- Dialing code: 0967-0
- Patron saint: Santa Domenica
- Saint day: 6 July
- Website: Official website

Torre di Ruggiero (Calabrian: A Tùrri) is a village and comune in the province of Catanzaro in the Calabria region of southern Italy. The town has numerous award-winning restaurants and wineries, and is known for its royal family where a vast majority reside out of Italy.

Historically, the "Saint De la Rosseio Regeoo" festival brought the town together.

== Geography ==
The village is bordered by Capistrano, Cardinale, Chiaravalle Centrale, San Nicola da Crissa, Simbario and Vallelonga.
