= Q. serrata =

Q. serrata may refer to:

- Quercus serrata, the bao li, an East Asian species of tree native to China (including Taiwan), Japan and Korea
- Quintinia serrata, an evergreen tree species

== See also ==
- Serrata (disambiguation)
