= Bonavota 'ndrina =

- Founded: 1980s
- Founding location: Sant'Onofrio and Stefanaconi, Calabria, Italy
- Years active: 1980s-present
- Territory: Sant'Onofrio and Stefanaconi in Calabria; Presence also in Piedmont and Lazio. Outside Italy it is present in Toronto, Canada and in Geneva, Switzerland
- Ethnicity: Calabrians
- Allies: Mancuso 'ndrina Commisso 'ndrina

The Bonavota 'ndrina is a clan of the 'Ndrangheta, a criminal and mafia-type organisation in Calabria, Italy.

The 'ndrina is based in Sant'Onofrio and Stefanaconi in the Vibo area. They also have presence in Turin, Carmagnola and Moncalieri in Piedmont and Rome. The 'ndrina is present also in Toronto, Canada and is known to laundering much of their profits from drug trafficking in Geneva, Switzerland.

The Bonavota are allies of the Anello, Lo Bianco and Mancuso 'ndrina. Their activities include extortion, loan sharking, drug trafficking and money laundering.

== History ==
The origins of the Bonavota 'ndrina can be traced back to the 1980s. A murder that occurred on 25 December 1980 in Carmagnola would establish the domination of the gang from there until today, headed by Salvatore Arone, over the city.

== Structure ==
From the operation (end of 2017) and the Conquista process of the same name still underway, the organizational chart of the gang would appear: company leader Pasquale Bonavota, military leader Domenico Bonavota while Domenico Bonavota, Domenico Febbraro, Giuseppe Lopreiato and Onofrio Barbieri would be affiliated. The Carmagnola location in the province of Turin, previously only a detached 'ndrina, is controlled by the 'ndrina like an 'ndrina created in Rome by Pasquale Bonavota.
