= Laureana di Borrello =

Laureana di Borrello Greek: Loriàna
- Comune
- Comune di Laureana di Borrello
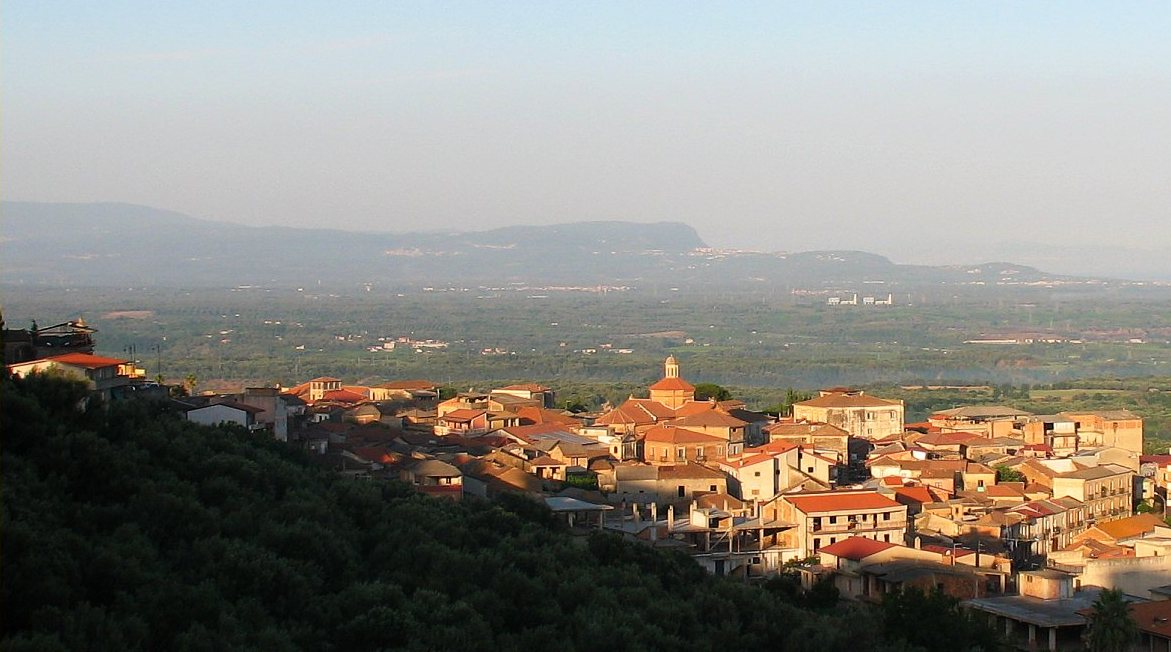

- Location within Italy Location within Calabria
- Coordinates: 38°29′N 16°5′E
- Country: Italy
- Region: Calabria
- Metropolitan city: Reggio Calabria (RC)
- Frazioni: Bellantone, Sant'Anna, Stelletanone

Government
  - Mayor: Paolo Alvaro

Area
  - Total: 35.4 km^{2} (13.7 sq mi)
- Elevation: 273 m (896 ft)

Population (31 August 2012)
  - Total: 5,243
  - Density: 148/km^{2} (384/sq mi)
- Demonym: Laureanesi
- Time zone: UTC+1 (CET)
  - Summer (DST): UTC+2 (CEST)
- Postal code: 89023
- Dialing code: (+39)0966
- Patron saint: St. Gregory and St. Mary
- Saint day: 17 November
- Website: www.laureanaborrello.it

Laureana di Borrello (Calabrian: Loriàna) is a comune (municipality) in the Metropolitan City of Reggio Calabria in the Italian region of Calabria, located about 60 kilometres (37 mi) southwest of Catanzaro and about 60 kilometres (37 mi) northeast of Reggio Calabria.

== Geography ==
Laureana di Borrello borders the following municipalities: Candidoni, Serrata, San Pietro di Caridà, Feroleto della Chiesa, Galatro, Rosarno, San Calogero.

Laureana di Borrello includes the villages of Bellantone, Case sparse, Sant'Anna, and Stelletanone.

== Demographics ==
This table depicts the population of the municipality.

Historical population

Year	Pop.	±%
1861	5,161	—
1871	5,772	+11.8%
1881	6,051	+4.8%
1901	7,148	+18.1%
1911	7,789	+9.0%

Year	Pop.	±%
1921	8,630	+10.8%
1931	9,079	+5.2%
1936	9,029	−0.6%
1951	10,127	+12.2%
1961	8,851	−12.6%

Year	Pop.	±%
1971	7,871	−11.1%
1981	6,921	−12.1%
1991	6,442	−6.9%
2001	5,709	−11.4%
2011	5,289	−7.4%

Source: Data from ISTAT
