= Filogaso =

Filogaso Philagassos (Greek)
- Comune
- Comune di Filogaso
- Location within Italy Location within Calabria
- Coordinates: 38°41′N 16°14′E
- Country: Italy
- Region: Calabria
- Province: Province of Vibo Valentia (VV)

Area
  - Total: 23.7 km^{2} (9.2 sq mi)

Population (Dec. 2004)
  - Total: 1,397
  - Density: 58.9/km^{2} (153/sq mi)
- Time zone: UTC+1 (CET)
  - Summer (DST): UTC+2 (CEST)
- Postal code: 89843
- Dialing code: 0963

Filogaso (Calabrian: Filogàsi; Greek: Philagassos) is a comune (municipality) in the Province of Vibo Valentia in the Italian region Calabria, located about 40 kilometres (25 mi) southwest of Catanzaro and about 13 kilometres (8 mi) east of Vibo Valentia. As of 31 December 2004, it had a population of 1,397 and an area of 23.7 square kilometres (9.2 mi^{2}).

Filogaso borders the following municipalities: Capistrano, Maierato, San Nicola da Crissa, Sant'Onofrio, Vallelonga, Vazzano.

== Demographic evolution ==
Historical population

Year	Pop.	±%
1861	837	—
1871	693	−17.2%
1881	655	−5.5%
1901	786	+20.0%
1911	884	+12.5%

Year	Pop.	±%
1921	901	+1.9%
1931	1,125	+24.9%
1936	1,147	+2.0%
1951	1,429	+24.6%
1961	1,459	+2.1%

Year	Pop.	±%
1971	1,097	−24.8%
1981	1,176	+7.2%
1991	1,366	+16.2%
2001	1,377	+0.8%

Source: Data from ISTAT
