= Dasà =

Dasà Greek: Dasia
- Comune
- Comune di Dasà
- Location within Italy Location within Calabria
- Coordinates: 38°34′N 16°12′E
- Country: Italy
- Region: Calabria
- Province: Vibo Valentia (VV)

Government
  - Mayor: Extraordinary commissar

Area
  - Total: 6.19 km^{2} (2.39 sq mi)
- Elevation: 258 m (846 ft)

Population (30 April 2012)
  - Total: 1,183
  - Density: 191/km^{2} (495/sq mi)
- Demonym: Dasaesi
- Time zone: UTC+1 (CET)
  - Summer (DST): UTC+2 (CEST)
- Postal code: 89832
- Dialing code: 0963
- Website: Official website

Dasà (Greek: Dasia) is a comune (municipality) in the Province of Vibo Valentia in the Italian region Calabria, located about 50 kilometres (31 mi) southwest of Catanzaro and about 15 kilometres (9 mi) southeast of Vibo Valentia.

== Geography ==
Dasà borders the following municipalities: Acquaro, Arena, Dinami, Gerocarne.

== Demographics ==
Historical population

Year	Pop.	±%
1861	1,666	—
1871	1,635	−1.9%
1881	1,584	−3.1%
1901	1,854	+17.0%
1911	1,854	+0.0%

Year	Pop.	±%
1921	2,091	+12.8%
1931	2,172	+3.9%
1936	2,168	−0.2%
1951	2,528	+16.6%
1961	2,453	−3.0%

Year	Pop.	±%
1971	1,912	−22.1%
1981	1,603	−16.2%
1991	1,496	−6.7%
2001	1,308	−12.6%
2011	1,272	−2.8%

Source: Data from ISTAT
