= Vazzano =

- Comune
- Comune di Vazzano
- Location within Italy Location within Calabria
- Coordinates: 38°38′N 16°15′E
- Country: Italy
- Region: Calabria
- Province: Province of Vibo Valentia (VV)

Government
  - Mayor: Domenico Villì (Vazzano sei tu!)

Area
  - Total: 19.9 km^{2} (7.7 sq mi)

Population (Dec. 2004)
  - Total: 1,170
  - Density: 58.8/km^{2} (152/sq mi)
- Time zone: UTC+1 (CET)
  - Summer (DST): UTC+2 (CEST)
- Postal code: 88010
- Dialing code: 0963

Vazzano is a comune (municipality) in the Province of Vibo Valentia in the Italian region Calabria, located about 40 kilometres (25 mi) southwest of Catanzaro and about 15 kilometres (9 mi) east of Vibo Valentia. As of 31 December 2004, it had a population of 1,170 and an area of 19.9 square kilometres (7.7 mi^{2}).

Vazzano borders the following municipalities: Filogaso, Pizzoni, Sant'Onofrio, Simbario, Stefanaconi and Vallelonga.

== Demographic evolution ==
Historical population

Year	Pop.	±%
1861	1,162	—
1871	1,259	+8.3%
1881	1,040	−17.4%
1901	1,475	+41.8%
1911	1,675	+13.6%

Year	Pop.	±%
1921	1,780	+6.3%
1931	2,093	+17.6%
1936	1,758	−16.0%
1951	2,029	+15.4%
1961	1,725	−15.0%

Year	Pop.	±%
1971	1,519	−11.9%
1981	1,229	−19.1%
1991	1,309	+6.5%
2001	1,231	−6.0%

Source: Data from ISTAT
