= San Costantino Calabro =

San Costantino Calabro Griko: Aghios Konstantinos Kalavros
- Comune
- Comune di San Costantino Calabro
- Location within Italy Location within Calabria
- Coordinates: 38°38′N 16°4′E
- Country: Italy
- Region: Calabria
- Province: Province of Vibo Valentia (VV)
- Frazioni: non ha frazioni

Area
  - Total: 7.0 km^{2} (2.7 sq mi)
- Elevation: 454 m (1,490 ft)

Population (Dec. 2004)
  - Total: 2,320
  - Density: 330/km^{2} (860/sq mi)
- Demonym: Sancostantinesi
- Time zone: UTC+1 (CET)
  - Summer (DST): UTC+2 (CEST)
- Postal code: 89851
- Dialing code: 0963
- Website: Official website

San Costantino Calabro (Greek: Aghios Konstantinos Kalavros) is a comune (municipality) in the Province of Vibo Valentia in the Italian region Calabria, located about 50 kilometres (31 mi) southwest of Catanzaro and about 4 kilometres (2 mi) southwest of Vibo Valentia. As of 31 December 2004, it had a population of 2,320 and an area of 7.0 square kilometres (2.7 mi^{2}).

San Costantino Calabro borders the following municipalities: Francica, Jonadi, Mileto, San Gregorio d'Ippona.

Sign in the center of the comune of San Costantino

Center of the comune of San Costantino

One of the many lemon trees

Road in San Costantino

== Demographic evolution ==
Historical population

Year	Pop.	±%
1861	1,699	—
1871	1,791	+5.4%
1881	1,870	+4.4%
1901	2,403	+28.5%
1911	2,419	+0.7%
1921	2,518	+4.1%

Year	Pop.	±%
1931	2,493	−1.0%
1936	2,520	+1.1%
1951	2,527	+0.3%
1961	2,472	−2.2%
1971	2,270	−8.2%
1981	2,281	+0.5%

Year	Pop.	±%
1991	2,427	+6.4%
2001	2,308	−4.9%
2011	2,238	−3.0%
2021	2,089	−6.7%

Source: Data from ISTAT
