= Vallelonga =

- Comune
- Comune di Vallelonga
- Location within Italy Location within Calabria
- Coordinates: 38°39′N 16°17′E
- Country: Italy
- Region: Calabria
- Province: Province of Vibo Valentia (VV)

Area
  - Total: 17.5 km^{2} (6.8 sq mi)
- Elevation: 646 m (2,119 ft)

Population (Dec. 2004)
  - Total: 726
  - Density: 41.5/km^{2} (107/sq mi)
- Demonym: Vallelonghesi
- Time zone: UTC+1 (CET)
  - Summer (DST): UTC+2 (CEST)
- Postal code: 89821
- Dialing code: 0963

Vallelonga is a comune (municipality) in the Province of Vibo Valentia in the Italian region Calabria, located about 40 kilometres (25 mi) southwest of Catanzaro and about 20 kilometres (12 mi) east of Vibo Valentia. As of 31 December 2016, it had a population of 702 and an area of 17.5 square kilometres (6.8 mi^{2}).

Vallelonga borders the following municipalities: Filogaso, San Nicola da Crissa, Simbario, Torre di Ruggiero, Vazzano.

Vallelonghesi started to emigrate to Canada in large numbers in the 1950s, eventually forming a community of paesani larger than that in Vallelonga itself. Club Vallelonga-Monseratto hosts an annual Festa in the town of Loretto, Ontario.

Upon moving to Canada, many Vallelonghesi worked in the sewer/watermain and concrete industries, eventually forming their own companies.

Large numbers of Vallelonghesi can also be found in parts of Australia and Argentina.

== Demographic evolution ==
Historical population

Year	Pop.	±%
1861	1,729	—
1871	1,861	+7.6%
1881	2,100	+12.8%
1901	2,283	+8.7%
1911	2,424	+6.2%
1921	2,670	+10.1%

Year	Pop.	±%
1931	2,668	−0.1%
1936	2,527	−5.3%
1951	2,637	+4.4%
1961	1,719	−34.8%
1971	1,098	−36.1%
1981	839	−23.6%

Year	Pop.	±%
1991	883	+5.2%
2001	759	−14.0%
2011	682	−10.1%
2016	702	+2.9%
2021	734	+4.6%

Source: Data from ISTAT
