= Brognaturo =

Brognaturo Vrontismènon (Greek)
- Comune
- Comune di Brognaturo
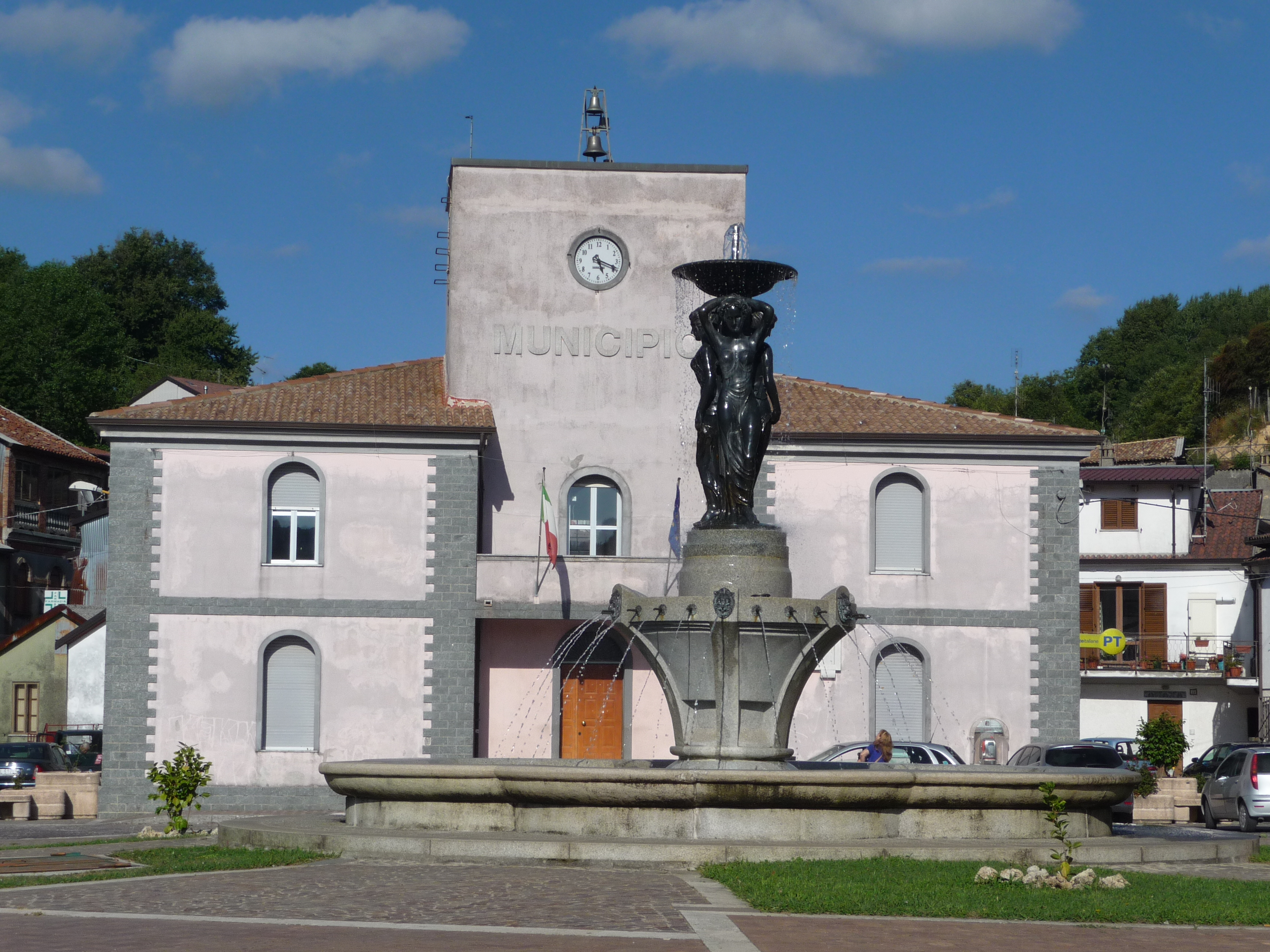
- Town hall.

- Location within Italy Location within Calabria
- Coordinates: 38°36′N 16°20′E
- Country: Italy
- Region: Calabria
- Province: Vibo Valentia (VV)

Government
  - Mayor: Cosmo Tassone

Area
  - Total: 24.69 km^{2} (9.53 sq mi)
- Elevation: 760 m (2,490 ft)

Population (30 April 2017)
  - Total: 722
  - Density: 29.2/km^{2} (75.7/sq mi)
- Demonym: Brognaturesi
- Time zone: UTC+1 (CET)
  - Summer (DST): UTC+2 (CEST)
- Postal code: 89822
- Dialing code: 0963
- Website: Official website

Brognaturo (Calabrian: Vrunnatùri) is a comune (municipality) in the Province of Vibo Valentia in the Italian region Calabria, located about 40 kilometres (25 mi) southwest of Catanzaro and about 25 kilometres (16 mi) southeast of Vibo Valentia.

Brognaturo borders the following municipalities: Badolato, Cardinale, Guardavalle, San Sostene, Santa Caterina dello Ionio, Simbario, Spadola, Stilo.
