= Capistrano, Calabria =

Capistrano
- Comune
- Comune di Capistrano
- Location within Italy Location within Calabria
- Coordinates: 38°41′N 16°17′E
- Country: Italy
- Region: Calabria
- Province: Province of Vibo Valentia (VV)
- Frazioni: Nicastrello

Area
  - Total: 21.0 km^{2} (8.1 sq mi)
- Elevation: 352 m (1,155 ft)

Population (Dec. 2004)
  - Total: 1,147
  - Density: 54.6/km^{2} (141/sq mi)
- Demonym: Capistranesi
- Time zone: UTC+1 (CET)
  - Summer (DST): UTC+2 (CEST)
- Postal code: 89818
- Dialing code: 0963
- Website: comune.capistrano.vv.it

Capistrano (Calabrian: Capistrànu) is a comune (municipality) in the Province of Vibo Valentia in the Italian region Calabria, located about 35 kilometres (22 mi) southwest of Catanzaro and about 20 kilometres (12 mi) east of Vibo Valentia. As of 31 December 2004, it had a population of 1,147 and an area of 21.0 square kilometres (8.1 mi^{2}).

The municipality of Capistrano contains the frazione (subdivision) Nicastrello.

Capistrano borders the following municipalities: Chiaravalle Centrale, Filogaso, Maierato, Monterosso Calabro, San Nicola da Crissa, San Vito sullo Ionio, Torre di Ruggiero.

== Demographic evolution ==
Historical population

Year	Pop.	±%
1861	1,271	—
1871	1,236	−2.8%
1881	1,143	−7.5%
1901	1,351	+18.2%
1911	1,422	+5.3%

Year	Pop.	±%
1921	1,553	+9.2%
1931	1,541	−0.8%
1936	1,605	+4.2%
1951	1,951	+21.6%
1961	2,108	+8.0%

Year	Pop.	±%
1971	1,622	−23.1%
1981	1,298	−20.0%
1991	1,309	+0.8%
2001	1,205	−7.9%

Source: Data from ISTAT
