= Candidoni =

Candidoni Greek: Athidòn
- Comune
- Comune di Candidoni
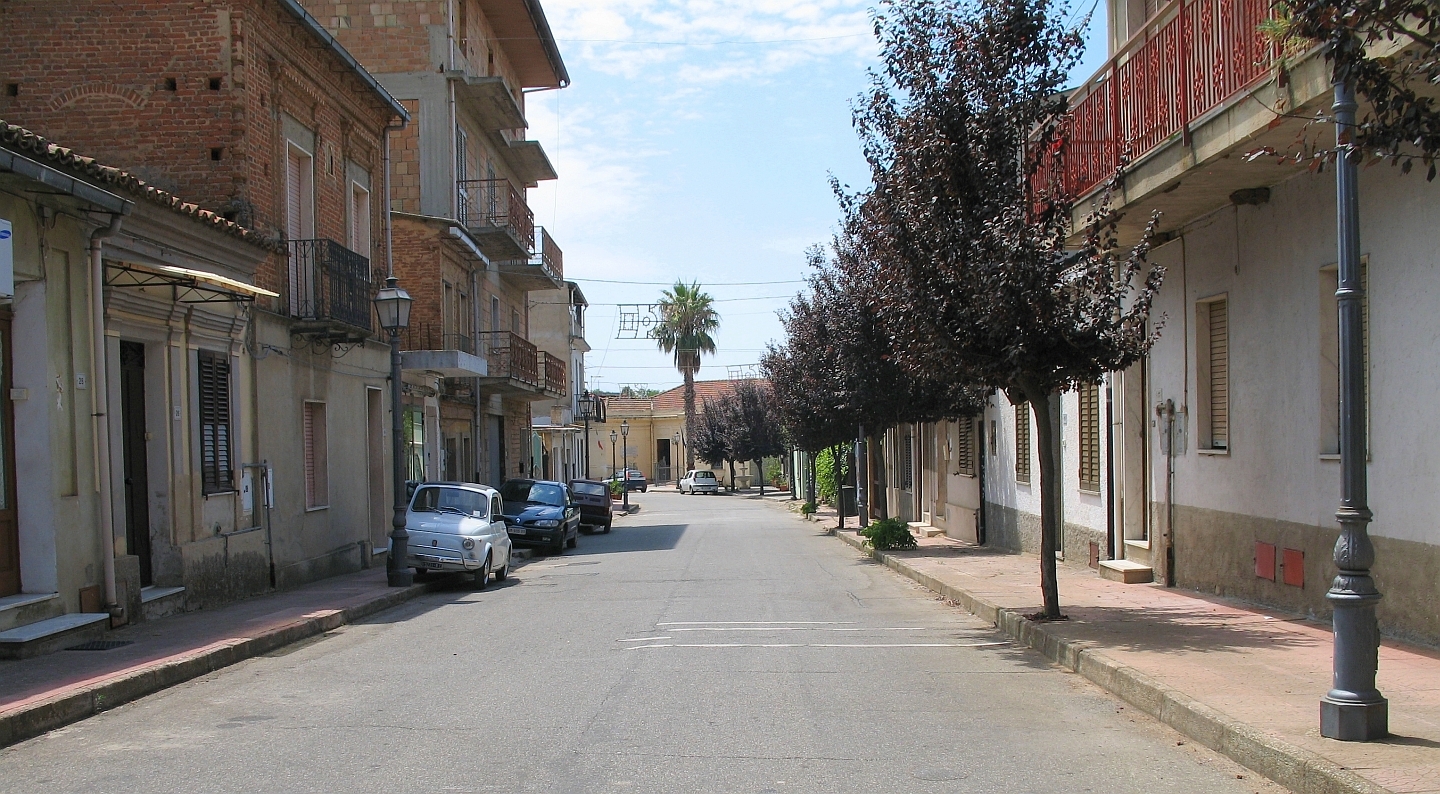
- Main street

- Location within Italy Location within Calabria
- Coordinates: 38°30′N 16°5′E
- Country: Italy
- Region: Calabria
- Metropolitan city: Reggio Calabria (RC)

Government
  - Mayor: Vincenzo Cavallaro

Area
  - Total: 26.6 km^{2} (10.3 sq mi)
- Elevation: 239 m (784 ft)

Population (30 April 2011)
  - Total: 389
  - Density: 14.6/km^{2} (37.9/sq mi)
- Demonym: Candidonesi
- Time zone: UTC+1 (CET)
  - Summer (DST): UTC+2 (CEST)
- Postal code: 89020
- Dialing code: 0966
- Website: Official website

Candidoni (Greek: Anthedon) is a comune (municipality) in the Metropolitan City of Reggio Calabria in the Italian region Calabria, located about 60 kilometres (37 mi) southwest of Catanzaro and about 60 kilometres (37 mi) northeast of Reggio Calabria.

== Geography ==
Candidoni borders the following municipalities: Laureana di Borrello, Limbadi, Mileto, Nicotera, Rosarno, San Calogero, Serrata.

== Demographics ==
Historical population

Year	Pop.	±%
1861	481	—
1871	452	−6.0%
1881	408	−9.7%
1901	548	+34.3%
1911	579	+5.7%

Year	Pop.	±%
1921	653	+12.8%
1931	774	+18.5%
1936	995	+28.6%
1951	1,072	+7.7%
1961	982	−8.4%

Year	Pop.	±%
1971	743	−24.3%
1981	563	−24.2%
1991	497	−11.7%
2001	410	−17.5%
2011	389	−5.1%

Source: Data from ISTAT
