= Francica =

- Comune
- Comune di Francica
- Location within Italy Location within Calabria
- Coordinates: 38°37′N 16°6′E
- Country: Italy
- Region: Calabria
- Province: Province of Vibo Valentia (VV)

Area
  - Total: 22.7 km^{2} (8.8 sq mi)

Population (Dec. 2004)
  - Total: 2,000 (approx.)
  - Density: 88/km^{2} (230/sq mi)
- Time zone: UTC+1 (CET)
  - Summer (DST): UTC+2 (CEST)
- Postal code: 89851
- Dialing code: 0963

Francica is a comune (municipality) in the Province of Vibo Valentia in the Italian region Calabria, located about 50 kilometres (31 mi) southwest of Catanzaro and about 6 kilometres (4 mi) south of Vibo Valentia. As of 31 December 2004, it had a population of 1,666 and an area of 22.7 square kilometres (8.8 mi^{2}).

Francica borders the following municipalities: Gerocarne, Mileto, San Costantino Calabro, San Gregorio d'Ippona, Stefanaconi, Vibo Valentia.

== Demographic evolution ==
Historical population

Year	Pop.	±%
1861	1,264	—
1871	1,194	−5.5%
1881	1,258	+5.4%
1901	1,539	+22.3%
1911	1,686	+9.6%

Year	Pop.	±%
1921	1,889	+12.0%
1931	1,881	−0.4%
1936	1,898	+0.9%
1951	2,225	+17.2%
1961	2,052	−7.8%

Year	Pop.	±%
1971	1,918	−6.5%
1981	1,781	−7.1%
1991	1,852	+4.0%
2001	1,670	−9.8%

Source: Data from ISTAT
