= Acquaro =

- Comune
- Comune di Acquaro
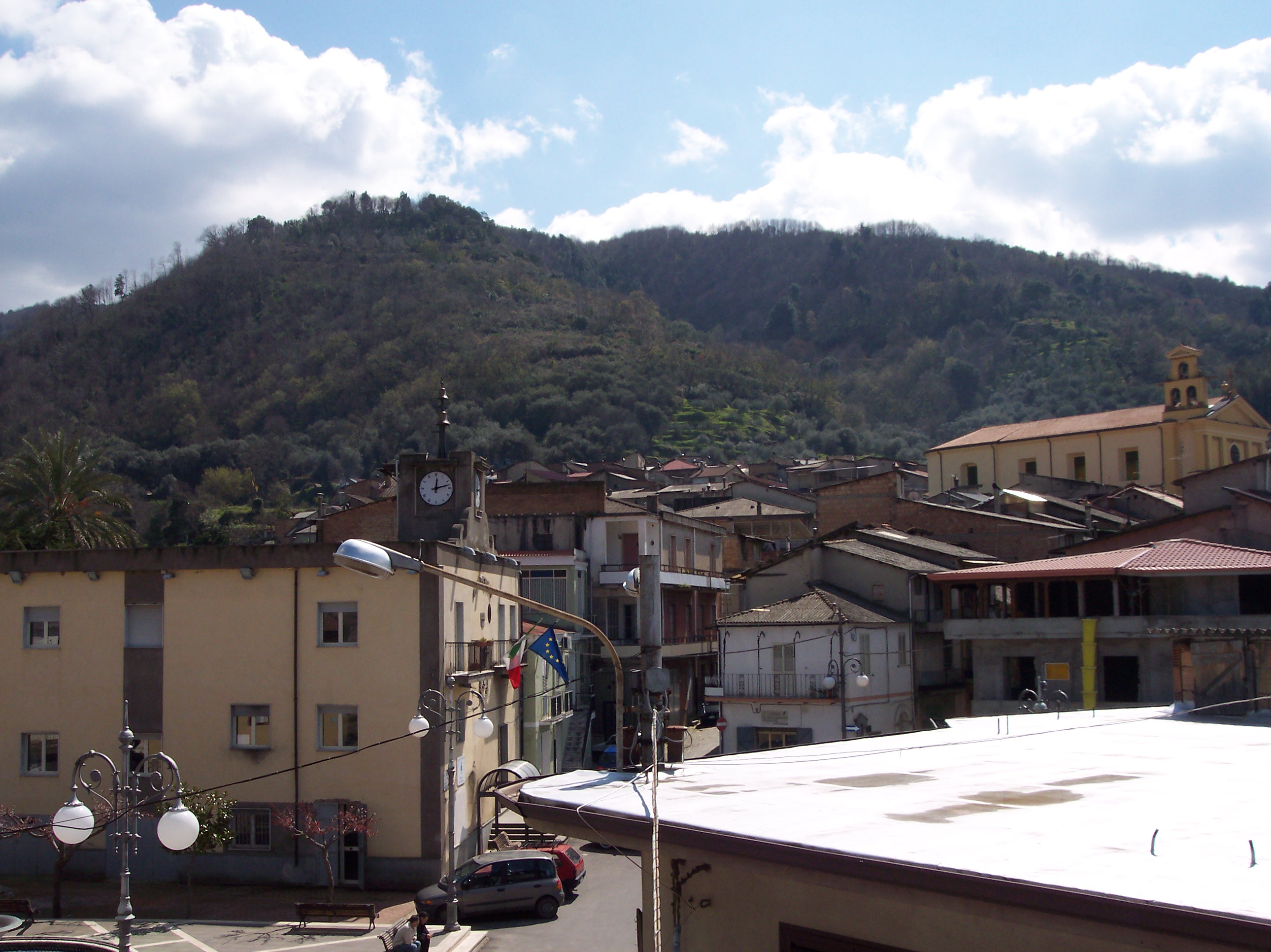

- Location of Acquaro in Italy Acquaro (Calabria)
- Coordinates: 38°33′N 16°11′E
- Country: Italy
- Region: Calabria
- Province: Vibo Valentia (VV)
- Frazioni: Fellari, Limpidi, Piani di Acquaro

Government
  - Mayor: Giuseppe Barillaro

Area
  - Total: 25.3 km^{2} (9.8 sq mi)
- Elevation: 262 m (860 ft)

Population (31 March 2016)
  - Total: 2,465
  - Density: 97.4/km^{2} (252/sq mi)
- Demonym: Acquaroti
- Time zone: UTC+1 (CET)
  - Summer (DST): UTC+2 (CEST)
- Postal code: 89832
- Dialing code: 0963
- Patron saint: Saint Rocco
- Saint day: August 16

Acquaro (Calabrian: Accuàru) is a comune (municipality) in the Province of Vibo Valentia in the Italian region Calabria, located about 50 kilometres (31 mi) southwest of Catanzaro and about 15 kilometres (9 mi) southeast of Vibo Valentia.

== Geography ==
Acquaro borders the following municipalities: Arena, Dasà, Dinami, Fabrizia, San Pietro di Caridà.

== Demographics ==
Historical population

Year	Pop.	±%
1861	2,194	—
1871	2,216	+1.0%
1881	2,086	−5.9%
1901	2,711	+30.0%
1911	2,777	+2.4%

Year	Pop.	±%
1921	3,115	+12.2%
1931	3,541	+13.7%
1936	3,743	+5.7%
1951	4,327	+15.6%
1961	4,258	−1.6%

Year	Pop.	±%
1971	4,072	−4.4%
1981	3,293	−19.1%
1991	3,293	+0.0%
2001	3,046	−7.5%
2011	2,448	−19.6%

Source: Data from ISTAT
