= San Pietro di Caridà =

San Pietro di Caridà Καρυδιά (Greek)
- Comune
- Comune di San Pietro di Caridà
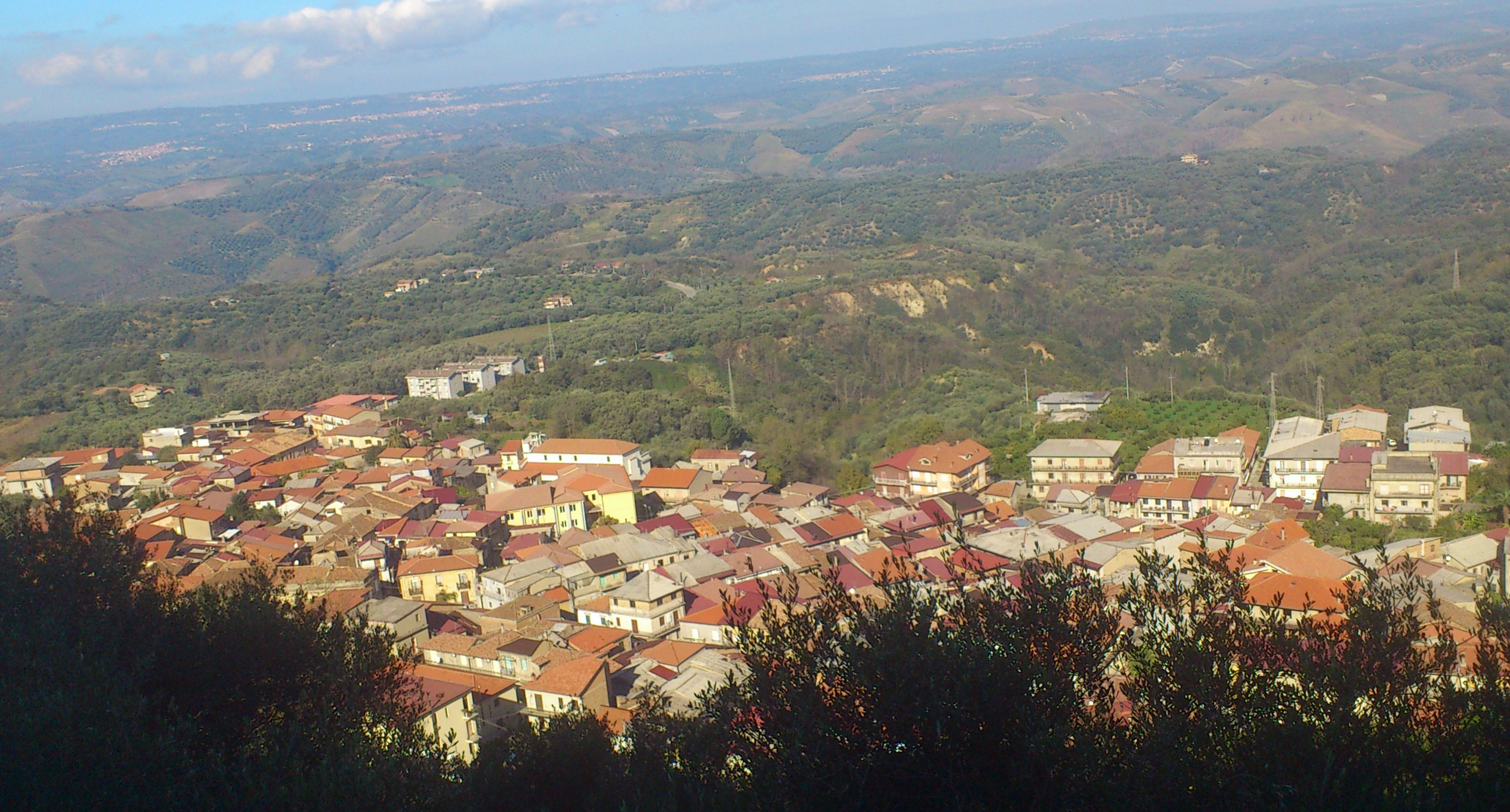

- Location within Italy Location within Calabria
- Coordinates: 38°31′N 16°8′E
- Country: Italy
- Region: Calabria
- Metropolitan city: Reggio Calabria (RC)
- Frazioni: Corruttò, Garopoli, Misi-Miz, Prateria, San Pierfedele

Government
  - Mayor: Mario Masso

Area
  - Total: 47.8 km^{2} (18.5 sq mi)
- Elevation: 325 m (1,066 ft)

Population (1 January 2014)
  - Total: 1,233
  - Density: 25.8/km^{2} (66.8/sq mi)
- Demonym: Caridaresi
- Time zone: UTC+1 (CET)
  - Summer (DST): UTC+2 (CEST)
- Postal code: 89020
- Dialing code: 0966
- Website: Official website

San Pietro di Caridà (Calabrian Greek: Καρυδιά, romanized: Karydiá) is a comune (municipality) in the Metropolitan City of Reggio Calabria in the Italian region Calabria, located about 60 kilometres (37 mi) southwest of Catanzaro and about 60 kilometres (37 mi) northeast of Reggio Calabria.

== Geography ==
San Pietro di Caridà borders the following municipalities: Acquaro, Dinami, Fabrizia, Galatro, Laureana di Borrello, Serrata.

== Demographics ==
Historical population

| Year | Pop. | ±% |
|---|---|---|
| 1861 | 1,696 | — |
| 1871 | 1,577 | −7.0% |
| 1881 | 1,428 | −9.4% |
| 1901 | 1,814 | +27.0% |
| 1911 | 2,049 | +13.0% |

| Year | Pop. | ±% |
|---|---|---|
| 1921 | 2,180 | +6.4% |
| 1931 | 2,485 | +14.0% |
| 1936 | 2,578 | +3.7% |
| 1951 | 2,890 | +12.1% |
| 1961 | 2,778 | −3.9% |

| Year | Pop. | ±% |
|---|---|---|
| 1971 | 2,351 | −15.4% |
| 1981 | 2,014 | −14.3% |
| 1991 | 1,980 | −1.7% |
| 2001 | 1,715 | −13.4% |
| 2011 | 1,265 | −26.2% |

Source: Data from ISTAT
