= Pizzoni =

- Comune
- Comune di Pizzoni
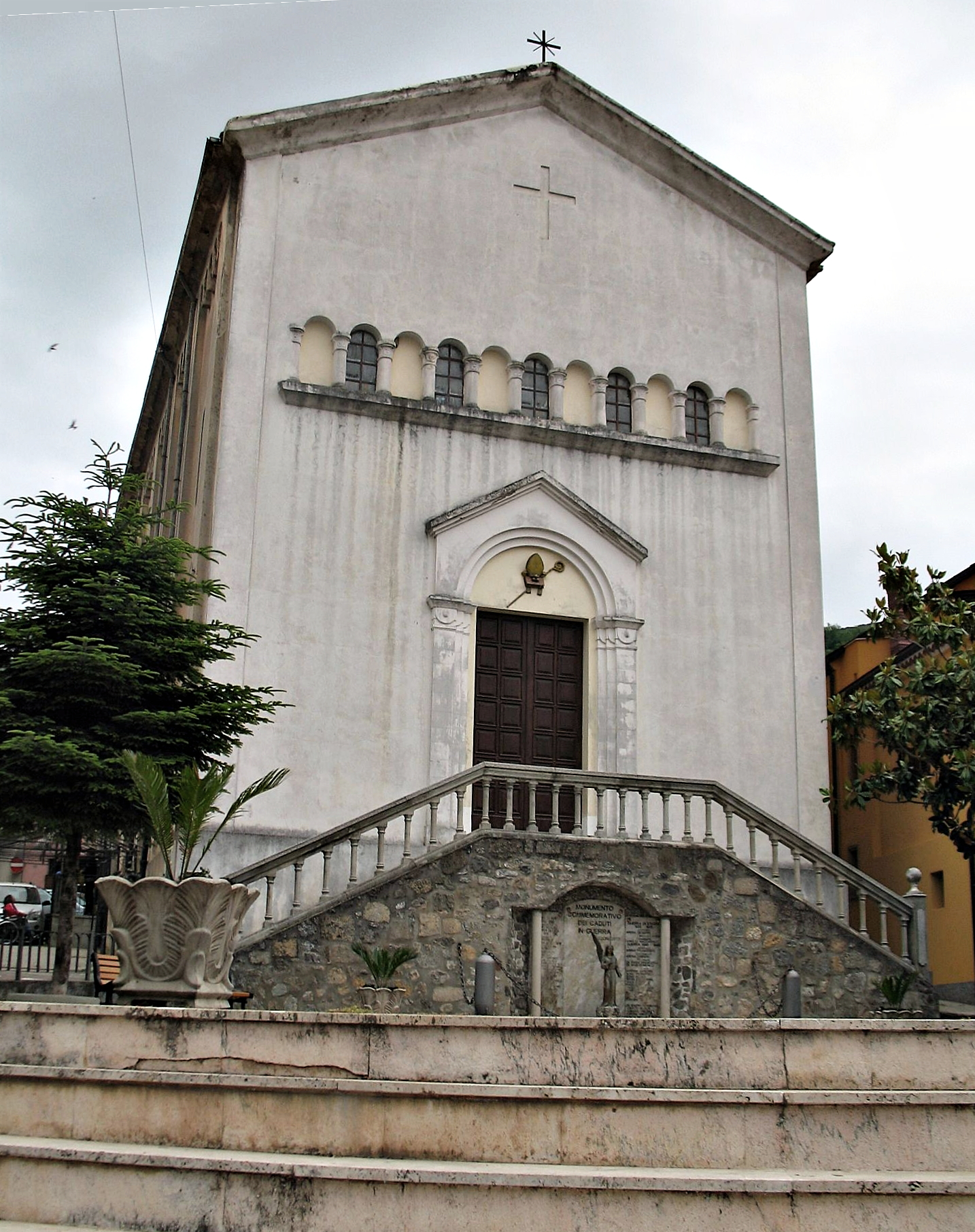
- Church in Pizzoni

- Coat of arms

- Location within Italy Location within Calabria
- Coordinates: 38°37′N 16°15′E
- Country: Italy
- Region: Calabria
- Province: Vibo Valentia (VV)

Government
  - Mayor: Tiziana De Nardo

Area
  - Total: 21.7 km^{2} (8.4 sq mi)
- Elevation: 250 m (820 ft)

Population (31 December 2015)
  - Total: 1,146
  - Density: 52.8/km^{2} (137/sq mi)
- Demonym: Pizzonesi
- Time zone: UTC+1 (CET)
  - Summer (DST): UTC+2 (CEST)
- Postal code: 88010
- Dialing code: 0963
- Website: Official website

Pizzoni (Calabrian: Pìzzuni) is a comune (municipality) in the Province of Vibo Valentia in the Italian region Calabria, located about 45 kilometres (28 mi) southwest of Catanzaro and about 15 kilometres (9 mi) southeast of Vibo Valentia.

Pizzoni borders the following municipalities: Simbario, Sorianello, Soriano Calabro, Stefanaconi, Vazzano.
