= Spadola =

- Comune
- Comune di Spadola
- Location within Italy Location within Calabria
- Coordinates: 38°36′N 16°20′E
- Country: Italy
- Region: Calabria
- Province: Province of Vibo Valentia (VV)

Area
  - Total: 9.6 km^{2} (3.7 sq mi)

Population (Dec. 2004)
  - Total: 813
  - Density: 85/km^{2} (220/sq mi)
- Time zone: UTC+1 (CET)
  - Summer (DST): UTC+2 (CEST)
- Postal code: 88020
- Dialing code: 0963

Spadola (Calabrian: Spàtula) is a municipality (comune) in the Province of Vibo Valentia in the Italian region Calabria, located about 40 kilometres (25 mi) southwest of Catanzaro and about 25 kilometres (16 mi) southeast of Vibo Valentia. As of 31 December 2004, it had a population of 813 and an area of 9.6 square kilometres (3.7 mi^{2}).

Spadola borders the following municipalities: Brognaturo, Gerocarne, Serra San Bruno, Simbario, Sorianello, Stilo.

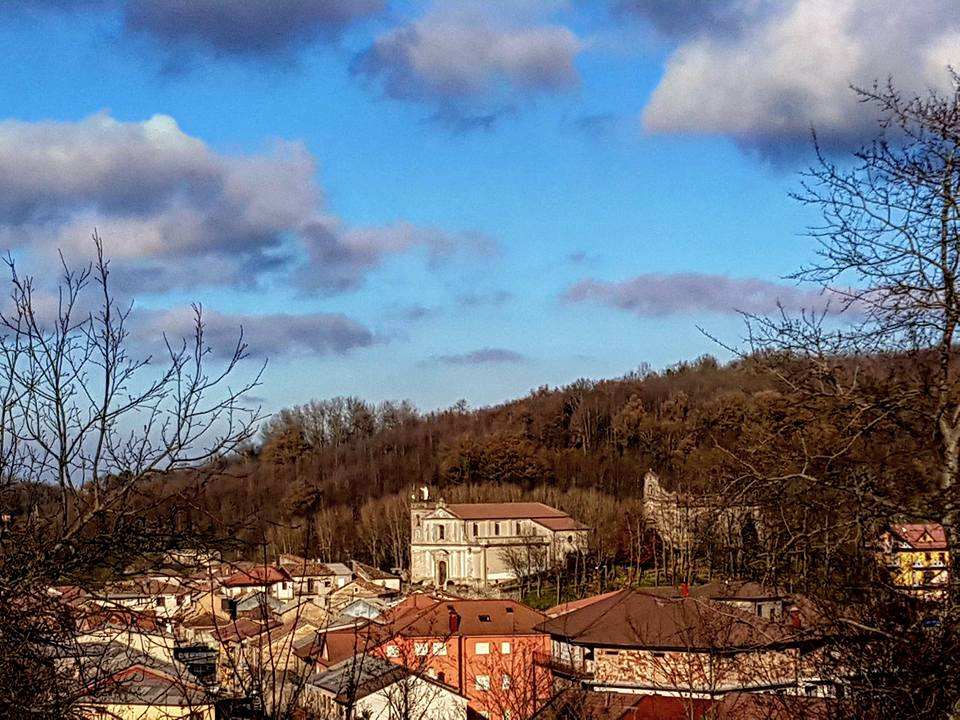

== Demographic evolution ==
In 1961 Spadola had just 937 inhabitants. But in the year 1971 it raised down to 797 inhabitants. Many families had emigrated to the Palatinate town of Zweibrücken for founding a pizzeria very popular at this time.

Historical population

Year	Pop.	±%
1861	811	—
1871	763	−5.9%
1881	751	−1.6%
1901	788	+4.9%
1911	853	+8.2%

Year	Pop.	±%
1921	892	+4.6%
1931	920	+3.1%
1936	880	−4.3%
1951	919	+4.4%
1961	937	+2.0%

Year	Pop.	±%
1971	797	−14.9%
1981	771	−3.3%
1991	821	+6.5%
2001	819	−0.2%

Source: Data from ISTAT
