= San Nicola da Crissa =

San Nicola da Crissa Greek: Aghios Nikolaos Chryssis
- Comune
- Comune di San Nicola da Crissa
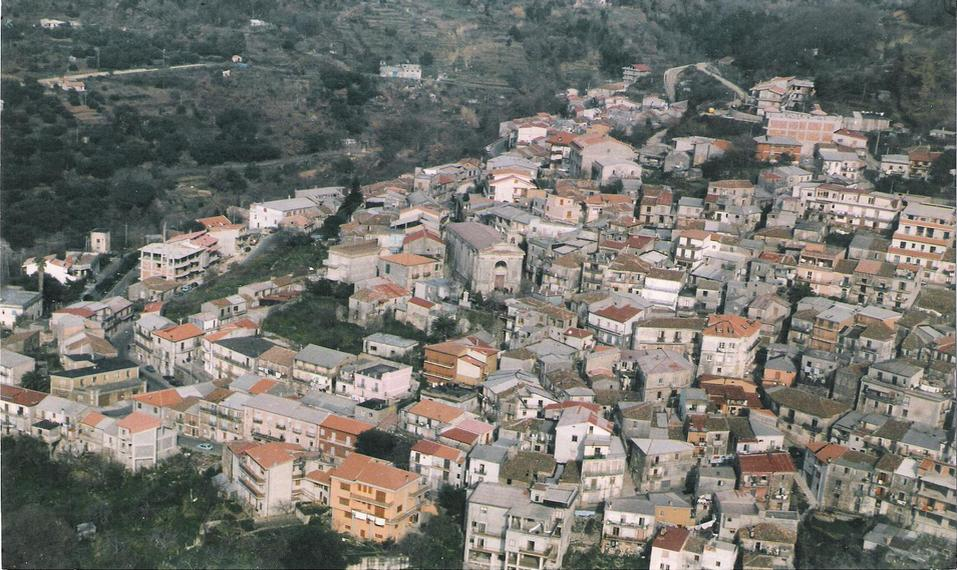

- Coat of arms

- Location within Italy Location within Calabria
- Coordinates: 38°40′N 16°17′E
- Country: Italy
- Region: Calabria
- Province: Vibo Valentia (VV)

Government
  - Mayor: Stefano Malfara

Area
  - Total: 19.3 km^{2} (7.5 sq mi)
- Elevation: 518 m (1,699 ft)

Population (31 December 2010)
  - Total: 1,437
  - Density: 74.5/km^{2} (193/sq mi)
- Demonym: Sannicolesi
- Time zone: UTC+1 (CET)
  - Summer (DST): UTC+2 (CEST)
- Postal code: 89821
- Dialing code: 0963

San Nicola da Crissa (Greek: Aghios Nikolaos Chryssis) is a comune (municipality) in the Province of Vibo Valentia in the Italian region Calabria, located about 40 kilometres (25 mi) southwest of Catanzaro and about 15 kilometres (9 mi) east of Vibo Valentia.

San Nicola da Crissa borders the following municipalities: Capistrano, Filogaso, Torre di Ruggiero, Vallelonga.

== Demographic evolution ==
Historical population

Year	Pop.	±%
1861	2,184	—
1871	2,219	+1.6%
1881	2,328	+4.9%
1901	2,812	+20.8%
1911	3,090	+9.9%

Year	Pop.	±%
1921	3,042	−1.6%
1931	3,702	+21.7%
1936	3,391	−8.4%
1951	4,233	+24.8%
1961	3,409	−19.5%

Year	Pop.	±%
1971	2,591	−24.0%
1981	1,940	−25.1%
1991	1,887	−2.7%
2001	1,599	−15.3%

Source: Data from ISTAT
