= Arena, Calabria =

Arena
- Comune
- Comune di Arena
- Location within Italy Location within Calabria
- Coordinates: 38°34′N 16°13′E
- Country: Italy
- Region: Calabria
- Province: Province of Vibo Valentia (VV)

Area
  - Total: 32.4 km^{2} (12.5 sq mi)

Population (Dec 2021)
  - Total: 1,253
  - Density: 38.7/km^{2} (100/sq mi)
- Time zone: UTC+1 (CET)
  - Summer (DST): UTC+2 (CEST)
- Postal code: 89832
- Dialing code: 0963
- Website: Official website

Arena is a comune (municipality) in the Province of Vibo Valentia in the Italian region Calabria, located about 31 miles (50 km) southwest of Catanzaro and about 9 miles (14 km) southeast of Vibo Valentia. As of December 31, 2021, it had a population of 1,253 and an area of 89.1 inhabitants per square mile (34.4/km^{2}).

Arena borders the following municipalities: Acquaro, Dasà, Fabrizia, Gerocarne, Mongiana, Serra San Bruno.

== History ==
Arena existed during the Roman Era, however the town was known as ‘Castrum Arenese’ instead.

It was conquered by the Normans during the 11th century and assigned to Ruggero Conclubeth (son of Ruggero II) sometime in the 1100s. During this time, it assumed political importance in the mountains shown by the Norman Castle imposing upon the town, still to this day, and still visitable.

After much time governing the town, the Conclubeth family passed Arena through marriage to the Acquaviva of Aragona family in 1678. This reign was followed by the Dukes of Atri, who after a war broke out with Austria, sold Arena to the Caracciolo family during the 18th century.

Arena soon had unfair politics towards the population which caused terrible debts to the town with the state treasury.

Interesting enough, Arena soon became a center for silk production in the region.

During the 19th and 20th centuries the population steadily rose, eventually hitting its peak during the 1950s, then declining due to post-war immigration out of Europe to countries such as the United States, Australia and Argentina, with the population declining ever since due to various reasons.

Historical population

Year	Pop.	±%
1861	2,381	—
1871	2,453	+3.0%
1881	2,448	−0.2%
1901	2,892	+18.1%
1911	3,048	+5.4%

Year	Pop.	±%
1921	3,282	+7.7%
1931	3,190	−2.8%
1936	3,146	−1.4%
1951	3,565	+13.3%
1961	3,091	−13.3%

Year	Pop.	±%
1971	2,706	−12.5%
1981	2,338	−13.6%
1991	2,069	−11.5%
2001	1,799	−13.0%

Source: Data from ISTAT
