= Soriano Calabro =

- Comune
- Comune di Soriano Calabro
- Location within Italy Location within Calabria
- Coordinates: 38°36′N 16°14′E
- Country: Italy
- Region: Calabria
- Province: Province of Vibo Valentia (VV)

Area
  - Total: 15.2 km^{2} (5.9 sq mi)

Population (Dec. 2004)
  - Total: 2,975
  - Density: 196/km^{2} (507/sq mi)
- Time zone: UTC+1 (CET)
  - Summer (DST): UTC+2 (CEST)
- Postal code: 88017
- Dialing code: 0963

Soriano Calabro (Calabrian: Suriano) is a comune (municipality) in the Province of Vibo Valentia in the Italian region Calabria, located about 45 kilometres (28 mi) southwest of Catanzaro and about 15 kilometres (9 mi) southeast of Vibo Valentia. As of 31 December 2004, it had a population of 2,975 and an area of 15.2 square kilometres (5.9 mi^{2}).

Soriano Calabro was founded by a group of monks composed mostly of Syrians and also Egyptians who migrated to the Italian Peninsula in the 10th century. The monks were permitted to settle in three different places, in Lazio, Sicily and Calabria. Those who settled in Calabria founded the town of Soriano Calabro, originally naming it Soriano, which was taken from the name of the country Syria (سوريا sūryā in Arabic) and hence meant 'Syrian', which at that time in Italian was written as 'Sòriano'.

In 1510, Dominican brothers founded a priory at Soriano Calabro. From 1530, and for at least about 130 years, their most precious possession was the miraculous portrait of Saint Dominic in Soriano.

Soriano Calabro borders the following municipalities: Gerocarne, Pizzoni, Sorianello, Stefanaconi.
