= San Gregorio d'Ippona =

San Gregorio d'Ippona Agios Gregorios Ipponias (Greek)
- Comune
- Comune di San Gregorio d'Ippona
- Location within Italy Location within Calabria
- Coordinates: 38°39′N 16°6′E
- Country: Italy
- Region: Calabria
- Province: Province of Vibo Valentia (VV)

Area
  - Total: 12.4 km^{2} (4.8 sq mi)

Population (Dec. 2004)
  - Total: 2,278
  - Density: 184/km^{2} (476/sq mi)
- Time zone: UTC+1 (CET)
  - Summer (DST): UTC+2 (CEST)
- Postal code: 88010
- Dialing code: 0963

San Gregorio d'Ippona (Greek: Agios Gregorios Ipponias) is a comune (municipality) in the Province of Vibo Valentia in the Italian region Calabria, located about 50 kilometres (31 mi) southwest of Catanzaro and about 2 kilometres (1 mi) southeast of Vibo Valentia. As of 31 December 2004, it had a population of 2,278 and an area of 12.4 square kilometres (4.8 mi^{2}).

San Gregorio d'Ippona borders the following municipalities: Francica, Jonadi, San Costantino Calabro, and Vibo Valentia.

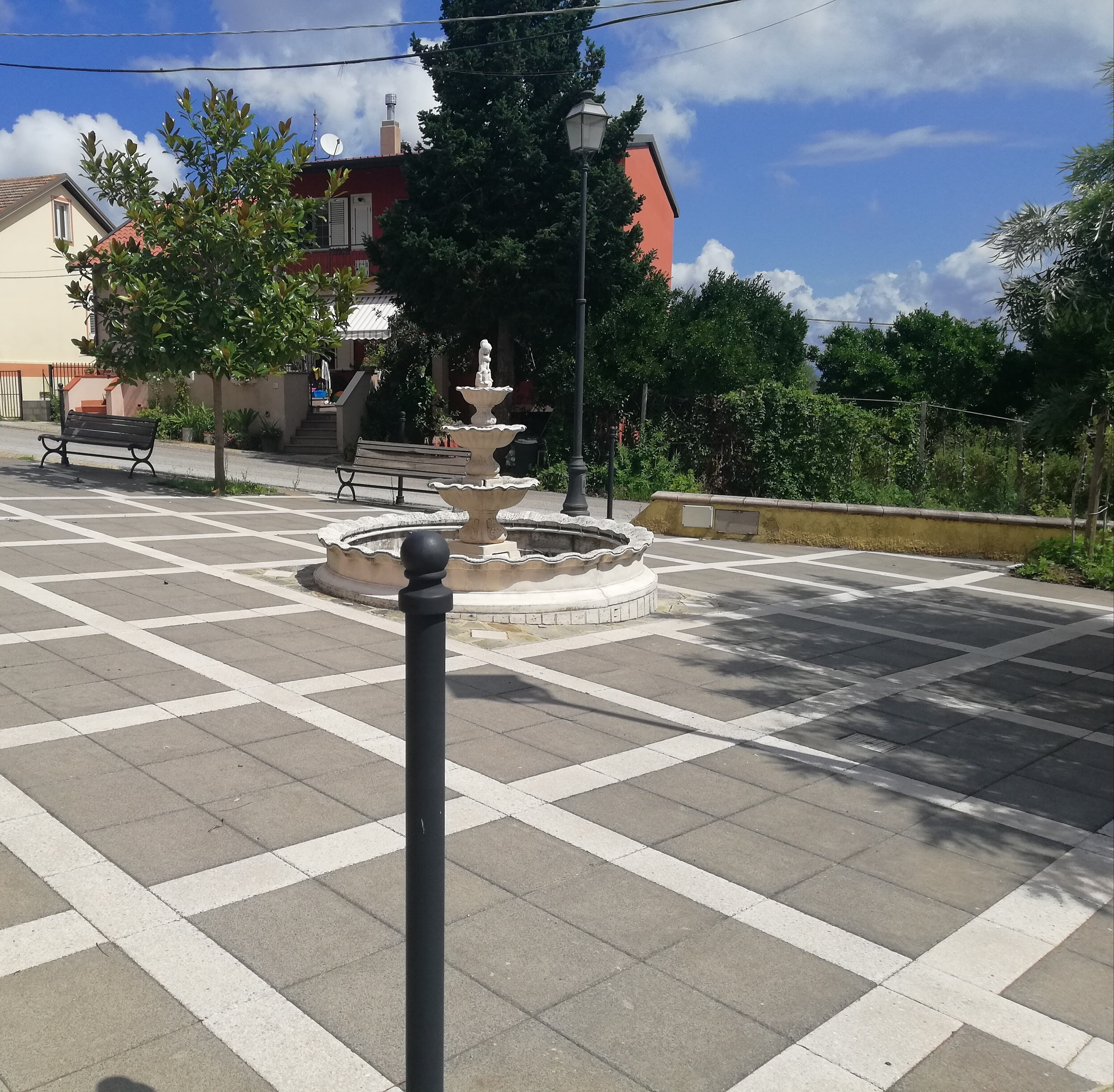
Queen Elena Square

== Demographic evolution ==
Historical population

Year	Pop.	±%
1861	1,944	—
1871	1,565	−19.5%
1881	1,479	−5.5%
1901	1,654	+11.8%
1911	1,659	+0.3%

Year	Pop.	±%
1921	2,011	+21.2%
1931	2,156	+7.2%
1936	2,211	+2.6%
1951	2,586	+17.0%
1961	2,404	−7.0%

Year	Pop.	±%
1971	2,379	−1.0%
1981	2,437	+2.4%
1991	2,438	+0.0%
2001	2,338	−4.1%

Source: Data from ISTAT
