= Gerocarne =

Gerocarne Greek: Hierakarés
- Comune
- Comune di Gerocarne
- Location within Italy Location within Calabria
- Coordinates: 38°35′N 16°13′E
- Country: Italy
- Region: Calabria
- Province: Province of Vibo Valentia (VV)
- Frazioni: Ariola, Ciano, Sant'Angelo

Area
  - Total: 44.9 km^{2} (17.3 sq mi)

Population (Dec. 2004)
  - Total: 2,391
  - Density: 53.3/km^{2} (138/sq mi)
- Demonym: Gerocarnesi
- Time zone: UTC+1 (CET)
  - Summer (DST): UTC+2 (CEST)
- Postal code: 89831
- Dialing code: 0963
- Patron saint: San Rocco

Gerocarne (Calabrian: Riuracàrne) is a comune (municipality) in the Province of Vibo Valentia in the Italian region Calabria, located about 50 kilometres (31 mi) southwest of Catanzaro and about 15 kilometres (9 mi) southeast of Vibo Valentia. As of 31 December 2004, it had a population of 2,391 and an area of 44.9 square kilometres (17.3 mi^{2}).

Gerocarne borders the following municipalities: Arena, Dasà, Dinami, Francica, Mileto, Serra San Bruno, Sorianello, Soriano Calabro, Spadola, Stefanaconi.

== Demographic evolution ==
Historical population

Year	Pop.	±%
1861	1,534	—
1871	1,665	+8.5%
1881	1,542	−7.4%
1901	2,062	+33.7%
1911	2,331	+13.0%

Year	Pop.	±%
1921	2,597	+11.4%
1931	3,096	+19.2%
1936	3,321	+7.3%
1951	4,221	+27.1%
1961	3,896	−7.7%

Year	Pop.	±%
1971	3,002	−22.9%
1981	3,023	+0.7%
1991	3,127	+3.4%
2001	2,498	−20.1%

Source: Data from ISTAT
