= Pezzo =

Pezzo may refer to:

- Pezzo, in music a synonym of composition
- Paola Pezzo, a cross-country mountain bike racer from Verona, Italy
- Punta Pezzo, a point in Reggio Calabria, southern Italy
- Pezzo capriccioso, composition of Pyotr Ilyich Tchaikovsky
- Gayle Pezzo, American politician

== See also ==
- Del Pezzo (disambiguation)
