= Dinami =

Dinami Δύναμις (Greek)
- Comune
- Comune di Dinami
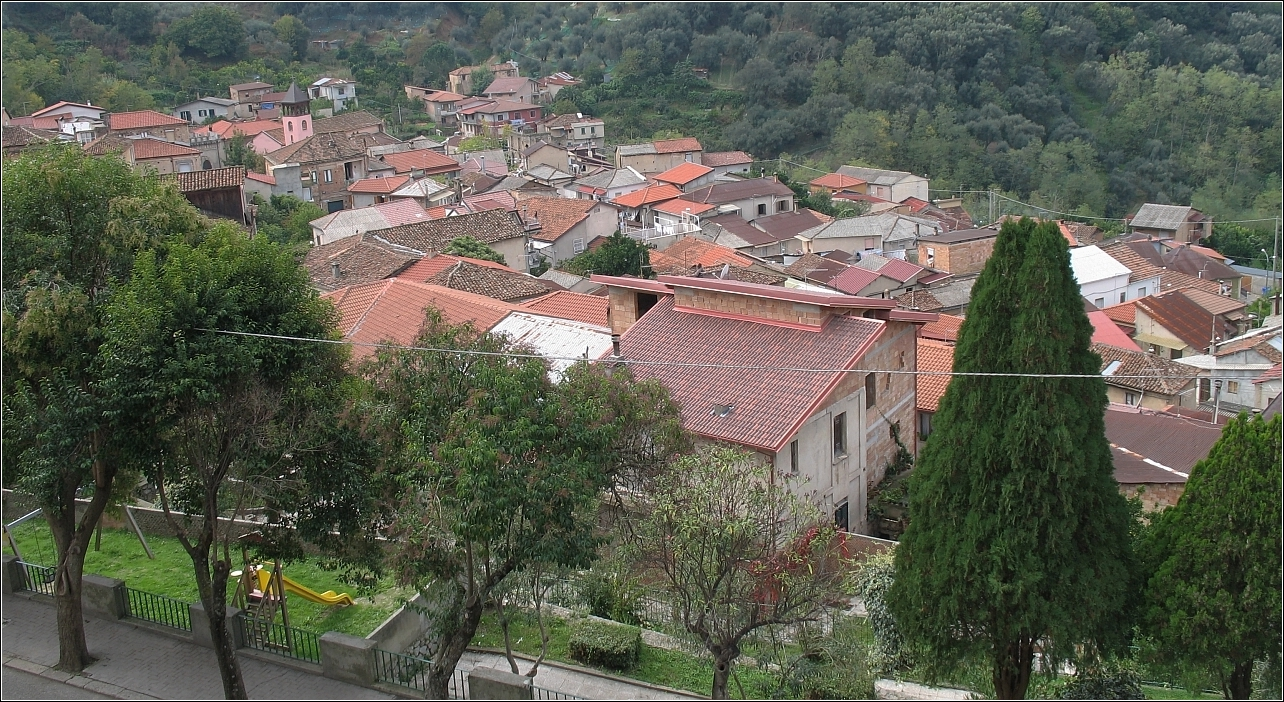

- Location within Italy Location within Calabria
- Coordinates: 38°32′N 16°9′E
- Country: Italy
- Region: Calabria
- Province: Province of Vibo Valentia (VV)
- Frazioni: Melicuccà, Monsoreto

Government
  - Mayor: Francesco Cavallaro

Area
  - Total: 44.1 km^{2} (17.0 sq mi)
- Elevation: 260 m (850 ft)

Population (Dec. 2004)
  - Total: 3,258
  - Density: 73.9/km^{2} (191/sq mi)
- Demonym: Dinamesi
- Time zone: UTC+1 (CET)
  - Summer (DST): UTC+2 (CEST)
- Postal code: 89833
- Dialing code: 0966
- Patron saint: Maria della Catena
- Website: Official website mapy = 16.1500

Dinami (Calabrian Greek: Δύναμις) is a comune (municipality) in the Province of Vibo Valentia in the Italian region Calabria, located about 90 kilometres (56 mi) southwest of Catanzaro and about 32 kilometres (20 mi) southeast of Vibo Valentia. As of 31 December 2004, it had a population of 3,258 and an area of 44.1 square kilometres (17.0 mi^{2}).

The municipality of Dinami contains the frazioni (subdivisions, mainly villages and hamlets) Melicuccà and Monsoreto.

Dinami borders the following municipalities: Acquaro, Dasà, Gerocarne, Mileto, San Pietro di Caridà, Serrata.

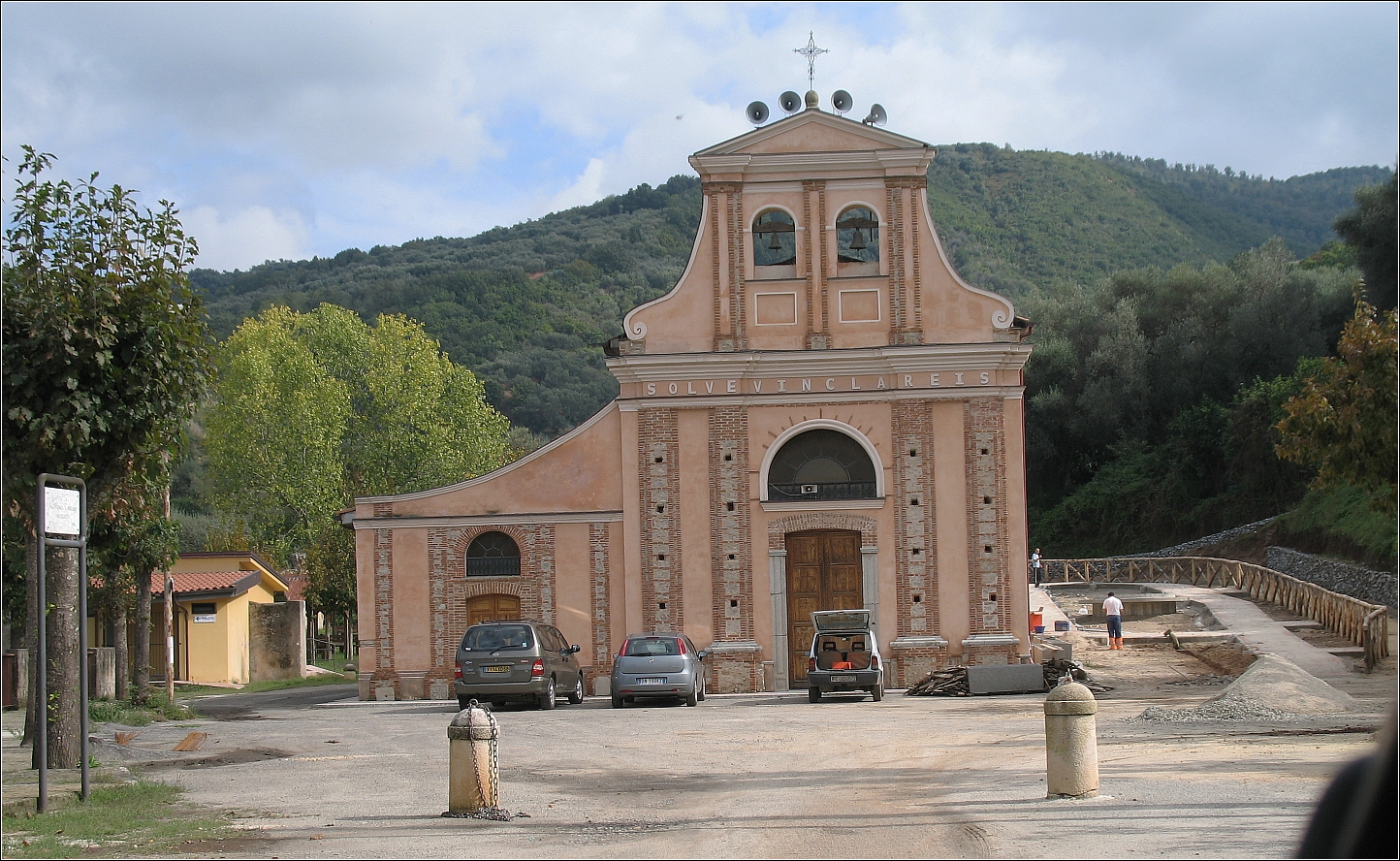
Mary's Catena Sanctuary

== Demographic evolution ==
Historical population

| Year | Pop. | ±% |
|---|---|---|
| 1861 | 1,604 | — |
| 1871 | 1,633 | +1.8% |
| 1881 | 1,591 | −2.6% |
| 1901 | 2,500 | +57.1% |
| 1911 | 2,903 | +16.1% |

| Year | Pop. | ±% |
|---|---|---|
| 1921 | 3,217 | +10.8% |
| 1931 | 3,449 | +7.2% |
| 1936 | 3,622 | +5.0% |
| 1951 | 4,126 | +13.9% |
| 1961 | 4,331 | +5.0% |

| Year | Pop. | ±% |
|---|---|---|
| 1971 | 4,021 | −7.2% |
| 1981 | 3,250 | −19.2% |
| 1991 | 3,245 | −0.2% |
| 2001 | 3,544 | +9.2% |

Source: Data from ISTAT
