= Sorianello =

- Comune
- Comune di Sorianello
- Location within Italy Location within Calabria
- Coordinates: 38°36′N 16°14′E
- Country: Italy
- Region: Calabria
- Province: Province of Vibo Valentia (VV)

Area
  - Total: 9.7 km^{2} (3.7 sq mi)

Population (January, 2025)
  - Total: 1,085
  - Density: 110/km^{2} (290/sq mi)
- Time zone: UTC+1 (CET)
  - Summer (DST): UTC+2 (CEST)
- Postal code: 88010
- Dialing code: 0963

Sorianello is a comune (municipality) in the Province of Vibo Valentia in the Italian region Calabria, located about 45 kilometres (28 mi) southwest of Catanzaro and about 15 kilometres (9 mi) southeast of Vibo Valentia. As of 31 January 2025, it had a population of 1,085 and an area of 9.7 square kilometres (3.7 mi^{2}).

Sorianello borders the following municipalities: Gerocarne, Pizzoni, Simbario, Soriano Calabro, Spadola.

== Demographic evolution ==
Historical population

Year	Pop.	±%
1861	1,441	—
1871	1,515	+5.1%
1881	1,246	−17.8%
1901	1,465	+17.6%
1911	1,631	+11.3%

Year	Pop.	±%
1921	1,642	+0.7%
1931	1,729	+5.3%
1936	1,772	+2.5%
1951	1,956	+10.4%
1961	2,010	+2.8%

Year	Pop.	±%
1971	1,811	−9.9%
1981	1,693	−6.5%
1991	1,654	−2.3%
2001	1,589	−3.9%

Source: Data from ISTAT
