= Simbario =

Simbario Symbarion (Greek)
- Comune
- Comune di Simbario
- Location within Italy Location within Calabria
- Coordinates: 38°37′N 16°20′E
- Country: Italy
- Region: Calabria
- Province: Vibo Valentia (VV)

Government
  - Mayor: Ovidio F. Romano

Area
  - Total: 20.83 km^{2} (8.04 sq mi)
- Elevation: 766 m (2,513 ft)

Population (31 August 2011)
  - Total: 968
  - Density: 46.5/km^{2} (120/sq mi)
- Demonym: Simbariani
- Time zone: UTC+1 (CET)
  - Summer (DST): UTC+2 (CEST)
- Postal code: 89822
- Dialing code: 0963
- Patron saint: St. Roch
- Website: Official website

Simbario (Calabrian: Zimbarìu; Greek: Symbarion, Synvarion) is a comune (municipality) in the Province of Vibo Valentia in the Italian region Calabria, located about 40 kilometres (25 mi) southwest of Catanzaro and about 20 kilometres (12 mi) east of Vibo Valentia.

Simbario borders the following municipalities: Brognaturo, Spadola, Cardinale, Pizzoni, Sorianello, Torre di Ruggiero, Vallelonga, Vazzano.
