= Del Pezzo =

Del Pezzo may refer to:

- Del Pezzo surface
- Pasquale del Pezzo
- Del Pezzo Restaurant
