= Serrata =

Serrata (serrated (saw-like) in Latin) may refer to:

- Ora serrata, the serrated junction between the retina and the ciliary body
- Serrata (bridle), a kind of hackamore bridle used by Hispanic riders, including in the United States
- Serrata (gastropod), a sea snail genus in the family Marginellidae
- Serrata, Italy, a comune in the Province of Reggio Calabria
- Sutura serrata, a type of suture in anatomy

== See also ==
- Serrata del Maggior Consiglio, the constitutional process, started in 1297, by which membership of the Great Council of Venice became an hereditary title
