= Sant'Onofrio, Calabria =

Sant'Onofrio
- Comune
- Comune di Sant'Onofrio
- Location within Italy Location within Calabria
- Coordinates: 38°42′N 16°9′E
- Country: Italy
- Region: Calabria
- Province: Province of Vibo Valentia (VV)

Area
  - Total: 18.4 km^{2} (7.1 sq mi)

Population (Dec. 2004)
  - Total: 3,202
  - Density: 174/km^{2} (451/sq mi)
- Time zone: UTC+1 (CET)
  - Summer (DST): UTC+2 (CEST)
- Postal code: 89843
- Dialing code: 0963

Sant'Onofrio (Calabrian: Santu 'nòfhriu) is a comune (municipality) in the Province of Vibo Valentia in the Italian region Calabria, located about 45 kilometres (28 mi) southwest of Catanzaro and about 4 kilometres (2 mi) northeast of Vibo Valentia. As of 31 December 2004, it had a population of 3,202 and an area of 18.4 square kilometres (7.1 mi^{2}). It is named after Saint Onuphrius.

Sant'Onofrio borders the following municipalities: Filogaso, Maierato, Pizzo, Stefanaconi, Vazzano, Vibo Valentia.

== Demographic evolution ==
Historical population

Year	Pop.	±%
1861	2,269	—
1871	2,459	+8.4%
1881	2,620	+6.5%
1901	3,617	+38.1%
1911	3,502	−3.2%

Year	Pop.	±%
1921	4,433	+26.6%
1931	4,356	−1.7%
1936	4,432	+1.7%
1951	5,069	+14.4%
1961	4,842	−4.5%

Year	Pop.	±%
1971	4,044	−16.5%
1981	3,620	−10.5%
1991	3,955	+9.3%
2001	3,238	−18.1%

Source: Data from ISTAT

== Surnames ==
The most common names in Sant'Onofrio.

1. Cugliari
2. De Fina
3. Barbieri
4. Lopreiato
5. Marcello
6. Arcella
7. Pezzo
8. Figliano
9. Marago'
10. Defina
11. Virdo'
12. D'Urzo
13. Santaguida
