= San Calogero =

San Calogero Άγιος Καλόγερος (Greek)
- Comune
- Comune di San Calogero
- Location within Italy Location within Calabria
- Coordinates: 38°34′N 16°1′E
- Country: Italy
- Region: Calabria
- Province: Province of Vibo Valentia (VV)
- Frazioni: Calimera

Area
  - Total: 25.1 km^{2} (9.7 sq mi)

Population (Dec. 2004)
  - Total: 4,571
  - Density: 182/km^{2} (472/sq mi)
- Demonym: Sancalogeresi
- Time zone: UTC+1 (CET)
  - Summer (DST): UTC+2 (CEST)
- Postal code: 89842
- Dialing code: 0963

San Calogero (Calabrian Greek: Άγιος Καλόγερος, romanized: Aghios Kalogeros) is a comune (municipality) in the Province of Vibo Valentia in the Italian region Calabria, located about 60 kilometres (37 mi) southwest of Catanzaro and about 13 kilometres (8 mi) southwest of Vibo Valentia. As of 31 December 2004, it had a population of 4,571 and an area of 25.1 square kilometres (9.7 mi^{2}).

San Calogero borders the following municipalities: Candidoni, Filandari, Limbadi, Mileto, Rombiolo.

== Demographic evolution ==
Historical population

Year	Pop.	±%
1861	2,348	—
1871	2,349	+0.0%
1881	2,706	+15.2%
1901	2,976	+10.0%
1911	3,376	+13.4%

Year	Pop.	±%
1921	3,255	−3.6%
1931	3,462	+6.4%
1936	3,757	+8.5%
1951	4,018	+6.9%
1961	4,115	+2.4%

Year	Pop.	±%
1971	4,480	+8.9%
1981	4,774	+6.6%
1991	4,777	+0.1%
2001	4,649	−2.7%

Source: Data from ISTAT
