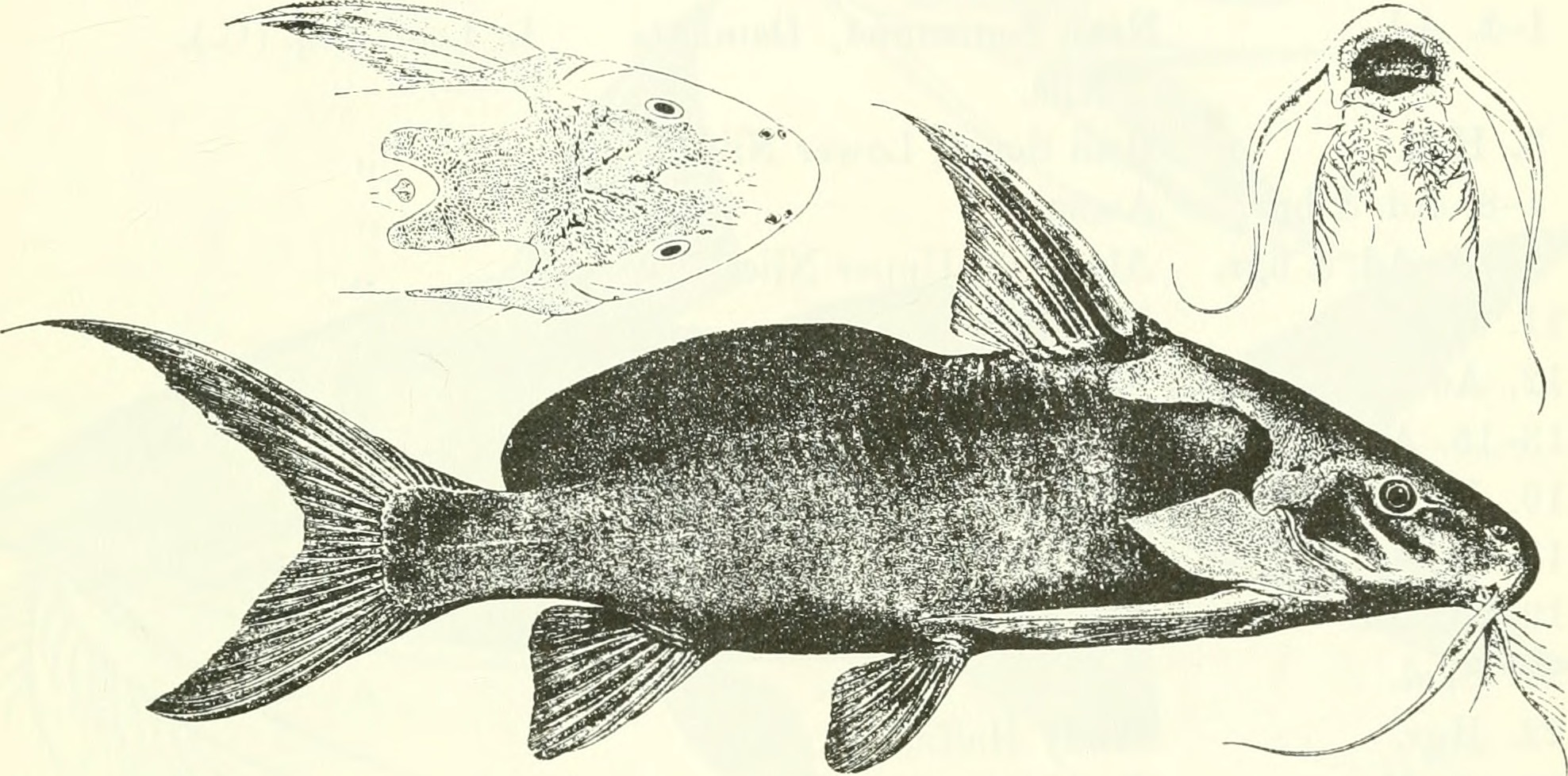

Conservation status
- Least Concern (IUCN 3.1)

Scientific classification
- Kingdom: Animalia
- Phylum: Chordata
- Class: Actinopterygii
- Order: Siluriformes
- Family: Mochokidae
- Genus: Synodontis
- Species: S. serratus

Binomial name
- Synodontis serratus Rüppell, 1829

= Synodontis serratus =

Species of fish

Synodontis serratus, known as the shield-head squeaker, is a species of upside-down catfish that is native to the Nile basin of the Democratic Republic of the Congo, Egypt, Ethiopia and Sudan. It was first described by German naturalist and explorer Eduard Rüppell in 1829, from specimens obtained near Cairo, Egypt. The species name serratus comes from the Latin word serra, meaning "saw", which refers to the serrated pectoral spines of the species.

== Description ==
Like all members of the genus Synodontis, S. serratus has a strong, bony head capsule that extends back as far as the first spine of the dorsal fin. The head contains a distinct narrow, bony, external protrusion called a humeral process. The shape and size of the humeral process helps to identify the species. In S. serratus, the humeral process is rough, much longer than it is broad, and pointed at the end.

The fish has three pairs of barbels. The maxillary barbels are on located on the upper jaw, and two pairs of mandibular barbels are on the lower jaw. The maxillary barbel is straight without any branches, with a broad membrane at the base. It extends about 2/3 to 1 1/3 times the length of the head. The outer pair of mandibular barbels is about twice as long as the inner pair, have long, slender branches with secondary branches.

The front edges of the dorsal fins and the pectoral fins of Syntontis species are hardened into stiff spines. In S. serratus, the spine is as long or a little shorter than the head, curved, smooth in the front and serrated on the back. The remaining portion of the dorsal fin is made up of seven branching rays. The spine of the pectoral fin is as long or slightly longer than the dorsal spine, and serrated on both sides. The adipose fin is 3 to 4 times as long as it is deep. The anal fin contains five unbranched and seven to eight branched rays, and is obtusely pointed in the front. The tail, or caudal fin, is deeply notched, with the upper lobe longer and sometimes ending in a filament.

All members of Syndontis have a structure called a premaxillary toothpad, which is located on the very front of the upper jaw of the mouth. This structure contains several rows of short, chisel-shaped teeth. In S. serratus, the toothpad forms a short, broad band. On the lower jaw, or mandible, the teeth of Syndontis are attached to flexible, stalk-like structures and described as "s-shaped" or "hooked". The number of teeth on the mandible is used to differentiate between species; in S. serratus, there are about 30 to 45 teeth on the mandible.

The color of the fish is a uniform grey or brownish on the back, white on the underside. Juveniles may have small dark specs on the back and adipose fin.

The maximum total length of the species is 39.5 centimetres (15.6 in). Generally, females in the genus Synodontis tend to be slightly larger than males of the same age.

== Habitat and behavior ==
In the wild, the species is known only from the Nile River basin. The species is harvested for human consumption. In its natural environment, it prefers deep water and rocky habitats. The reproductive habits of most of the species of Synodontis are not known, beyond some instances of obtaining egg counts from gravid females. Spawning likely occurs during the flooding season between July and October, and pairs swim in unison during spawning. The growth rate is rapid in the first year, then slows down as the fish age.
