= Serrata, Calabria =

Serrata
- Comune
- Comune di Serrata
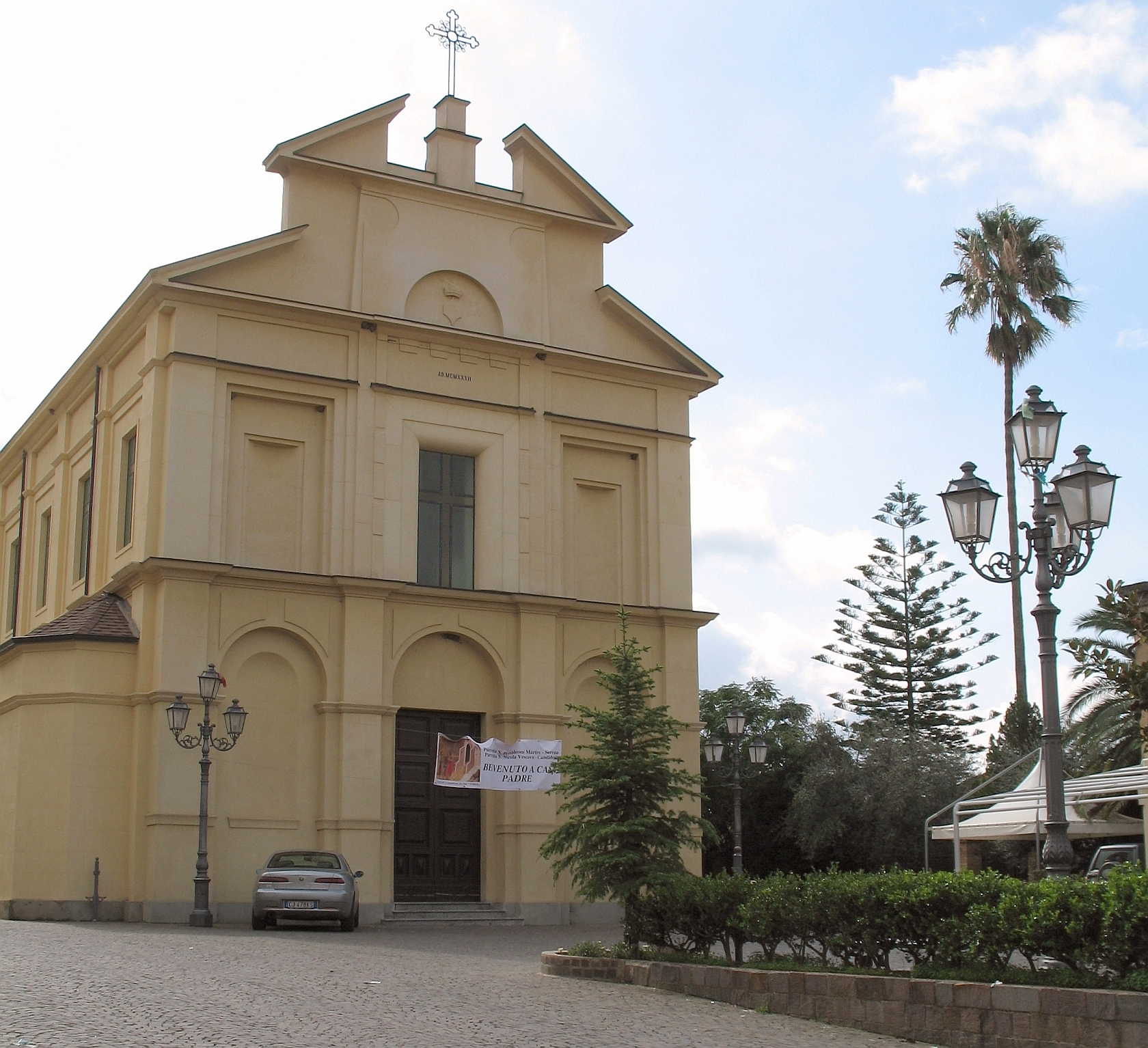
- Parrocchia di San Pantaleone

- Location within Italy Location within Calabria
- Coordinates: 38°32′N 16°5′E
- Country: Italy
- Region: Calabria
- Metropolitan city: Reggio Calabria (RC)

Government
  - Mayor: Salvatore Vinci

Area
  - Total: 21.8 km^{2} (8.4 sq mi)

Population (Dec. 2004)
  - Total: 922
  - Density: 42.3/km^{2} (110/sq mi)
- Demonym: Serratesi
- Time zone: UTC+1 (CET)
  - Summer (DST): UTC+2 (CEST)
- Postal code: 89020
- Dialing code: 0966

Serrata is a comune (municipality) in the Province of Reggio Calabria in the Italian region Calabria, located about 60 kilometres (37 mi) southwest of Catanzaro and about 60 km (37 mi) northeast of Reggio Calabria. As of 31 December 2004, it had a population of 922 and an area of 21.8 square kilometres (8.4 mi^{2}).

Serrata borders the following municipalities: Candidoni, Dinami, Laureana di Borrello, Mileto, San Pietro di Caridà.

== Demographic evolution ==
Historical population

Year	Pop.	±%
1861	1,012	—
1871	923	−8.8%
1881	923	+0.0%
1901	1,199	+29.9%
1911	1,279	+6.7%

Year	Pop.	±%
1921	1,424	+11.3%
1931	1,671	+17.3%
1936	1,690	+1.1%
1951	1,759	+4.1%
1961	1,702	−3.2%

Year	Pop.	±%
1971	1,369	−19.6%
1981	1,087	−20.6%
1991	1,183	+8.8%
2001	964	−18.5%

Source: Data from ISTAT
