= Stefanaconi =

Stefanaconi Greek: Stephanikónion
- Comune
- Comune di Stefanaconi
- Location within Italy Location within Calabria
- Coordinates: 38°40′N 16°7′E
- Country: Italy
- Region: Calabria
- Province: Province of Vibo Valentia (VV)
- Frazioni: Morsillara

Area
  - Total: 23.2 km^{2} (9.0 sq mi)
- Elevation: 347 m (1,138 ft)

Population (December 2004)
  - Total: 2,477
  - Density: 107/km^{2} (277/sq mi)
- Demonym: Stefanaconesi
- Time zone: UTC+1 (CET)
  - Summer (DST): UTC+2 (CEST)
- Postal code: 89843
- Dialing code: 0963
- Website: Official website

Stefanaconi ([stefa'nakoni]) (Ancient Greek: Στεφανικόνιον, romanized: Stephanikónion) is a comune (municipality) in the Province of Vibo Valentia in the Italian region Calabria, located about 50 kilometres (31 mi) southwest of Catanzaro and about 3 kilometres (2 mi) east of Vibo Valentia. As of 31 December 2004, it had a population of 2,477 and an area of 23.2 square kilometres (9.0 mi^{2}).

The municipality of Stefanaconi contains the frazione (subdivision) Morsillara.

Stefanaconi borders the following municipalities: Francica, Gerocarne, Pizzoni, Sant'Onofrio, Soriano Calabro, Vazzano, Vibo Valentia.

== Demographic evolution ==
Historical population

Year	Pop.	±%
1861	1,678	—
1871	1,745	+4.0%
1881	1,798	+3.0%
1901	1,903	+5.8%
1911	2,124	+11.6%

Year	Pop.	±%
1921	2,148	+1.1%
1931	2,627	+22.3%
1936	2,679	+2.0%
1951	3,115	+16.3%
1961	2,646	−15.1%

Year	Pop.	±%
1971	1,967	−25.7%
1981	2,153	+9.5%
1991	2,395	+11.2%
2001	2,497	+4.3%

Source: Data from ISTAT

== Surnames ==
11 most common names in Stefanaconi.

1. Franzè
2. Lopreiato
3. Matina
4. Fortuna
5. Solano
6. Arcella
7. Cugliari
8. De Fina
9. Maluccio
10. Meddis
11. Piperno
