= Cardinale, Calabria =

Cardinale
- Comune
- Comune di Cardinale
- Location within Italy Location within Calabria
- Coordinates: 38°39′N 16°23′E
- Country: Italy
- Region: Calabria
- Province: Catanzaro (CZ)
- Frazioni: Novalba, Razzona, Galiano, Coccumella

Government
  - Mayor: Danilo Staglianò

Area
  - Total: 31 km^{2} (12 sq mi)
- Elevation: 560 m (1,840 ft)

Population (31 December 2017)
  - Total: 2,068
  - Density: 67/km^{2} (170/sq mi)
- Demonym: Cardinalesi
- Time zone: UTC+1 (CET)
  - Summer (DST): UTC+2 (CEST)
- Postal code: 88062
- Dialing code: 0967
- Patron saint: St. Nicholas of Bari
- Saint day: 6 December and Last Sunday in May
- Website: Official website

Cardinale (Calabrian: Cardinaru) is a comune and town in the province of Catanzaro in the Calabria region of southern Italy.
