= Corrado L'Andolina =

Italian politician (born 1969)

President of the Province of Vibo Valentia
- In office 29 January 2023 – 29 September 2026
- Preceded by: Salvatore Solano

Mayor of Zambrone
- In office 6 June 2016 – 28 September 2026
- Preceded by: Giovanna Pileggi

Personal details
- Born: Corrado Antonio L'Andolina; 28 April 1969 (age 57) Zambrone, Province of Catanzaro, Italy
- Education: University of Bologna
- Occupation: Public administrator, lawyer, journalist

Corrado Antonio L'Andolina (born 28 April 1969) is an Italian politician who served as president of the Province of Vibo Valentia from 2023 to 2026. He also served as mayor of Zambrone from 2016 to 2026.

== Life and career ==
L'Andolina was born in Zambrone, Calabria, in 1969. He attended secondary school in Vibo Valentia before graduating in law from the University of Bologna. He subsequently practised as a lawyer for nearly 25 years before moving into public administration. In 2015, he was appointed expert collaborator at the Regional Council of Calabria.

He has been involved in cultural and journalistic activities, founding and directing the local periodical Cronache Aramonesi in December 2005. Between 2006 and 2014, he contributed to the newspapers Calabria Ora and L'Ora della Calabria, and later collaborated with Il Quotidiano del Sud (2014–2016). He has been registered as a professional journalist with the Journalists' Association of Calabria since 2010.

In 2016, L'Andolina bacame mayor of Zambrone and was re-confirmed in 2021. In January 2023, he was elected president of the Province of Vibo Valentia as the centre-right candidate, supported by Forza Italia, Brothers of Italy, Lega, Union of the Centre, Italy in the Centre, and Us Moderates. He defeated Giuseppe Condello, the candidate of the centre-left coalition, receiving 57.65% of the weighted votes.

His terms ended prematurely in September 2026, when six municipal councillors, three from the governing majority and three from the opposition, simultaneously resigned, bringing down the municipal administration. He subsequently left the office of provincial president on 29 September.
