= Limardo =

Limardo is a surname. Notable people with the surname include:

- Francisco Limardo (born 1987), Venezuelan fencer
- Jesús Limardo (born 1996), Venezuelan fencer
- Maria Limardo (born 1960), Italian politician
- Rubén Limardo (born 1985), Venezuelan fencer
