= Nicola D'Agostino =

Italian politician

Mayor of Vibo Valentia
- In office 13 April 2010 – 3 June 2015
- Preceded by: Francesco Sammarco
- Succeeded by: Elio Costa

Personal details
- Born: 24 April 1958 (age 68) Vibo Valentia, Calabria, Italy
- Party: The People of Freedom (2009-2013); Forza Italia (since 2013)
- Education: University of Florence
- Profession: lawyer

Nicola D'Agostino (born 24 April 1958 in Vibo Valentia) is an Italian politician.

He was a member of the centre-right party The People of Freedom and was elected Mayor of Vibo Valentia at the 2010 Italian local elections. He took office on 13 April 2010 and served until 3 June 2015.

== Biography ==
He is the son of Professor Alfredo D'Agostino, former mayor of List of mayors of Vibo Valentia.

He earned his classical high school diploma in 1976 with a score of 60/60 and graduated with a law degree from the University of Florence in 1980 with a grade of 104/110. He has been a member of the Vibo Valentia Bar Association since October 24, 1985. He has been a Supreme Court-admitted attorney since 1998.

== See also ==
- 2010 Italian local elections
- List of mayors of Vibo Valentia

Political offices
Preceded by Francesco Sammarco	Mayor of Vibo Valentia; 2010–2015	Succeeded by Elio Costa
