= Elio Costa =

Italian politician and magistrate

Mayor of Vibo Valentia
- In office 3 June 2015 – 31 January 2019
- Preceded by: Nicola D'Agostino
- Succeeded by: Maria Limardo
- In office 28 May 2002 – 15 January 2005
- Preceded by: Alfredo D'Agostino
- Succeeded by: Francesco Sammarco

Personal details
- Born: 21 August 1940 (age 86) Maierato, Calabria, Italy
- Party: Centre-right independent
- Education: University of Messina
- Profession: magistrate, jurist

Elio Costa (born 21 August 1940 in Maierato) is an Italian politician and magistrate.

Costa ran as an independent for the office of Mayor of Vibo Valentia at the 2002 Italian local elections, supported by a centre-right coalition. He won the election and served as Mayor of Vibo Valentia until his resignation on 15 January 2005.

He was re-elected on 3 June 2015, but he resigned for the second time on 31 January 2019, after a new internal government crisis.

== See also ==
- 2015 Italian local elections
- List of mayors of Vibo Valentia

Political offices
Preceded by Alfredo D'Agostino	Mayor of Vibo Valentia; 2002–2005	Succeeded by Francesco Sammarco
Preceded by Nicola D'Agostino	Mayor of Vibo Valentia; 2015–2019	Succeeded by Maria Limardo
