= List of mayors of Vibo Valentia =

Mayor of Vibo Valentia
- Sindaco di Vibo Valentia
- Incumbent; Enzo Romeo since 27 June 2024
- Appointer: Popular election
- Term length: 5 years, renewable once
- Formation: 1860
- Website: Official website

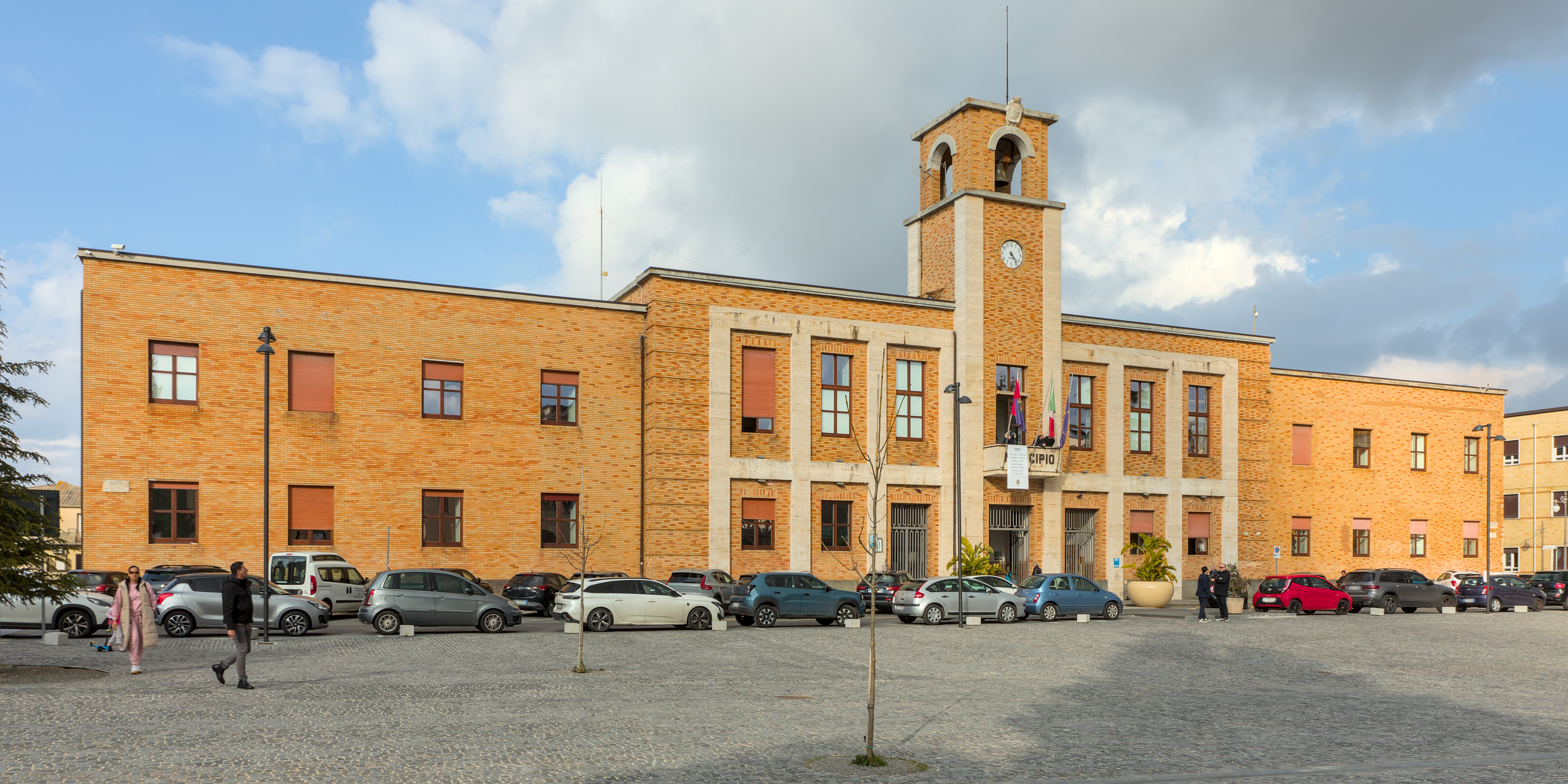
Vibo Valentia's Town Hall.

The mayor of Vibo Valentia is an elected politician who, along with the Vibo Valentia City Council, is accountable for the strategic government of Vibo Valentia in Calabria, Italy.

The current mayor is Enzo Romeo, a centre-left independent, who took office on 27 June 2024.

== Overview ==
According to the Italian Constitution, the mayor of Vibo Valentia is member of the city council.

The mayor is elected by the population of Vibo Valentia, who also elects the members of the city council, controlling the mayor's policy guidelines and is able to enforce his resignation by a motion of no confidence. The mayor is entitled to appoint and release the members of his government.

Since 1995 the mayor is elected directly by Vibo Valentia's electorate: in all mayoral elections in Italy in cities with a population higher than 15,000 the voters express a direct choice for the mayor or an indirect choice voting for the party of the candidate's coalition. If no candidate receives at least 50% of votes, the top two candidates go to a second round after two weeks. The election of the City Council is based on a direct choice for the candidate with a preference vote: the candidate with the majority of the preferences is elected. The number of the seats for each party is determined proportionally.

== Italian Republic (since 1946) ==
=== City Council election (1946-1994) ===
From 1946 to 1994, the Mayor of Vibo Valentia was elected by the City Council.

	Mayor	Term start	Term end	Party
1	Enrico Buccarelli	1946	1947	PLI
2	Lorenzo Scrugli	1947	1948	DC
3	Giacinto Inzillo	1948	1951	DC
4	Vincenzo Marturano	1951	1952	DC
5	Antonino Murmura	1952	1957	DC
6	Libero Buccarelli	1957	1965	MSI
(5)	Antonino Murmura	1965	1967	DC
7	Giuseppe De Raffaele	1967	1971	DC
(5)	Antonino Murmura	1971	1972	DC
8	Giuseppe D'Amico	1972	1979	DC
(5)	Antonino Murmura	1979	1979	DC
9	Giuseppe Manfrida	1979	1982	DC
10	Francesco Cosentino	1982	1984	DC
11	Lorenzo De Sossi	1984	1985	DC
12	Francesco Comito	1985	1986	DC
(10)	Francesco Cosentino	1986	1988	DC
13	Ulderico Petrolo	1988	1989	DC
14	Michele Montagnese	1989	1990	DC
15	Nazzareno Fiorillo	1990	1990	DC
16	Giuseppe De Giovanni	1990	1991	PSI
17	Francesco Leonardo Brasca	1991	1992	DC
18	Mario Iozzo	1992	1993	DC
19	Bruno Panuccio	1993	1994	DC

=== Direct election (since 1994) ===
Since 1994, under provisions of new local administration law, the mayor of Vibo Valentia is chosen by direct election, originally every four, then every five years.

	Mayor	Term start	Term end	Party	Coalition	Election
20	Giuseppe Iannello	28 June 1994	9 May 1997 (Note: Reisgned.)	PDS	PDS • PRC	1994
Special Prefectural Commissioner tenure (9 May 1997 – 1 December 1997)
21	Alfredo D'Agostino	1 December 1997	28 May 2002	FI	FI • AN • CCD	1997
22	Elio Costa	28 May 2002	15 January 2005 (Note: Ousted from office after the majority of the members of the City Council resigned.)	Ind	FI • AN • UDC	2002
Special Prefectural Commissioner tenure (15 January 2005 – 5 April 2005)
23	Francesco Sammarco	5 April 2005	13 April 2010	DS; PD	DS • DL • UDEUR	2005
23	Nicola D'Agostino	13 April 2010	3 June 2015	PdL	PdL	2010
(22)	Elio Costa	3 June 2015	31 January 2019 (Note: Ousted from office after the majority of the members of the City Council resigned.)	Ind	Ind	2015
Special Prefectural Commissioner tenure (31 January 2019 – 3 June 2019)
24	Maria Limardo	3 June 2019	27 June 2024	Ind	FI • FdI • UDC	2019
25	Enzo Romeo	27 June 2024	Incumbent	Ind	PD • M5S • AVS	2024
