= Andrea Niglia =

Italian politician (born 1976)

President of the Province of Vibo Valentia
- In office 28 September 2014 – 8 May 2018
- Preceded by: Francesco De Nisi
- Succeeded by: Salvatore Solano

Mayor of Briatico
- In office 26 June 2014 – 11 May 2018
- Preceded by: Francesco Prestia
- Succeeded by: Lidio Vallone
- In office 5 April 2005 – 30 March 2010
- Preceded by: Costantino Massara
- Succeeded by: Francesco Prestia

Personal details
- Born: 22 July 1976 (age 50) Tropea, Calabria, Italy
- Education: University of Messina
- Occupation: Economist

Andrea Niglia (born 22 July 1976) is an Italian economist and politician who served as president of the Province of Vibo Valentia from 2014 to 2018. He was also mayor of Briatico from 2005 to 2018.

== Life and career ==
Born in Tropea in 1977, Niglia attended the technical commercial institute in Vibo Valentia, graduating in 1994, and obtained a degree in Economics from the University of Messina in 2000. He subsequently earned a PhD in Mathematical Tools for Economics and Finance in 2003, and was appointed a subject-matter expert at the same university in the degree programme in Law and Economics. He later taught at the Faculty of Economics and Commerce in the degree programme in Banking and Insurance Economics.

In 2005, he ran as an independent candidate on a centre-left list in the municipal elections in Calabria and was elected mayor of Briatico. He was re-elected mayor in June 2014.

In September 2014, Niglia was elected president of the Province of Vibo Valentia, heading a broad coalition which brought together Matteo Renzi-aligned members of the Democratic Party, New Centre-Right, Forza Italia and Brothers of Italy, receiving 456 weighted votes (51.8%).

In 2016, Niglia was investigated in the Costa Pulita anti-mafia operation concerning alleged political and electoral links with the Accorinti clan in Briatico. He was accused of electoral corruption in connection with the 2010 municipal elections and, in July 2018, was sentenced to two years' imprisonment for electoral corruption aggravated by 'Ndrangheta-related circumstances. The conviction was overturned in part on appeal in 2023, when the mafia aggravating circumstance was excluded and the offence was declared time-barred. In February 2025, the Court of Cassation confirmed the prescription.

In September 2023, Niglia was placed under house arrest in the Maestrale-Carthago anti-mafia investigation, which concerned alleged 'Ndrangheta influence over public administration in the Vibo Valentia area. In March 2025, he was sentenced in the abbreviated proceedings to three years and six months' imprisonment for fraud aggravated by mafia-related purposes. According to the court, he had benefited from a manipulated public recruitment procedure for a position in the municipality of Zungri, with examination questions allegedly provided to him in advance.
