= Salvatore Solano =

Italian politician (born 1979)

President of the Province of Vibo Valentia
- In office 31 October 2018 – 29 January 2023
- Preceded by: Andrea Niglia
- Succeeded by: Corrado L'Andolina

Mayor of Stefanaconi
- In office 12 June 2017 – 29 July 2024
- Preceded by: Salvatore Di Sì

Personal details
- Born: 8 January 1979 (age 47) Vibo Valentia, Calabria, Italy

Salvatore Solano (born 8 January 1979) is an Italian politician who served as president of the Province of Vibo Valentia from 2018 to 2023. He was also mayor of Stefanaconi from 2017 to 2024.

In October 2018, Solano was elected president of the Province of Vibo Valentia as the candidate of a centre-right coalition supported by Forza Italia, Lega and Brothers of Italy, defeating Antonino Schinella, the Democratic Party candidate, with 50,948 weighted votes (57.31%).

In 2020, Solano became involved in the Dedalo-Petrolmafie investigation into corruption and links between public officials and entrepreneurs in Calabria. He was subsequently prosecuted over alleged corruption involving public contracts, with prosecutors seeking an eight-year prison sentence. In 2026, the Court of Appeal of Catanzaro acquitted him, finding no evidence of a corrupt agreement or of interference with the Province of Vibo Valentia.
