= List of presidents of the Province of Vibo Valentia =

President of the Province of Vibo Valentia
- Presidente della Provincia di Vibo Valentia
- Incumbent; Franco Barbalace (acting) since 29 September 2026
- Term length: 4 years
- Inaugural holder: Enzo Romeo
- Formation: 1995

The president of the Province of Vibo Valentia is the head of the provincial government in Vibo Valentia, Calabria, Italy. The president oversees the administration of the province, coordinates the activities of the municipalities, and represents the province in regional and national matters.

Since September 2026, the office has been held by vice president Franco Barbalace after the resignation of president Corrado L'Andolina. New elections are scheduled to take place on 27 December 2026.

== History ==
The Province of Vibo Valentia was established in 1992, after being separated from the Province of Catanzaro. In its initial phase, the new province was administered by a government-appointed extraordinary commissioner, Alfonso Guido, pending the organisation of its institutional bodies. Following the 1995 elections, Enzo Romeo took office as the first president of the province, marking the beginning of the province's ordinary democratic administration. In accordance with the reform of local authorities introduced in 1993, the president was directly elected by the citizens for a five-year term and was responsible for appointing and dismissing the members of the Provincial Executive.

Following the 2014 Delrio Law, the president is elected by an assembly composed of the mayors and municipal councillors of the municipalities within the province. The president serves a four-year term and acts as the legal representative of the province, presiding over the Provincial Council and the Provincial Assembly of Mayors.

== List ==
Nº	Portrait	Name	Term		Party
1		Enzo Romeo	8 May 1995	14 June 1999	The Olive Tree
2		Ottavio Bruni	14 June 1999	14 June 2004	Italian People's Party; The Daisy
2		Ottavio Bruni	14 June 2004	26 February 2008	Italian People's Party; The Daisy
3		Francesco De Nisi	14 April 2008	20 November 2012	Democratic Party
–		Mario Ciclosi	20 November 2012	28 September 2014	Prefectural commissioner
4		Andrea Niglia	28 September 2014	8 May 2018	Independent (centre-left)
–		Alfredo Lo Bianco (acting)	8 May 2018	31 October 2018	Independent (centre-left)
5		Salvatore Solano	31 October 2018	29 January 2023	Independent (centre-right)
6		Corrado L'Andolina	29 January 2023	29 September 2026	Independent (centre-right)
–		Franco Barbalace (acting)	29 September 2026	Incumbent	Independent (centre-left)

== Sources ==
- "Storia amministrativa dell'ente". Ministero dell'Interno.
