= Maria Limardo =

Italian politician (born 1960)

Mayor of Vibo Valentia
- In office 3 June 2019 – 27 June 2024
- Preceded by: Elio Costa
- Succeeded by: Enzo Romeo

Personal details
- Born: 16 October 1960 (age 65) Cessaniti, Calabria, Italy
- Party: National Alliance (until 2009); The People of Freedom (2009–2013); Independent (since 2013)
- Education: University of Rome La Sapienza
- Profession: lawyer

Maria Limardo (born 16 October 1960 in Cessaniti) is an Italian politician.

Formerly member of right-wing party National Alliance, she joined The People of Freedom in 2009. She served as assessor in the Elio Costa government in Vibo Valentia from 2002 to 2005.

Limardo ran for Mayor of Vibo Valentia at the 2019 local elections as an independent, supported by a centre-right coalition composed of Forza Italia, Brothers of Italy and local civic lists. She won and took office on 3 June 2019.

She is the first woman to be elected Mayor of Vibo Valentia.

== Biography ==
She earned a law degree from Sapienza University of Rome in 1984, practices law, and specializes in the anthropology of communication.

After a career in politics with the National Alliance (Italy), where she served as provincial chair and held national offices, she was elected several times to the Vibo Valentia City Council and also served as councilor for commerce in 2004; in 2010, she ran for the regional legislature as a candidate for The People of Freedom party but was not elected.

In 2019, she ran for mayor of List of mayors of Vibo Valentia as part of a center-right coalition comprising Forza Italia (2013), Fratelli d'Italia, and several civic lists. She won the local elections in the first round with 59.54% of the vote, becoming the first woman to hold the office of mayor. She took office on June 3, 2019.

In 2024, he will not run for a second term.

== See also ==
- 2019 Italian local elections
- List of mayors of Vibo Valentia
