= Enzo Romeo =

Italian politician

Mayor of Vibo Valentia
- Incumbent
- Assumed office 27 June 2024
- Preceded by: Maria Limardo

President of the Province of Vibo Valentia
- In office 8 May 1995 – 14 June 1999
- Preceded by: Office created
- Succeeded by: Ottavio Bruni

Personal details
- Born: 10 July 1955 (age 71) Vibo Valentia, Province of Catanzaro, Italy
- Education: Sapienza University of Rome

Vincenzo Francesco Romeo (born 10 July 1955), known as Enzo Romeo, is an Italian politician who has served as mayor of Vibo Valentia since June 2024. He previously served as the first president of the Province of Vibo Valentia from 1995 to 1999.

== Life and career ==
Graduating in medicine and surgery from the Sapienza University of Rome, Romeo specialized in dentistry and practised in his hometown.

Active in politics, he became the official candidate of the Olive Tree coalition for president of the Province of Vibo Valentia in 1995 and was elected in a run-off with 53% of the vote.

In the 2024 municipal elections, Romeo ran for mayor of Vibo Valentia as the centre-left candidate, backed by the Democratic Party, the Five Star Movement, and the Greens and Left Alliance. He defeated the centre-right candidate, Roberto Cosentino, in a run-off with 53.60% of the vote. As mayor, Romeo took office on 27 June and, in November, implemented a 30% reduction in municipal officials' salaries. This measure aims to save €200,000 for public services and social initiatives.

In October 2024, he was elected president of the Vibo Valentia Library System (Sistema Bibliotecario Vibonese), committed to addressing its critical financial and legal issues by proposing a recovery plan and establishing a technical working group with the Calabria Region.

Political offices
| Preceded by Office created | President of the Province of Vibo Valentia; 1995–1999 | Succeeded by Ottavio Bruni |
| Preceded by Maria Limardo | Mayor of Vibo Valentia; 2024– | Succeeded by |
