= Santa Ruba, San Gregorio d'Ippona =

Church in San Gregorio d'Ippona, Italy

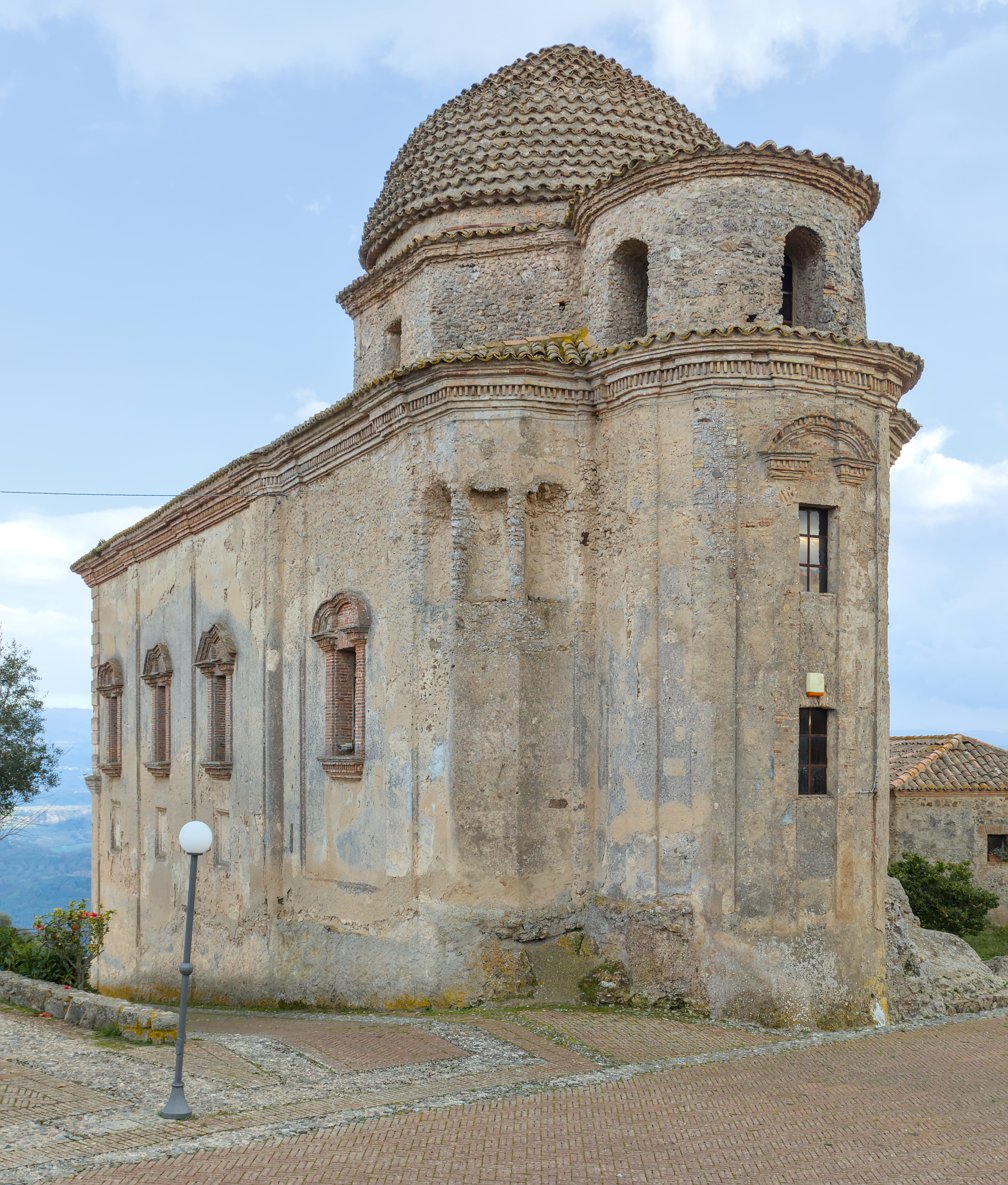
The church.

Santa Ruba is a church located outside of the town of San Gregorio d'Ippona, province of Calabria, Italy. It rises along SS 182 on the road towards Vibo Valentia. It is presently a Roman Catholic Marian sanctuary dedicated to "Maria Santissima della Salute".

== Description ==
The history of this church remains somewhat nebulous due to lack of documentation. It originally was attached to a Basilian monastery, which appears to have persisted until the 1908, when the monastery was abandoned due to damage from the 1905 Calabria earthquake. It is unclear when the church was built; some have suggested that its layout and dome indicate construction was completed during Byzantine rule of the region, perhaps as early as the 10th century. The present interior is due to refurbishments along the centuries, including a baroque refurbishment in the 18th century. Others claim the present layout dates to a reconstruction in 1610. The significance of the name Santa Ruba is also unclear. Some speculate it may derive from the church's location near a cliff (rupe). The church fell into ruin in the early 20th century, but decades later underwent restoration with reconsecration in 1977. Some of the original statuary had been rescued by local parishioners.

The church has a semicircular apse connected to a dome with an octagonal drum. The nave is long, single and tall. The present interior appears to reflect the baroque refurbishments.

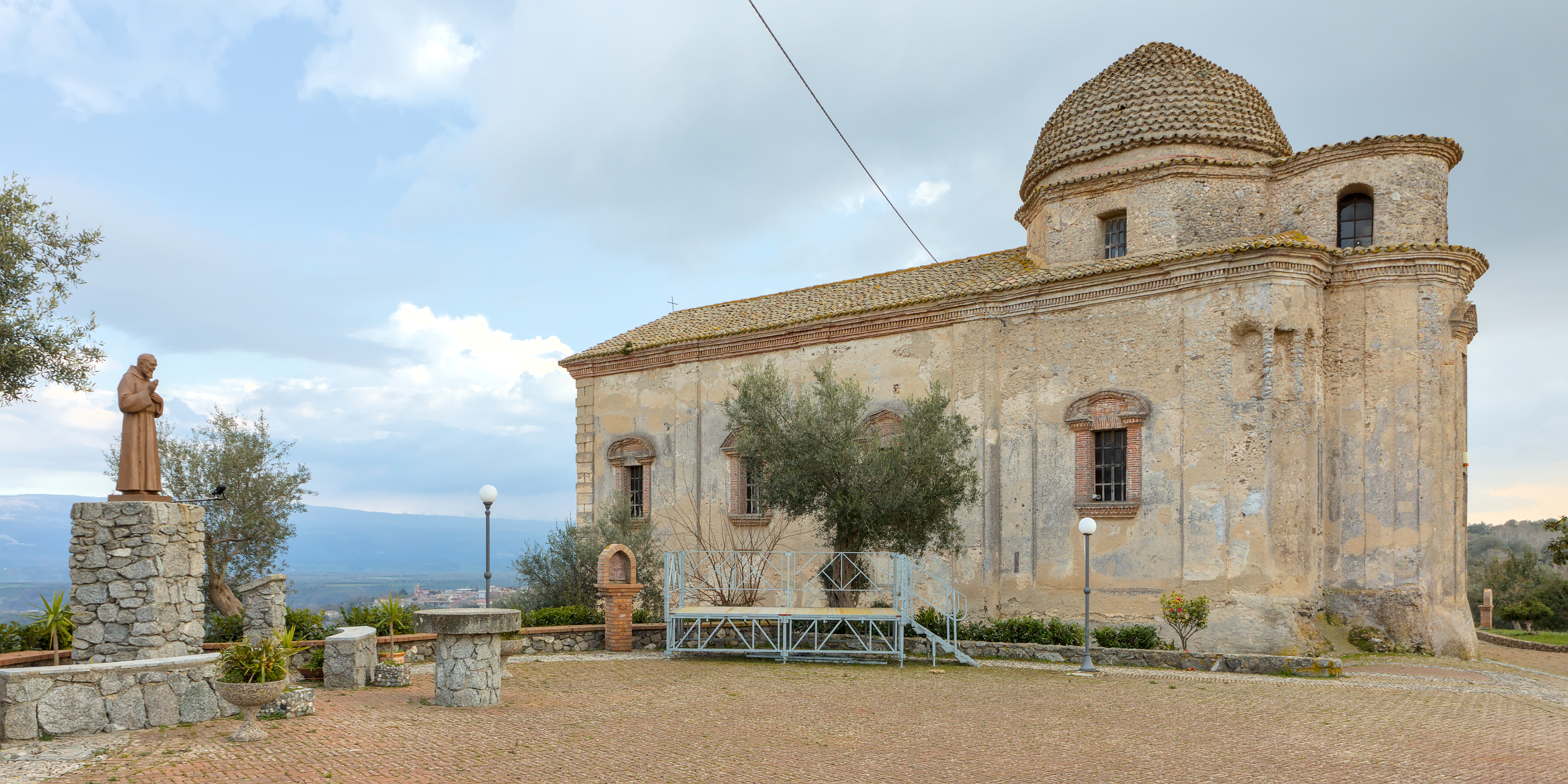
The sanctuary.

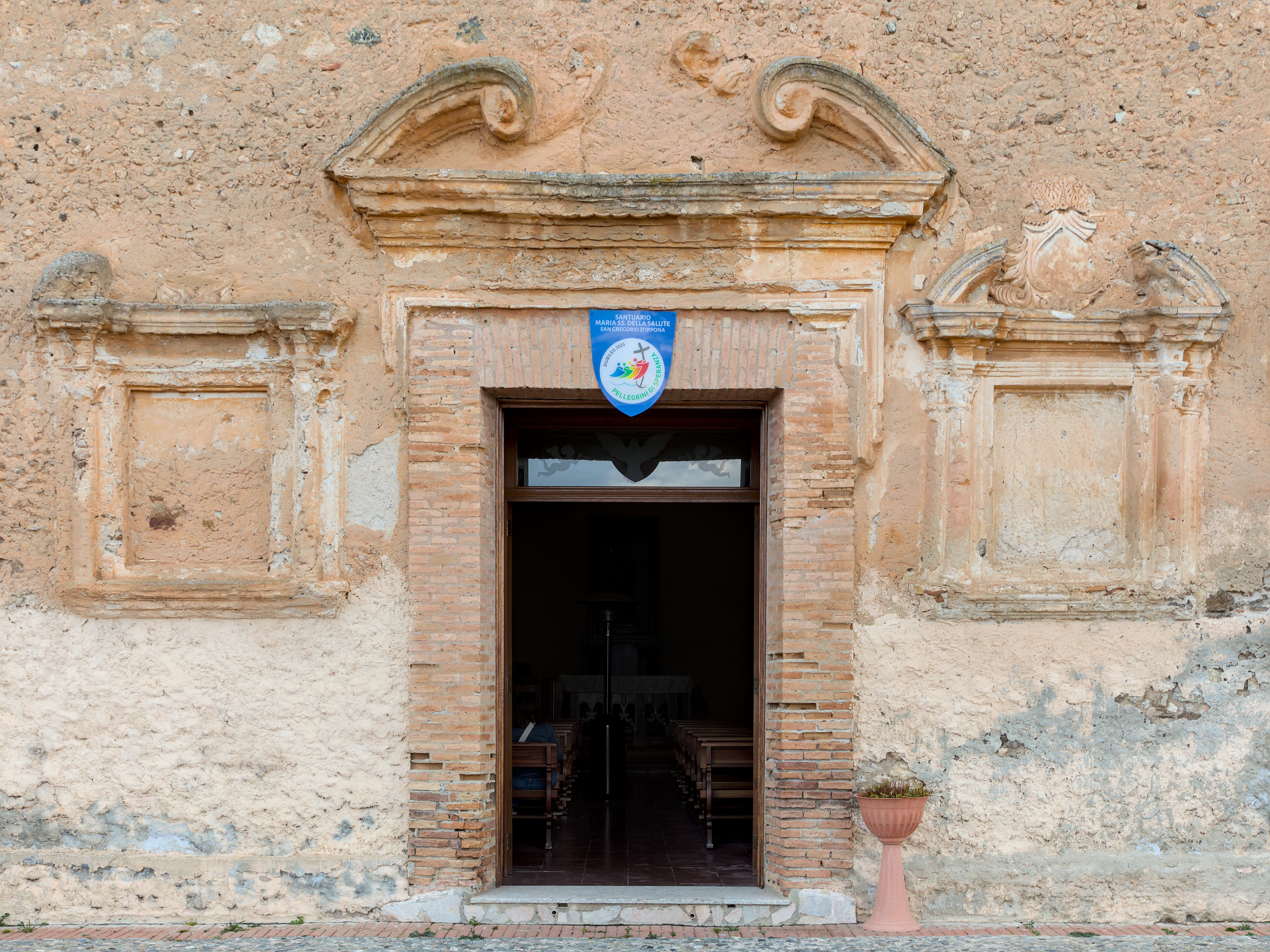
The portal of the church

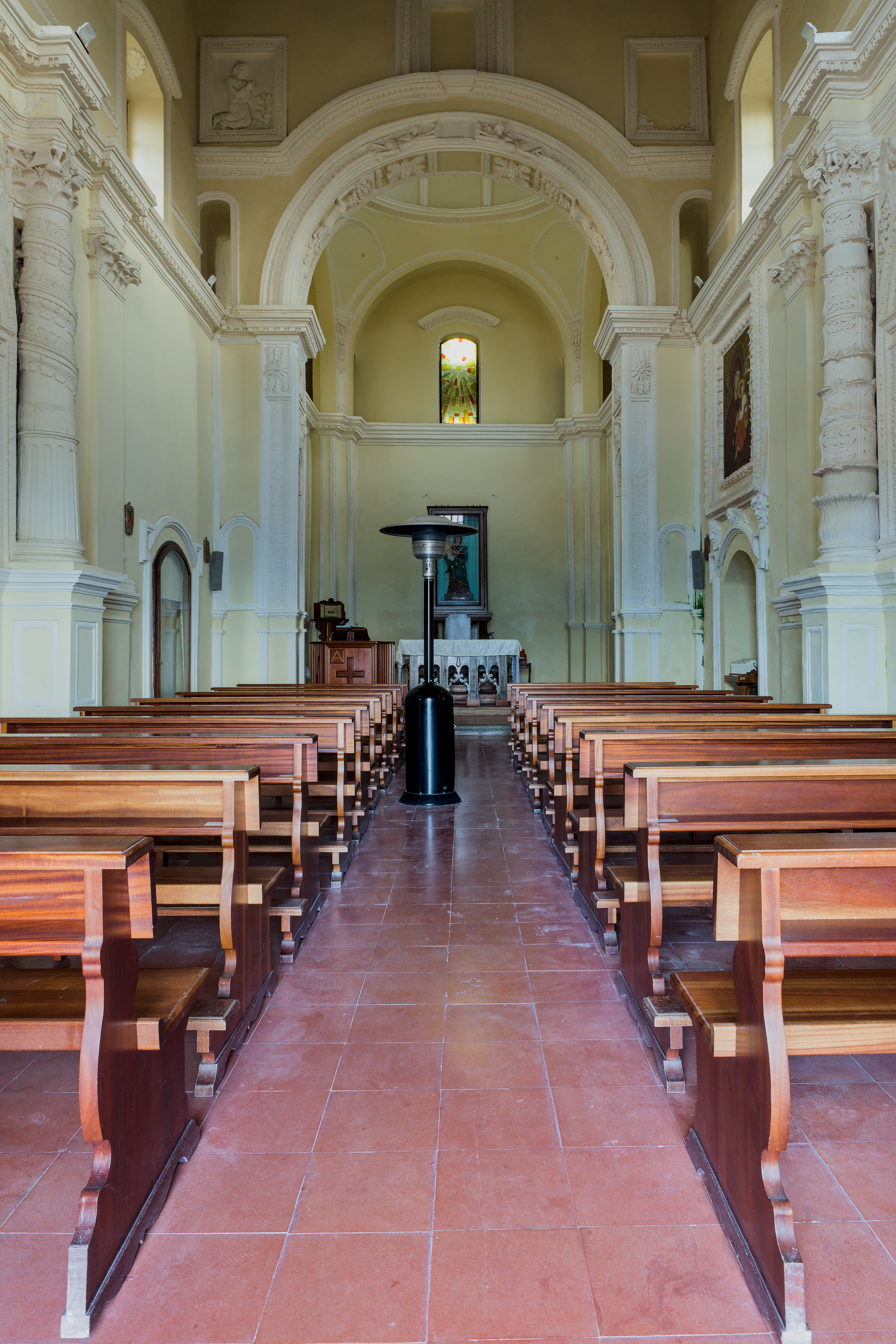
The interior.

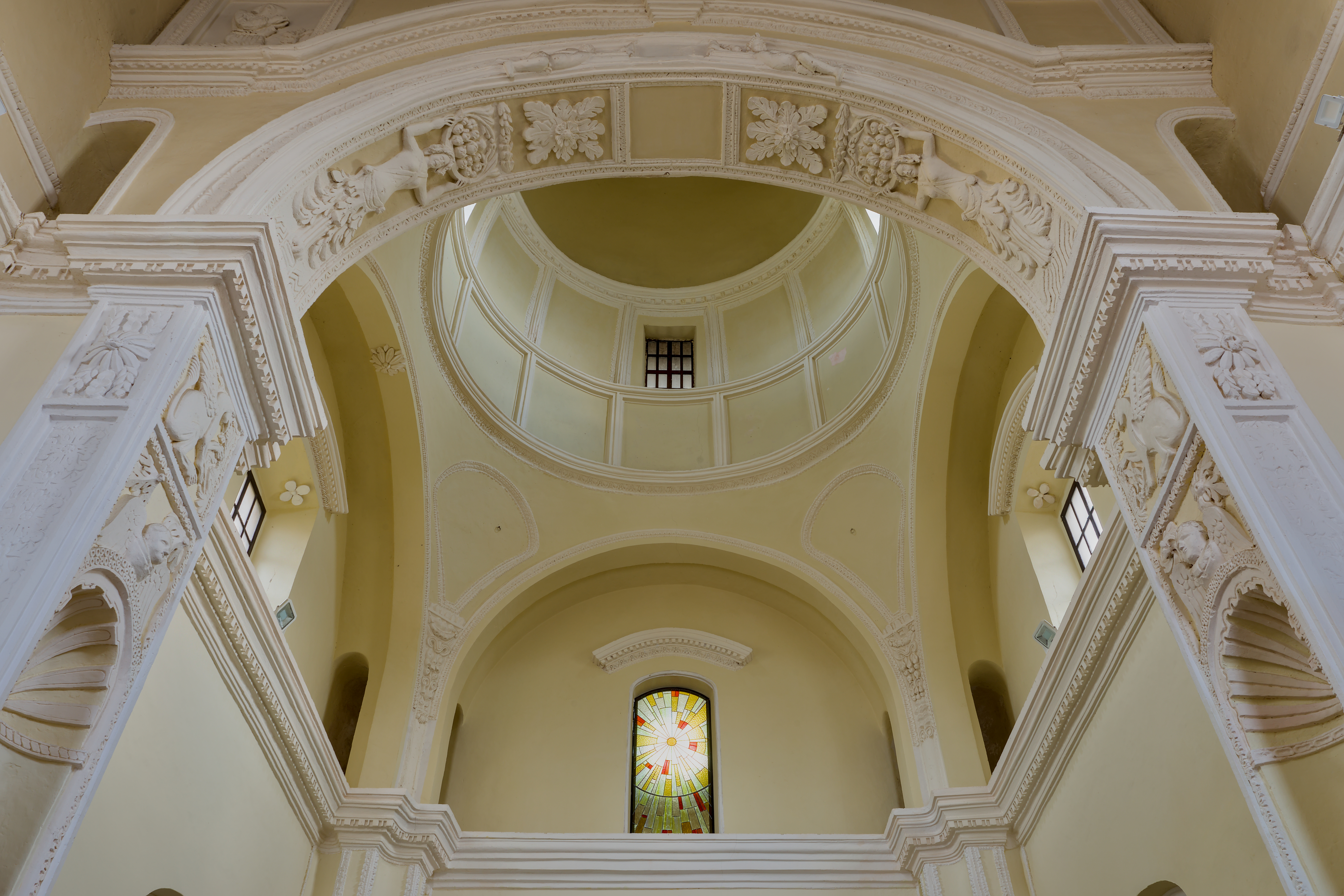
Interior of the dome.

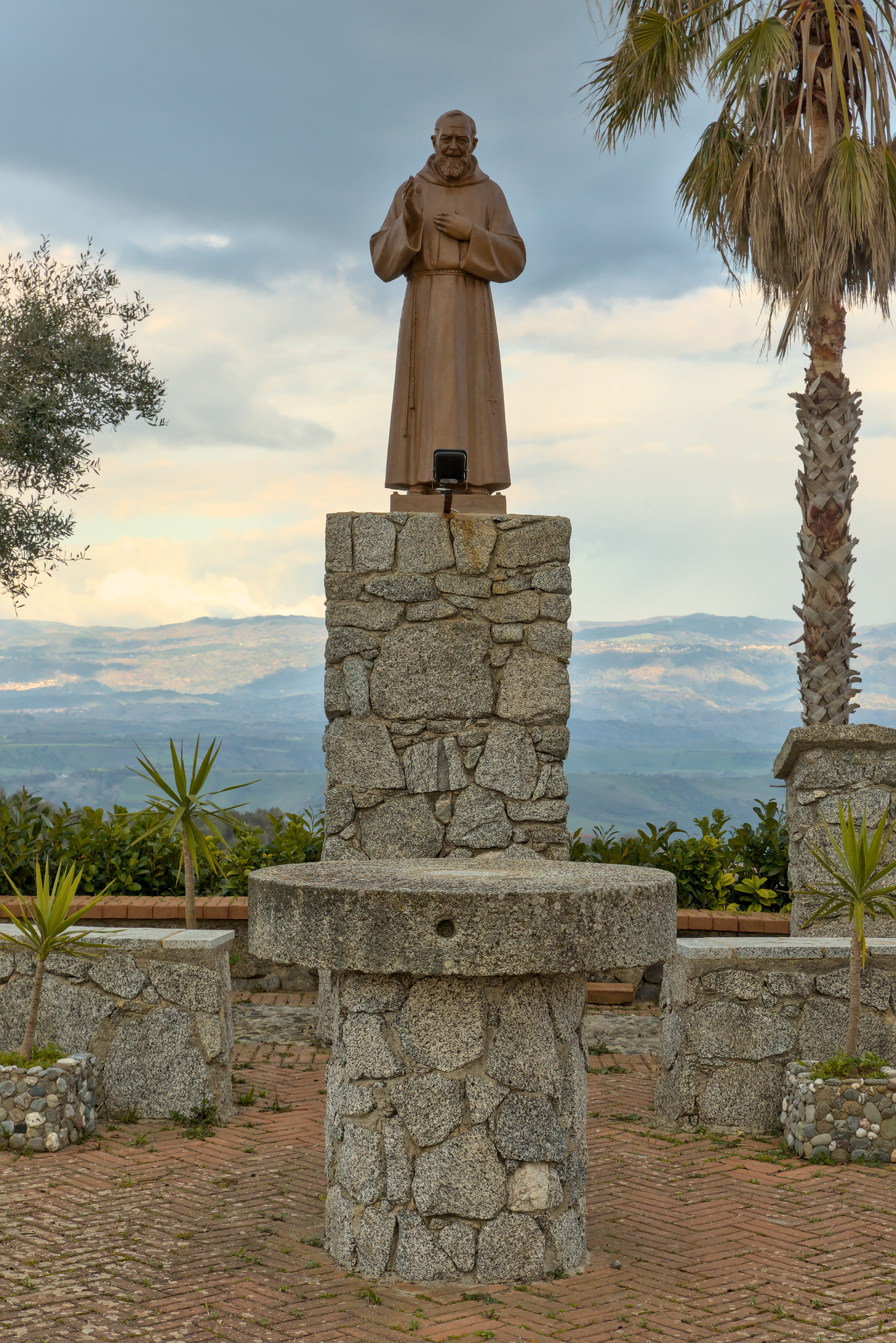
Statue outside.

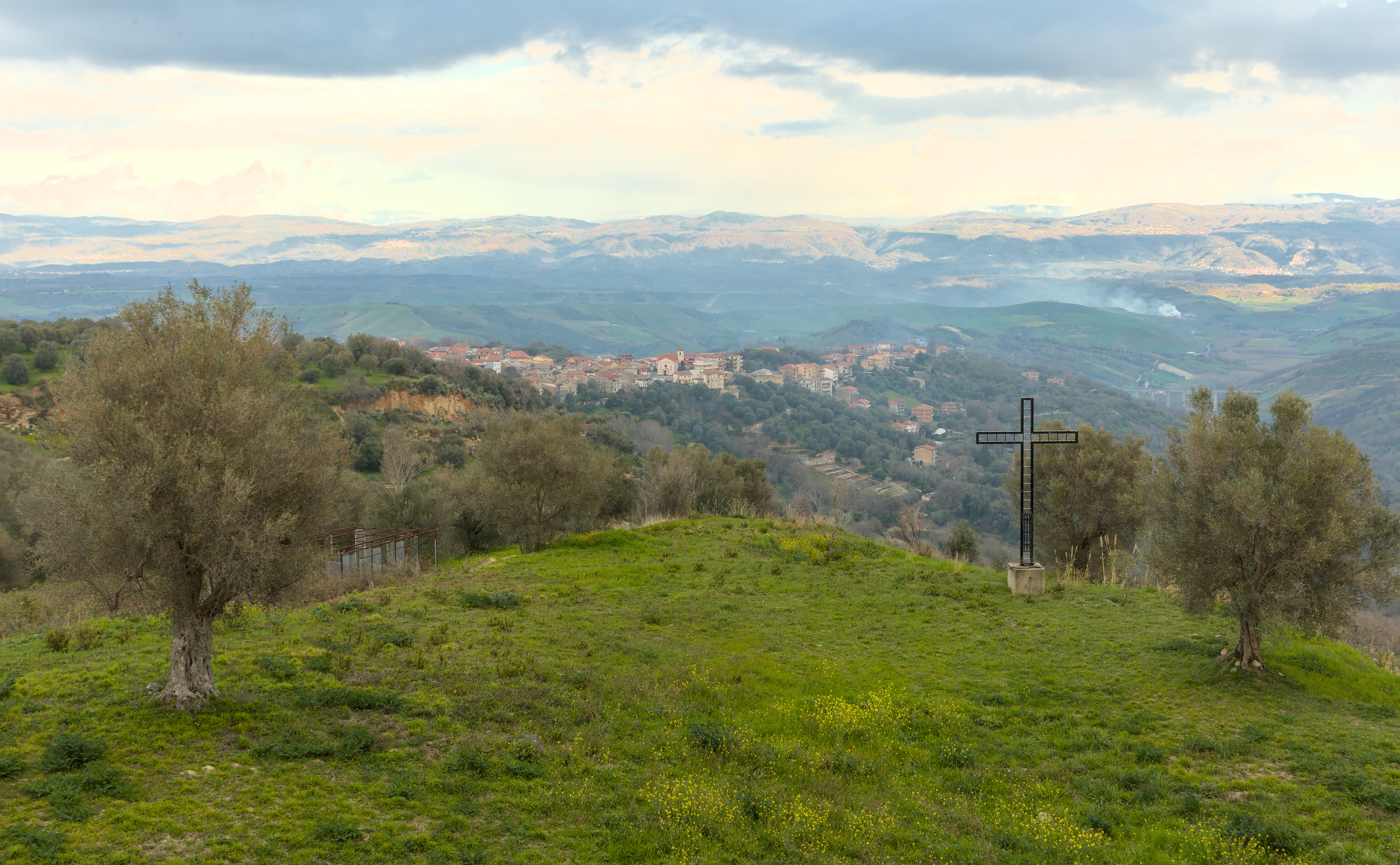
The view over mountains from the church entrance.
