= Ottavio Bruni =

Italian politician

Mayor of Acquaro
- In office 1975–1985

Member of the Provincial Council of Catanzaro
- In office 27 July 1985 – 8 May 1995

President of the Province of Vibo Valentia
- In office 14 June 1999 – 26 February 2008
- Preceded by: Enzo Romeo
- Succeeded by: Francesco De Nisi

Member of the Regional Council of Calabria
- In office 12 April 2010 – 9 December 2014

Personal details
- Born: 15 April 1944 (age 82) Acquaro, Province of Catanzaro, Italy
- Party: Christian Democracy; Italian People's Party; The Daisy; Southern Democratic Party; Democratic Party; Union of the Centre

Ottavio Gaetano Bruni (born 15 April 1944) is an Italian politician who served as mayor of Acquaro (1975–1985), president of the Province of Vibo Valentia (1999–2008) and member of the Regional Council of Calabria (2010–2014).

Political offices
Preceded by Enzo Romeo	President of the Province of Vibo Valentia; 1999–2008	Succeeded by Francesco De Nisi
