= Francesco De Nisi =

Italian politician

Francesco de Nisi

Member of the Regional Council of Calabria
- In office 29 October 2021 – 4 October 2025

President of the Province of Vibo Valentia
- In office 15 April 2008 – 10 November 2012
- Preceded by: Ottavio Bruni
- Succeeded by: Andrea Niglia

Mayor of Filadelfia
- In office 30 May 2006 – 16 May 2011
- Preceded by: Vito Francesco La Gala
- Succeeded by: Maurizio De Nisi

Member of the Provincial Council of Vibo Valentia
- In office 3 July 1999 – 26 February 2008

Personal details
- Born: 18 September 1968 (age 58) Filadelfia, Province of Catanzaro, Italy
- Party: Action (since 2023)
- Education: Polytechnic University of Milan
- Profession: Engineer

Francesco de Nisi (born 18 September 1968) is an Italian politician who served as mayor of Filadelfia (2006–2011), president of the Province of Vibo Valentia (2008–2012), and member of the Regional Council of Calabria (2021–2025).

Political offices
Preceded by Ottavio Bruni	President of the Province of Vibo Valentia; 2008–2012	Succeeded by Andrea Niglia
