= Il Quotidiano del Sud =

Italian daily newspaper

- Type: Daily newspaper
- Founder: Pantaleone Sergi
- Publisher: Edizioni Proposta Sud S.r.l.
- Editor-in-chief: Massimo Razzi
- Founded: 1995; 31 years ago
- Language: Italian
- Headquarters: Castrolibero, Cosenza, Italy
- ISSN: 2499-3468 (print); 2499-3026 (web)
- OCLC number: 1404861430
- Website: quotidianodelsud.it

Il Quotidiano del Sud (Italian pronunciation: [il kwotiˈdjaːno del ˈsud]; lit. 'The Daily of the South') is an Italian daily newspaper based in Castrolibero, Cosenza.

== History ==
The newspaper, originally titled Il Quotidiano di Cosenza e Provincia, was founded by Pantaleone Sergi in 1995. Its name was later changed to Il Quotidiano della Calabria, and it opened editorial offices in Catanzaro, Reggio Calabria, Vibo Valentia, and Crotone. In 2014, Il Quotidiano della Calabria, Il Quotidiano della Basilicata, and Corriere dell'Irpinia merged to form Il Quotidiano del Sud.

In 2023, it was reported that the newspaper received €1.8 million in public funding the year prior.

=== 'Ndrangheta threats to journalists ===
The newspaper and its journalists have faced threats for their reporting on the 'Ndrangheta. In October 2007, journalist Antonio Anastasi was attacked by hooded individuals outside his home in Crotone. In February 2010, journalist Giuseppe Baldessarro was mailed a death threat and lead pellets. In July 2010, two Molotov cocktails were planted by the entrance of the newspaper's office in Castrolibero. In October 2010, a death threat was mailed to journalist Saverio Puccio at the editorial office in Catanzaro.

In July 2014, journalist Michele Albanese was placed under police protection for his reporting on 'Ndrangheta activity in Oppido Mamertina. He had previously been the subject of threats dating back to 2010. On Christmas Eve of 2015, a bullet was mailed to the home of journalist Francesco Mobilio.

== Notable personnel ==
- Pietrangelo Buttafuoco
- Gianni Festa
- Riccardo Marassi
- Roberto Napoletano
- Pantaleone Sergi
- Cristina Vercillo
