= Vibo Marina =

Human settlement in Vibo Valentia, Calabria, Italy

Coordinates: 38°40′55″N 16°3′58″E

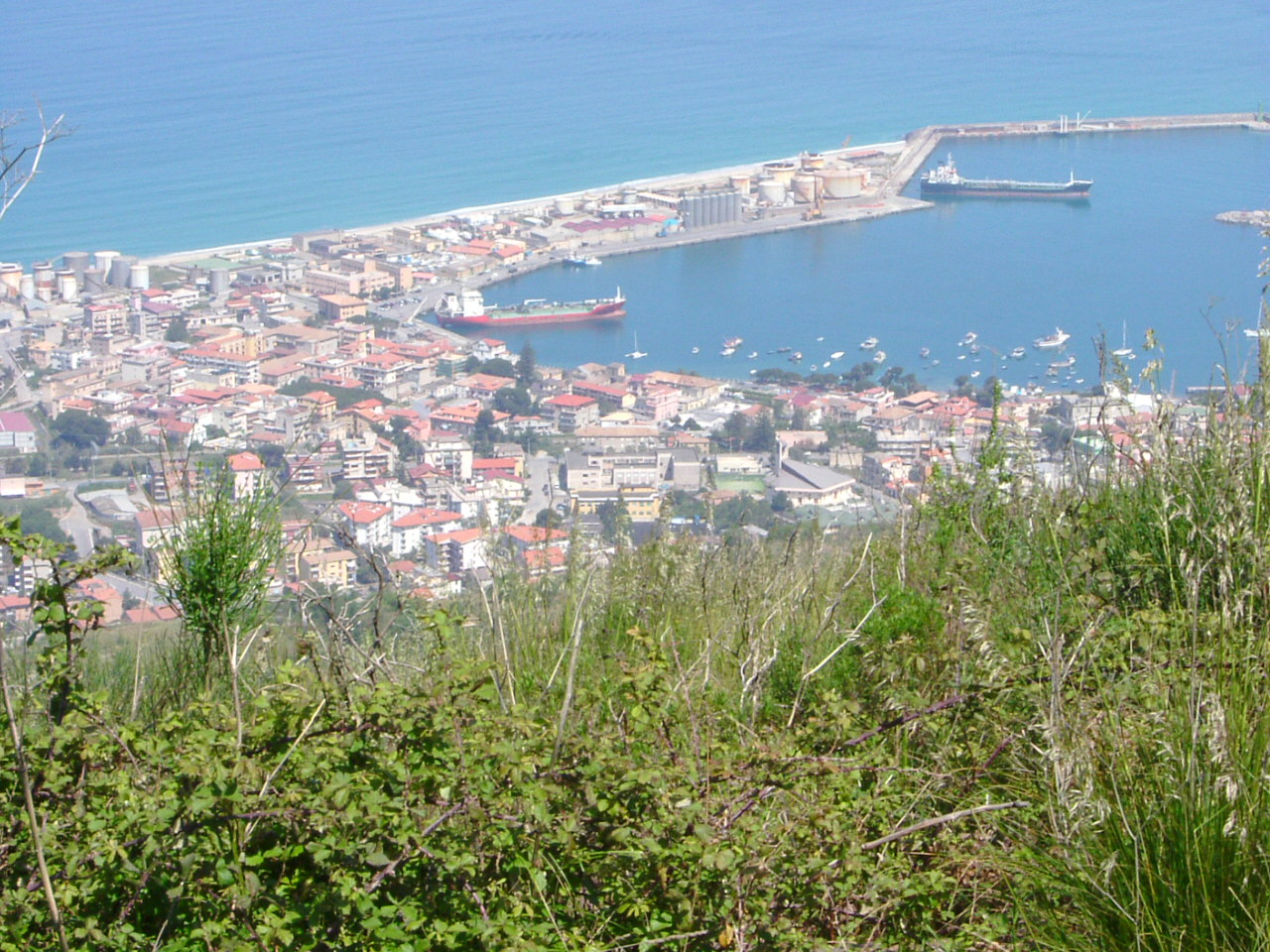
The port of Vibo Marina

Vibo Marina is a port town in the province of Vibo Valentia, in the Calabria region of southern Italy. It is a frazione of the town of Vibo Valentia. It has around 10,000 inhabitants.

The town lies in the Gulf of Saint Euphemia, on the Tyrrhenian Sea. Pizzo and Bivona are nearby; other important towns near Vibo Marina are Vibo Valentia, Lamezia Terme and Tropea.

== History ==
In the 3rd century BC, Agathocles the tyrant of Syracuse ordered the construction of a harbour where Vibo Marina now stands. The installation of the harbour goes from the caste of Bivona to the high part of Vibo Marina, where a Roman manor had existed in ancient times.

Vibo Marina was originally called Porto Santa Venere (Saint Venus' Harbour). A legend tells that the local fishermen discovered on the sandy shore a statue of Saint Venus. Under the Fascist government, the name was changed in 1928 to Vibo Marina.

=== Second World War ===
On 8 September 1943 part of the 8th Army, 231st Brigade landed at what the allies still referred to as Porto San Venere (Vibo Marina) with the intention of cutting off as many German units as possible, who were expected to retreat from the main force of the British Commonwealth Eighth Army landings, at the toe of Italy at Reggio Calabria, via the coast road Strada statale 18 and the rail line passing close to the port. The Operation Ferdy landing force consisted of naval units flagship Motor Torpedo Boat MTB 77; Monitor HMS Erebus (I02); Two Insect Class gunboats HMS Aphis and HMS Scarab; Two Landing Ship Tank (LST), 9 & 65; 18 Landing Craft Tank (LCT) including 4, 306, & 316; Two Landing Craft Gun including LCG 12; Two Landing Craft Flack (LCF); 24 Landing Craft Infantry (LCI) and Harbour Defence Motor Launch HDML 1128. The landings were led by 40 Commando and 3 Commando.

Enemy opposition to the landing was unexpectedly heavy included fire from machine guns, mortars and 88mm artillery guns. At 0700hrs, German Fw 190 aircraft attacked the ships and sank MTB 77 the flagship of the landing force. The injured Rear Admiral McGrigor was rescued by HDML 1128. The Monitor HMS Erebus, which was armed with twin 15” guns, was called in to provide much needed naval artillery fire at about 1745hrs, along with the two shallow draft Insect Class Gunboats Aphis and Scarab with their 6” guns.

Fighting continued the next day, an assault from Panzergrenadiers penetrated to within a mile of the landing beaches. However, by 2300hrs that night the German troops ceased their artillery fire, disengaged and headed rapidly north towards Sapri.

== Economy ==
It is an important industrial area in the economy of the Vibo Valentia province. Here there is an important commercial and tourist harbour for the petrol distribution, fish selling (especially tuna), Aeolian Islands sea connection, etc.

There are some industries for the manufacturing of oil.
