= Castrolibero =

- Comune
- Comune di Castrolibero
- Location within Italy Location within Calabria
- Coordinates: 39°19′N 16°12′E
- Country: Italy
- Region: Calabria
- Province: Cosenza (CS)
- Frazioni: Andreotta

Government
  - Mayor: Giovanni Greco

Area
  - Total: 11.56 km^{2} (4.46 sq mi)
- Elevation: 559 m (1,834 ft)

Population (30 November 2018)
  - Total: 9,713
  - Density: 840.2/km^{2} (2,176/sq mi)
- Demonym: Castroliberesi
- Time zone: UTC+1 (CET)
  - Summer (DST): UTC+2 (CEST)
- Postal code: 87040
- Dialing code: 0984
- Patron saint: St. Raphael
- Saint day: 24 October
- Website: Official website

Castrolibero is a town and comune in the province of Cosenza in the Calabria region of southern Italy.

== Twin towns ==
- Siemiatycze, Poland
- Għarb, Malta
