= Vibo Valentia =

Vibo Valentia Muntalaùni (Calabrian) Hipponion (Greek)
- Comune
- Comune di Vibo Valentia
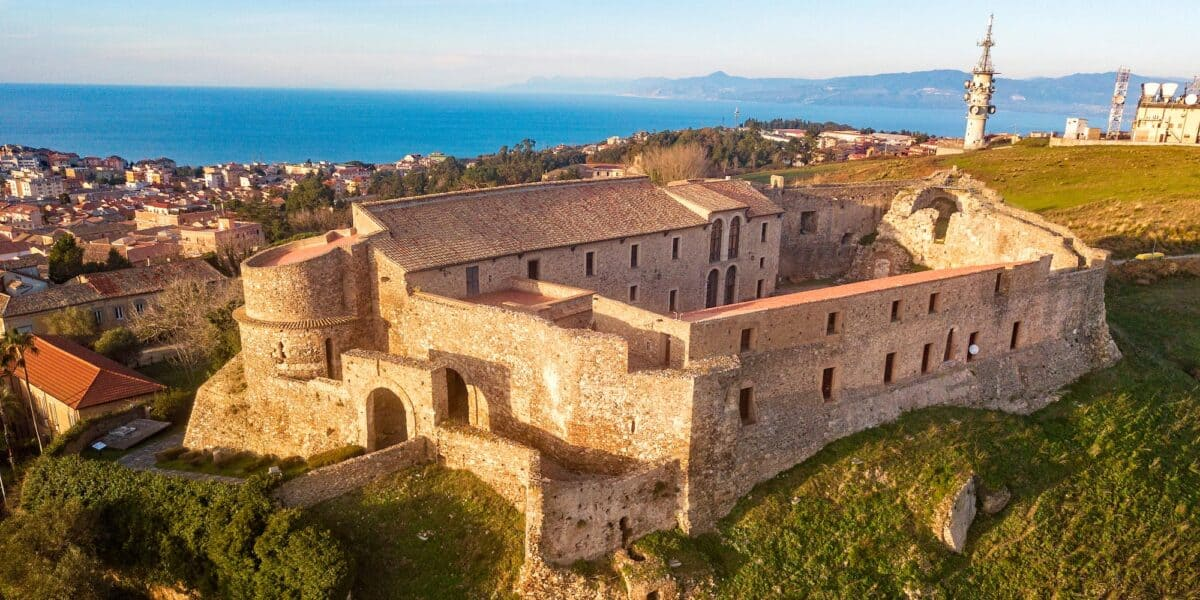
- Aerial view of the castle of Vibo Valentia

- Flag Coat of arms

- Location within Calabria Location within Italy
- Coordinates: 38°40′30″N 16°05′50″E
- Country: Italy
- Region: Calabria
- Province: Vibo Valentia (VV)
- Frazioni: Bivona, Longobardi, Piscopio, Porto Salvo, San Pietro, Vena Inferiore, Vena Media, Vena Superiore, Triparni, Vibo Marina

Government
  - Mayor: Enzo Romeo

Area
  - Total: 46.57 km^{2} (17.98 sq mi)
- Elevation: 476 m (1,562 ft)

Population (2026)
  - Total: 30,753
  - Density: 660.4/km^{2} (1,710/sq mi)
- Time zone: UTC+1 (CET)
  - Summer (DST): UTC+2 (CEST)
- Postal code: 89900, 89811
- Dialing code: 0963
- Website: Official website

Vibo Valentia (Italian: [ˈviːbo vaˈlɛntsja]; Monteleone before 1861; Monteleone di Calabria from 1861 to 1928; Calabrian: Vibbu Valenzia or Muntalaùni) is a town and comune (municipality) in the region of Calabria in southern Italy, near the Tyrrhenian Sea. It has 30,753 inhabitants.

It is the capital of the province of Vibo Valentia, and is an agricultural, commercial and tourist center (the most famous places nearby are Tropea, Ricadi and Pizzo).

There are also several large manufacturing industries, including the tuna district of Maierato. Very important for the local economy is Vibo Marina's harbour.

== History ==
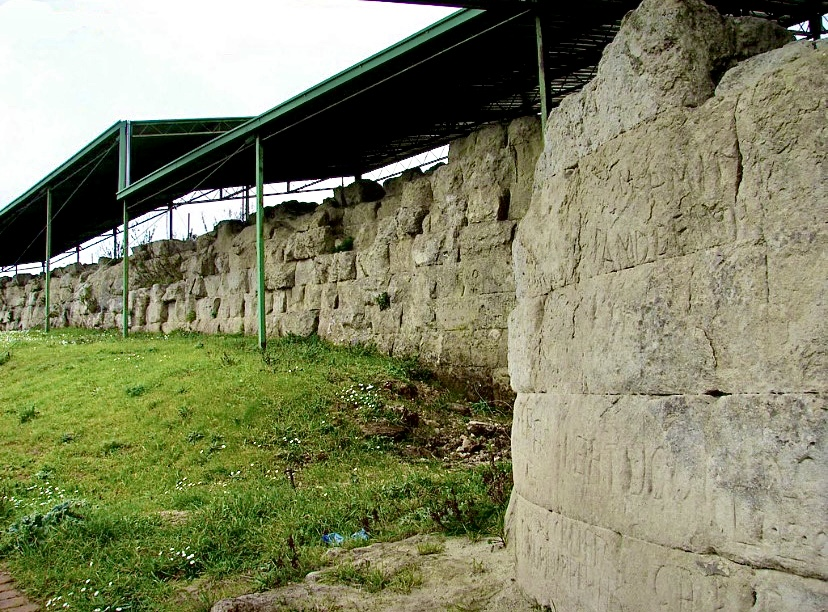
Walls of Hipponion

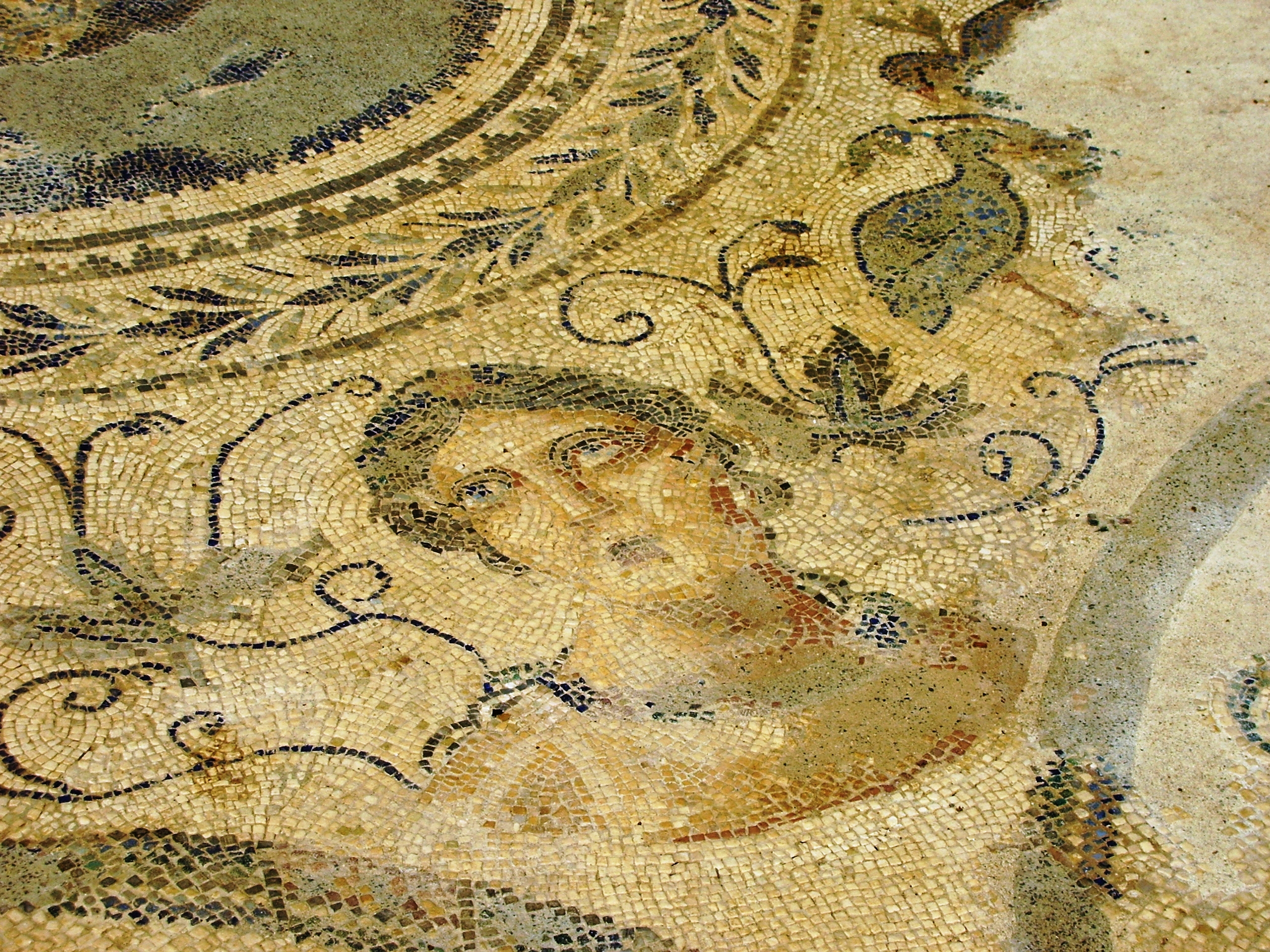
Mosaic

Vibo Valentia was originally the Greek colony of Hipponion (Ancient Greek: Ἱππώνιον). It was founded, probably around the late 7th century BC, by inhabitants of Locri, a principal city of the region on the Ionian Sea. The massive city wall of 7 km circumference, a length of which can still be seen today, enclosed an area over the hill and down to the port. It had cylindrical towers at intervals and its monumental size testifies to the wealth of the city and the wars the city was involved in throughout its long history.

Diodorus Siculus reports that the city was taken in 388 BC by Dionysius the Elder tyrant of Syracuse, who deported all the population. The population came back in 378 BC, with the help of the Carthaginians. In the following years Hipponion came under the dominion of the Bruttii, who controlled most of the present Calabria. After the town fell to Rome, the name was Latinised to Hipponium. The town became a Roman colony in 194 BC with the name of Vibo Valentia.

It enjoyed a period of prosperity during the late Republic and early Empire, and Cicero had a villa here. The town was almost completely abandoned after the fall of the Western Roman Empire. In 1070, the Normans built a castle at the site of the old Acropolis, and in 1235 a new city was established by Frederick II, Holy Roman emperor and king of Sicily, with the name of Monteleone. The city got back the old Roman name of Vibo Valentia only in 1928.

== Climate ==
Climate data for Vibo Valentia (2000–2020)
Month	Jan	Feb	Mar	Apr	May	Jun	Jul	Aug	Sep	Oct	Nov	Dec	Year
Mean daily maximum °C (°F)	11.0 (51.8)	11.1 (52.0)	13.9 (57.0)	16.8 (62.2)	20.6 (69.1)	24.6 (76.3)	26.9 (80.4)	27.3 (81.1)	24.1 (75.4)	20.7 (69.3)	16.5 (61.7)	12.5 (54.5)	18.8 (65.9)
Daily mean °C (°F)	8.4 (47.1)	8.2 (46.8)	10.6 (51.1)	13.3 (55.9)	17.0 (62.6)	20.9 (69.6)	23.3 (73.9)	23.8 (74.8)	20.7 (69.3)	17.4 (63.3)	13.6 (56.5)	9.9 (49.8)	15.6 (60.1)
Mean daily minimum °C (°F)	5.8 (42.4)	5.4 (41.7)	7.4 (45.3)	9.8 (49.6)	13.4 (56.1)	17.2 (63.0)	19.8 (67.6)	20.2 (68.4)	17.3 (63.1)	14.2 (57.6)	10.6 (51.1)	7.2 (45.0)	12.4 (54.2)
Average precipitation mm (inches)	123 (4.8)	90 (3.5)	86 (3.4)	66 (2.6)	47 (1.9)	24 (0.9)	23 (0.9)	30 (1.2)	64 (2.5)	103 (4.1)	109 (4.3)	137 (5.4)	902 (35.5)
Average precipitation days (≥ 1.0 mm)	10	10	8	9	6	4	3	3	7	8	11	12	91
Source 1: Climi e viaggi
Source 2: Weatherbase (precipitation)

== Demographics ==
As of 2026, the population is 30,753, of which 48.5% are males, and 51.5% are females. Minors make up 14.8% of the population, and seniors make up 25.7%.

Historical population

Year	Pop.	±%
1861	11,566	—
1871	13,359	+15.5%
1881	13,120	−1.8%
1901	14,751	+12.4%
1911	14,520	−1.6%
1921	15,385	+6.0%
1931	16,800	+9.2%
1936	17,779	+5.8%

Year	Pop.	±%
1951	22,740	+27.9%
1961	25,451	+11.9%
1971	31,133	+22.3%
1981	31,516	+1.2%
1991	34,836	+10.5%
2001	33,957	−2.5%
2011	33,357	−1.8%
2021	31,480	−5.6%

Source: ISTAT

=== Immigration ===
As of 2025, immigrants make up 6.1% of the population. The 5 largest foreign countries of birth are Morocco, Romania, Ukraine, Argentina, and Bulgaria.

== Bishopric ==
A Diocese of Vibo Valentia was established in 451 AD and suppressed in 1083 AD when it was incorporated into the Diocese of Mileto.

In 1968 it was restored as a titular see. The title has been assigned to:

- Andreas Rigracher (1969–1970)
- Luciano Angeloni (1970–1996)
- Aldo Cavalli (1996–present)

== Main sights ==
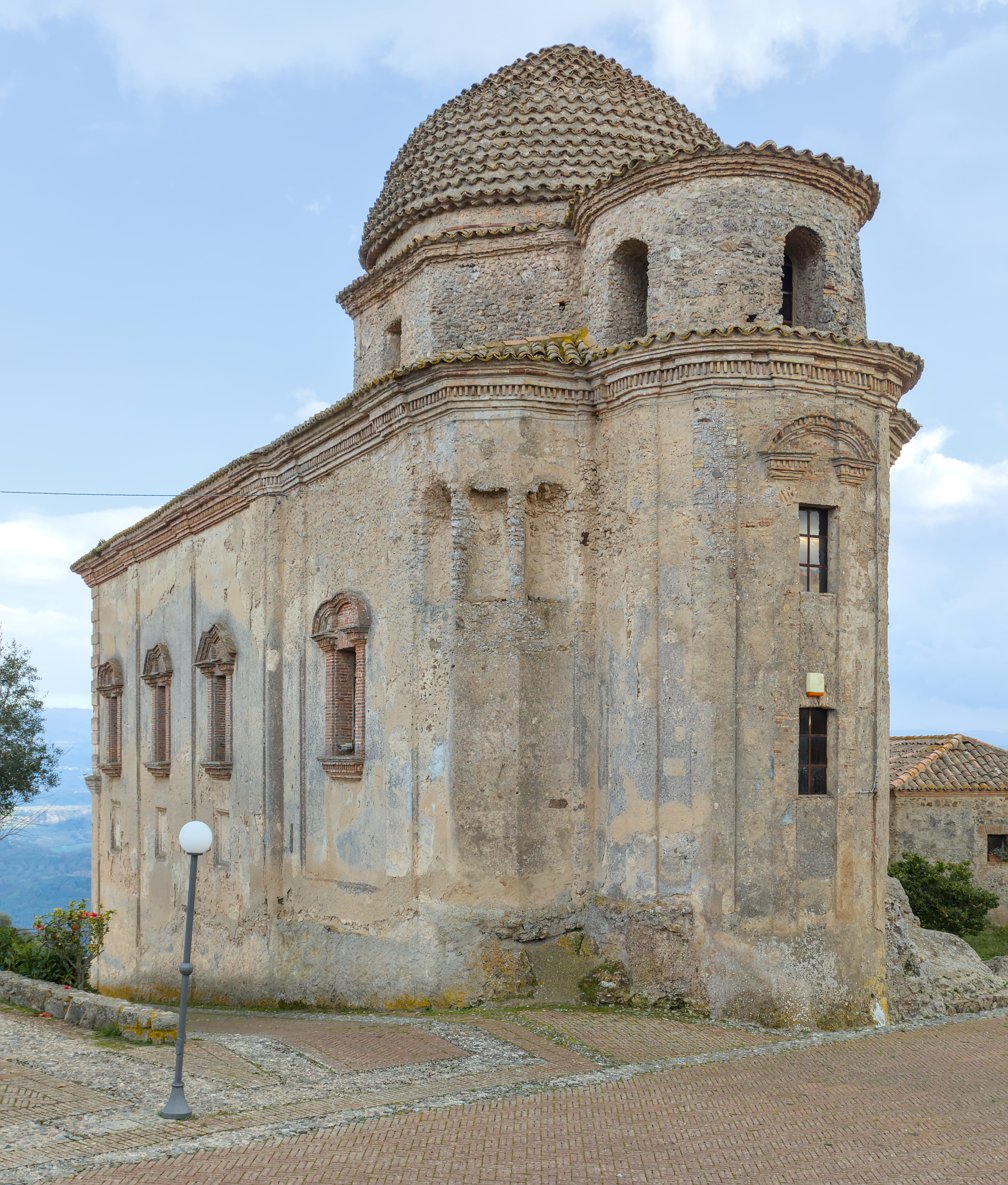
Santa Ruba (c. 1000).

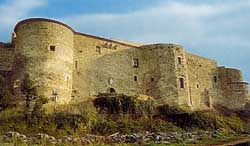
The castle.

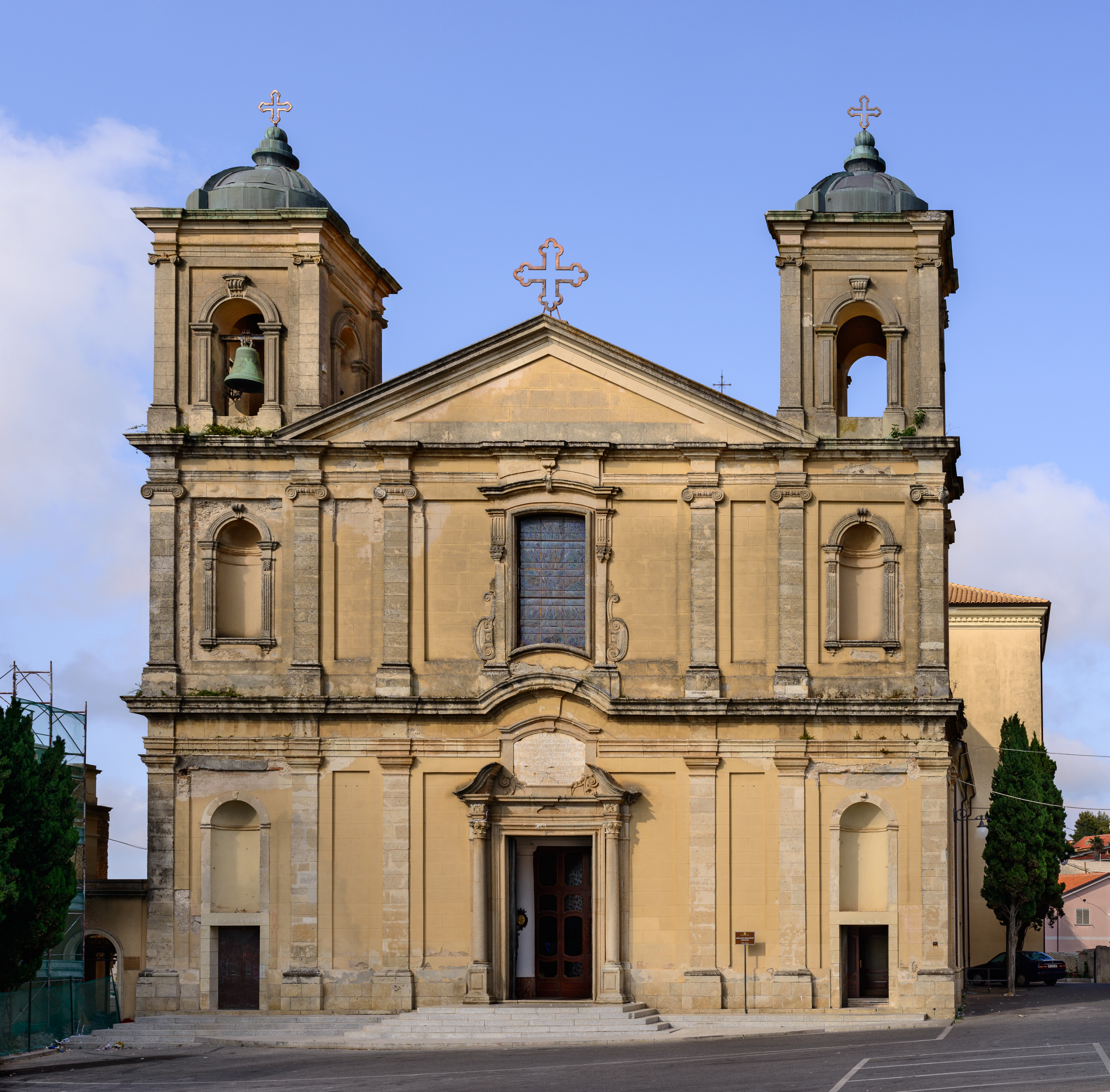
The dome Santa Maria Maggiore

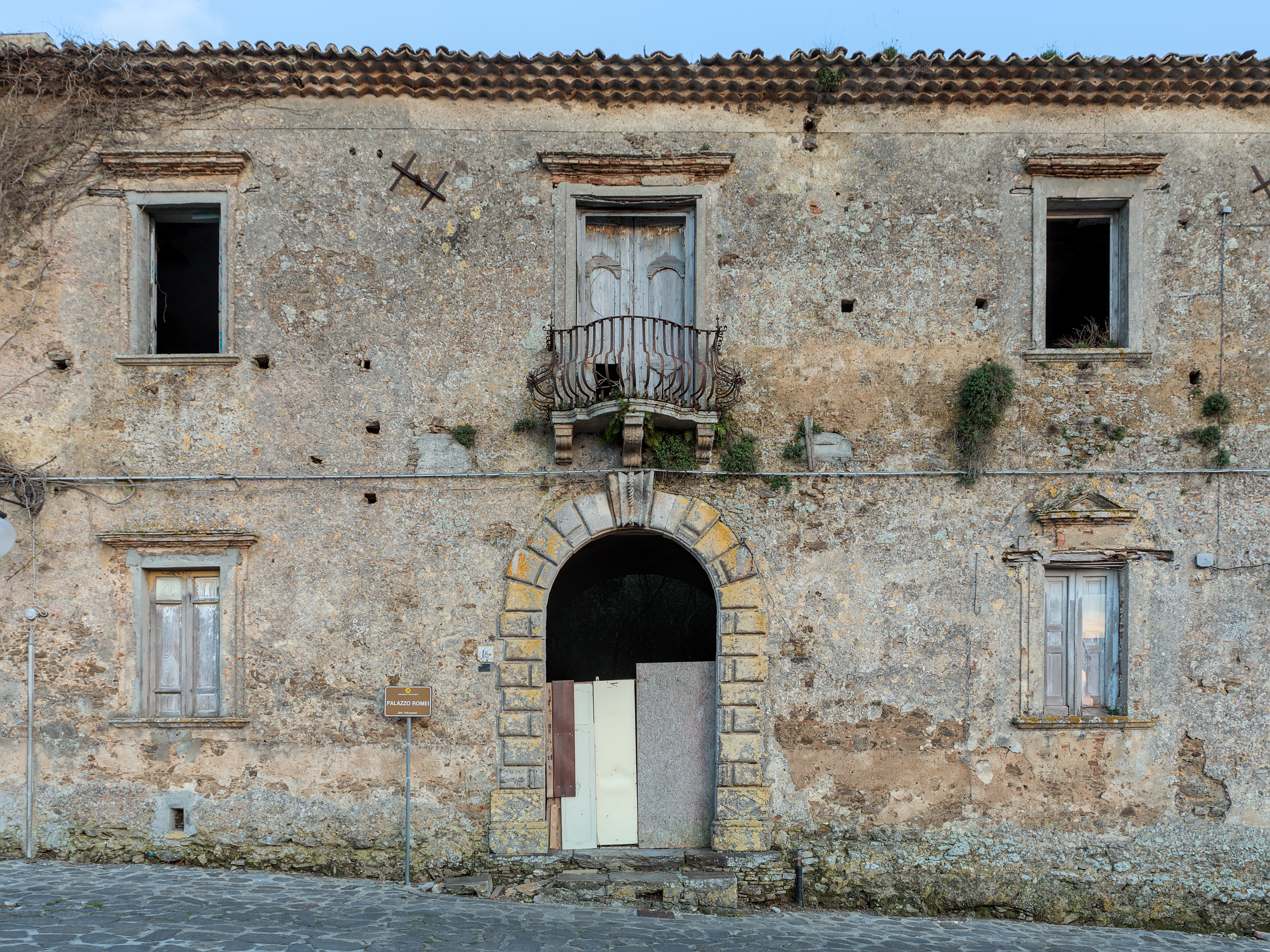
Palazzo Romei, one of the several decayed palaces in the old town.

- Norman-Hohenstaufen Castle, located most likely on the site of Hipponion acropolis, and built around 1000. For its construction materials from the Greek temples nearby were used. It was damaged by an earthquake in 1783. Today the castle is home to a state museum.
- Walls of Hipponion, including about 350 metres (1,150 ft) of remains and foundations of eight towers, each with an estimated height of 10 metres (33 ft).
- Church of Santa Maria Maggiore e San Leoluca (Cathedral), built in the 9th century over the remains of a Byzantine basilica. It has an 18th-century marble high altar with a 16th-century sculpture of "Madonna della Neve", and a Renaissance triptych.
- Santa Ruba: (c. 1000), church built during the reign of Pope Callixtus II. It has a large cupola in Oriental style. It is located halfway between Vibo Valentia and San Gregorio d'Ippona.
- Church of the Rosario (c. 1337), located over a Roman temple. Originally in Gothic style, it was remade after the 1783 earthquake. Moreover, it preserves different paintings of the local artist Giulio Rubino as well as 5 polychrome wooden statues of the Sorrowful Mysteries and a Risen Christ made by Ludovico and Domenico Rubino (brothers of Giulio, the painter), carried in procession during the Holy Week.
- Church of Carmine: built in the 17th century with a single-nave and an oval shape. The convent has been the city hospital for a long time.
- Church of Santa Maria degli Angeli: built between 1621 and 1666, at first annexed to the convent of the Reformed Friars Minor (now National Boarding School), it is handled by Capuchin Fathers. It preserves a wooden Cross called "of Angels" of an unknown author of '600, destination of thousands of devotees who go on pilgrimage every year by tradition on every Friday in March.
- Church of Saint Michael: inside there are a paint by Luca Giordano, San Michele che scaccia Lucifero, and a paint by Ludovico Mazzanti, Estasi di Sant'Ignazio.
- Church of Saint Joseph: wanted by the Jesuit Fathers, it was opened to worship in 1701 with the name of Saint Ignatius or of Jesus; it preserves several paintings including The vision of Saint Ignatius and sculptures like the wooden composition of Saint Joseph on the high altar.
- Church of the Holy Spirit: built in 1579, it is still deconsecrated; it was the first church of the city before the construction of the current one. Inside different artistic works were preserved until its closing and then they were moved to other churches in the city.
- Church of Santa Maria la Nova: built in 1521 with the name of Santa Maria di Gesù by duke Ettore Pignatelli, it preserves the sarcophagus of him. During the Napoleonic domination it was used as stable and armory; then, in 1837, it was restored and reopened by Enrico Gagliardi. Inside there are many works by the Flemish painter Dirk Hendricksz.
- Church of Santa Maria del Soccorso: built around 1632, it was reconstructed in 1791 based on the drawings provided by Bernardo Morena.
- La Madonnella: small church built on the site of the ancient convent of the Capuchins.
- Church of Saint Anthony of Padua: built during the 17th century, it was annexed to the convent of Friars Minor Capuchin; on the inside there are one painting by Luca Giordano, La Madonna col bambino tra i Santi Anna e Felice, and one by Pacecco De Rosa, l'Immaculata con i santi Francesco e Antonio.

== International relations ==
=== Twin towns – sister cities ===
- Corleone, Palermo, Sicily, Italy
- Ituzaingó, Argentina
- Ruda Śląska, Poland
- Vrnjačka Banja, Serbia
