= Vallata dello Stilaro =

Valley in Reggio Calabria, Italy

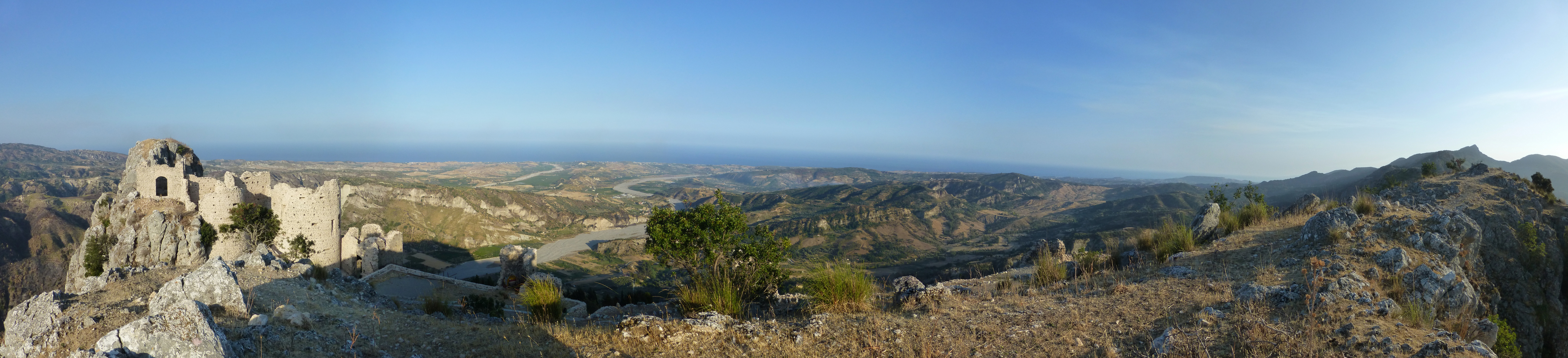
Vallata dello Stilaro Landscape from Monte Consolino

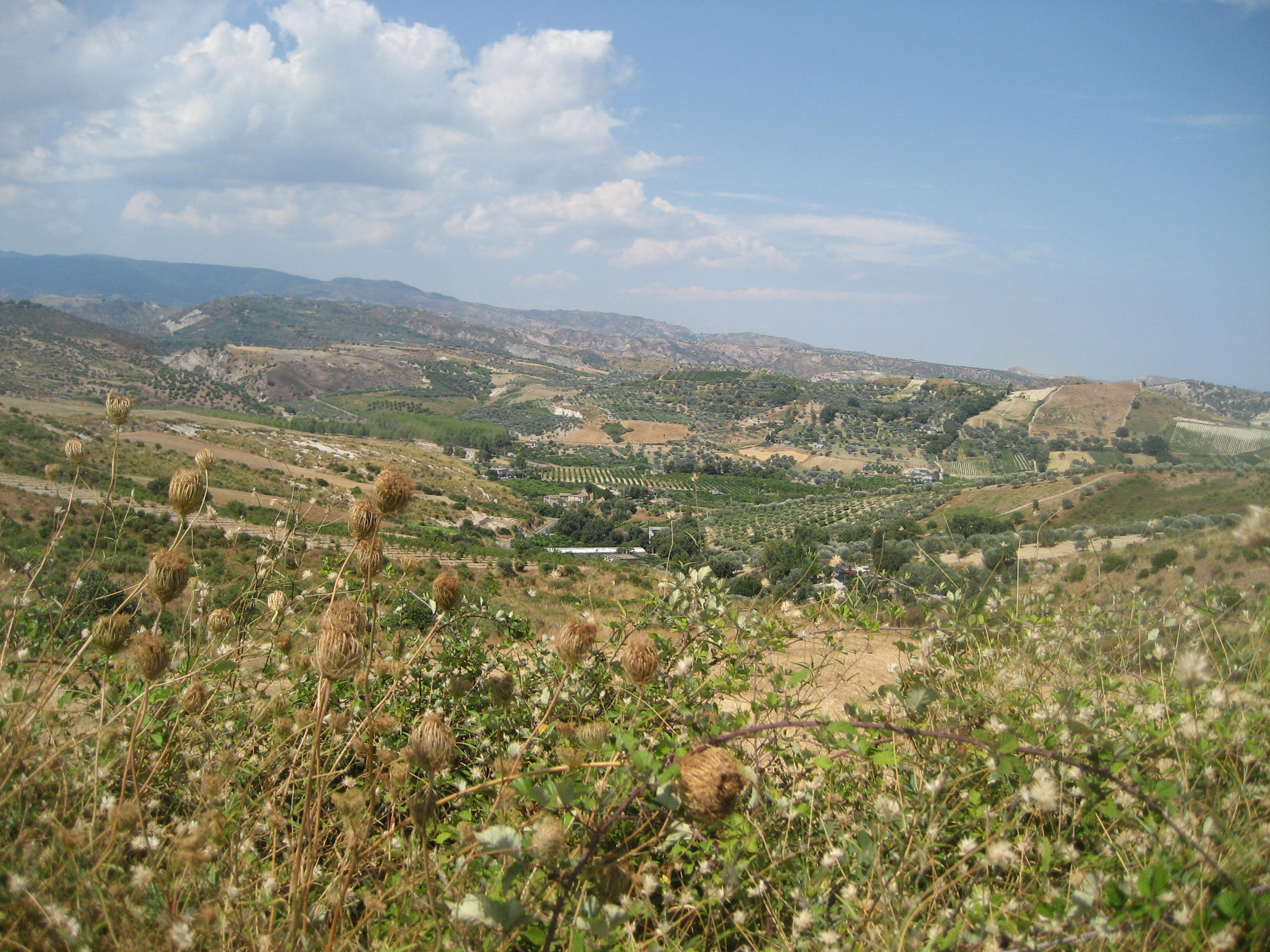
View of the valley.

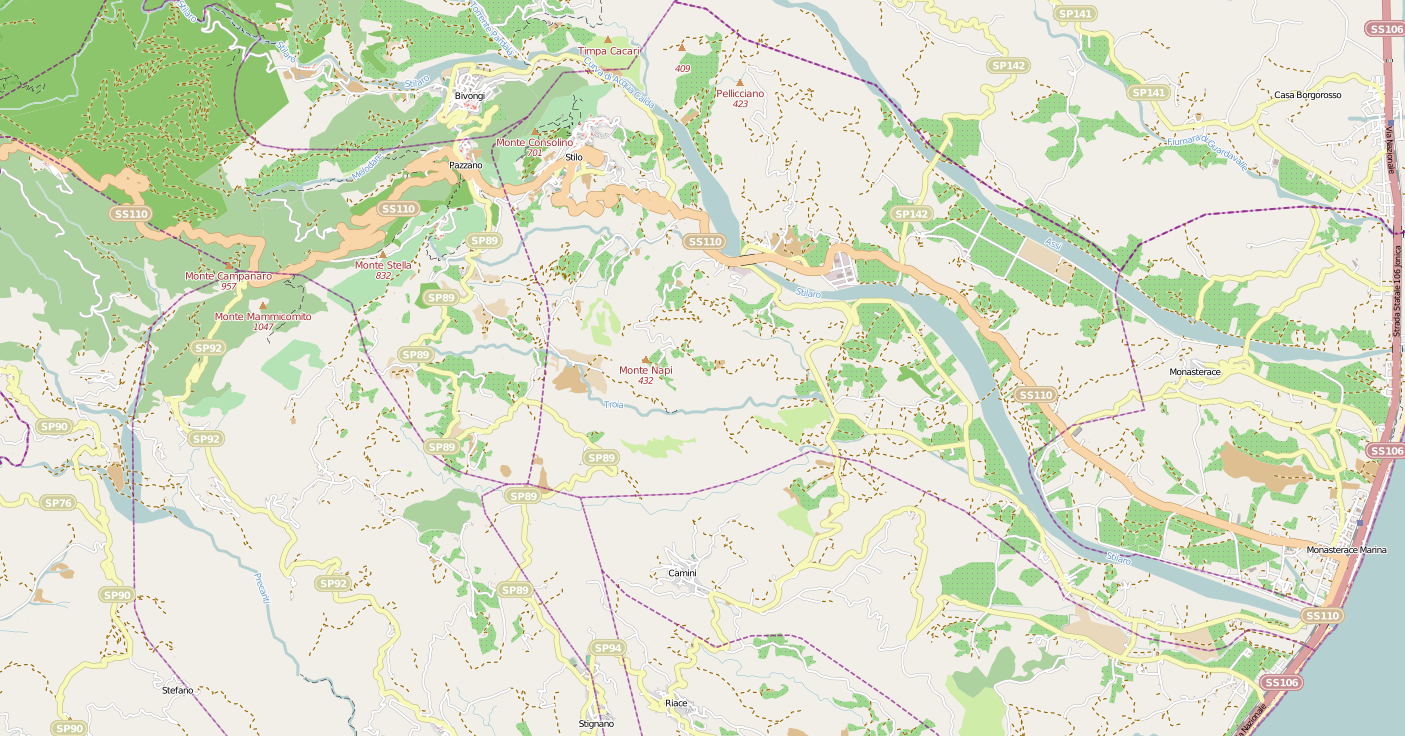
Vallata dello Stilaro map

The Vallata dello Stilaro (the Valley of Stilaro) is a valley in the Province of Reggio Calabria of Southern Italy. It takes its name from river that flow in the area, the Stilaro.

The principal settlements present in the valley are Bivongi, Monasterace, Pazzano and Stilo. The Ecomuseo delle ferriere e fonderie di Calabria, preserves and promotes the natural, artistic and cultural things of the place.

== History ==
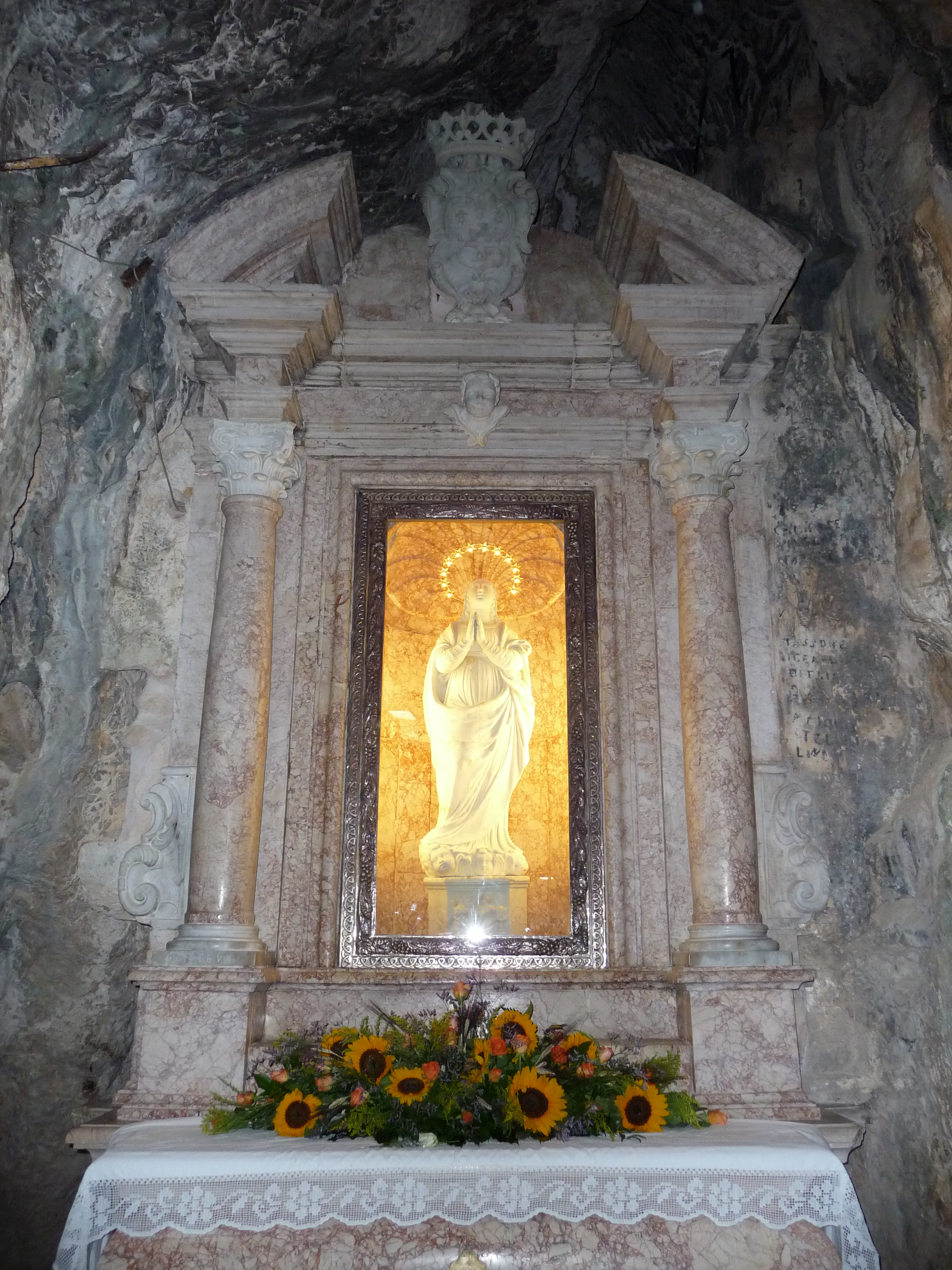
Madonna della Stella at Eremo di Monte Stella

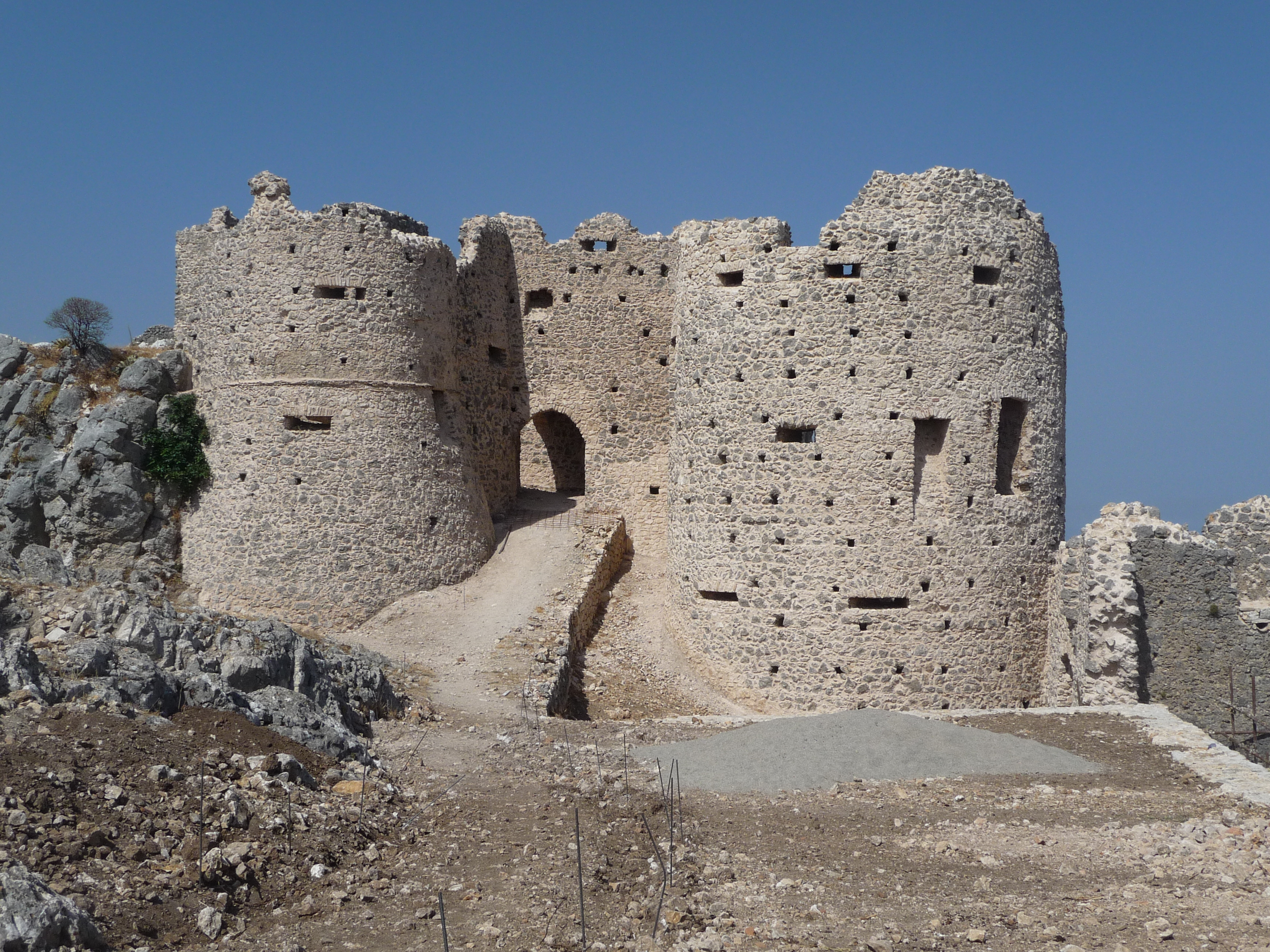
Norman castle at Stilo

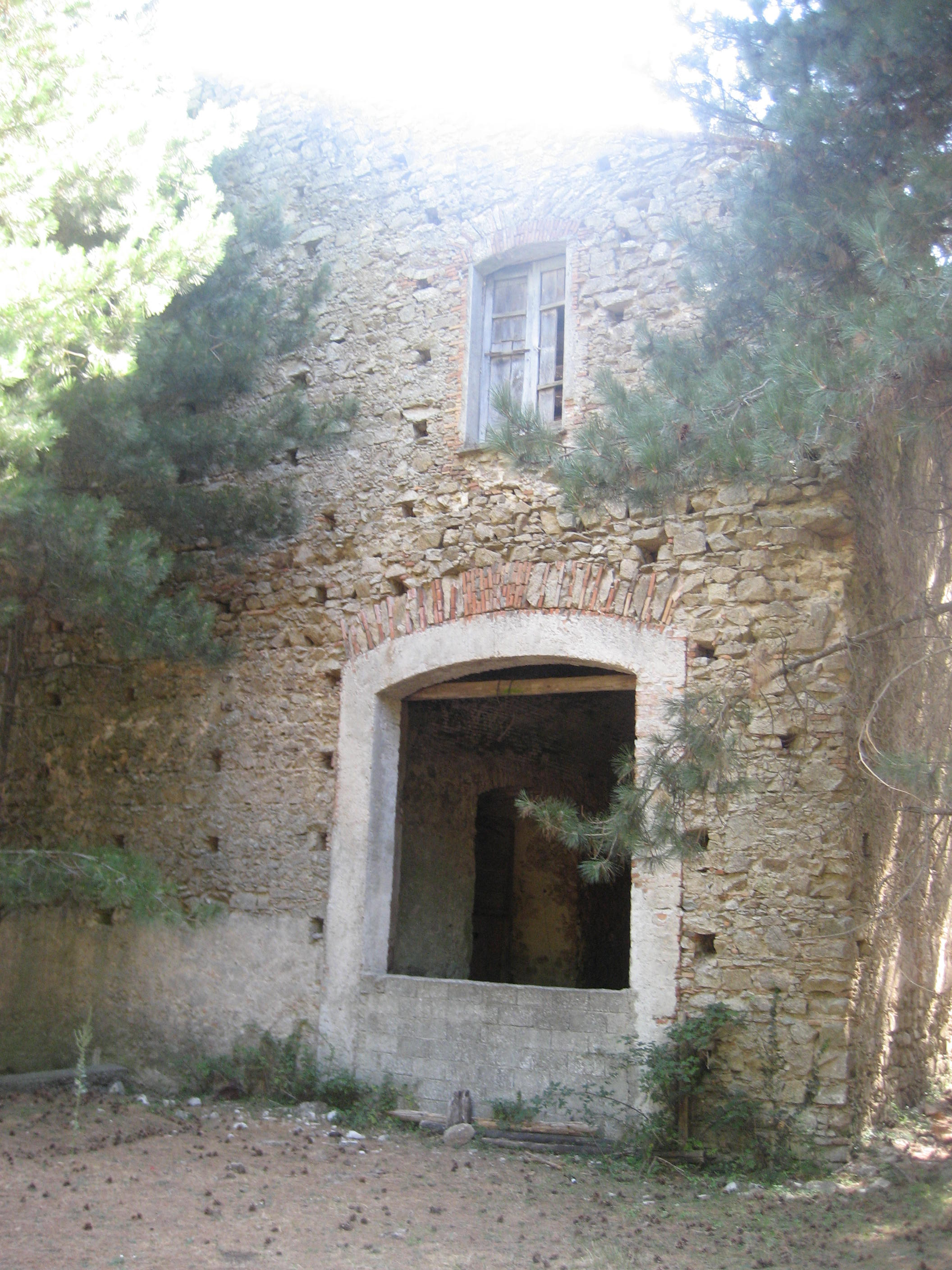
Blast furnace at Ferdinandea's Foundry at Stilo

The first evidence of settlements in the valley come from the ancient Greeks between the 8th and 7th centuries BC where along the coast, near the Assi river, the established the little colony of Caulonia, estimated to have included 10,000 people. Kaulon trades with inland indigenous people that mined minerals. They coined money with local silver. For its sources Kaulon was desired by Locri and Kroton colonies. In the first half of the 4th century BC, the Stilaro river (at that time called Elleporo) was the site of an important battle between Dionisio I and Lega italiota (italiota league) made up by a group of colonies of Magna Grecia. Lega italiota was defeated.

After that, the region was conquered by Romans, who largely mined copper and created a colonial penalty for "damnata ad metalla" and deforesting the valley for wood and shipbuilding.

In the 10th century under the Byzantine empire, there was economic and demographic growth and 22 calasi (little villages) with 37 convents, churches, and hermit caves were established by the Greek monks of Saint Basilio. The "Casale of Stilo" grew in importance and incorporated Pazzano, Stignano, Guardavalle, Riace and Camini "casalia".

On 15 July 982 AD, the Battle of Stilo was fought between Ottone II and a Byzantine/Arab alliance which won.

The first iron foundries come out at 1516, owned by Charles V, some of those were sold between 1523 and 1523 with two diplomas to his esquire Cesare Fieramosca: Campoli Village's foundries and Bivongi foundry. In this Norman period the valley turn to Catholicism, and the Hermit of Monte Stella is turned in a sanctuary dedicated to Mary. A statue was located in the cave.

At the end of 16th century there was an increase in mining at the Complesso siderurgico dell'Assi (Assi iron complex). In 1771 a new iron complex was created near the Serre mountain chain and Valley of Stilaro: Polo siderurgico di Mongiana

In 1811, under French power, Stilo villages: Camini, Pazzano, Placanica and Riace became autonomous comunes (Italian for villages). During the Kingdom of Italy, in 1875 two railways came to the area. In 1881, 200,000 ducati was spent to build a new route to link the Ionian Sea with the Tyrrhenian Sea that cross the Valley of Stilaro and Serre mountains (future Statale State 110).

In 1922 and 1923 two small hydroelectric power plants were built in Bivongi.

On 9 July 1940, during the Second World War, east of Cape Stilo, the Battle of Punta Stilo took place between the Italian and British navies.

In 2012 was announced the discovery of a pretended paleolithic settlement in Boario locality at Stilo.

== See also ==
- Locride
- Stilaro
- Ecomuseo delle ferriere e fonderie di Calabria

== Gallery ==
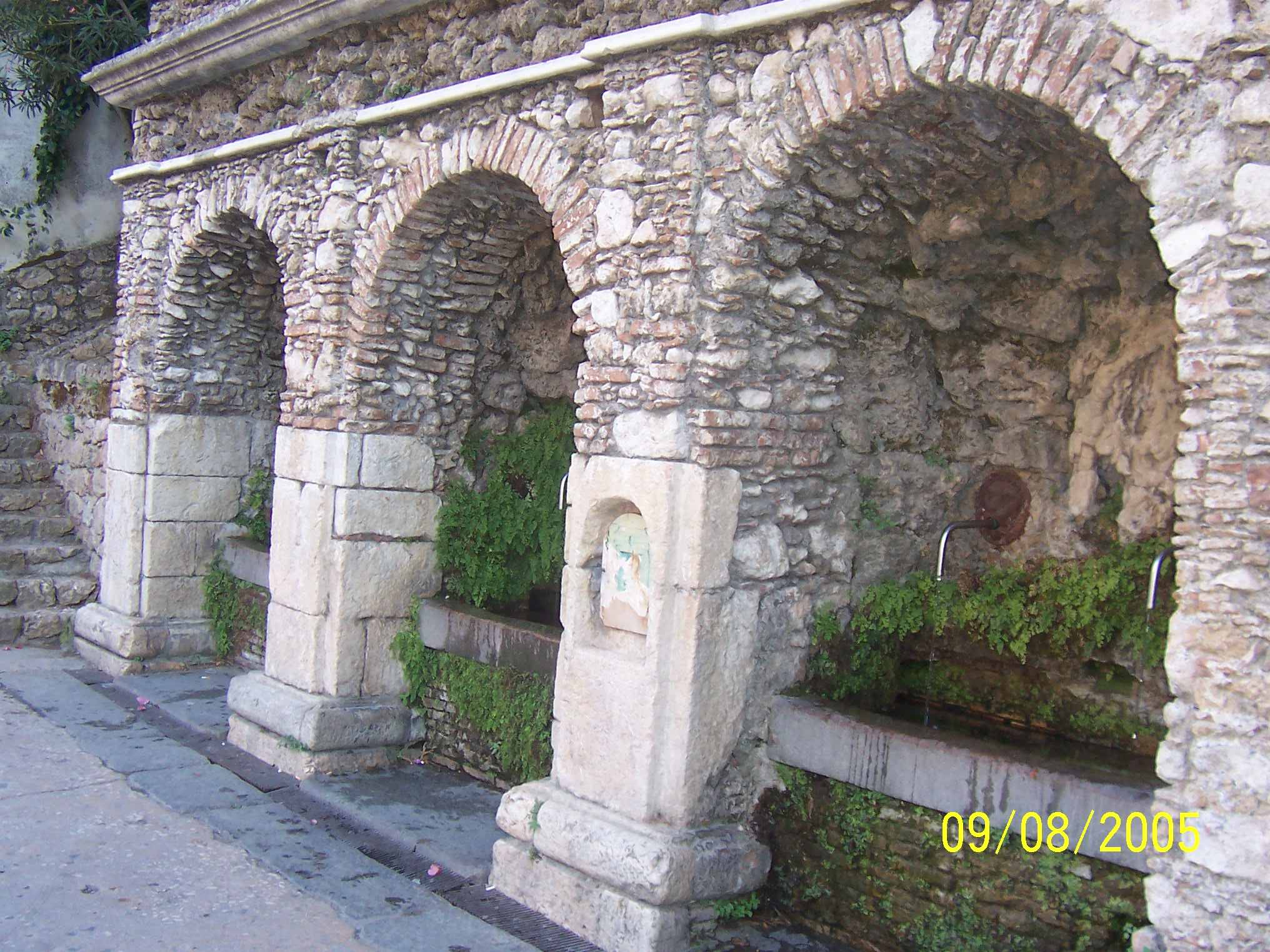
Fontana Vecchia (Pazzano)

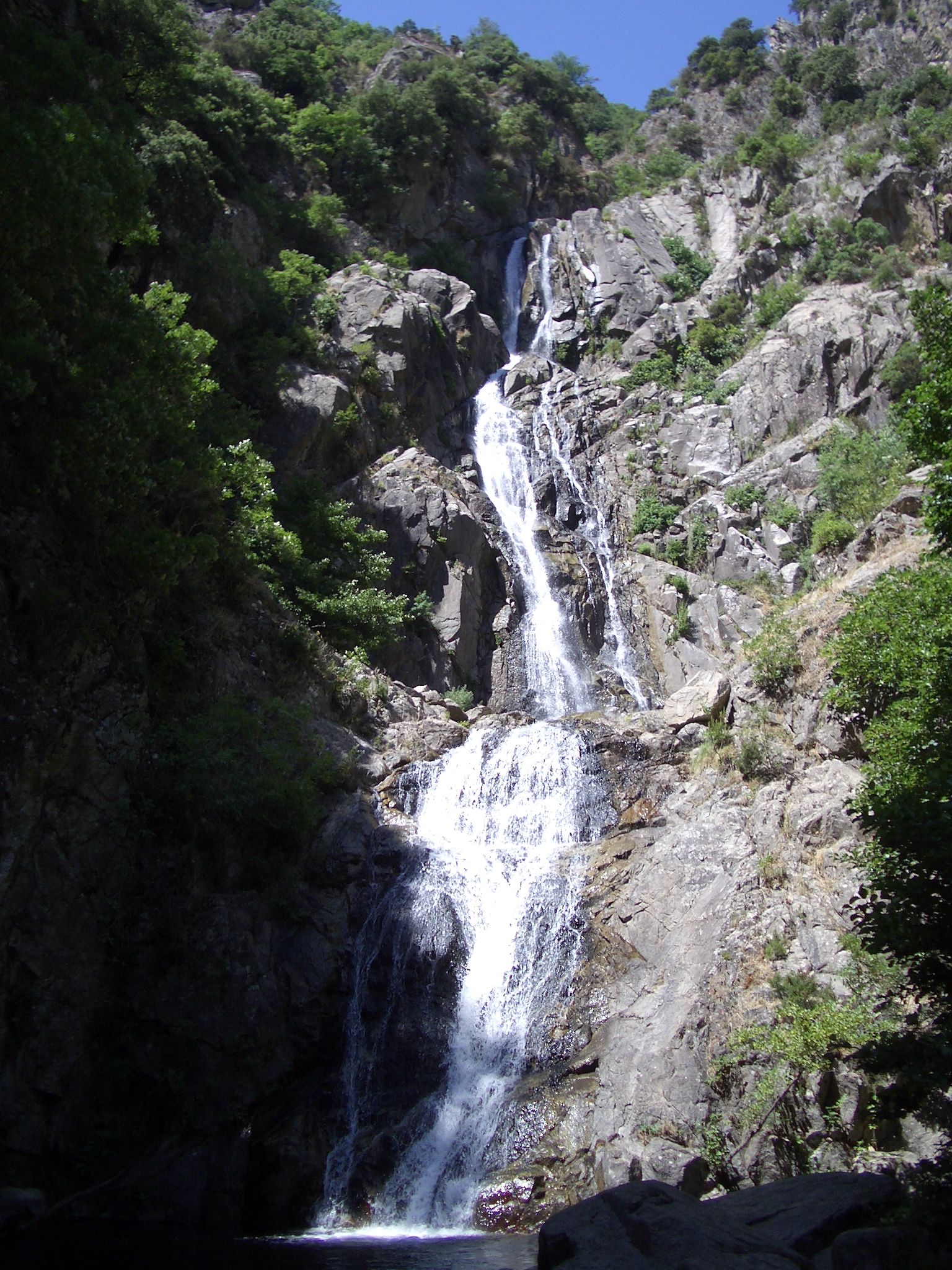
Cascata del Marmarico

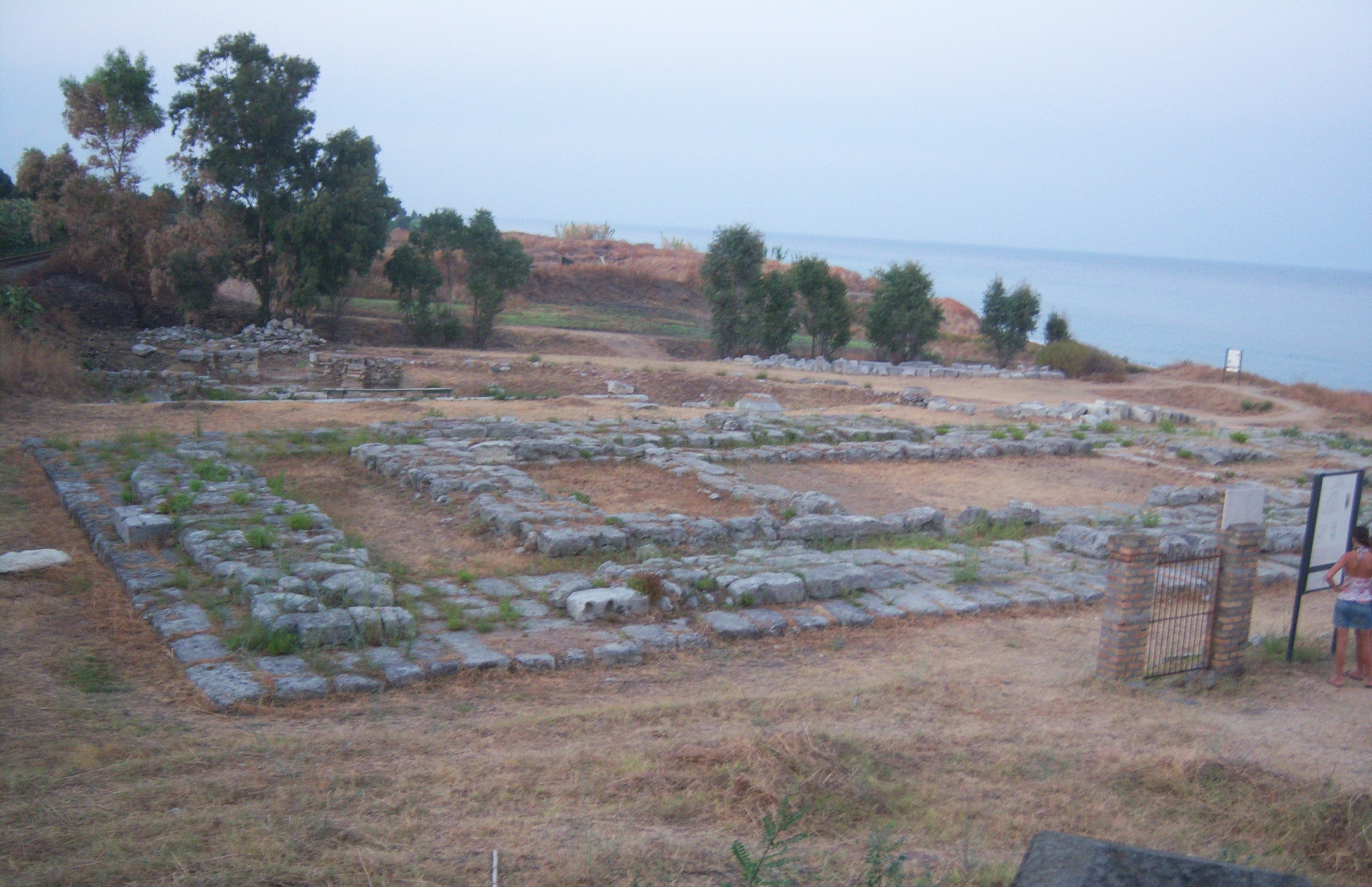
Remains of Caulonia (Monasterace)

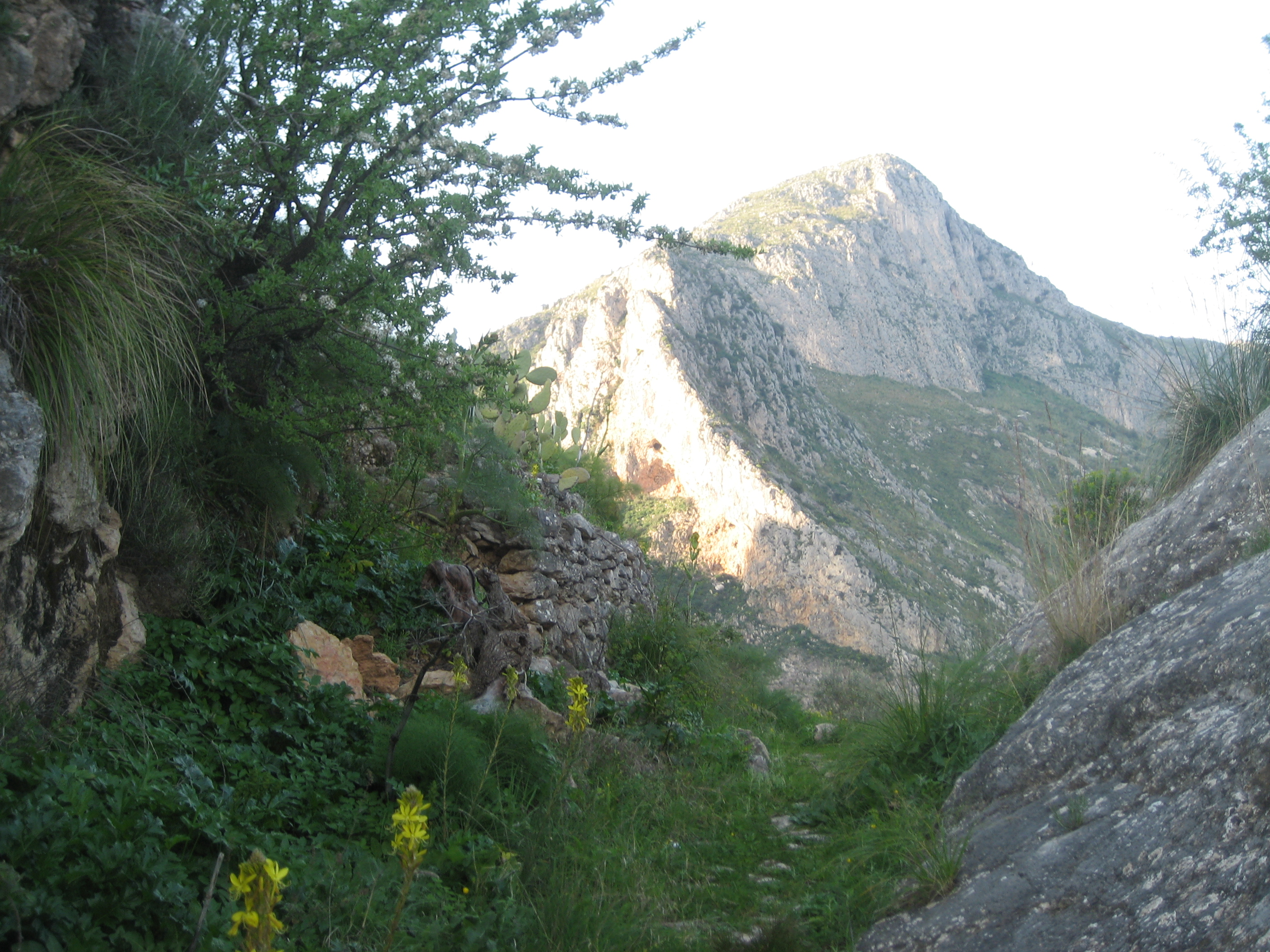
Monte Consolino

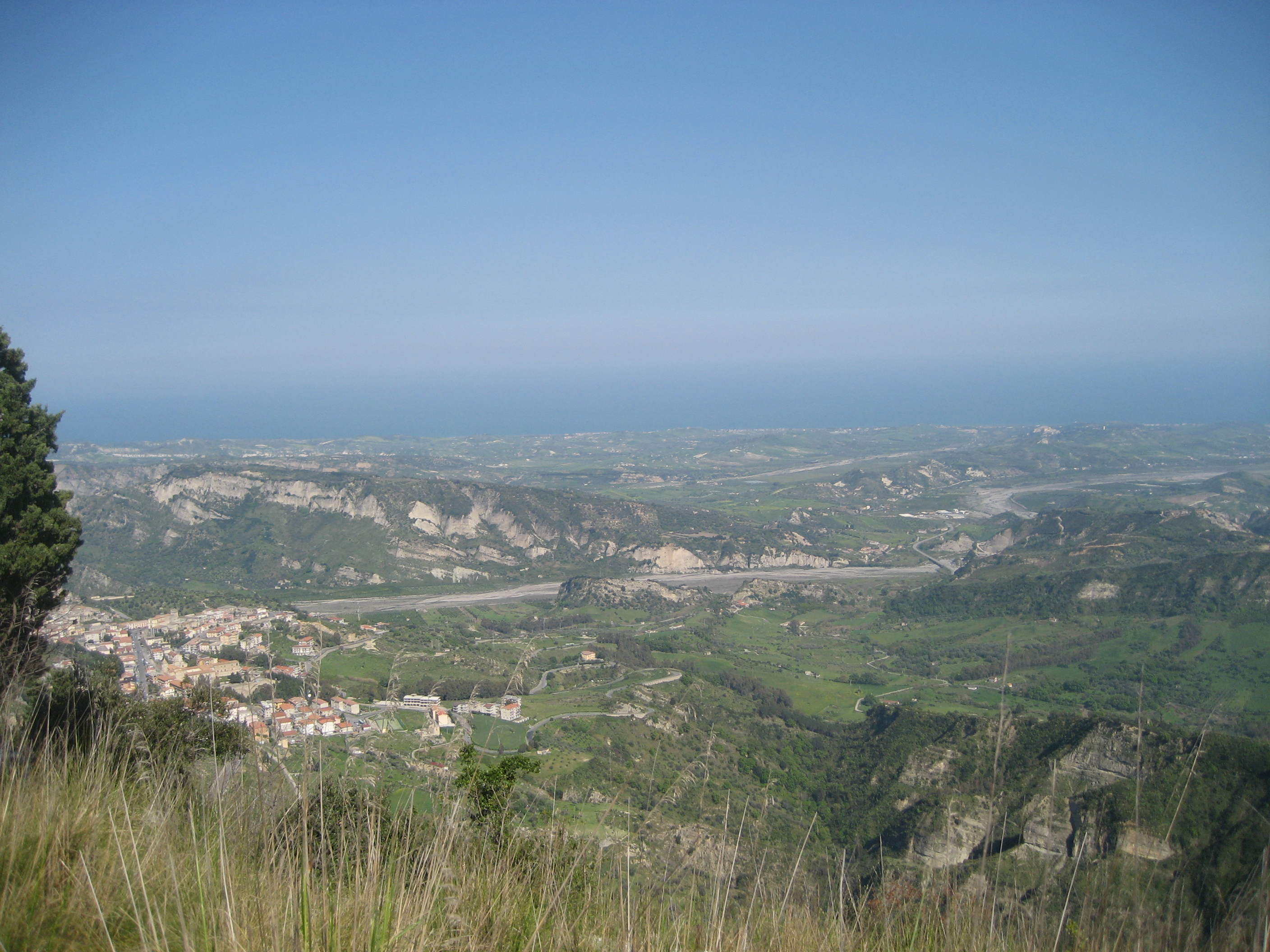
Stilaro

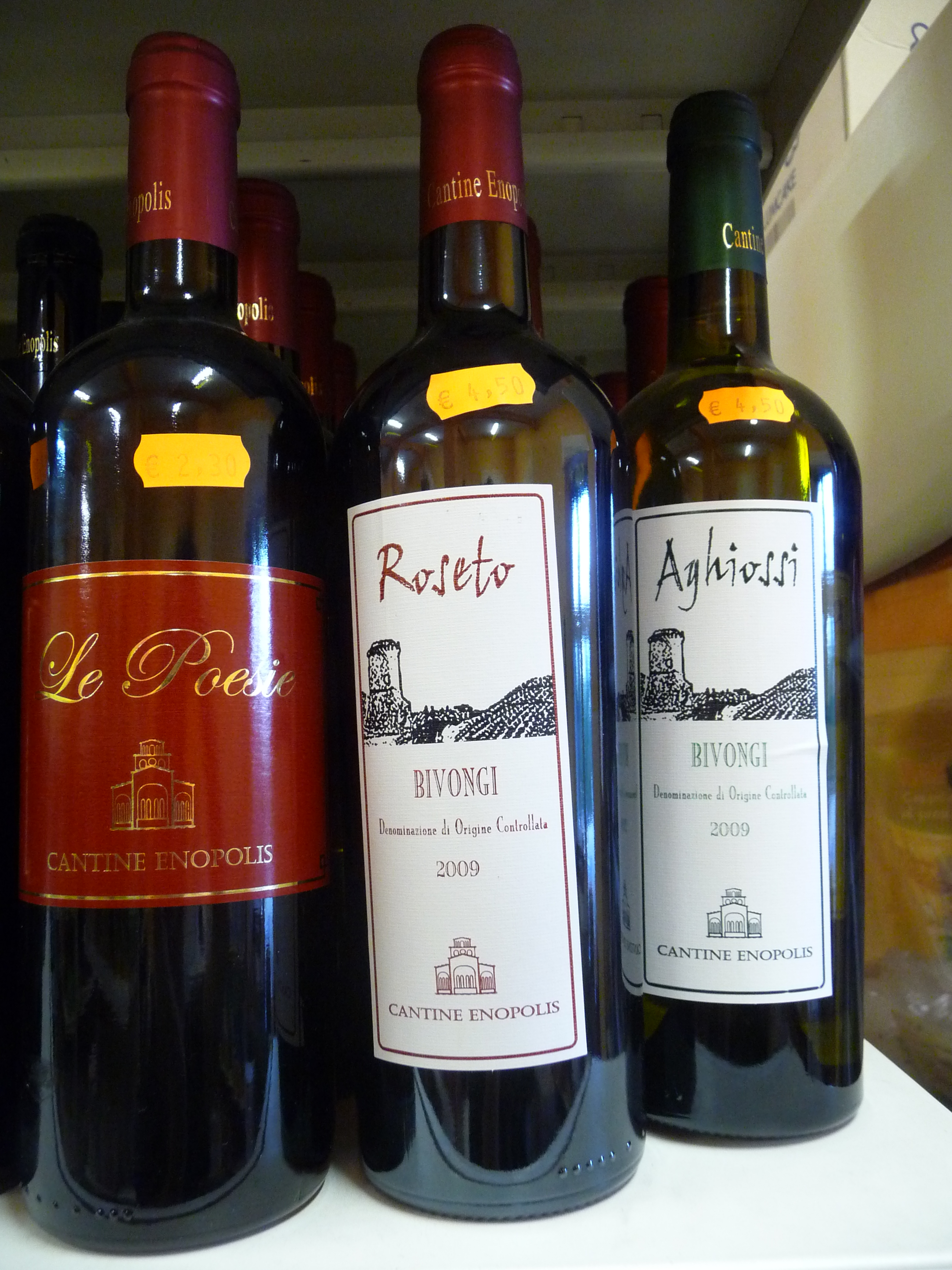
Bivongi wines

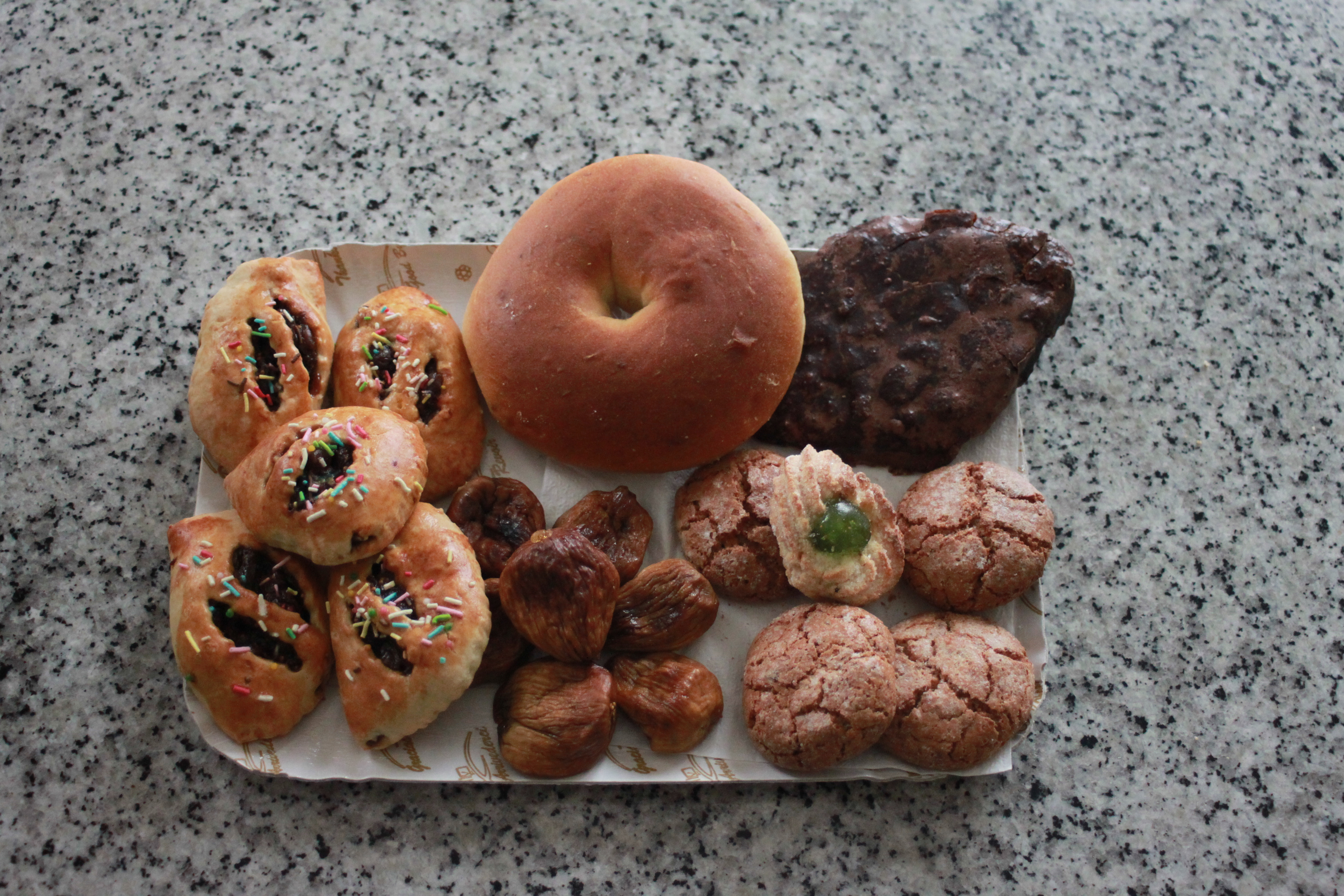
Vallata dello Stilato sweets

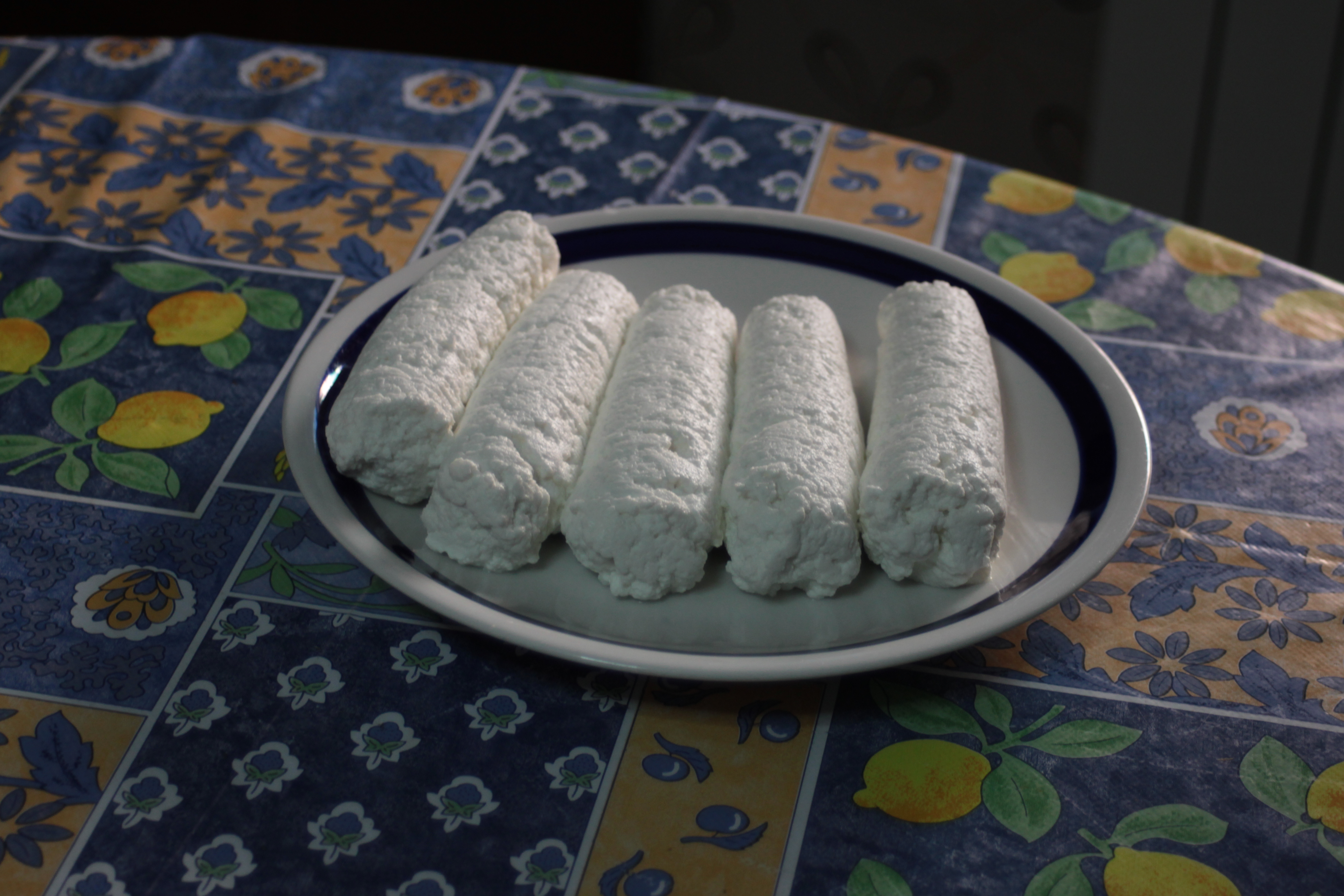
Vallata dello Stilaro's Ricotta

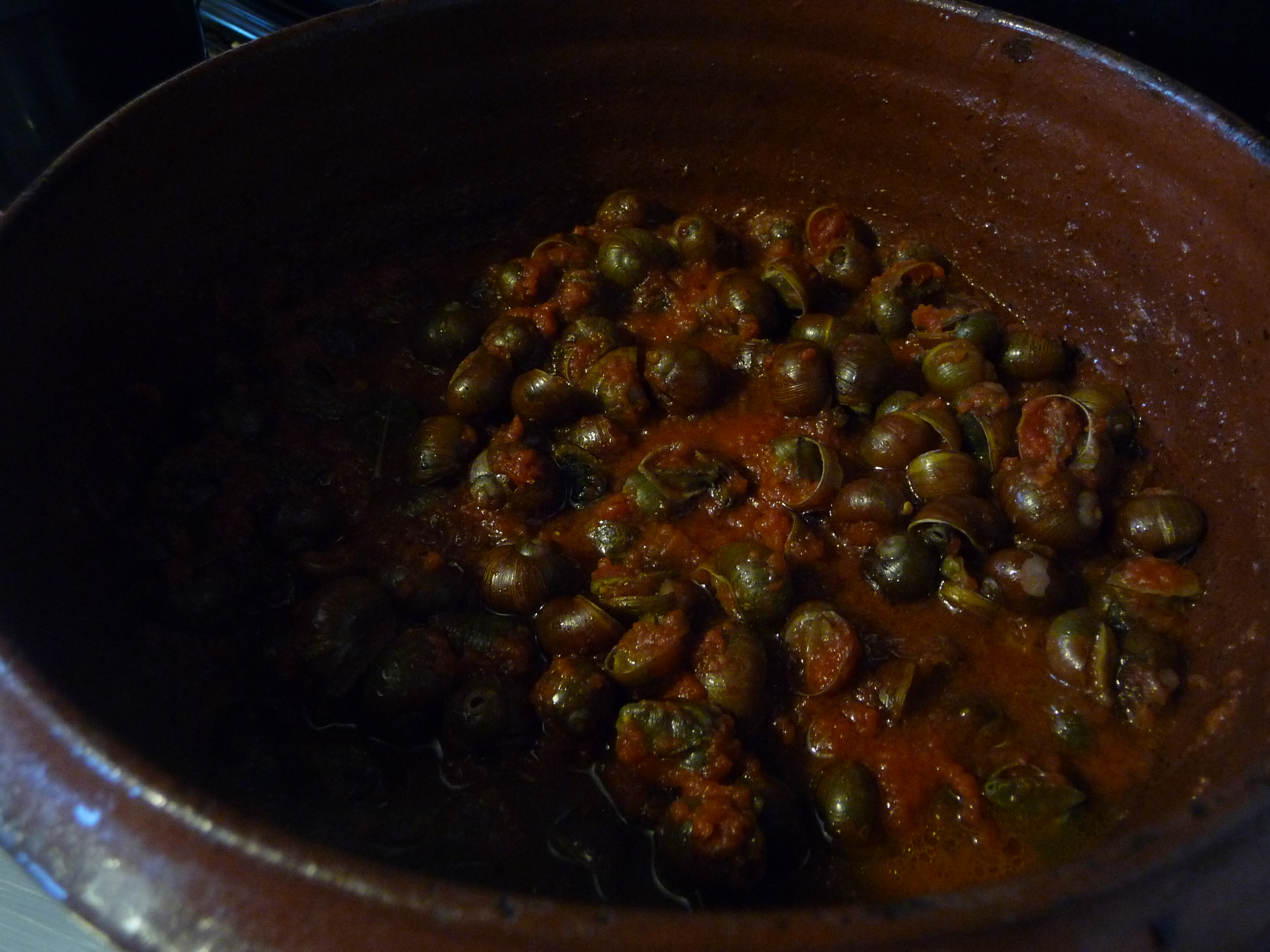
snail's gravy

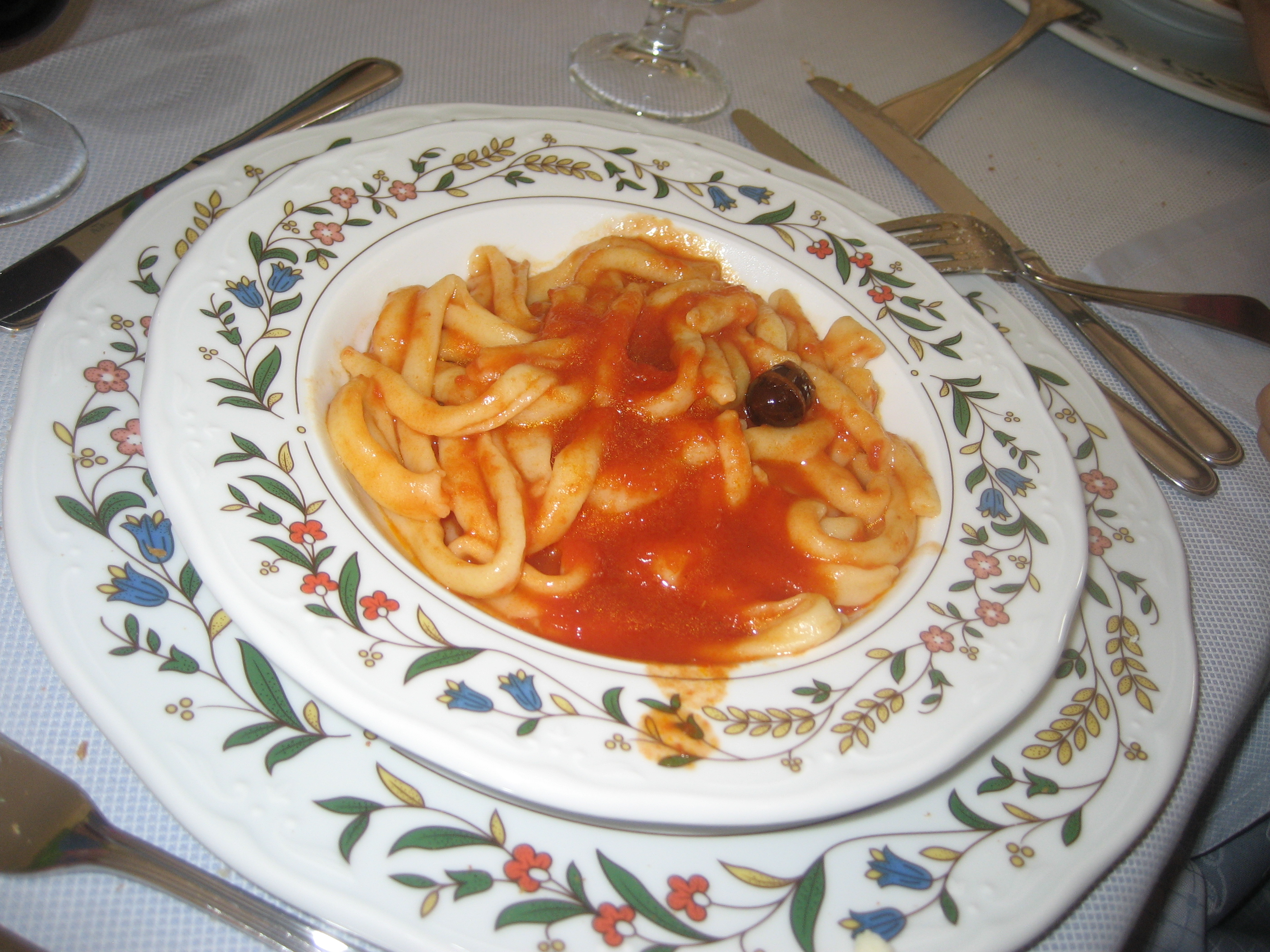
pasta made at home with olives
