= Pazzano =

- Comune
- Comune di Pazzano
- Panorama of Pazzano

- Coat of arms

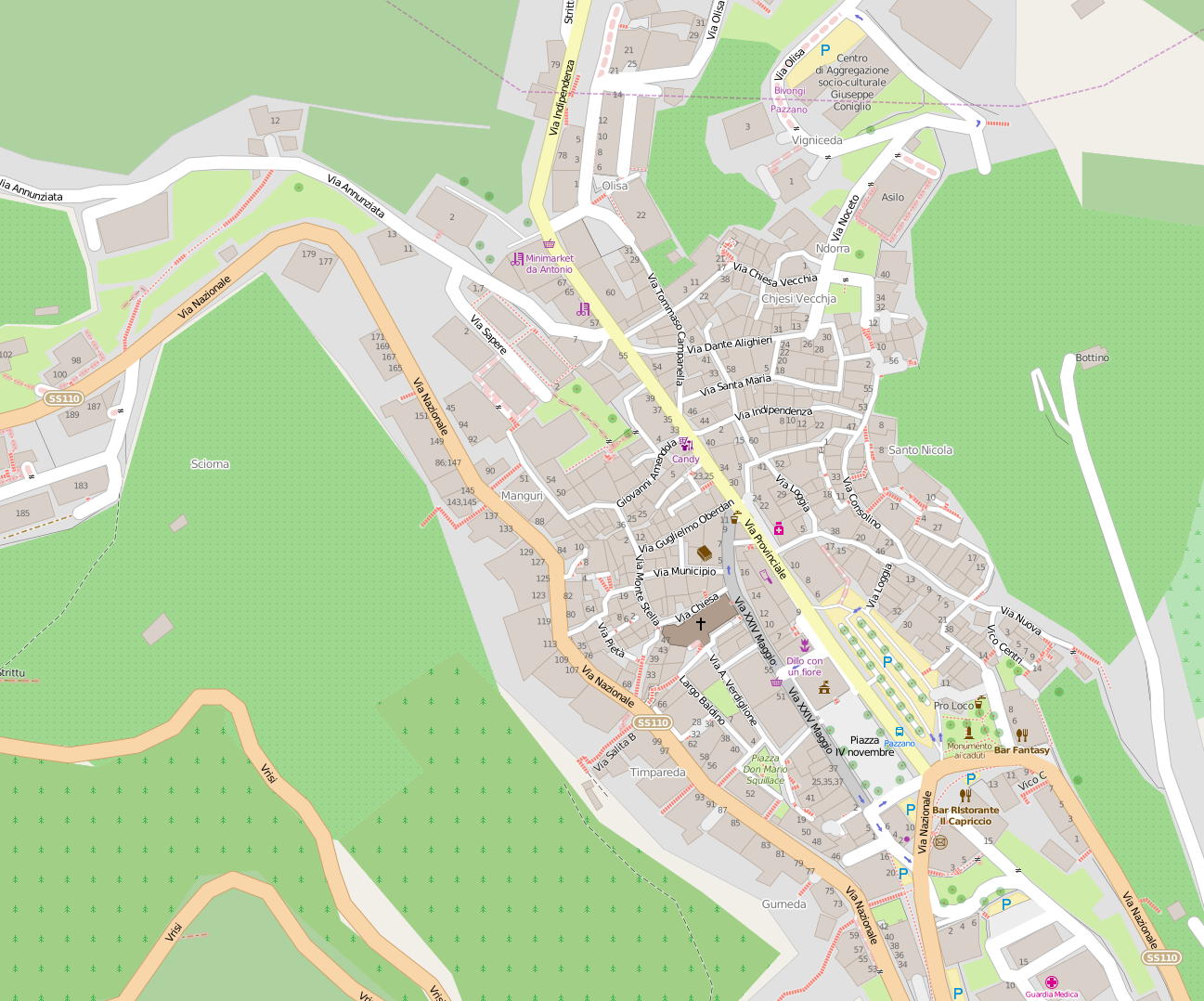
- Pazzano, urban area

- Location within Italy Location within Calabria
- Coordinates: 38°29′N 16°27′E
- Country: Italy
- Region: Calabria
- Metropolitan city: Reggio Calabria (RC)

Government
  - Mayor: Alessandro Taverniti

Area
  - Total: 15.57 km^{2} (6.01 sq mi)
- Elevation: 460 m (1,510 ft)

Population (31 December 2017)
  - Total: 529
  - Density: 34.0/km^{2} (88.0/sq mi)
- Demonym: Pazzanesi
- Time zone: UTC+1 (CET)
  - Summer (DST): UTC+2 (CEST)
- Postal code: 89040
- Dialing code: 0964
- Patron saint: Saint Joseph
- Saint day: 19 March
- Website: Official website

Pazzano (Calabrian: Pazzanu) is a village and comune located in Locride's region in the province of Reggio Calabria (Calabria, southern Italy).

== History ==
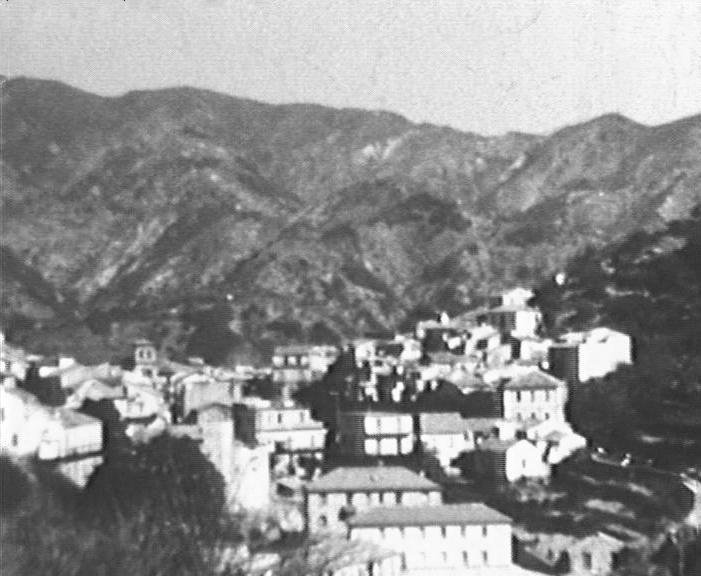
Pazzano in 1965.

The first known mention of Pazzano dates to a 1094 document. The town was founded as a minerary center for the exploitation of iron (by pyrite and limonite) and molybdenum (the latter in caves of Monte Stella and Monte Consolino) deposits. During the period of the Kingdom of the Two Sicilies, its 25 mines made Pazzano the most important mining centre in all of southern Italy. The minerals were processed at Reali ferriere ed Officine di Mongiana in Mongiana.

Pazzano became a comune in 1811. Minerary activities lasted until the 20th century. During the 1950s, the inhabitants began to emigrate to northern Italy, and Pazzano's population drastically reduced.

At Sydney,(Australia), since the 1950s, the emigrants of Pazzano created a little community in Brookvale (nicknamed Pazzaniedu) and at Narraweena, every year, the Santo Salvatore's fiest.

There is also a little community at Aliquippa in Pennsylvania (USA).

By the 1980s the ecomuseum Ecomuseo delle ferriere e fonderie di Calabria (Ecomuseum of iron-foundry and foundry of Calabria) was to preserve and remember the industrial archaeology of the town.

== Main sights ==
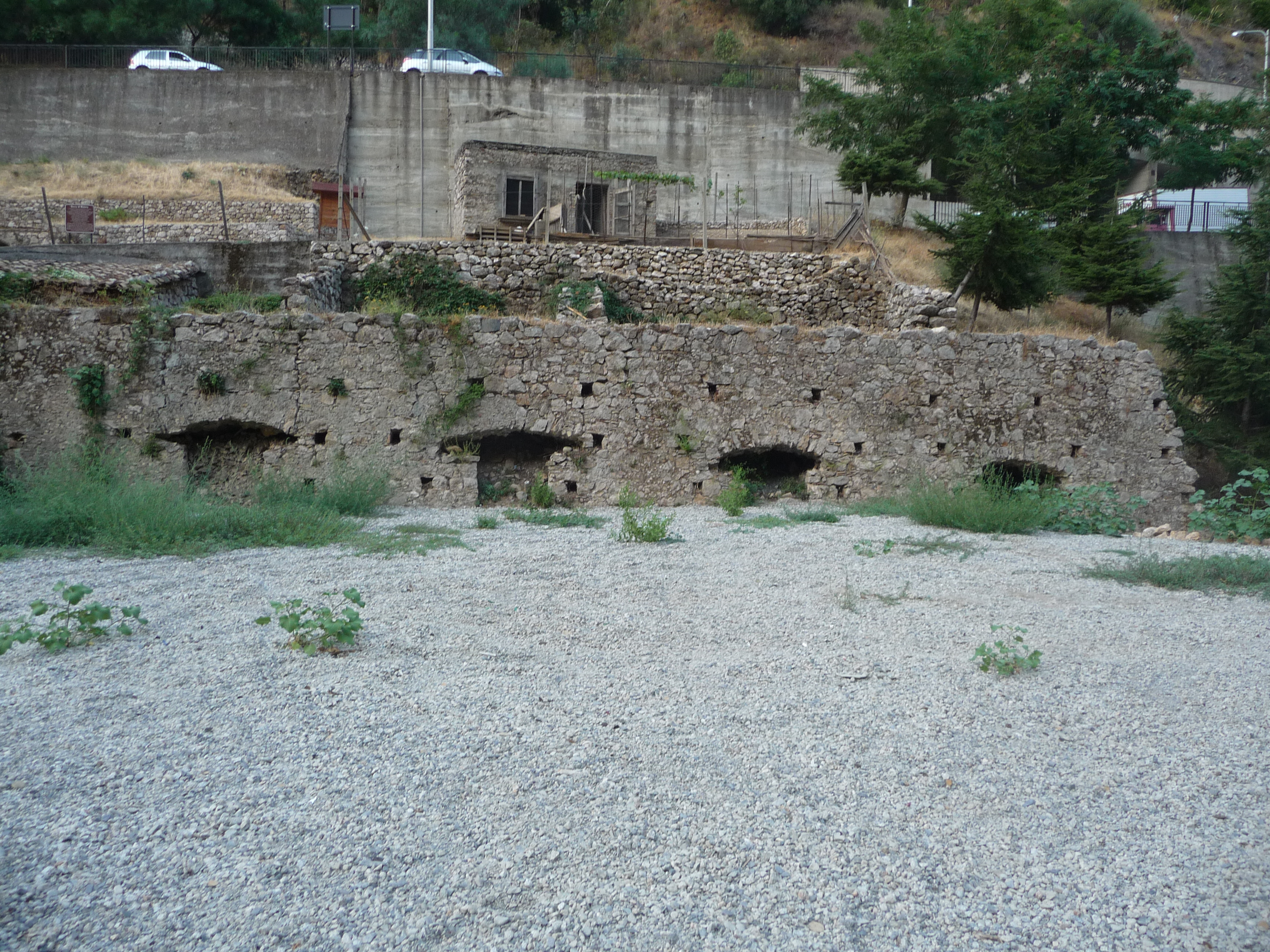
Mines blocked entrance

- Chiesa di Santa Maria Assunta in Cielo (Santa Maria's church)
- Santuario di Monte Stella (Monte Stella's Sanctuary)
- The 25 old iron mines of Borbonic period, now closed:
- Principe Ereditario (Settecento)
- Carolina (Settecento)
- S. Ferdinando (Settecento)
- Regina
- Noceto
- Scolo
- Galleria Italia
- Galleria Piave
- Galleria Acqua Calda
- Contrì
- San Giuseppe
- R. Principe
- Colle di Banno
- Lucarello
- S. Maria
- Perrone
- Gotto
- perronello
- Clementina
- Clementina II
- San Carlo
- San Nicola
- Campoli
- Garibaldi
- San Luigi
- Grotta Nuova
- Provvisoria
- Regina ribasso
- Melichicchi
- Umberto I
- Fontana Vecchia or Fontana dei minatori (Old Fountain or Miner's Fountain)

== People ==
- Giuseppe Coniglio (2 December 1922 – 13 March 2006), poet. He wrote Calabria contadina (poetry, 1973), Quattru chjacchjari e ddui arrisi (poetry, 1984), A terra mia (poetry, 1998) and Marcu e Filomena (theatrical comedy)

== Economy ==
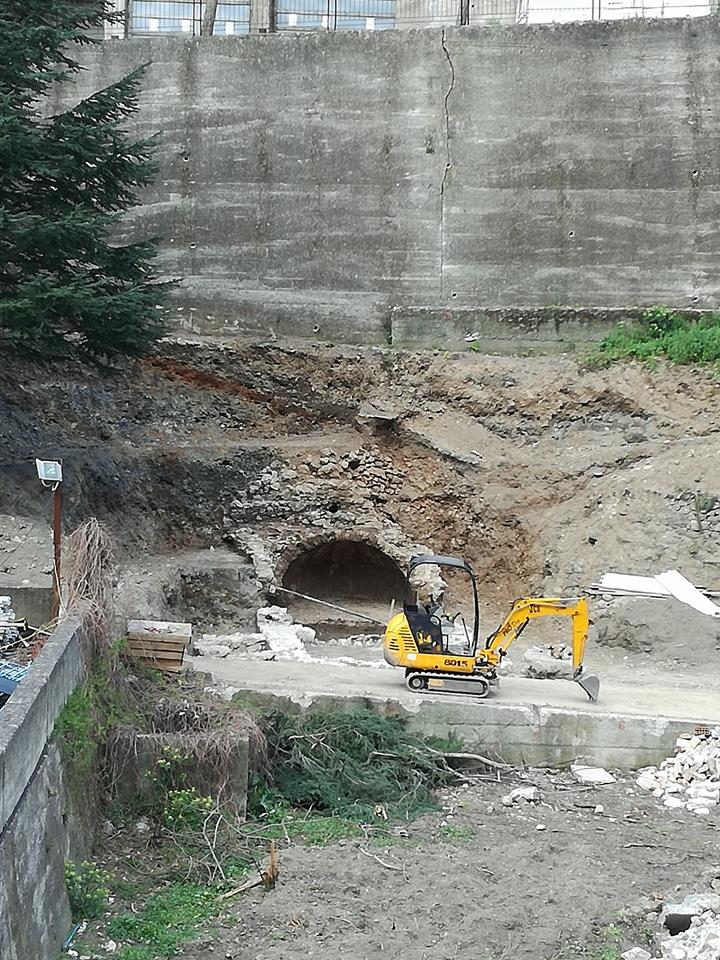
Beginning of works for retrieving of an alleged Byzantine ruin (17 March 2017)

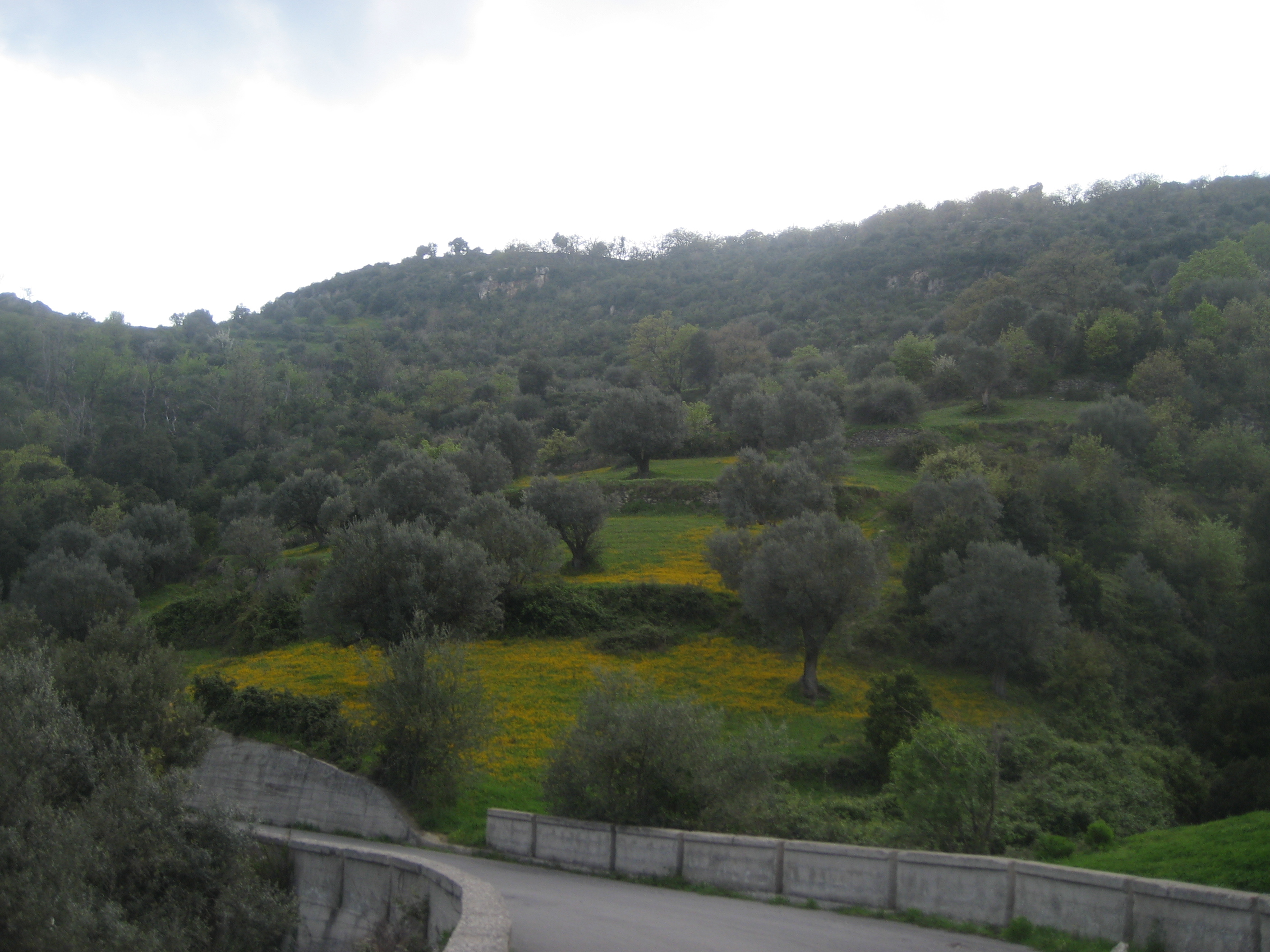
olive grove

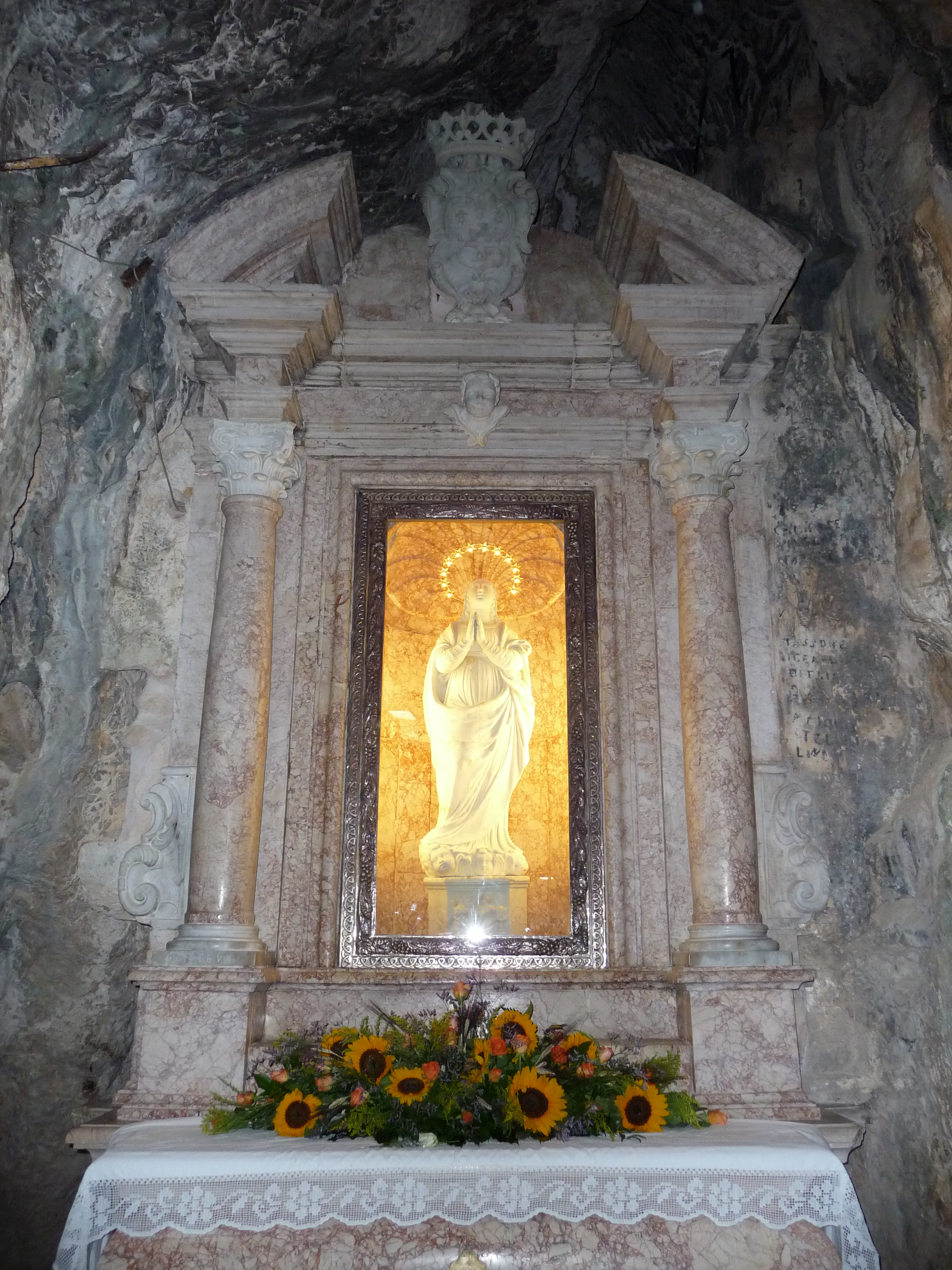
Madonna della stella Statue

In the past, Pazzano had an industrial activity related with Reali Ferriere di Mongiana, people who worked in the field in spring and summer period on winter worked in the iron mines. The subsistence agriculture produced olive oil, wine, grain, cheese, vegetables like eggplants, tomatoes, chicory, zucchini, beans, chickpeas, fruit like oranges, figs, and pears. There were also limestone quarries, hydraulic mills, and a homemade of dress production.

The 1960s was also the period when emigration to Italian northern cities occurred, and year by year numerous economic activities closed.

The economy of Pazzano now is largely based on agriculture: olive oil production, fruit harvesting, and religious tourism. In the early 21st century, there have been some attempts in Vallata dello Stilaro and Serre calabresi to increase natural tourism with the creation of the near Parco naturale regionale delle Serre (Serre's park) and archaeological industrial tourism with the ecomuseum creation of Ecomuseo delle ferriere e fonderie di Calabria and the building of Museo della cultura mineraria (mine culture museum) in Pazzano.

== Transportation ==
Pazzano is located on the SS 110 state road, 15 kilometres (9 mi) from the coastal town of Monasterace Marina.

There is a bus service, Federico, that links Pazzano with Reggio Calabria and several other towns including Stilo, Caulonia, Gioiosa Ionica and Locri. The nearest railway station is Monasterace Marina (15 km).

A cumprunta (2000)

== Food ==
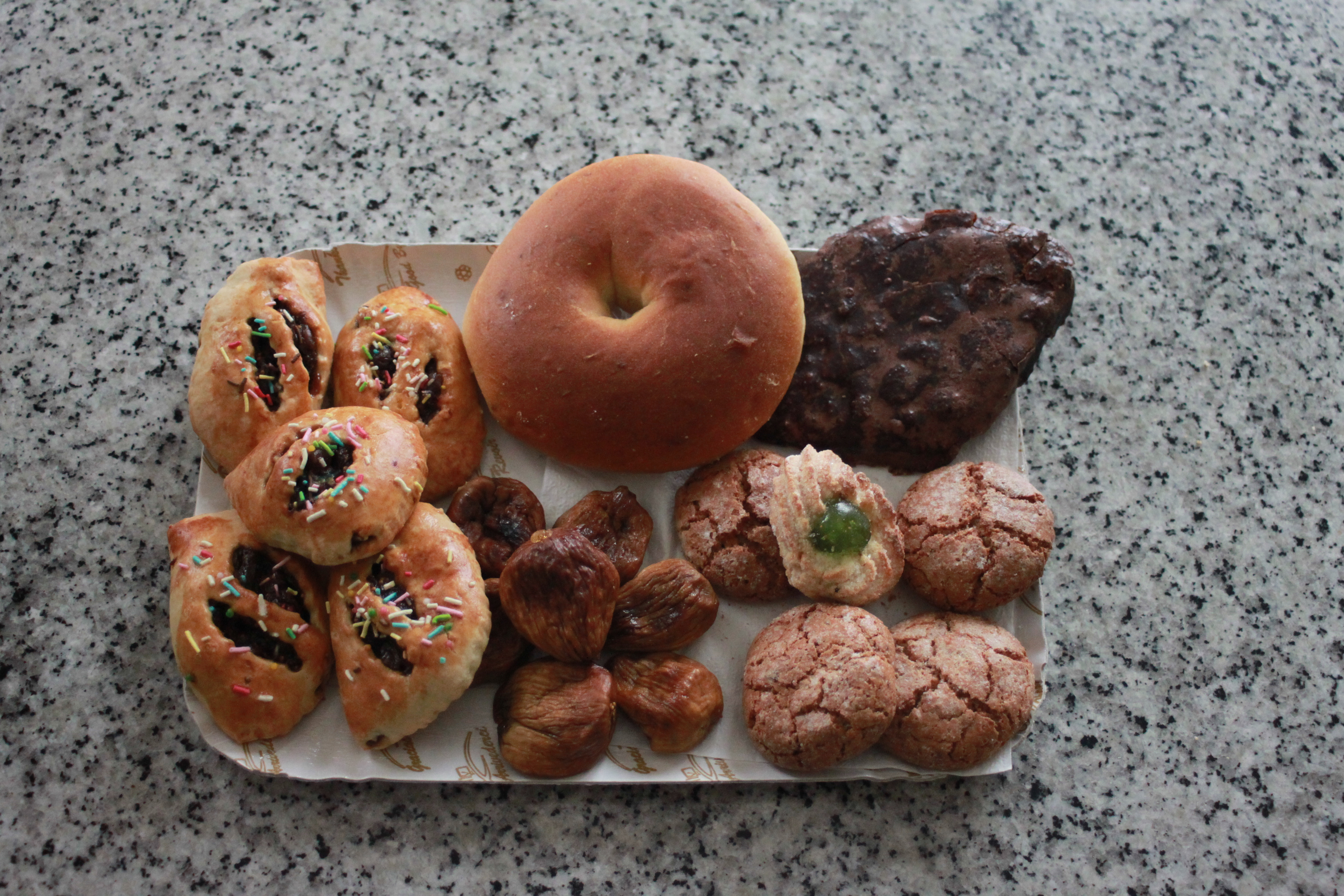
Sweets in Stilaro valley

Pazzano's food is typical of Calabria, and includes:

- Pasta e casa (Home made pasta).
- Ragù cooked with goat meat.
- Tripe ('trippa') and potatoes
- Melanzane ('malangiani') ripiene (stuffed aubergine/egg-plant)
- 'Pipi Chini' (stuffed capsicum)
- Zippuli
- Pitta di San Martino, San Martino's day (11 November) typical sweet
- cuzzupe, Easter typical sweet

== See also ==
- Vallata dello Stilaro
- Ecomuseo delle ferriere e fonderie di Calabria
- Andata e ritorno
- Monte Consolino
- Monte Mammicomito
- Monte Stella (Calabria)
- Eremo di Santa Maria della Stella
