= Monte Consolino =

Mountain in Italy

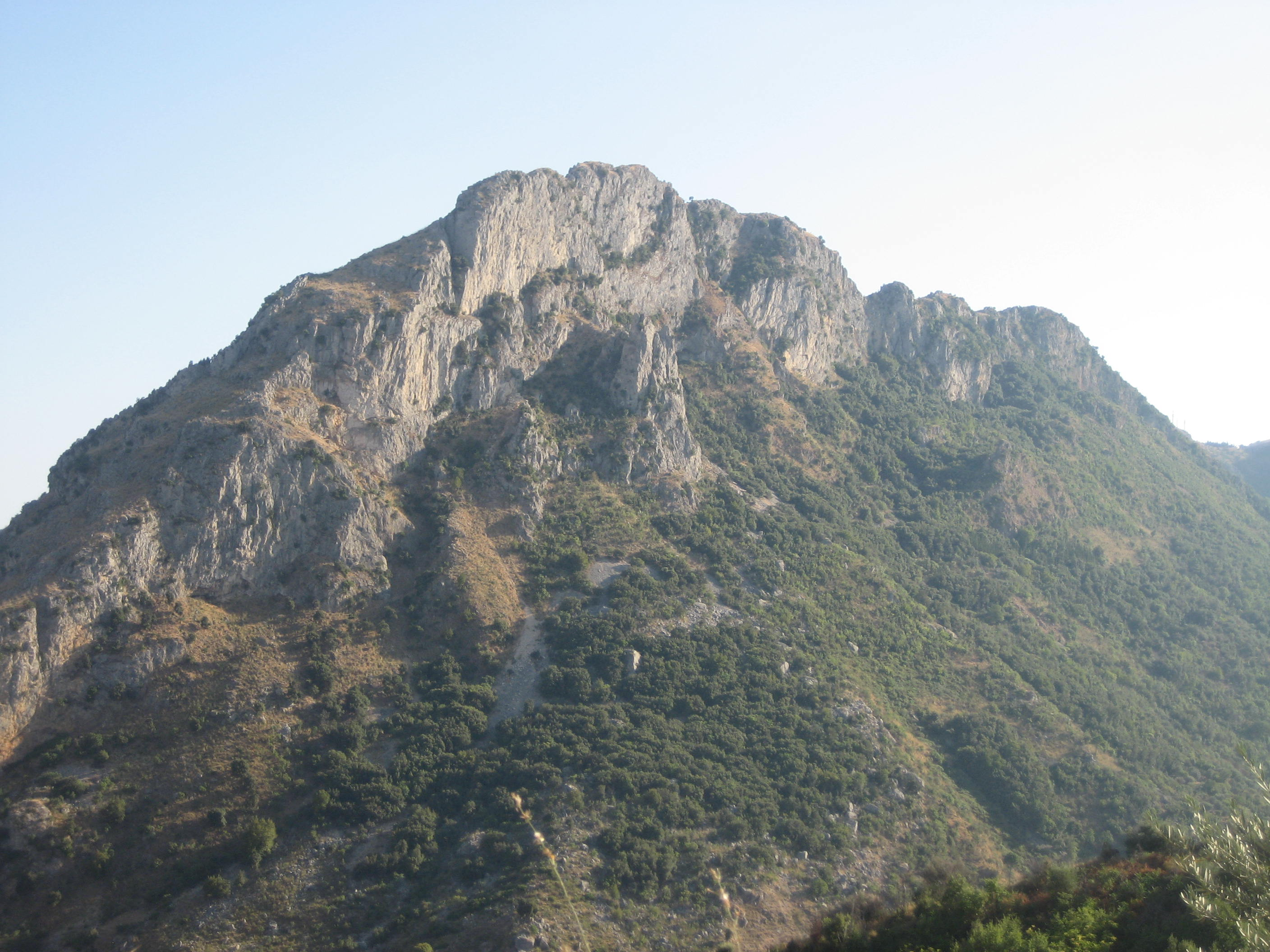
- Monte Consolino seen from Bivongi.

Highest point
- Elevation: 701 m (2,300 ft)
- Coordinates: 38°28′52″N 16°27′52″E

Geography
- Location within Italy
- Location: Calabria, Italy
- Parent range: Serre Calabresi

Monte Consolino is a peak in the Serre Calabresi mountain range, located in the Vallata dello Stilaro of south-western Calabria, southern Italy. Monte Consolino has an altitude of 701 metres (2,300 ft).

At the foot of Monte Consolino is the town of Stilo. The towns of Pazzano and Bivongi is located nearby, between Monte Consolino and Monte Stella. Located nearby and separated from the Monte Mammicomito by a narrow valley, is the town of Pazzano.

== History ==
On the mountain's top are the stone ruins of the Norman castle built by Roger II of Sicily (1095–1154). Just below the Norman Castle is the ruins of the 'so-called' Byzantine kastrum.

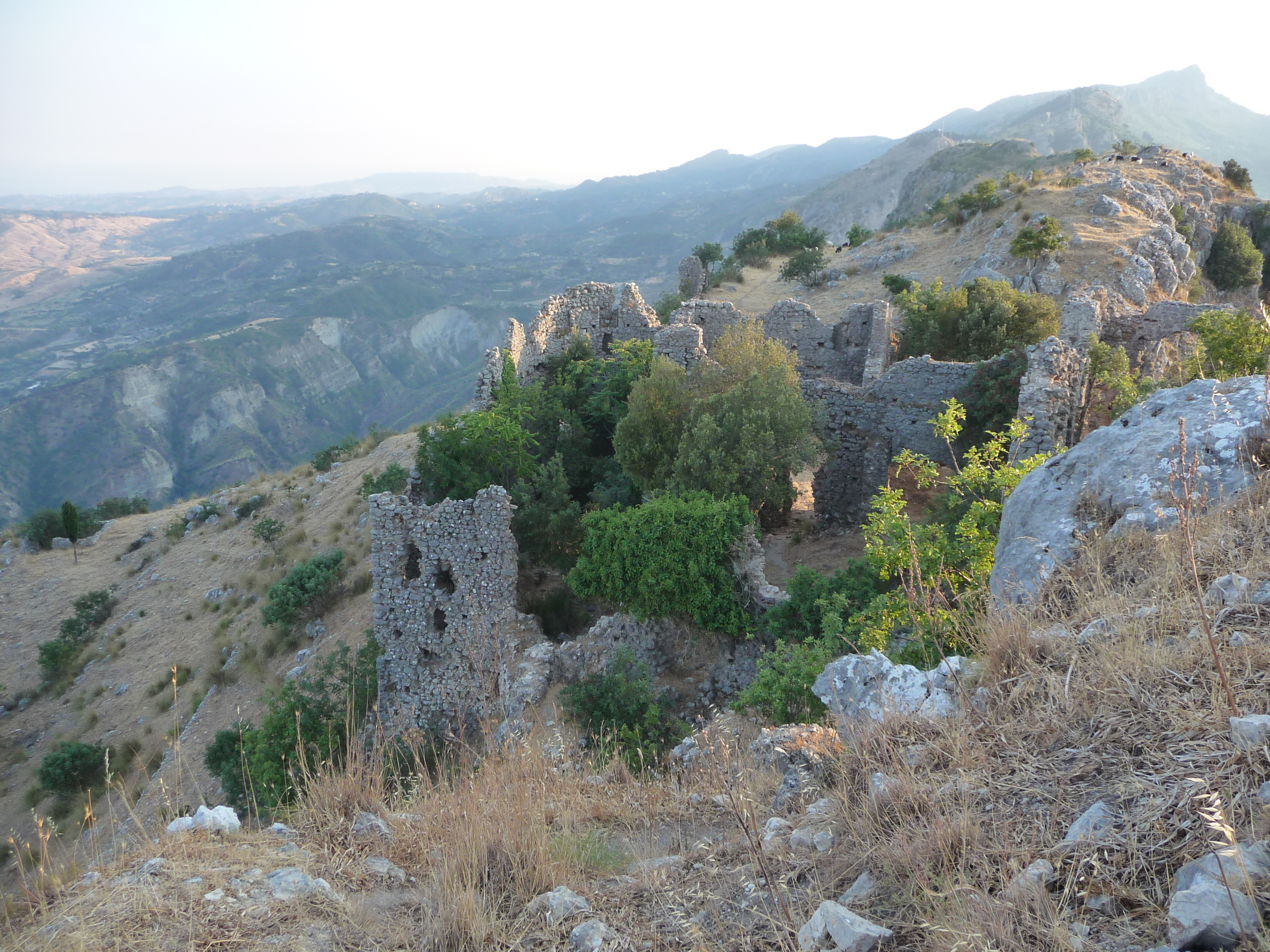
Landscape at the top of Monte Consolino, with the Norman Castle ruins.

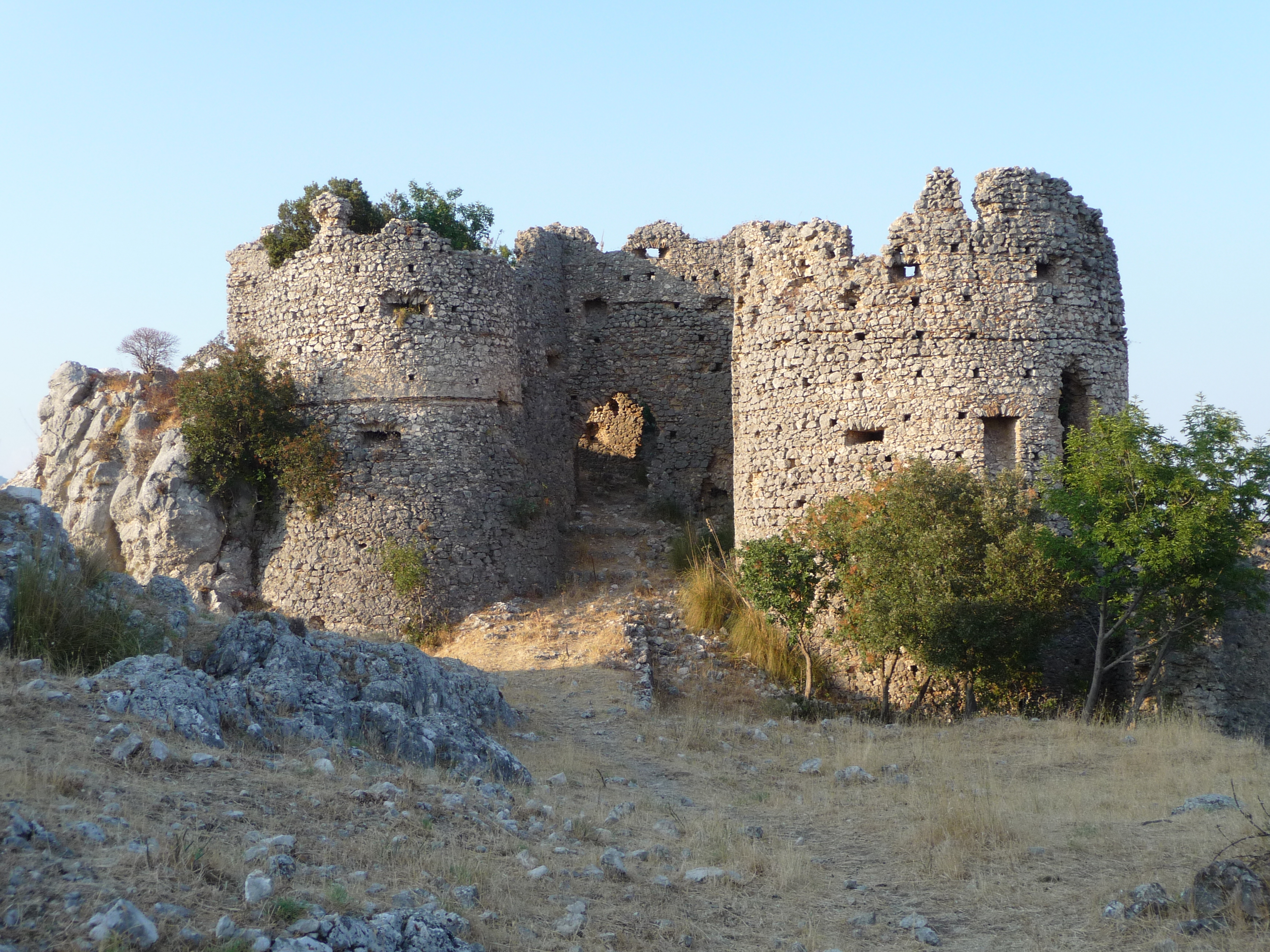
Stone walls of the Norman Castle, built by Roger II of Sicily.

== Sources ==
- Blanchard, Paul (2007). Southern Italy. London: Somerset Books. ISBN 978-1-905131-18-1.
