= Giuseppe Coniglio =

Italian poet (1922–2006)

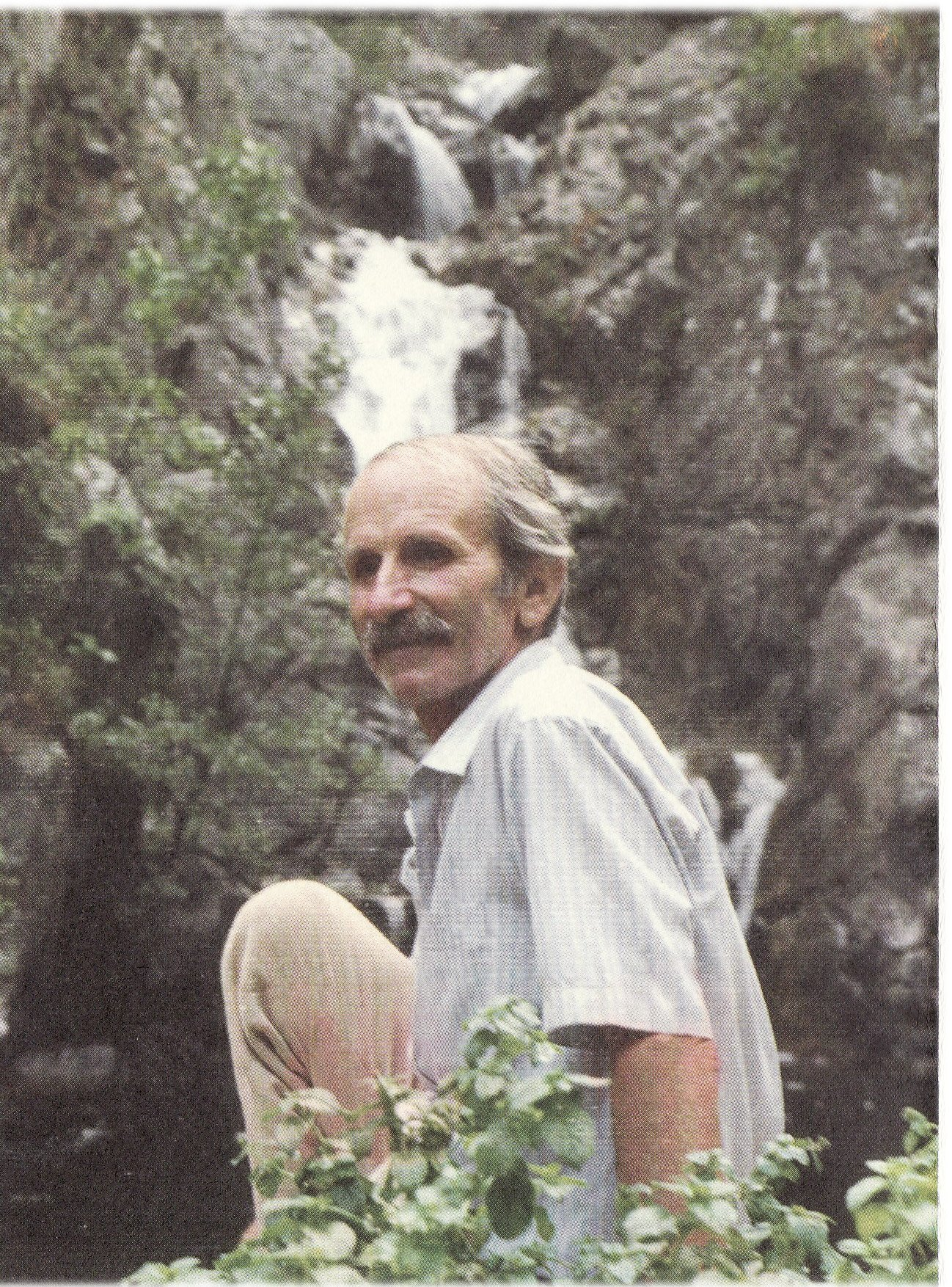
Giuseppe Coniglio

Giuseppe Coniglio, known as U poeta, (December 2, 1922 in Pazzano (RC) – March 13, 2006 in Catanzaro), was an Italian poet who wrote in Pazzanese, a variety of the Calabrian dialect (language).

== Life ==
Giuseppe Coniglio, born on 2 December 1922 in a family of poor farmers, lived all his life in Pazzano (province of Reggio Calabria, Italy). He married Letizia Bosco with whom he had two children: Palmiro and Maria Antonietta. He worked first as a farm hand and then as capo operaio forestale (chief forester) in "Bacino Montano Stilaro".

After the Second World War, Coniglio wrote his first carnival farces in pazzanito dialect (a local variant of the Calabrian language). The most famous of these farces was "La calata degli dei" (The Fall of the Gods), written in 1949. He produced his first poetry collection in 1973 under the title "Calabria contadina" (The Calabria of the Farmers), which appeared in 1984 in a second edition. In that same year, he published Quattru chjacchjari e ddui arrisi (Some Chatting and Some Laughs). His last volume of poetry was A terra mia (My land) in 1998.

Coniglio also produced a large number of wood and stone sculptures; of these, "La fontana dei Mascheroni" is considered the most famous.

For the theatre Coniglio wrote the comedy Marcu e Filomena as well as a new rendition of Natale in casa Cupiello (a very famous play by Eduardo De Filippo) in the Pazzanese dialect.

In August 2007 the social-cultural center of Pazzano (Centro di aggregazione socio-culturale) was dedicated to him.

== Works ==
- Calabria contadina (poetry collection, 1973)
- Quattru chjacchjari e ddui arrisi (poetry collection, 1984)
- A terra mia (poetry collection, 1998)
- Marcu e Filomena (comedy for the theatre)

== Awards ==
- 1° award "Lauro d'Argento" Edizione sagra della poesia calabrese. Ardore Marina, 1983.
- 1° award trofeo Salvatore Filocamo 6° edizione Estate locridea with the poetry "U cozzali" – Mammola, 1986
- 1° award "Nuove prospettive Calabresi" – S. Calogero 1987
- 1° award "Concorso nazionale Pro-Moschetta" with the poetry "A guttera" – Moschetta di Locri, 1990.
- 1° award "Concorso poesia dialettale nella Locride" Roccella Jonica 1990
- 1° literary award "Sant'Andrea" with poetry "A terra mia" – Sant'Andrea Apostolo dello Ionio, 1996.
- 1° award "Accademia del dialetto di Grifo" Trofeo Mimmo Martino "una vita per la poesia" Reggio Calabria 1996

== See also ==
- Pazzano
- Calabrian dialect
