= Monte Mammicomito =

Mountain in Italy

Coordinates: 38°27′35″N 16°25′25″E

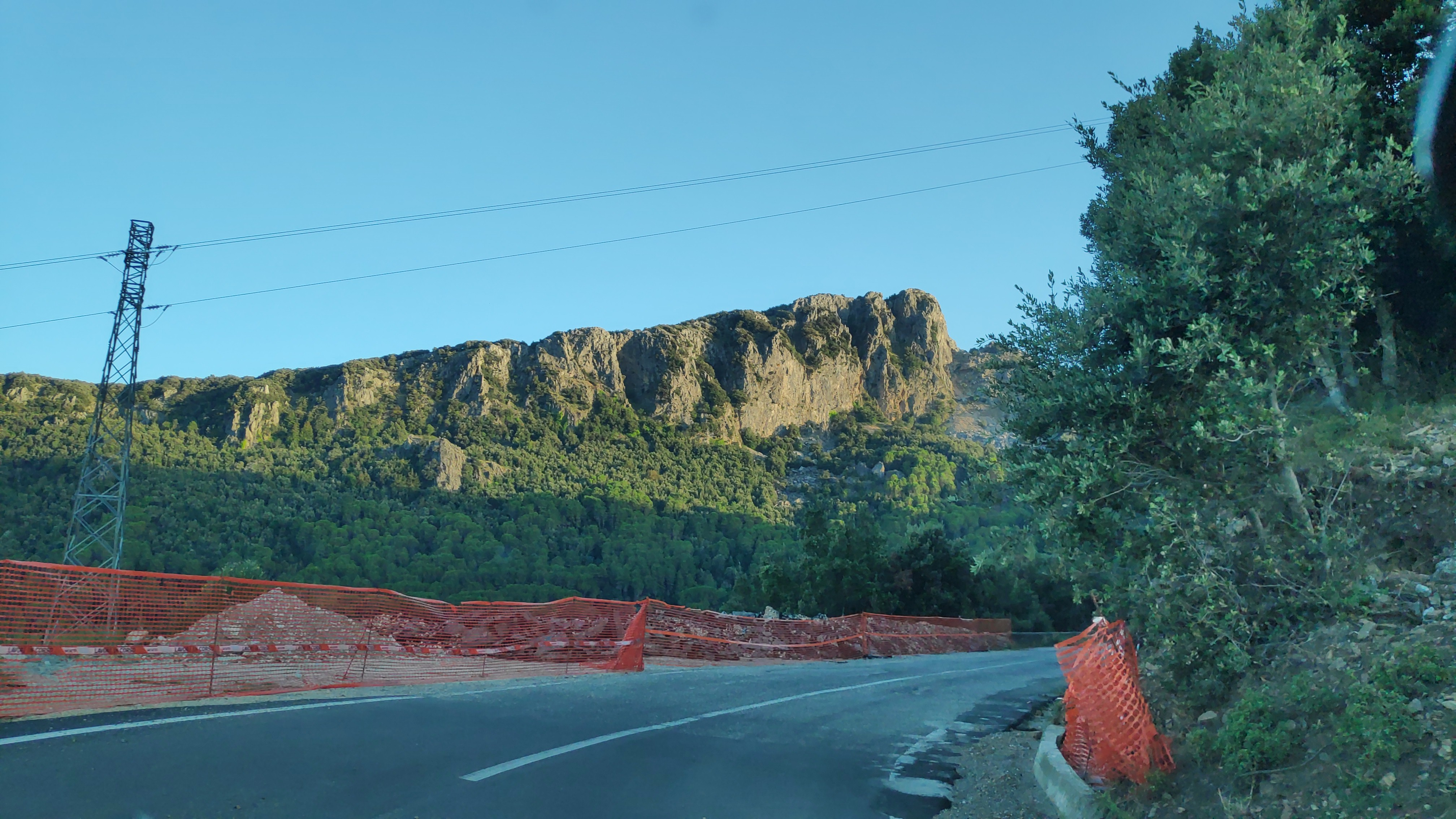
- Monte Mammicomito (2020)

Highest point
- Elevation: 1,047 m (3,435 ft)

Geography
- Location within Italy
- Location: Calabria, Italy
- Parent range: Apennines

Monte Mammicomito is a massif in the Serre Calabresi, southern Calabria, southern Italy. It is composed of Devonian-origin limestone.

Monte Mammicomito is separated from Monte Consolino by a narrow valley, in which is the town of Pazzano.

== Sources ==
Media related to Monte Mammicomito at Wikimedia Commons

- Bevilacqua, Francesco (2002). Il parco delle Serre. Rubbettino.
