= Bivongi =

- Comune
- Comune di Bivongi
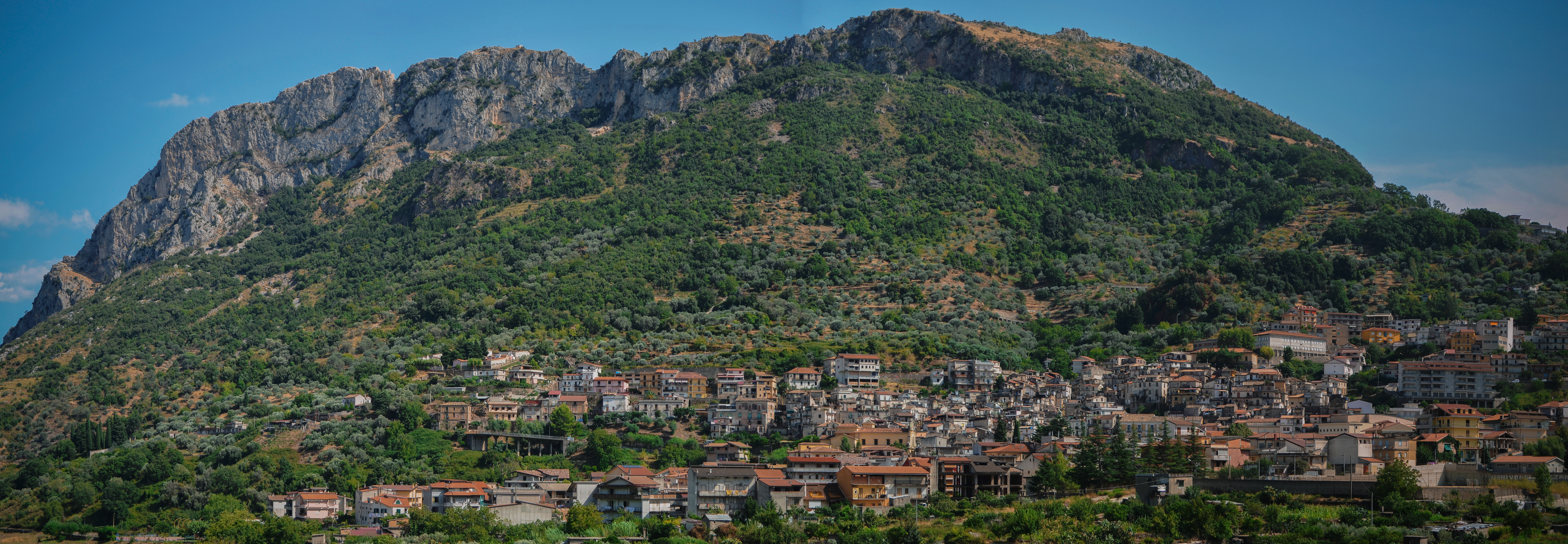

- Coat of arms

- Location within Italy Location within Calabria
- Coordinates: 38°29′N 16°27′E
- Country: Italy
- Region: Calabria
- Metropolitan city: Reggio Calabria (RC)
- Frazioni: Melodari, Condoianni

Government
  - Mayor: Grazia Zaffino

Area
  - Total: 25.3 km^{2} (9.8 sq mi)
- Elevation: 270 m (890 ft)

Population (December 2007)
  - Total: 1,490
  - Density: 58.9/km^{2} (153/sq mi)
- Demonym: Bivongesi
- Time zone: UTC+1 (CET)
  - Summer (DST): UTC+2 (CEST)
- Postal code: 89040
- Dialing code: 0964

Bivongi (Calabrian: Bivungi or Bigungi) is a comune (municipality) in the Province of Reggio Calabria in the Italian region Calabria, located about 50 kilometres (31 mi) southwest of Catanzaro and about 80 kilometres (50 mi) northeast of Reggio Calabria in the Stilaro Valley, at the feet of the Monte Consolino.

Attractions include the Cascata del Marmarico, a 114-metre (374 ft) high waterfall, and the Monastery of San Giovanni Theristis.

== Sister city ==
- La Plata (Argentina) 2012

== See also ==
- Calabrian wine
- Vallata dello Stilaro Allaro
- Ecomuseo delle ferriere e fonderie di Calabria
