= Andata e ritorno =

1985 film

- Directed by: Daniele Segre
- Starring: Carlo Cuteri
- Release date: 1985
- Running time: 60 minutes
- Country: Italy
- Languages: Italian and calabrian dialect

Andata e ritorno ('Round trip') is a 1985 documentary film produced and directed by Daniele Segre. It is located in Pazzano, a small town in the province of Reggio Calabria, and was shot between November 1 and November 4, 1985. Dialogues are in part in pazzanese dialect with Italian subtitles, and in part in Italian.

== Broadcast ==
The film was broadcast by TV on Raidue in June 1985. It was also shown at the Museo Diffuso della Resistenza della Deportazione, della Guerra, dei Diritti e della Libertà in Turin in April 2008.

== Content ==
The film focuses on Carlo Cuteri, a Calabrian boy who comes back to his Pazzano home town. The documentary deals with the issues of work-related emigration and uses Pazzano as a symbol for general problems in Southern Italy.

== Reception ==
Claudio Stillitano, in an article on Oggisud in 1985, explored the debate created by the local reception of the film. Film maker Daniele Segre was accused of giving an unfairly dark image of Pazzano; to which he replied that his purpose had been to expose the problems of the South through Pazzano.
