= Castle of Stilo =

Castle in Stilo, Calabria, Italy

- Stilo, Italy
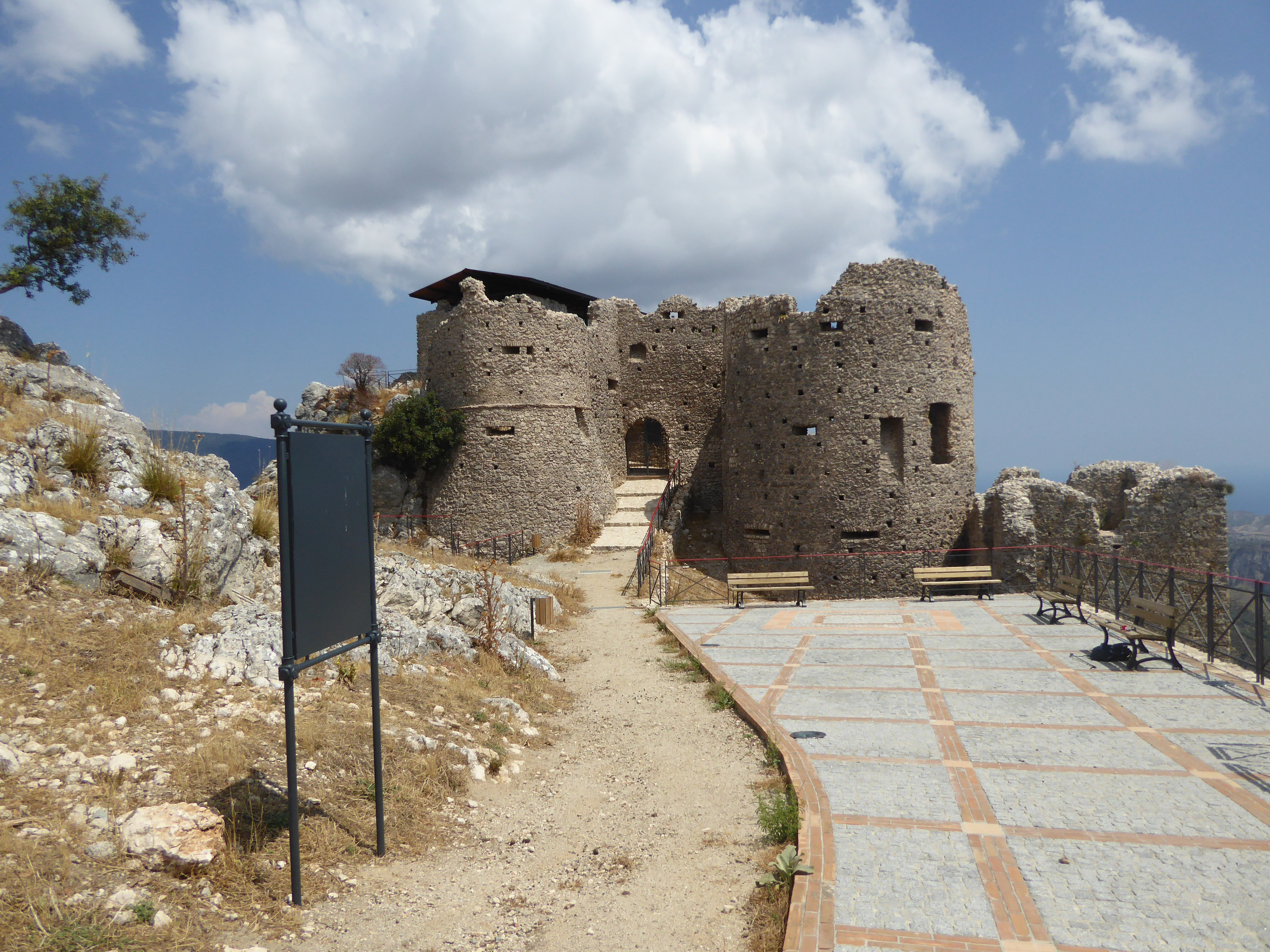
- Castle of Stilo (August 2013)

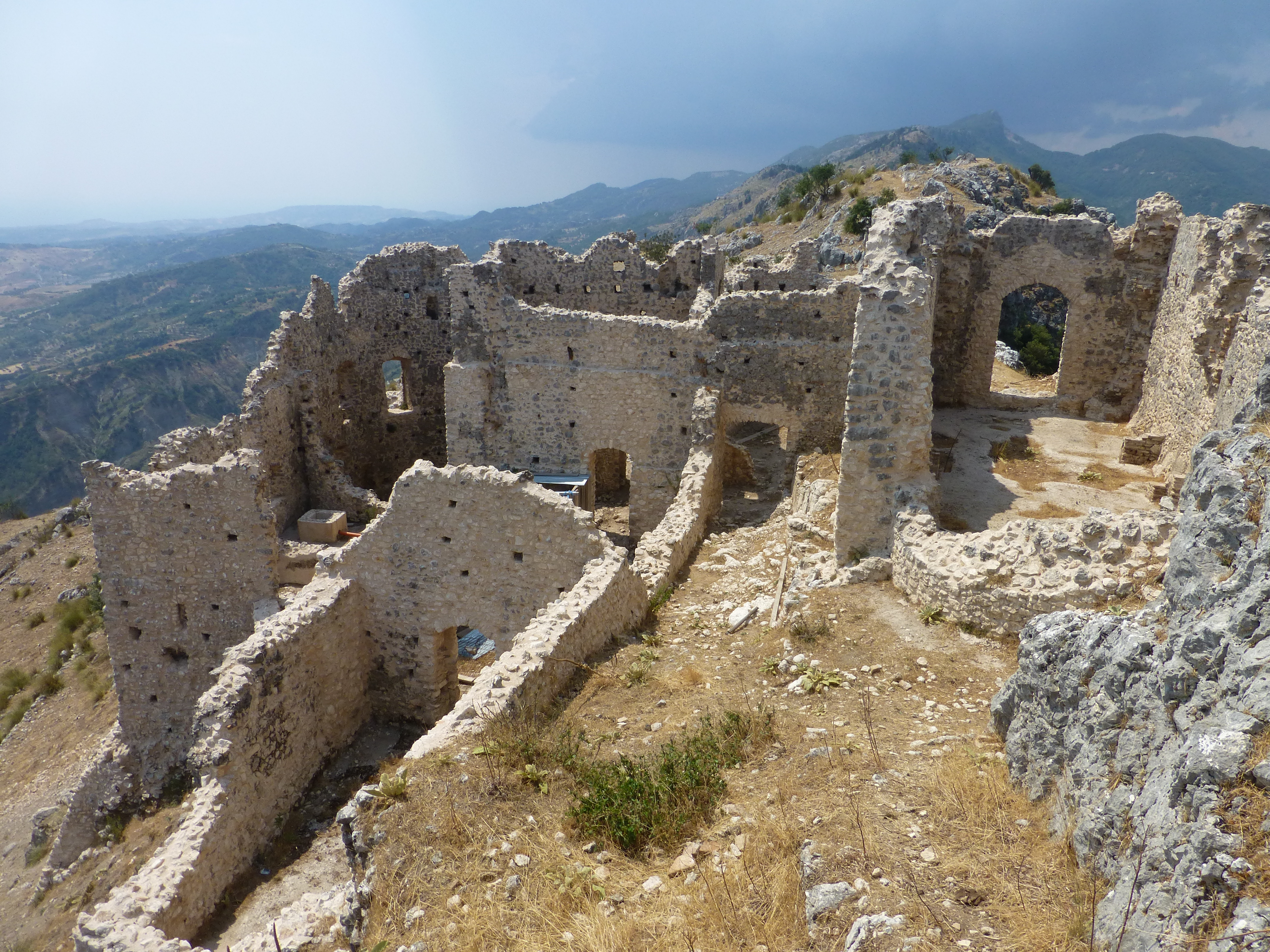
- Interior view of the castle (August 2013)

Site information
- Type: Castle
- Condition: Under restoration since 2009

Location
- Coordinates: 38°28′50″N 16°27′51″E

Site history
- Built: 11th century
- Built by: Roger I of Sicily

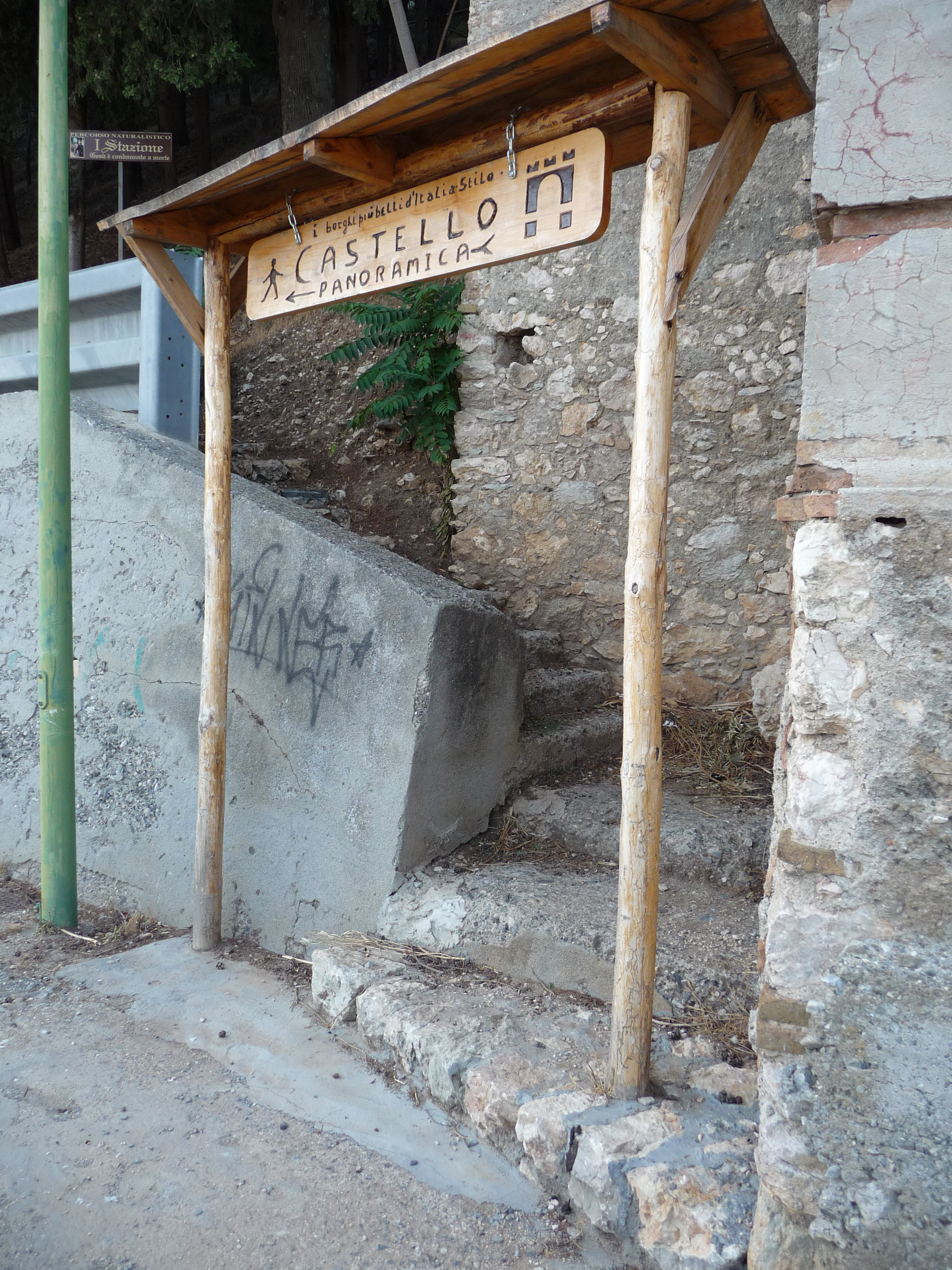
Starting point of the panoramic path

The Castle of Stilo, also known as the Norman Castle, is a medieval fortress located in Stilo, Calabria, southern Italy. Built in the 11th century by Roger I of Sicily, it stands on Monte Consolino and offers panoramic views of the surrounding area.

== History ==
The first recorded mention of the Norman castle at Stilo dates to 7 May 1093, in a concession act by Count Roger to Saint Bruno: *"elegerunt itaque quondam solitudinis locum inter locum qui dicitur Arena et oppidum quod appelatur Stilum".*

In the 13th century, it was among seventeen castles in Calabria administered by the Reale Curia under Charles I of Naples. During this period, the castle was also used as a prison and underwent maintenance, as recorded in folio 233 of 1281 from the Regia Zecca Archive.

On 14 April 1323, records show the Duke of Calabria, son of King Robert, granted the "Castellania of Stilo" (stewardship of the castle) to Noble Marco, Contestabile and Baron of Settingiano, to him and his descendants.

Since 2009, the castle has been undergoing restoration efforts.

== Access ==
The castle can be reached via two main paths:

- The steep and panoramic trail beginning near the Cattolica church, which includes Stilo’s Via Crucis path with fourteen stations and three rest areas featuring benches and scenic viewpoints.
- A wider, less steep path starting near Stilo Cemetery.

== Legend ==
Local folklore tells of a ghostly drumming sound emanating from the castle. According to legend, a drummer boy was sent into a secret passage beneath the castle, beating his drum so others could follow. Partway through, the drumming abruptly stopped, and the boy vanished without a trace.
