= Stilo =

Stilo Greek: Στύλος, romanized: Stylos
- Comune
- Comune di Stilo
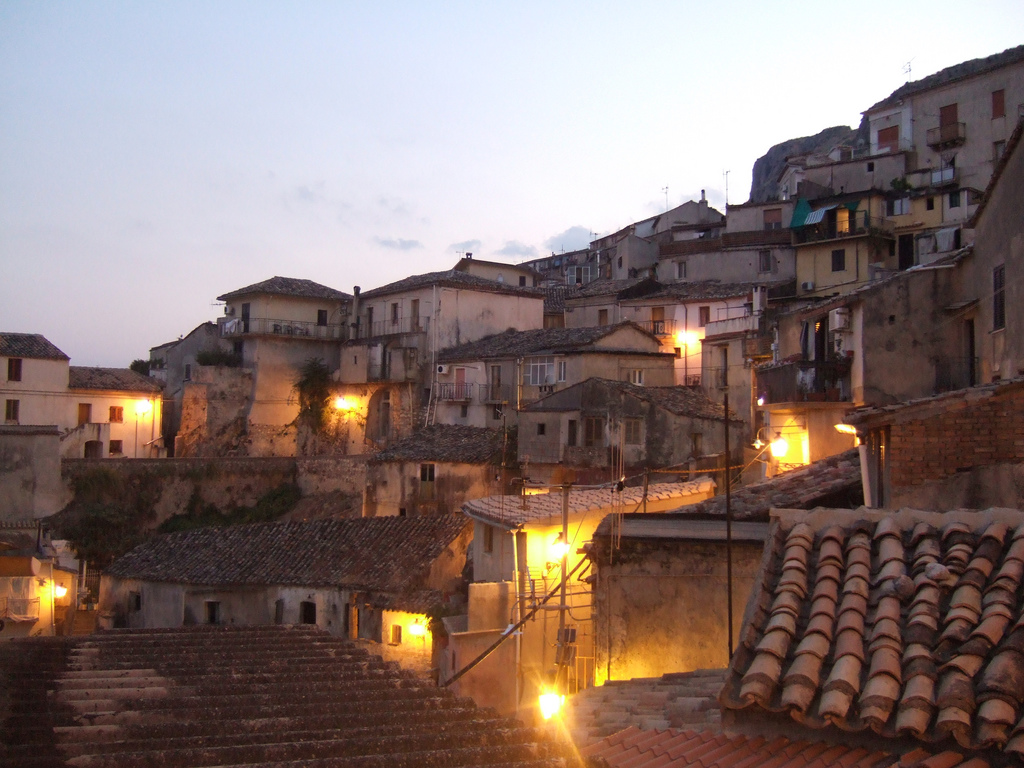

- Coat of arms

- Location within Italy Location within Calabria
- Coordinates: 38°29′N 16°28′E
- Country: Italy
- Region: Calabria
- Metropolitan city: Reggio Calabria (RC)
- Frazioni: Caldarella, Bordingiano, Gatticello, Ferdinandea, Mila

Government
  - Mayor: Giancarlo Miriello (since May 31, 2006)

Area
  - Total: 78.49 km^{2} (30.31 sq mi)
- Elevation: 386 m (1,266 ft)

Population (December 2007)
  - Total: 2,742
  - Density: 34.93/km^{2} (90.48/sq mi)
- Demonym: Stilesi
- Time zone: UTC+1 (CET)
  - Summer (DST): UTC+2 (CEST)
- Postal code: 89049
- Dialing code: 0964
- Patron saint: St. George
- Saint day: April 23
- Website: Official website

Stilo (Calabrian: Stilu; Greek: Στύλος, romanized: Stylos, lit. 'column') is a town and comune in the province of Reggio Calabria, in the Calabria region of southern Italy. It is 151 kilometres (94 mi) from Reggio.

It is one of I Borghi più belli d'Italia ("The most beautiful villages of Italy").

The economy of the commune is mainly based on agriculture, with production of cereals, oil, wine and cheese. There are mines of iron and lead.

At 10 kilometres (6 mi) from the city is the promontory of Cape Stilo, near where in July 1940 the Battle of Punta Stilo was fought by the Italian and British navies.

== History ==
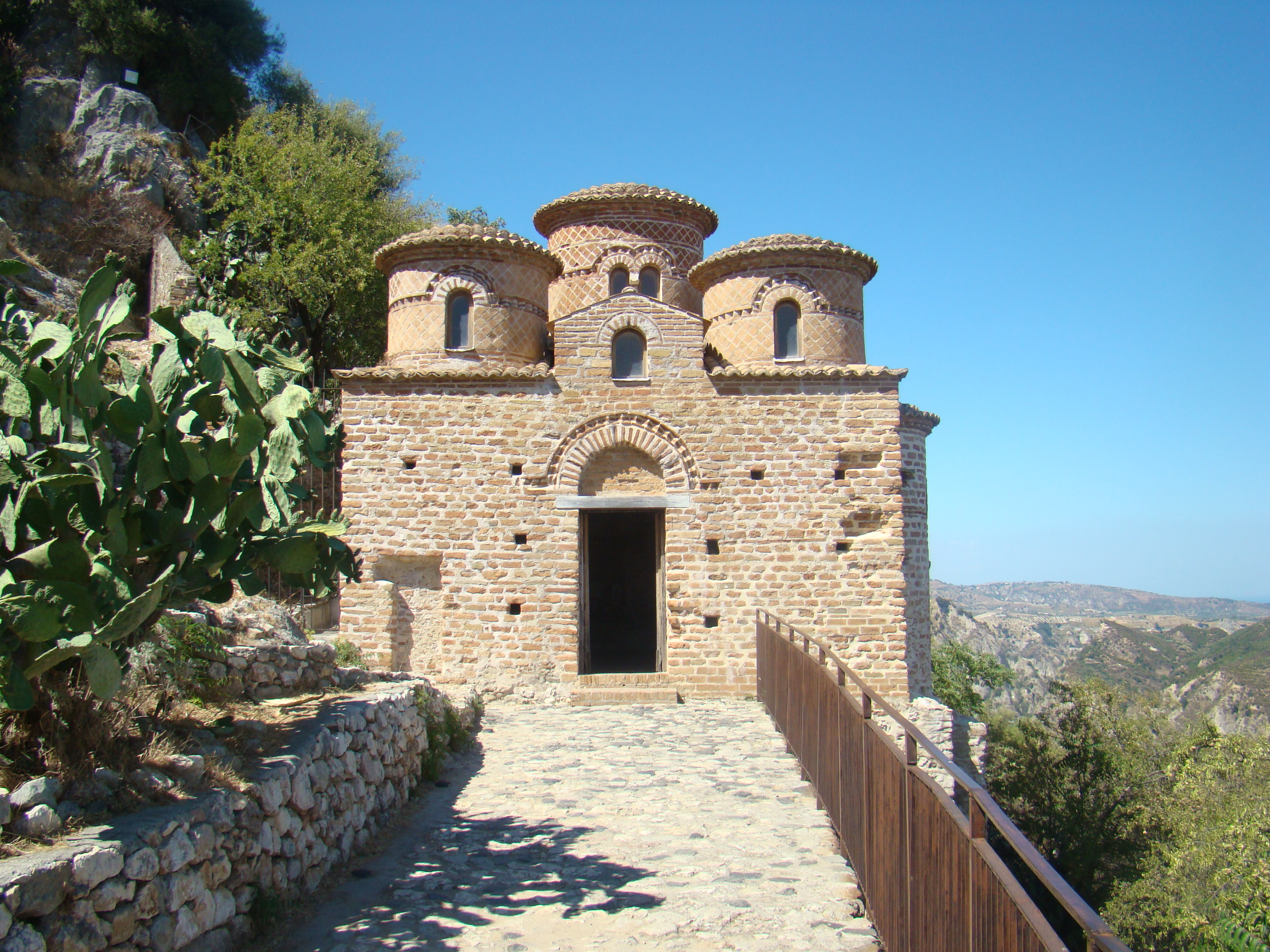
The Cattolica of Stilo, a Byzantine-style church from the 9th century.

The origins of Stilo are connected to the destruction of the ancient Greek colony of Caulonia by Dionysius II of Syracuse, followed by another by the Campanians (allies of the Romans) in 277 BC.

== Main sights ==
- The Cattolica di Stilo, a 9th-century church in the Byzantine style
- The Shrine of Saint John the Therist (Diocese of Locri-Gerace)
- Church of San Domenico
- Church of San Nicola da Tolentino
- The Norman Castle of Roger II
- The Fountain of the Dolphins

Not far from the town is the monastery of San Giovanni Theristis.

== People from Stilo ==
- Tommaso Campanella (Philosopher)
- Francesco Cozza (Painter)

== Gallery ==
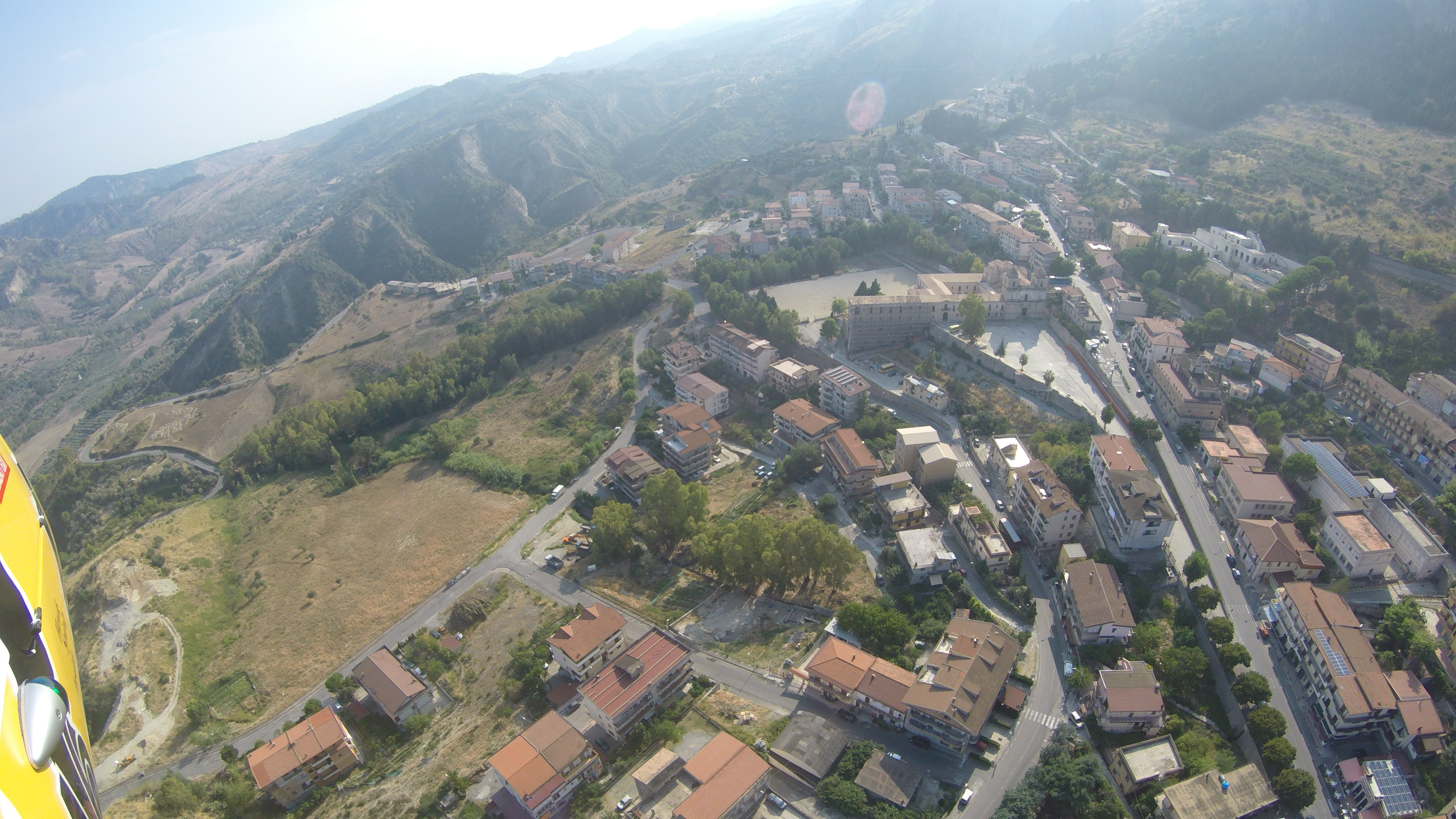
Stilo from the top with church of San Giovanni Theresti (August 2016)

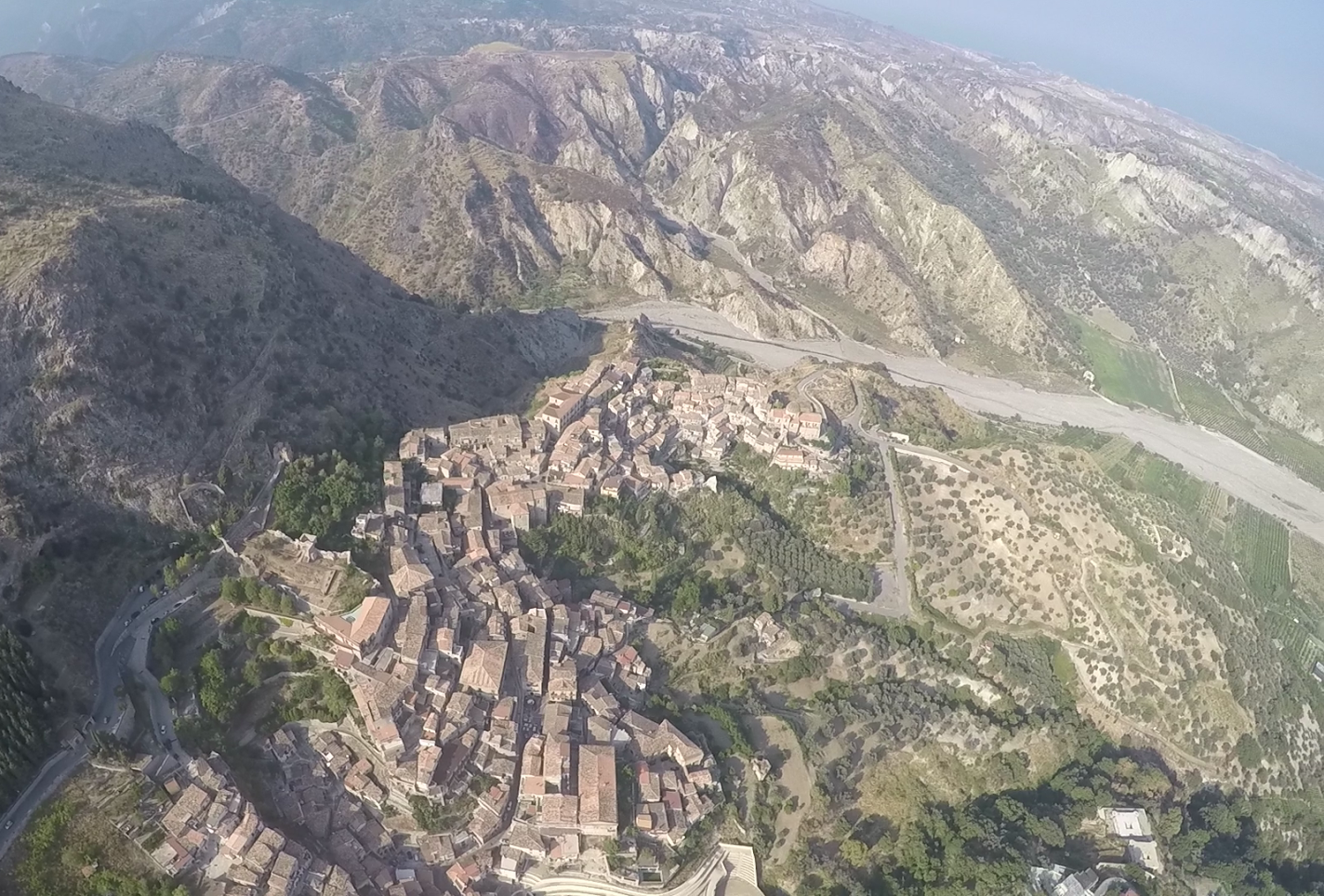
Old Stilo from the top (August 2016)

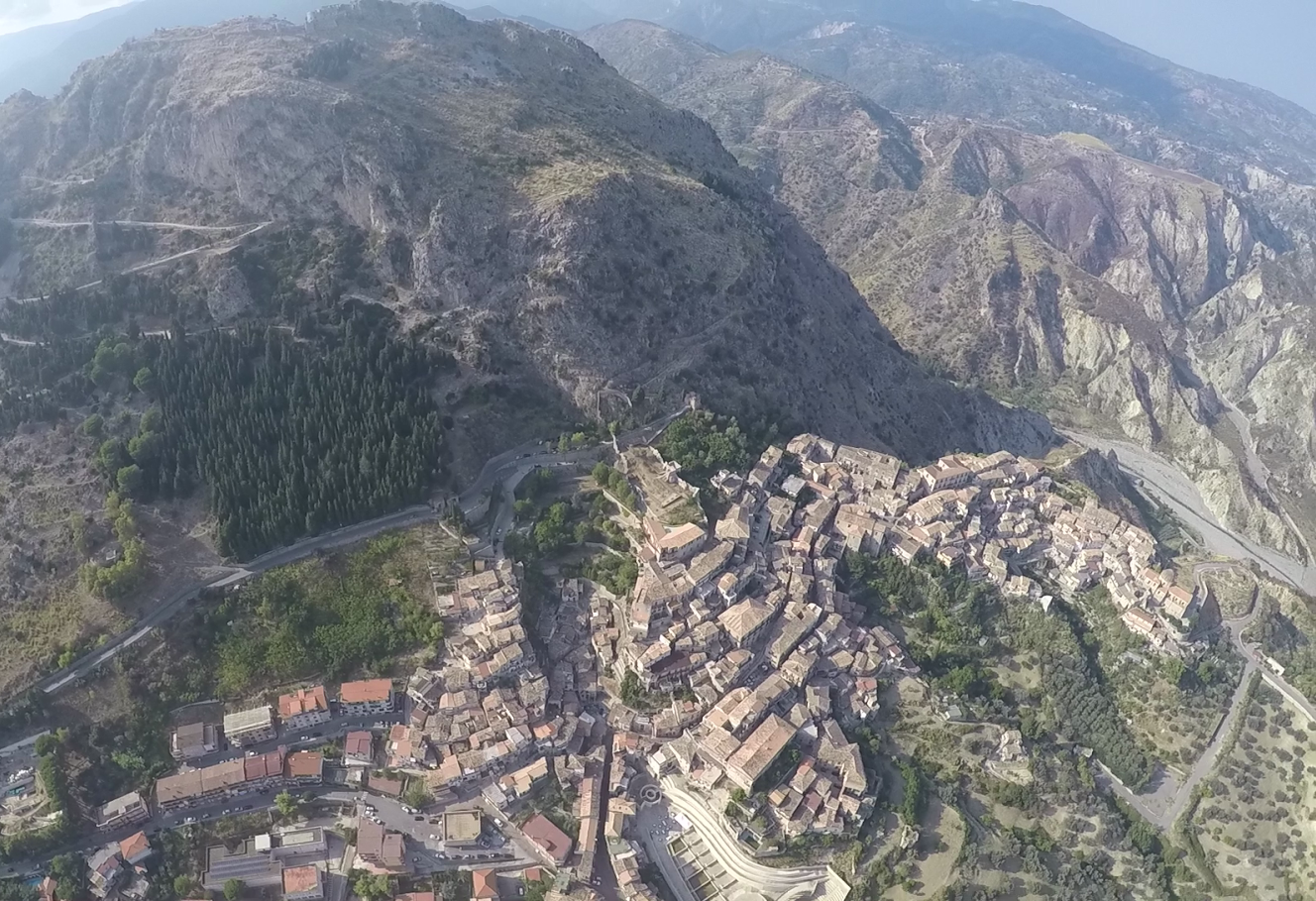
Old Stilo with Norman Castle (August 2016)

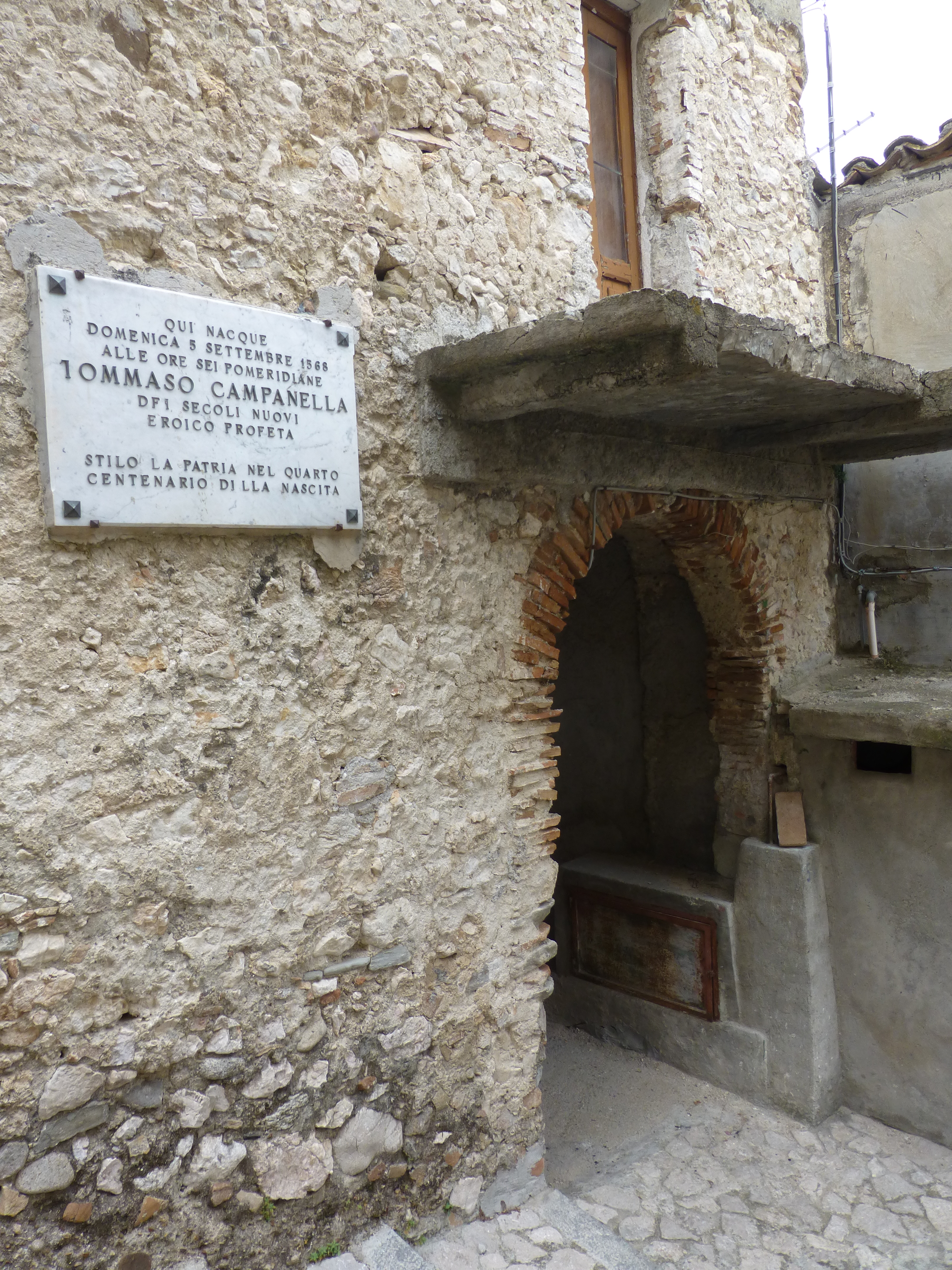
Tommaso Campanella's house at Stilo

== See also ==
- Vallata dello Stilaro Allaro
- Ecomuseo delle ferriere e fonderie di Calabria
