= Natural regional park of Serre =

Parco Naturale Regionale delle Serre
- IUCN category II (national park)
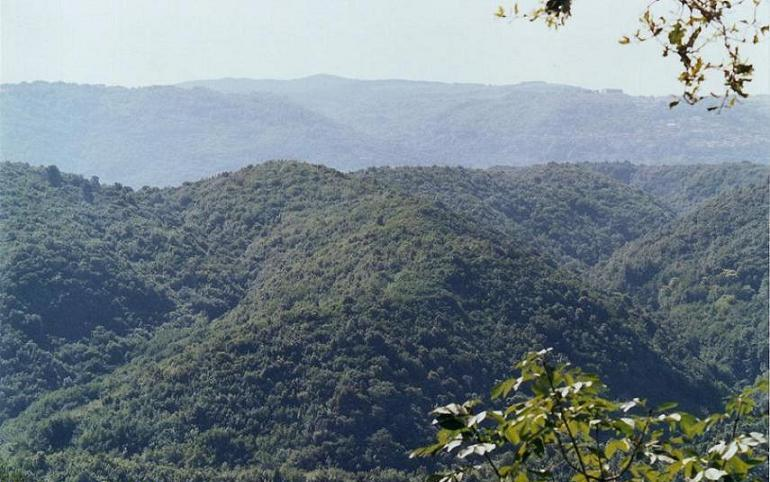
- Fallà area, Monte Cucco and other mountains

- Location within Italy
- Location: Calabria
- Nearest city: Serra San Bruno
- Coordinates: 38°33′59″N 16°22′20″E
- Area: 0.17687 km^{2} (0.06829 sq mi)
- Established: 2004
- Governing body: Regione Calabria
- Website: www.parcodelleserre.it

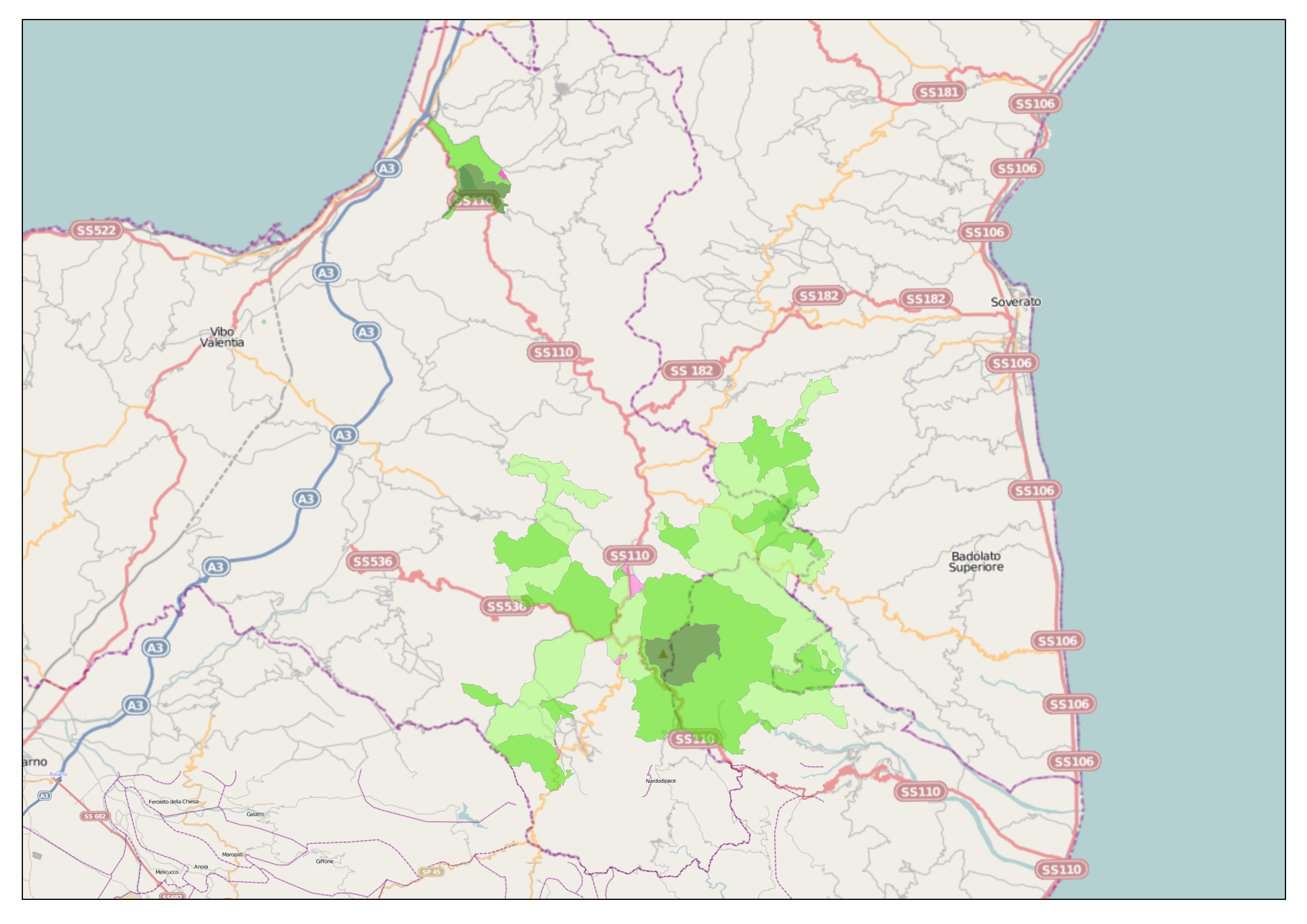
Serre park map

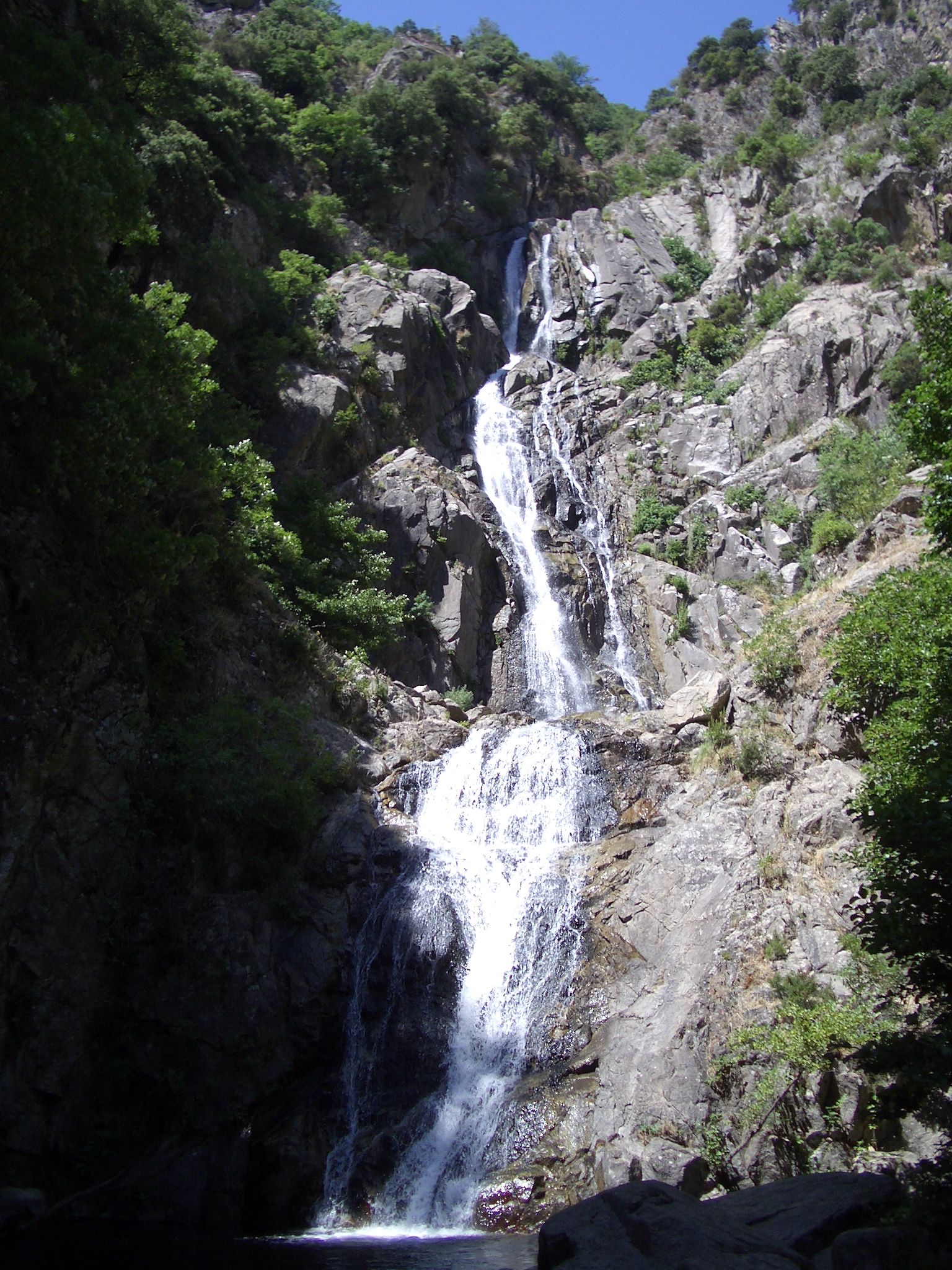
Cascata del Marmarico

The Natural Regional Park of Serre (Italian: Parco naturale regionale delle Serre) is a protected natural area of Calabria, Italy, created in 2004.

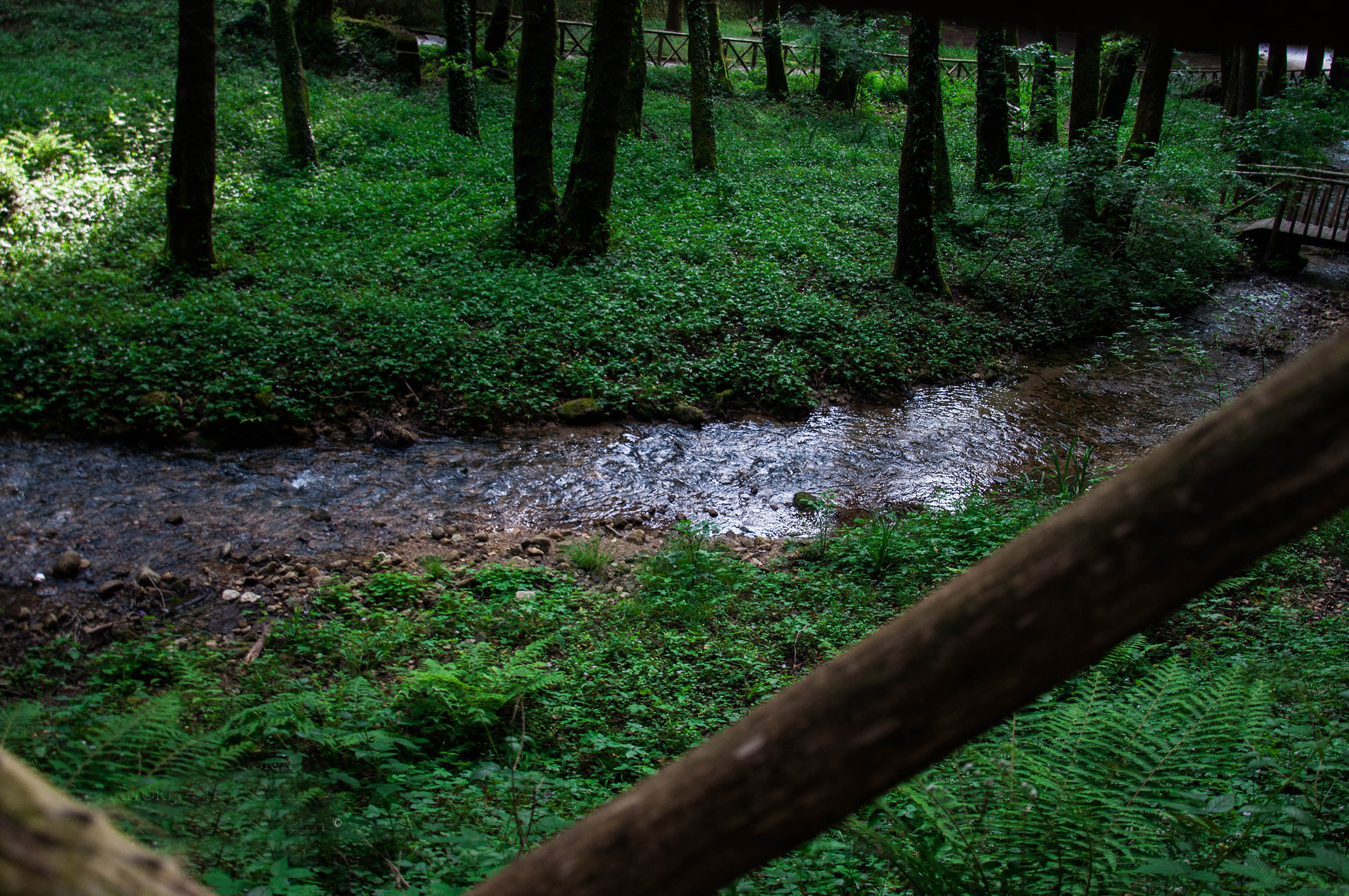
Parco naturale regionale delle Serre

== Geography ==
Located between Aspromonte and La Sila, it is crossed by two mountain ranges, Monte Pecoraro and Monte Covello, large forests, including the Wood of Stilo (Bosco di Stilo), and rivers with waterfalls, including Marmarico Falls (Cascata del Marmarico), near Bivongi, and Pietracupa Falls, near Guardavalle.

The park covers 17.687 hectares (43.71 acres) and extends into the provinces of Catanzaro, Reggio Calabria and Vibo Valentia: Acquaro, Arena, Badolato, Bivongi, Brognaturo, Cardinale, Davoli, Fabrizia, Gerocarne, Guardavalle, Maierato, Mongiana, Monterosso Calabro, Nardodipace, Pizzo, Pizzoni, Polia, Santa Caterina dello Ionio, Satriano, San Sostene, Serra San Bruno, Simbario, Sorianello, Spadola, Stilo.

== Fauna ==
In 2023, the Italian branch of the WWF began a reintroduction of the endangered Mesola red deer, which otherwise survives only in a limited population in the Bosco della Mesola Nature Reserve, starting with the gradual release of fifty deer into the park. Two fawns were born the following summer.

The animals present in the park:

=== Mammals ===
- Cervus elaphus (deer) present only at Villa Vittoria
- Capreolus capreolus (roe deer) present only at Villa Vittoria
- Dama dama (fallow deer) present only at Villa Vittoria
- Ovis musimon (mouflon) present only at Villa Vittoria
- Canis lupus italicus (Apennine wolf)
- Sus scrofa (wild boar)
- Meles meles (European badger)
- Martes foina (beech marten)
- Lepus corsicanus (Corsican hare)
- Mustela putorius (European polecat)
- Martes martes (European marten)
- Mustela nivalis (least weasel)
- Vulpes vulpes (red fox)
- Felis silvestris (European wildcat)
- Apodemus sylvaticus (wood mouse)
- Microtus arvalis (common vole)

=== Birds ===
- Pavo cristatus (peacock) present only at Villa Vittoria
- Pandion haliaetus (osprey) present only at lago Angitola
- Podiceps cristatus (great crested grebe) present only at lago Angitola
- Aythya nyroca (ferruginous duck) present only at lago Angitola
- Casmerodius albus (great white egret) present only at lago Angitola
- Falco peregrinus (peregrine falcon)
- Buteo buteo (common buzzard)
- Turdus philomelos (song thrush)
- Falco vespertinus (red-footed falcon)
- Ardea cinerea (gray heron)
- Bubo bubo (Eurasian eagle-owl)
- Asio otus (long-eared owl)
- Corvus corax (common raven)
- Scolopax rusticola (Eurasian woodcock)
- Parus major (great tit)
- Oriolus oriolus (Eurasian golden oriole)
- Turdus pilaris (fieldfare)
- Coturnix coturnix (common quail)
- Phasianus colchicus (ring-necked pheasant)
- Upupa epops (Eurasian hoopoe)
- Pica pica (Eurasian magpie)
- Carduelis carduelis (goldfinch)
- Erithacus rubecula (European robin)
- Picus viridis (European green woodpecker)
- Dendrocopos major (great spotted woodpecker)
- Corvus cornix (hooded crow)

=== Reptiles ===
- Elaphe quatuorlineata (four-lined snake)
- Natrix natrix (water snake)
- Vipera aspis (asp)
- Hierophis viridiflavus (green whip snake)
- Podarcis muralis (common wall lizard)

=== Amphibians ===
- Salamandra salamandra (fire salamander)
- Bufo bufo (common toad)

Insects:

- Vanessa atalanta (red admiral butterfly)
- Cicadidae (cicada)

== Points of interest ==
- Angitola
- Abbazia della Certosa e Museo della Certosa (Serra San Bruno)
- Santuario di Santa Maria del Bosco and sepolcro di San Bruno (Serra S. Bruno)
- Museo della Civiltà Contadina e Artigiana (Monterosso Calabro)
- Museo Multimediale delle Serre Calabresi (Monterosso Calabro)
- Villa Vittoria (Mongiana)

== See also ==
- Serre calabresi
- Ferdinandea
- Monte Pecoraro
