= Antonio Caracciolo (footballer, born 1917) =

Italian footballer

Personal information
- Date of birth: 29 January 1917
- Place of birth: Filadelfia, Italy
- Date of death: 7 March 2017 (aged 100)
- Height: 1.74 m (5 ft 8 1/2 in)
- Position: Striker

Senior career*
Years	Team	Apps	(Gls)
1937–1939	Fano	47	(21)
1939–1940	Ambrosiana-Inter	1	(0)
1940–1941	Pro Vercelli	21	(5)
1941–1942	Fanfulla	16	(3)
1942–1943	Cesena	15	(6)
1945–1946	Cosenza		
1946–1948	Cesena	33	(16)
1948–1950	Cosenza		
- * Club domestic league appearances and goals

Antonio Caracciolo (29 January 1917 – 7 March 2017) was an Italian professional footballer who played as a forward.

== Honours ==
Ambrosiana-Inter

- Serie A champion: 1939–40.
