= Reali ferriere ed Officine di Mongiana =

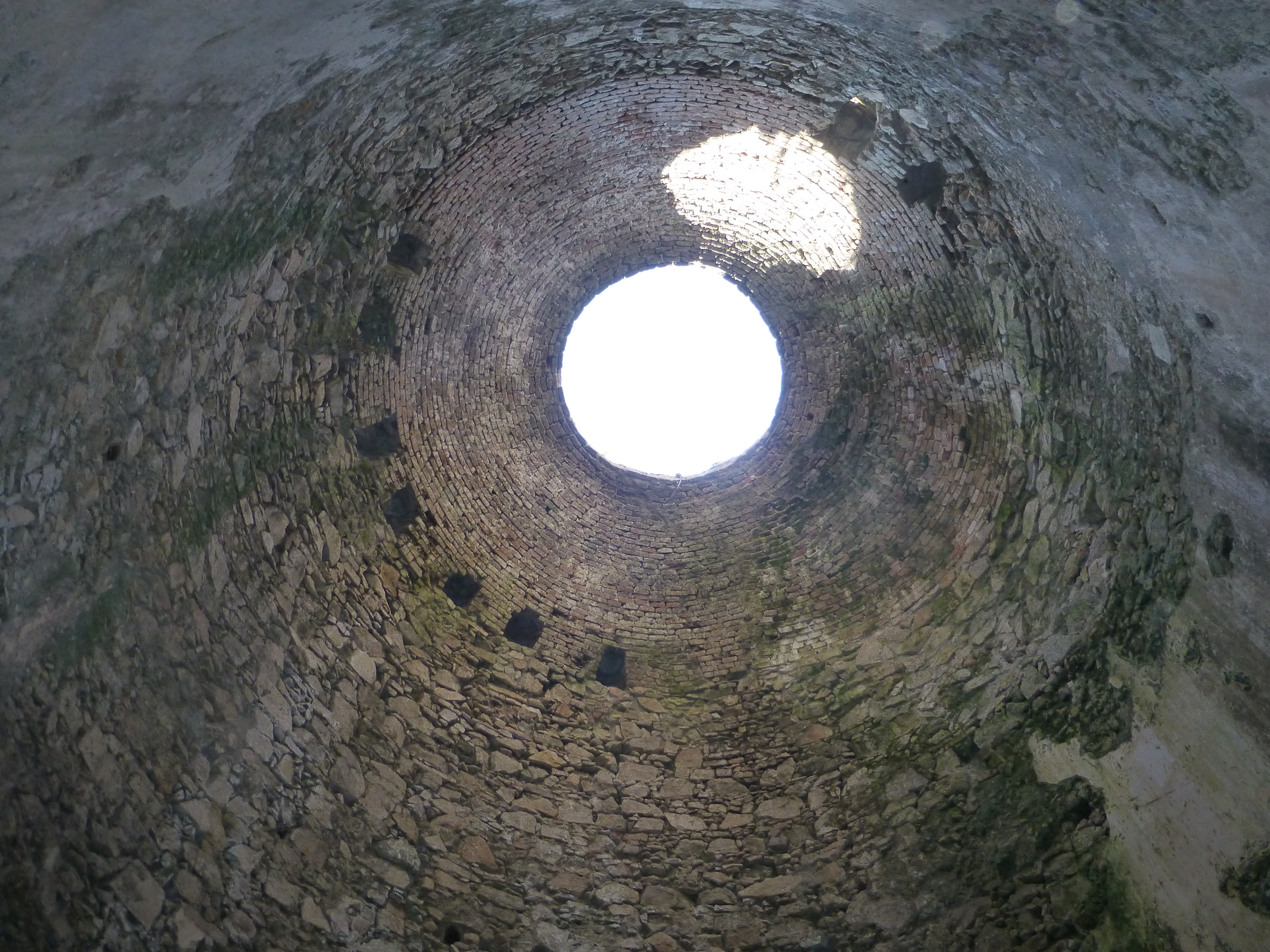
Blast furnace in Mongiana Foundry

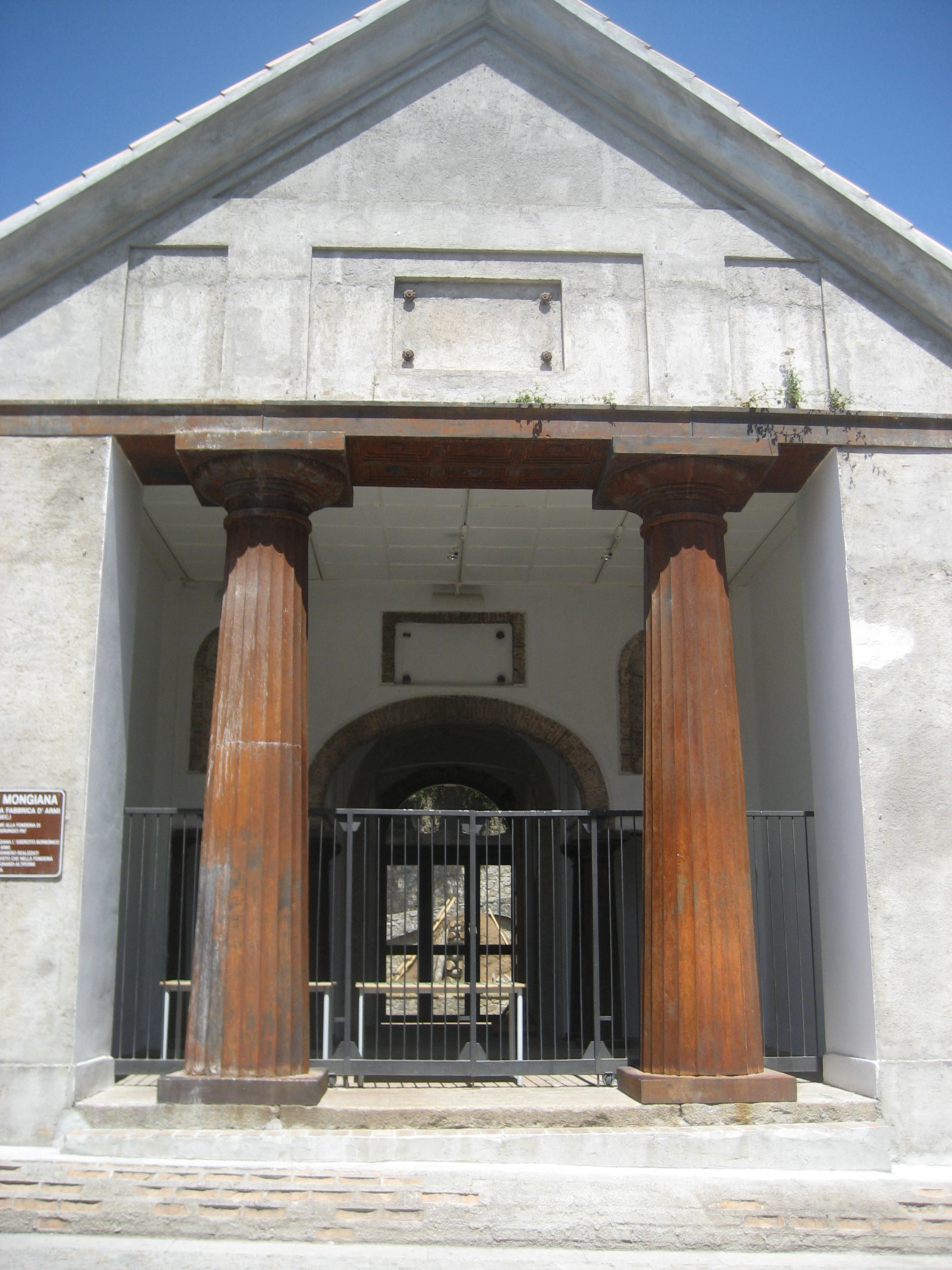
Mongiana armory

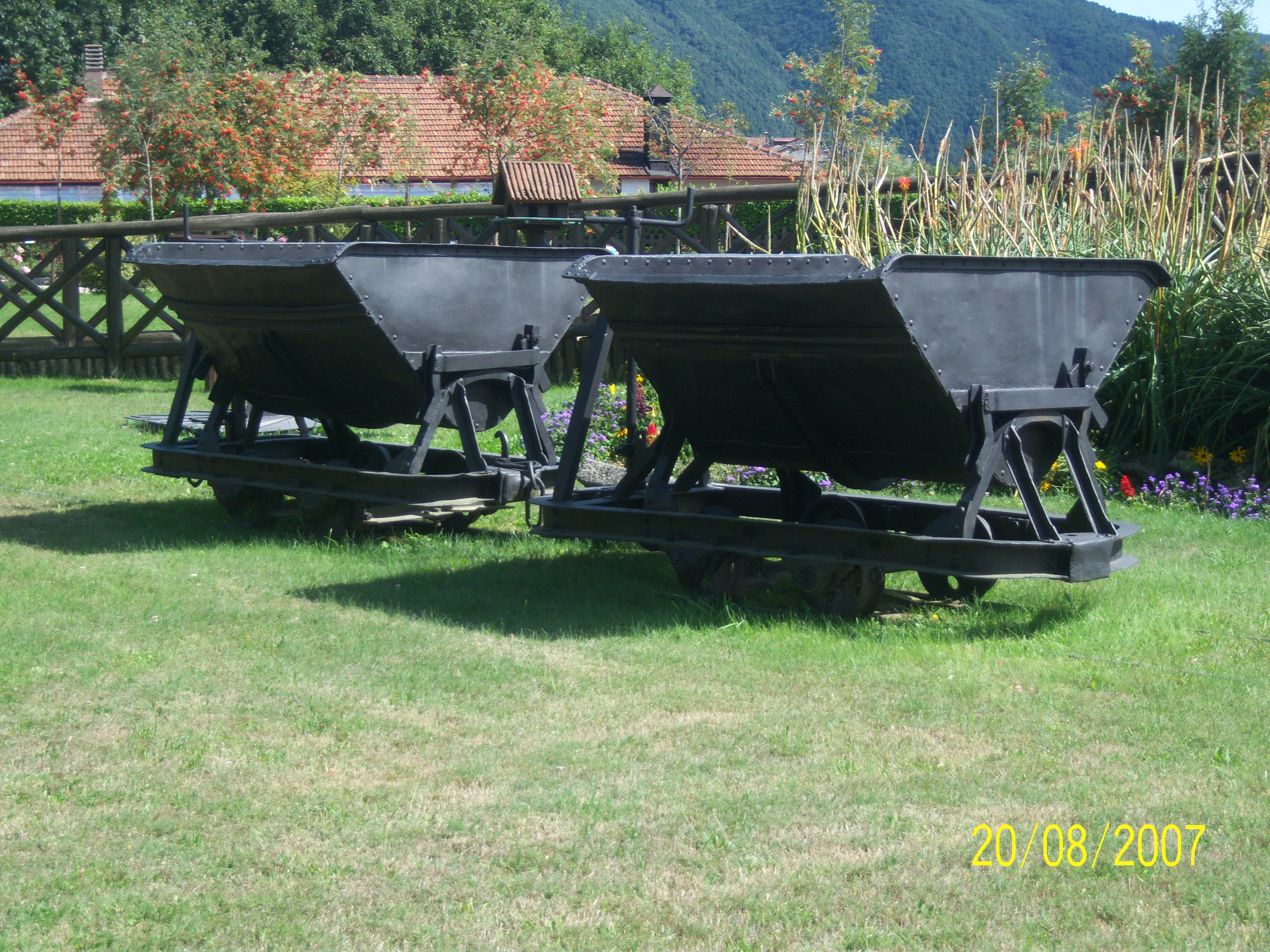
mining trucks

Reali ferriere ed Officine di Mongiana or Villaggio Siderurgico di Mongiana (in English: Mongiana Royal Iron Foundry and Works or The Iron & Steel town of Mangiano) was an iron and steel foundry in the small town of Mongiana, in Calabria (Italy). It was founded in 1770–71 by the Bourbons of Naples and closed in 1881, 20 years after the Kingdom of Italy was established. In 1860 the foundry employed up to 1600 workers.

== History ==
The architect who built the first complex was the Neapolitan Mario Gioffredo in 1771 and the first director was G.F. Conty.

== Direttori ==
- Giovan Francesco Conty (1771–1790)
- Massimiliano Conty (1791–1799)
- Vincenzo Squillace (1799–1807)
- Capitano Vincenzo Ritucci (1808–1811)
- Capitano Michele Carrascosa (1811–1814)
- Tenente Colonnello Nicola Landi (1814–1820)
- Tenente Colonnello Mori (1820–1838)
- Tenente Colonnello Niola (1839–1849)
- Tenente Colonnello Pietro Tonson Latour (1849–1852)
- Tenente Colonnello Ferdinando Pacifici (1852–1859)
- Maggiore Giuseppe Del Bono (1860–1861)
- Colonnello Alessandro Massimino (1861–1861)
- Capitano Crescenzo Montagna (1862–1870)

== Bibliography ==
- Vincenzo Falcone (2007). Le ferriere di Mongiana. Un'occasione mancata. Città Calabria Edizioni. ISBN 978-88-88948-48-5.
- Brunello De Stefano Manno (2008). Le reali ferriere ed officine di Mongiana. Città Calabria Edizioni.
- Franco Danilo (August 2003). Il ferro in Calabria. Vicende storico-economiche del trascorso industriale calabrese. Kaleidon editrice. ISBN 88-88867-01-5.
- Brunello de Stefano Manno; Gennaro Matacena (1979). Le Reali Ferriere ed officine di Mongiana (I edizione ed.). casa editrice storia di Napoli e delle due Sicilie.

== See also ==
- Mongiana
- Vallata dello Stilaro
- Serre calabresi
- Ecomuseo delle ferriere e fonderie di Calabria
- Officine di Pietrarsa
