= Ferdinandea (Calabria) =

Coordinates: 38°30′32″N 16°22′47″E

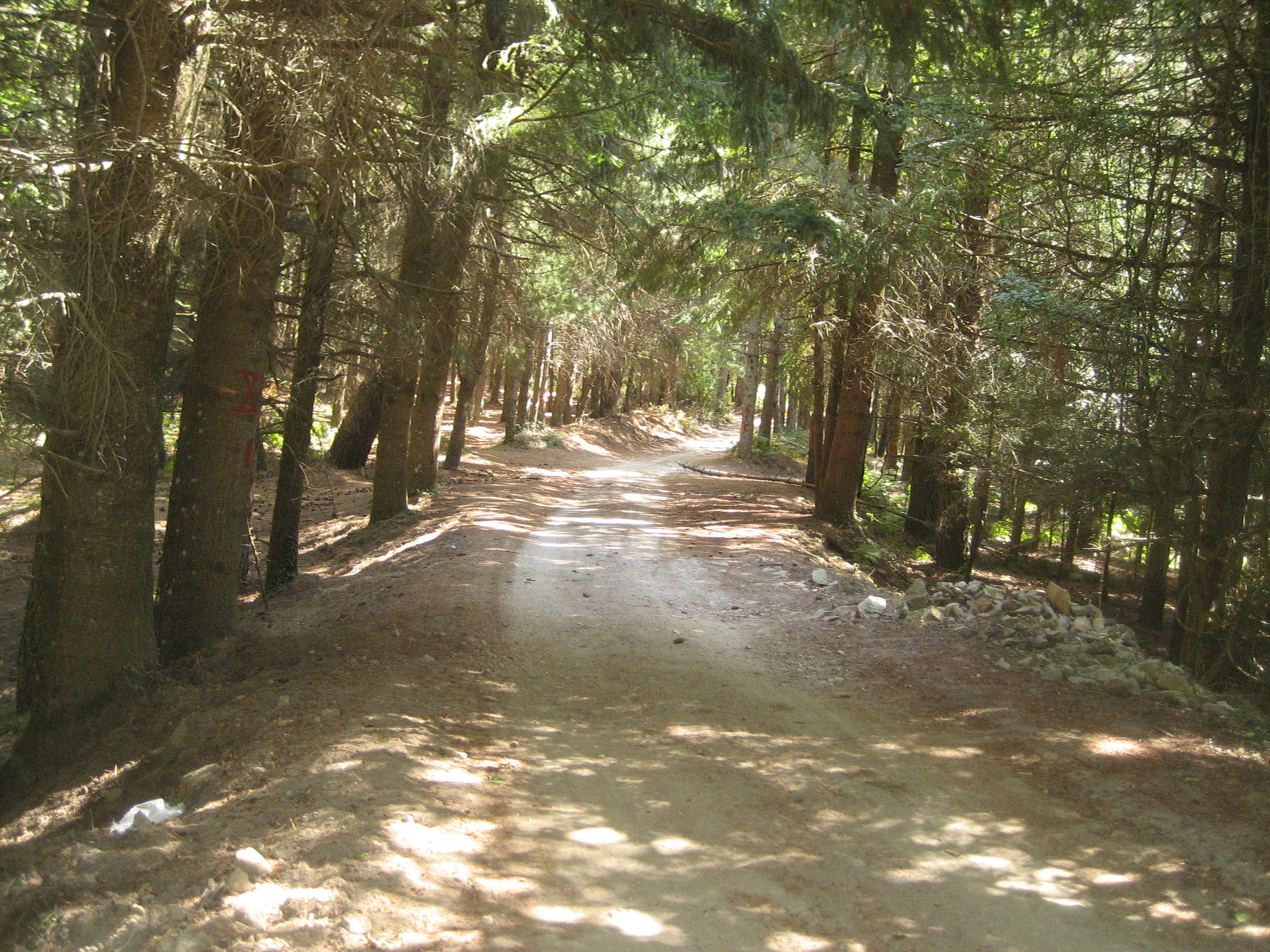
A path of in Ferdinandea.

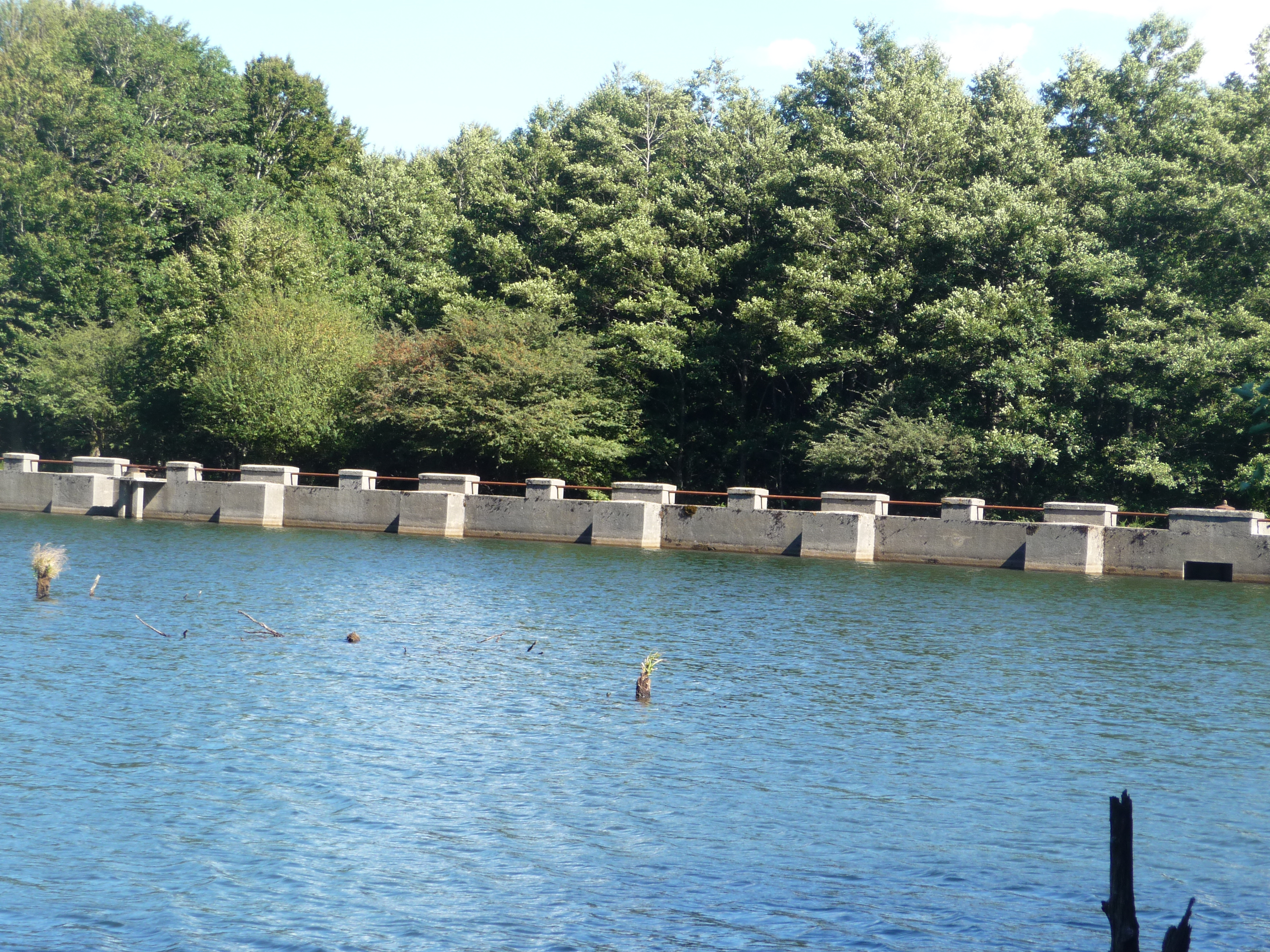
Giulia's dam

Ferdinandea is an area of 3600 hectare in Serre Calabresi (Calabria, southern Italy) included in the territories of Bivongi, Stilo, Brognaturo, Mongiana and Serra San Bruno in the provinces of Reggio Calabria and Vibo Valentia.

Ferdinandea is entirely covered by fir and beech woods.

The name originates from King Ferdinand II of the Two Sicilies, who used the area for hunting after 1832. He later turned it into a metal industry center, building here a foundry, ironworks, residential and administrative buildings and stables.

== Industrial archeology ==
The area is part of Ecomuseo delle ferriere e fonderie di Calabria, a museum devoted to the research and restoration of industrial archaeology of the area.

== Gallery ==
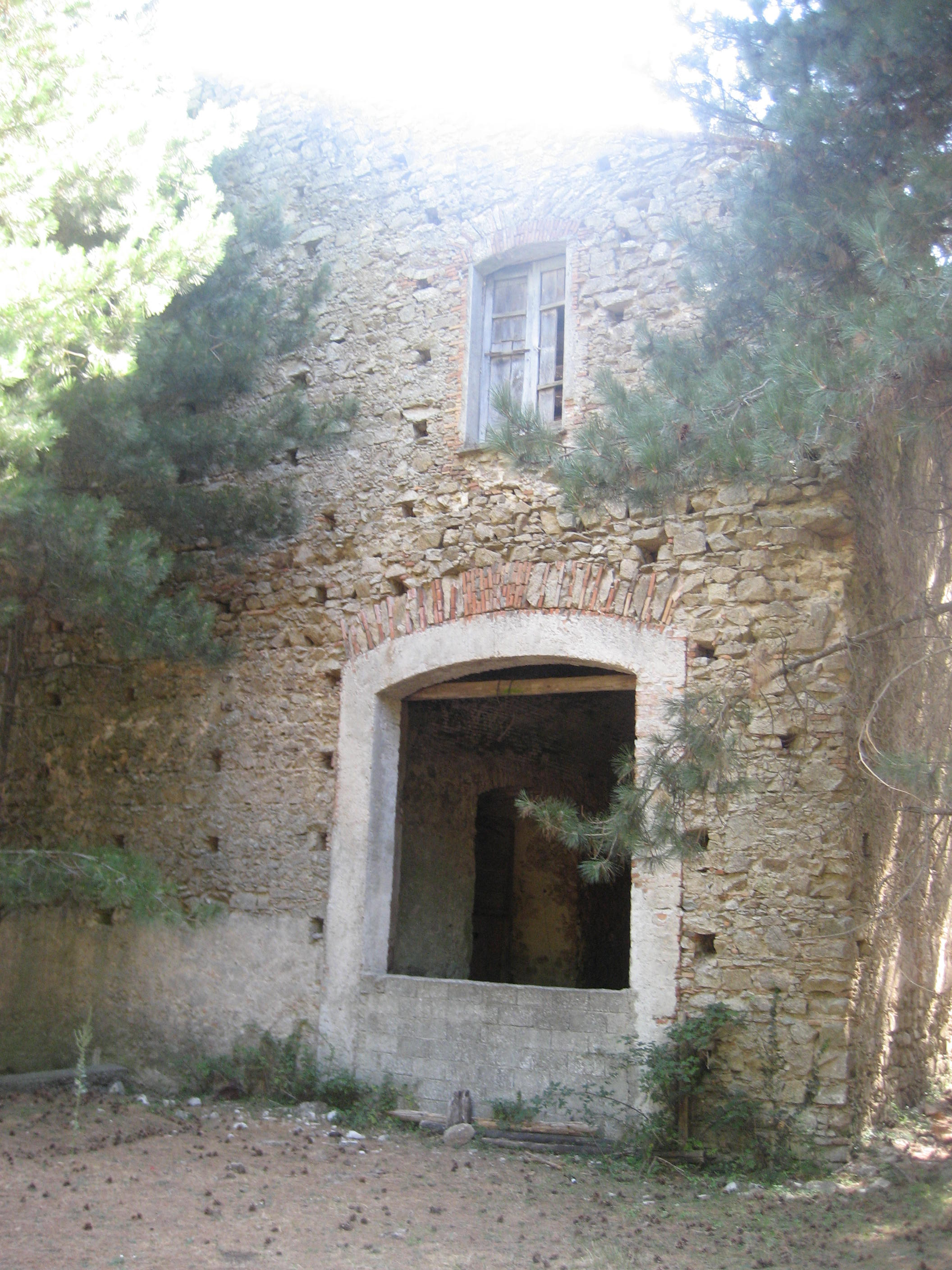
Ferriera

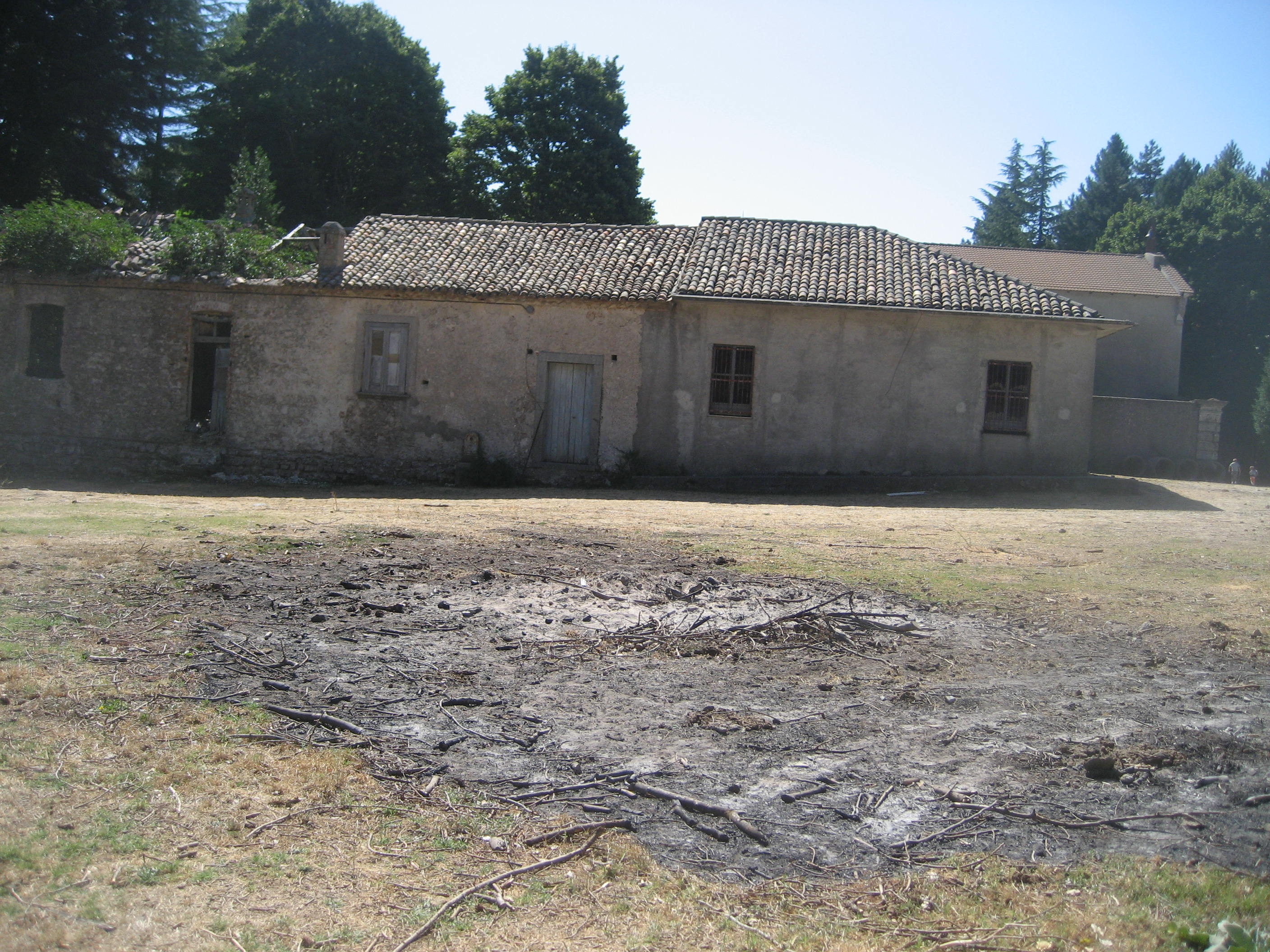
Borbonic hunting estate

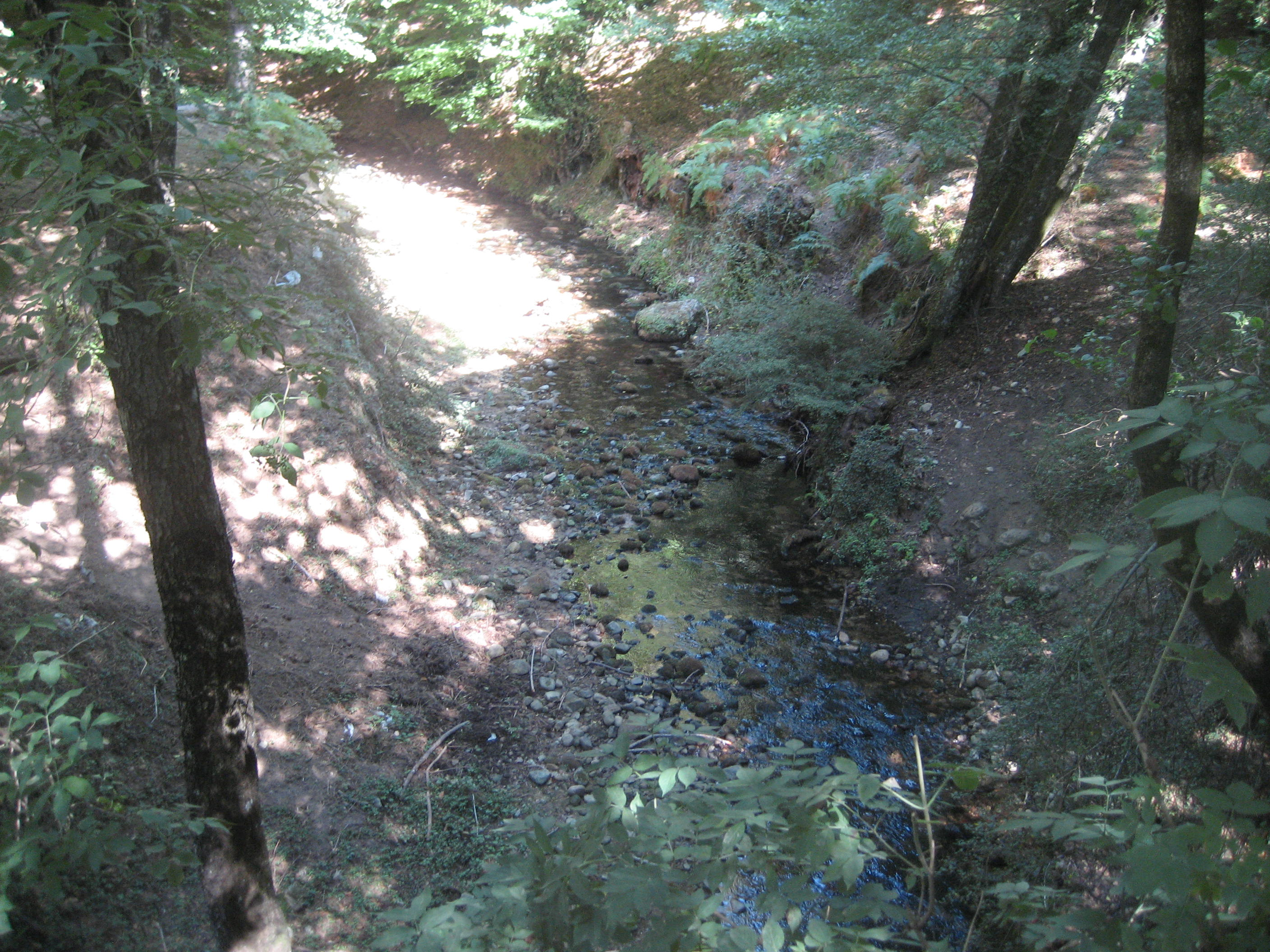
small river in Ferdinandea

== See also ==
- Ecomuseo delle ferriere e fonderie di Calabria
