= Francavilla Angitola =

- Comune
- Comune di Francavilla Angitola
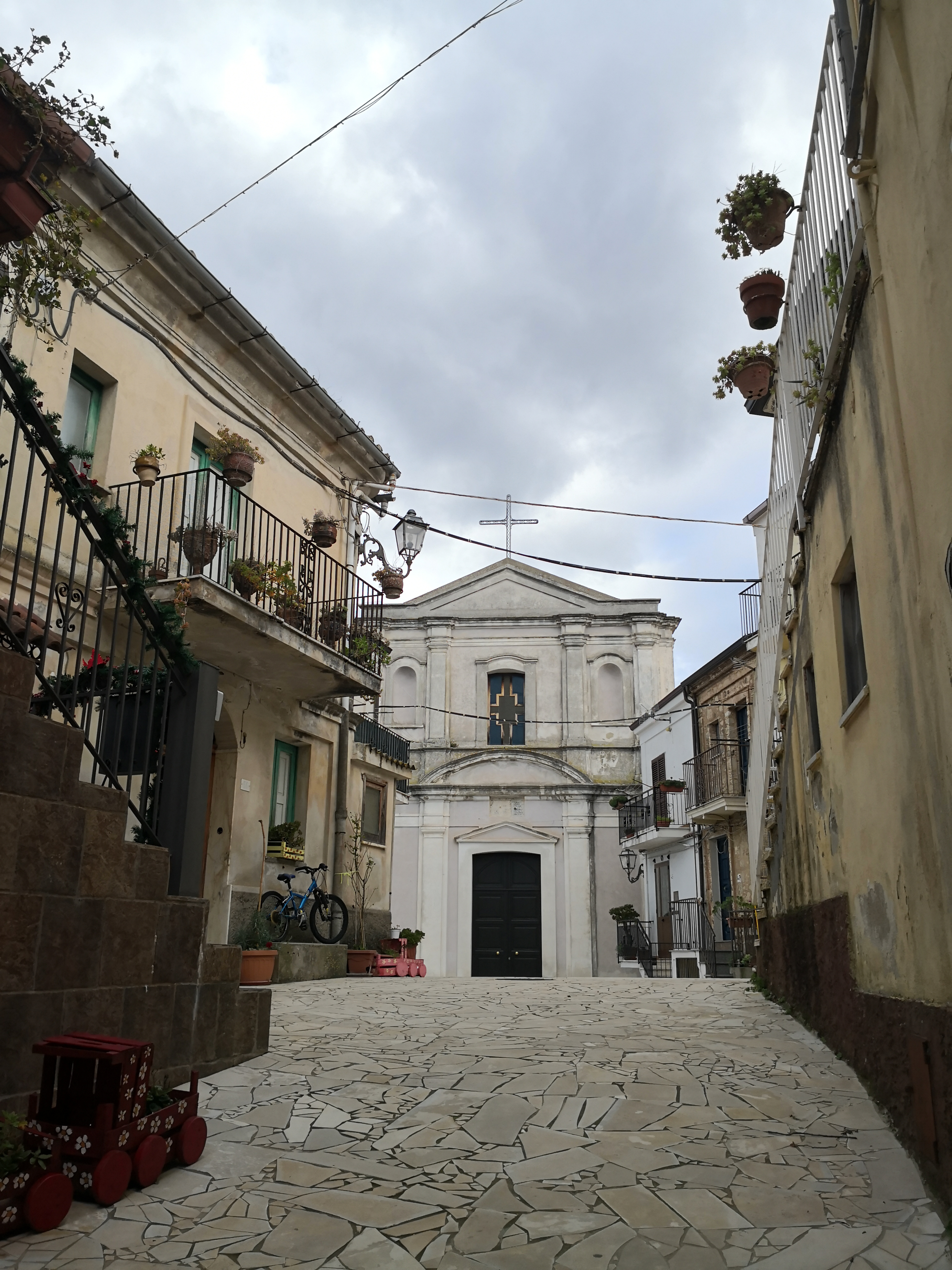

- Location within Italy Location within Calabria
- Coordinates: 38°47′N 16°16′E
- Country: Italy
- Region: Calabria
- Province: Province of Vibo Valentia (VV)

Area
  - Total: 28.3 km^{2} (10.9 sq mi)

Population (2018-01-01)
  - Total: 1,906
  - Density: 67.3/km^{2} (174/sq mi)
- Time zone: UTC+1 (CET)
  - Summer (DST): UTC+2 (CEST)

Francavilla Angitola is a comune (municipality) in the Province of Vibo Valentia in the Italian region Calabria, located about 30 kilometres (19 mi) southwest of Catanzaro and about 20 kilometres (12 mi) northeast of Vibo Valentia.

Francavilla Angitola borders the following municipalities: Curinga, Filadelfia, Maierato, Pizzo, Polia.

In the località of Ponte Angitola, in the comune, was the Roman settlement and river crossing named Ad Fluvium Angitulam or Annicia.

== Demographic evolution ==
Historical population

| Year | Pop. | ±% |
|---|---|---|
| 1861 | 1,461 | — |
| 1871 | 1,533 | +4.9% |
| 1881 | 1,511 | −1.4% |
| 1901 | 2,159 | +42.9% |
| 1911 | 2,285 | +5.8% |

| Year | Pop. | ±% |
|---|---|---|
| 1921 | 2,703 | +18.3% |
| 1931 | 2,946 | +9.0% |
| 1936 | 2,221 | −24.6% |
| 1951 | 2,658 | +19.7% |
| 1961 | 3,685 | +38.6% |

| Year | Pop. | ±% |
|---|---|---|
| 1971 | 3,019 | −18.1% |
| 1981 | 3,049 | +1.0% |
| 1991 | 3,018 | −1.0% |
| 2001 | 2,354 | −22.0% |

Source: Data from ISTAT
