= Ecomuseo delle ferriere e fonderie di Calabria =

Coordinates: 38.48175631°N 16.45277693°E

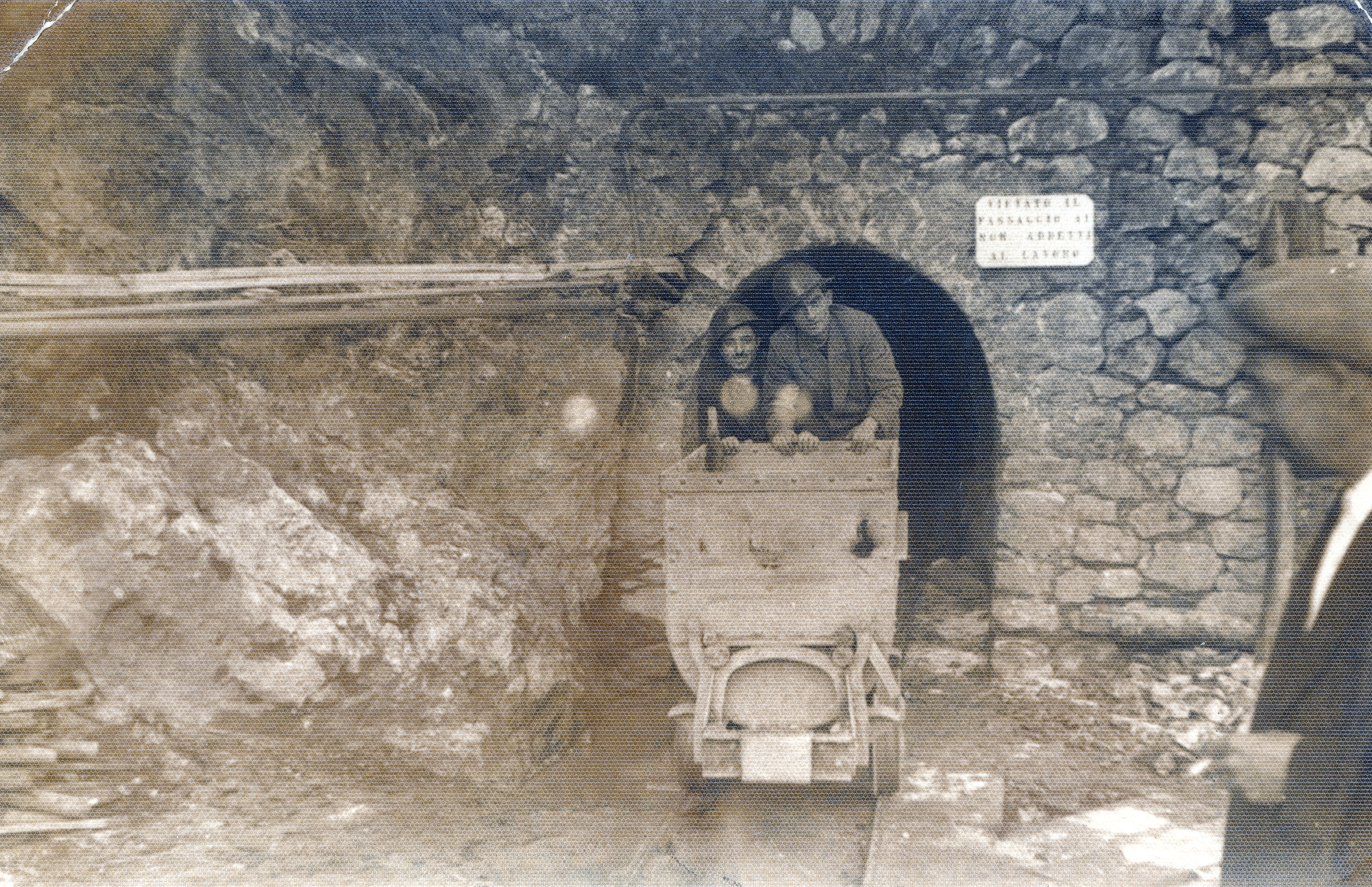
A mine.

The Ecomuseo delle ferriere e fonderie di Calabria (Ecomuseum of the iron-works and iron-foundries of Calabria) is an ecomuseum in Bivongi, Calabria, southern Italy.

The project was founded in 1982 by the Associazione Calabrese Archeologia Industriale (Calabrian Association for Industrial Archaeology). Its purposes are research, study, preservation and cultural promotion of the Calabrian industrial heritage, and, in particular, what remains of it in the Vallata dello Stilaro and Serre Calabresi.

== Itineraries ==
The museum incorporates four itineraries focussing on:

- Waters and metallurgy
- Mines
- Mills
- Religion

== Gallery ==
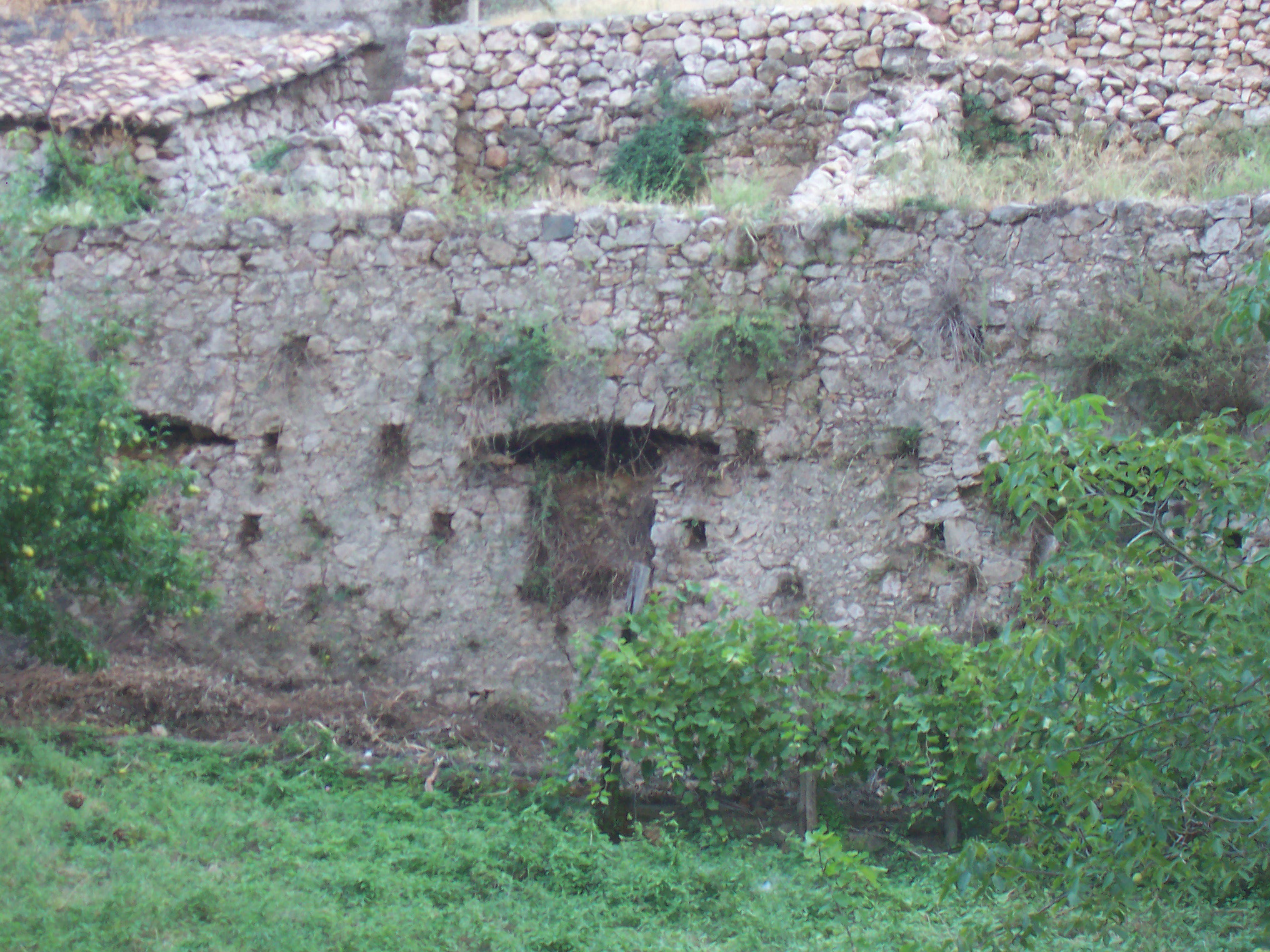
Ancient mine in Pazzano

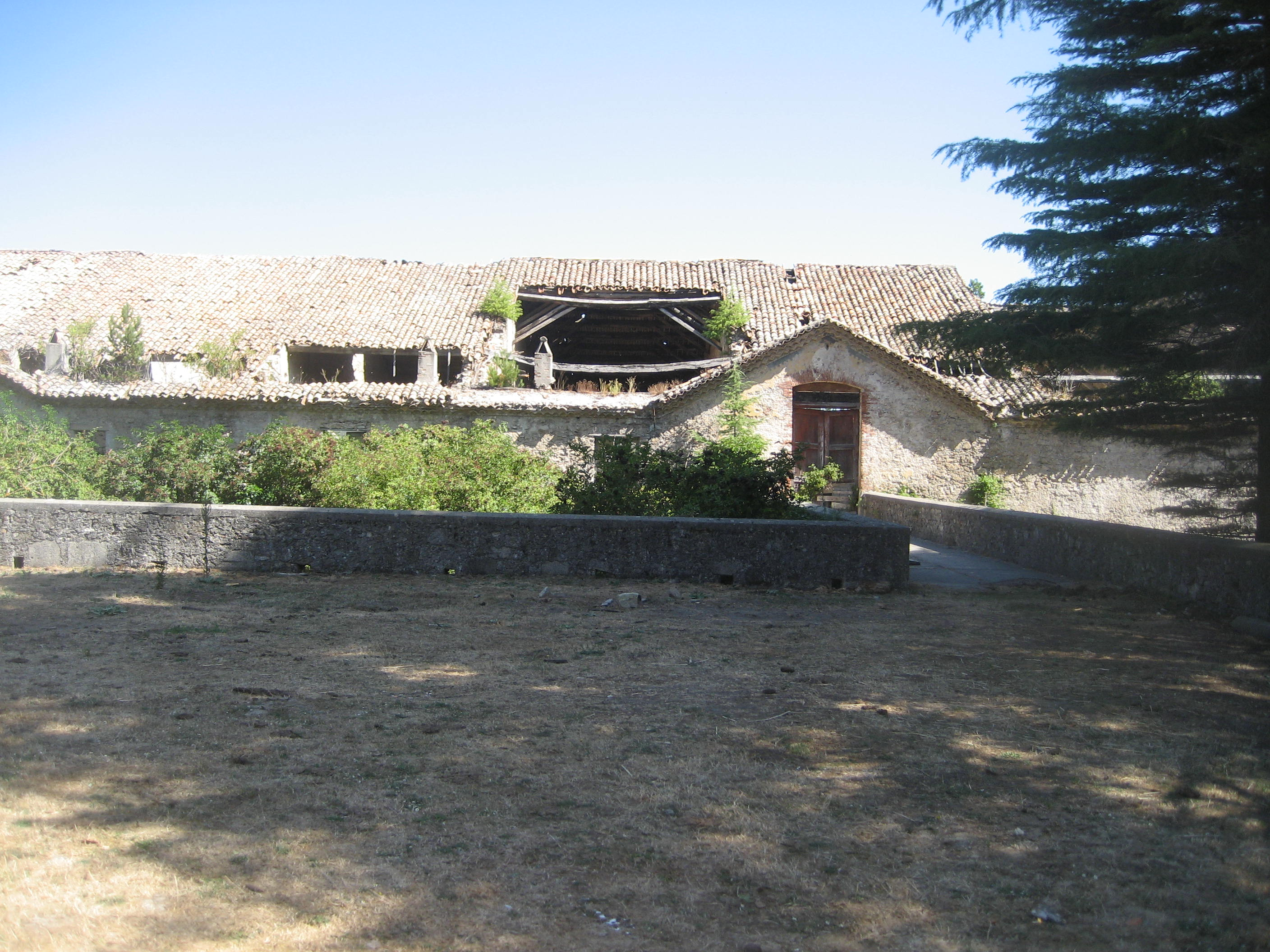
Ancient foundry at Ferdinandea

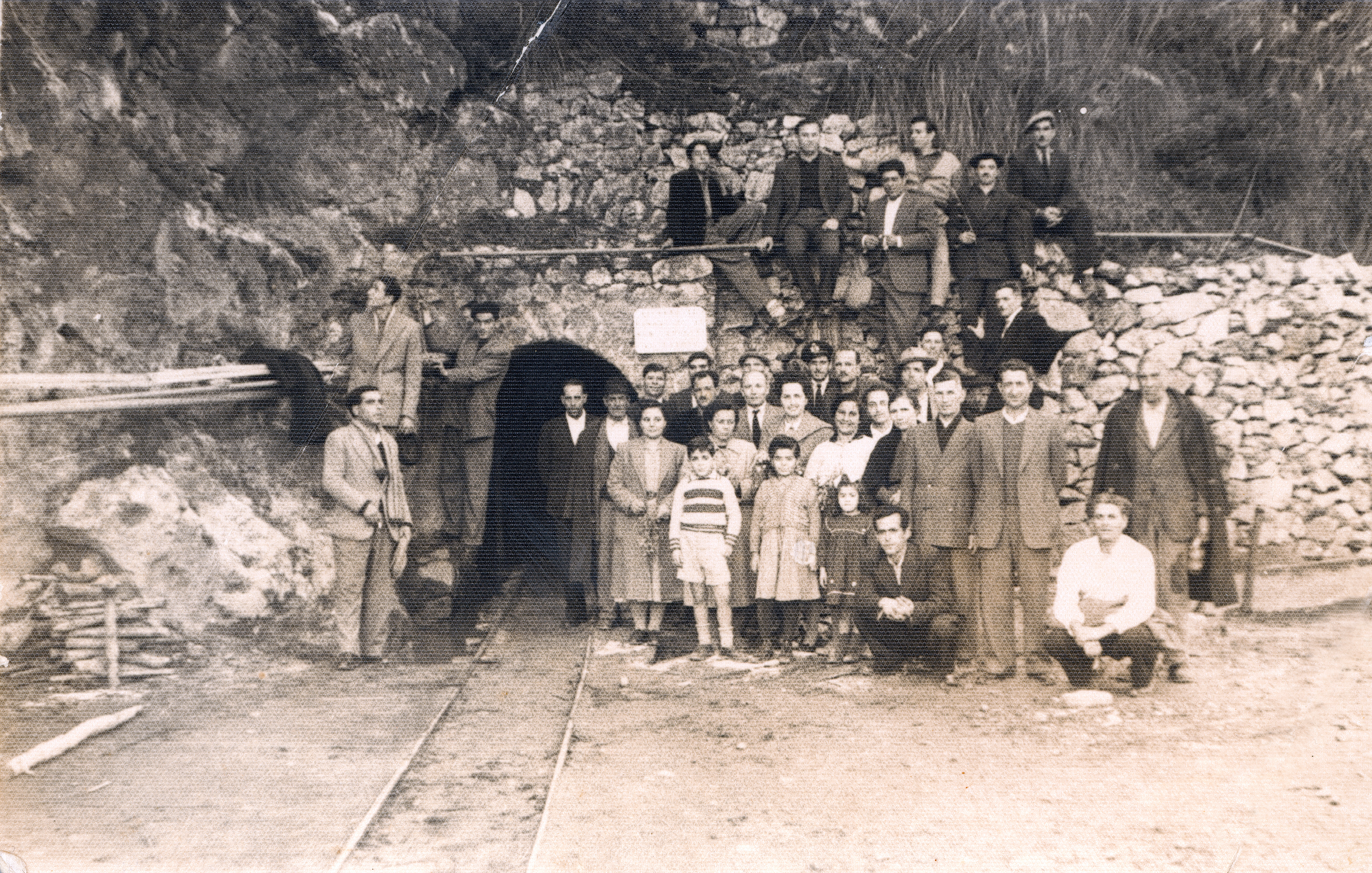
Bivongi's Mine

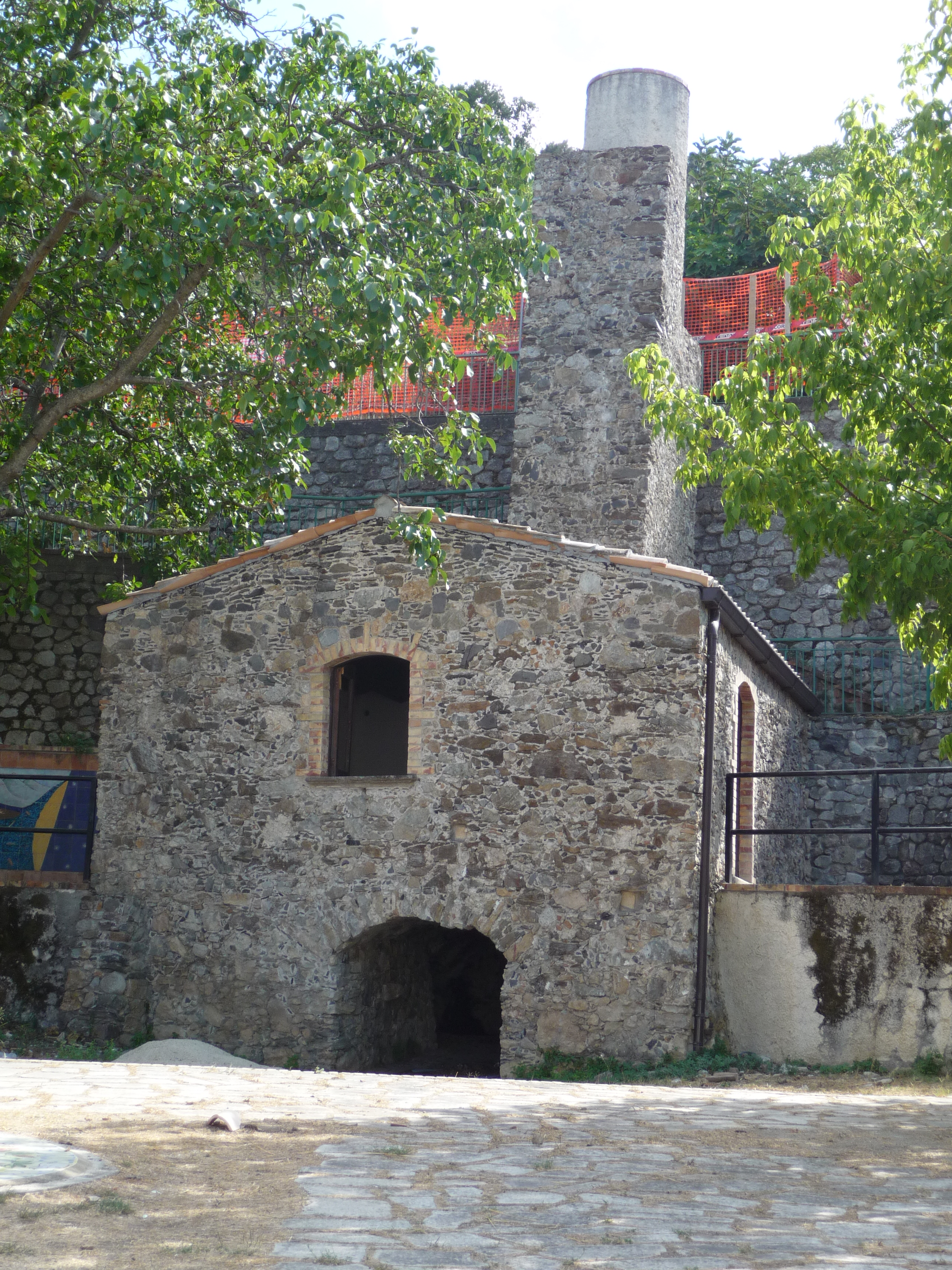
Mulino del Regnante (mill) at Bivongi

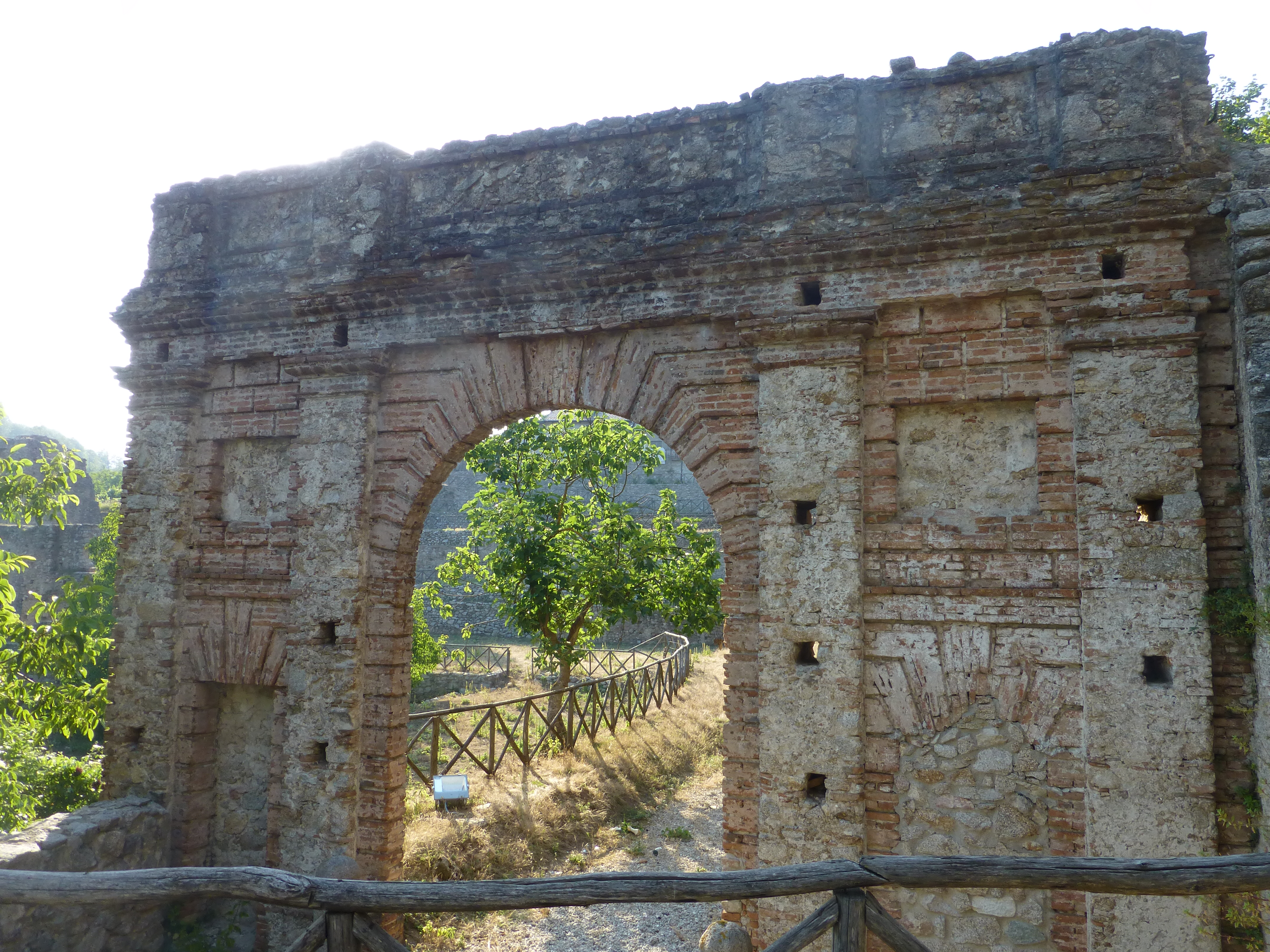
Main entrance of Mongiana Foundry

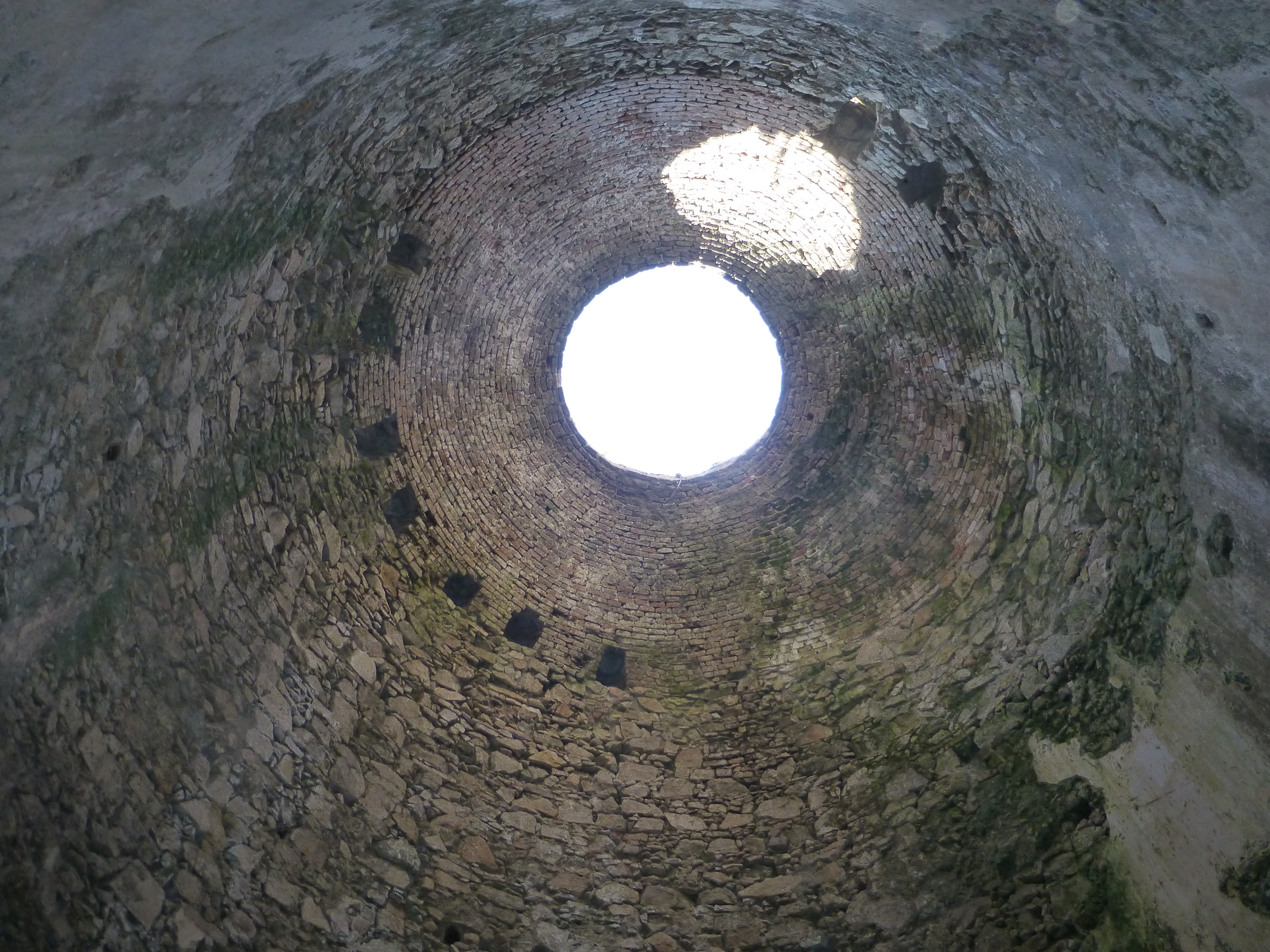
blast furnace in Mongiana Foundry

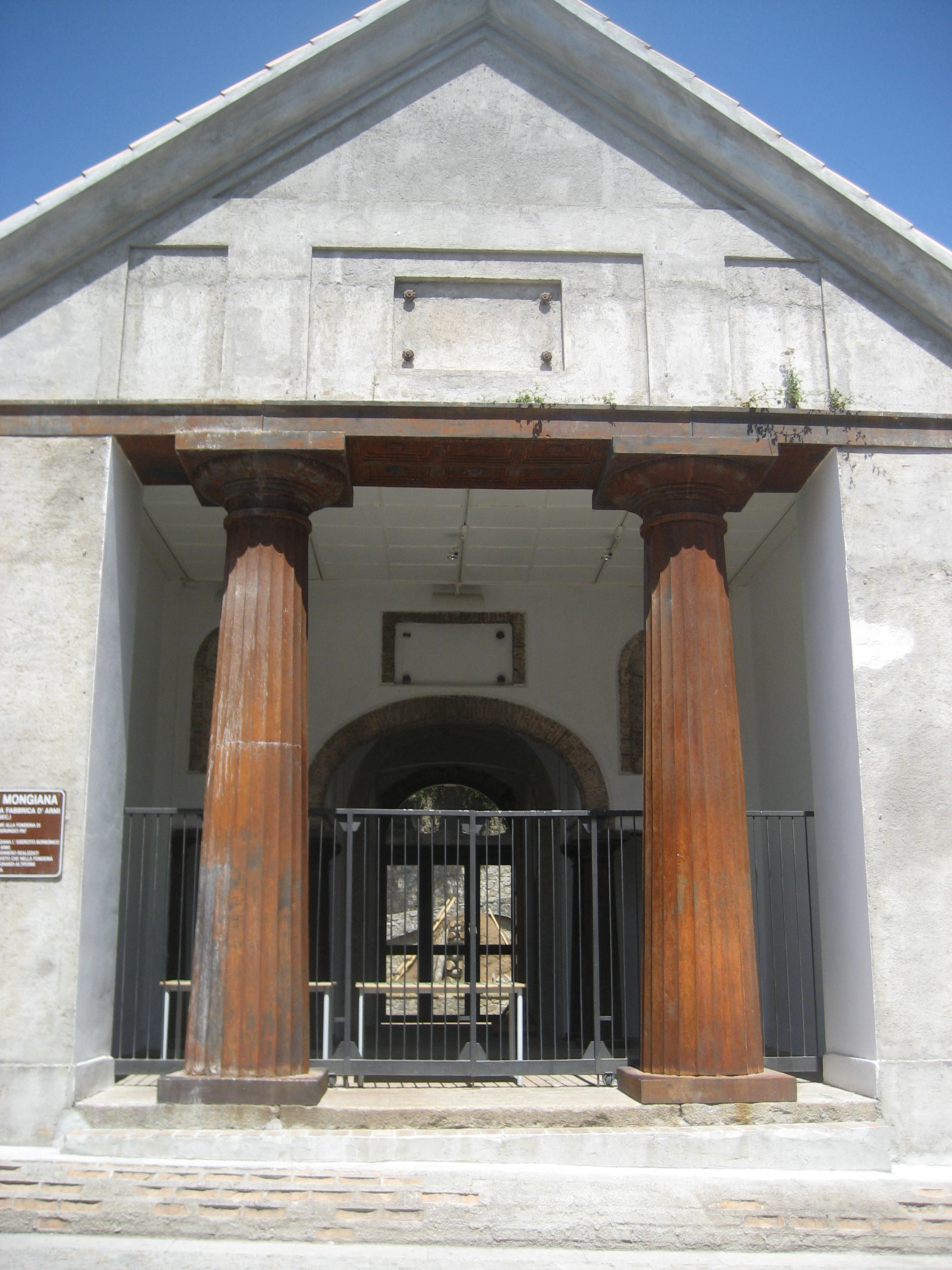
Mongiana armory

== See also ==
- Serre Calabresi
- Ecomuseum
- Industrial archeology
- Reali ferriere ed Officine di Mongiana

== Sources ==
- Danilo, Franco (2003). Il ferro in Calabria.Vicende storico-economiche del trascorso industriale calabrese. Kaleidon.
