= Filadelfia, Calabria =

Filadelfia Greek: Φιλαδέλφεια
- Comune
- Comune di Filadelfia
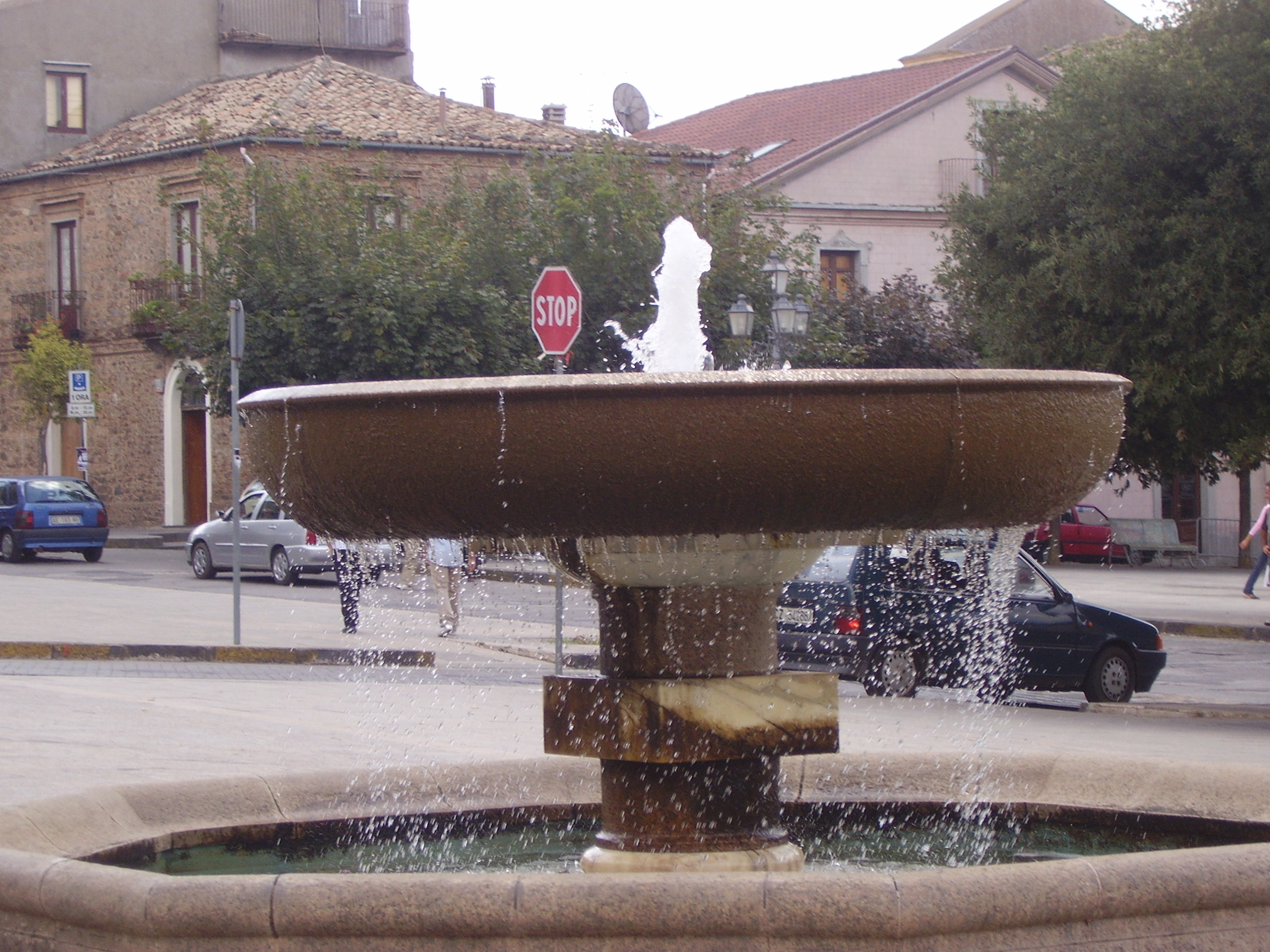

- Location within Italy Location within Calabria
- Coordinates: 38°47′N 16°17′E
- Country: Italy
- Region: Calabria
- Province: Province of Vibo Valentia (VV)
- Frazioni: Montesoro

Area
  - Total: 30 km^{2} (12 sq mi)

Population (Dec. 2013)
  - Total: 5,500
  - Density: 180/km^{2} (470/sq mi)
- Demonym: Filadelfini
- Time zone: UTC+1 (CET)
  - Summer (DST): UTC+2 (CEST)
- Postal code: 89814
- Dialing code: 0968
- Website: Official website

Filadelfia is a comune (municipality) in the Province of Vibo Valentia in the Italian region Calabria, located about 30 kilometres (19 mi) southwest of Catanzaro and about 20 kilometres (12 mi) northeast of Vibo Valentia. The city was built in 1783 by the people of Castelmonardo, on land that was 6 kilometres (4 mi) from their city that was destroyed by an earthquake. It was named after the city of Philadelphia in the United States. As of 31 December 2013, it had a population of 5,500 and an area of 30 square kilometres (12 mi^{2}).

The municipality of Filadelfia contains the frazioni (subdivisions) of Montesoro, Pontenisi, Zagheria, Shiocca, Scarro, Nucarelle, Lucente and many other tiny villages.

Filadelfia borders the following municipalities: Curinga, Francavilla Angitola, Jacurso, Polia.

== Demographic evolution ==
Historical population

Year	Pop.	±%
1861	5,422	—
1871	6,046	+11.5%
1881	6,480	+7.2%
1901	6,634	+2.4%
1911	7,895	+19.0%

Year	Pop.	±%
1921	9,480	+20.1%
1931	9,588	+1.1%
1936	8,748	−8.8%
1951	9,674	+10.6%
1961	9,092	−6.0%

Year	Pop.	±%
1971	8,651	−4.9%
1981	8,495	−1.8%
1991	8,099	−4.7%
2001	6,283	−22.4%

Source: Data from ISTAT

Filadelfia has seen a large decrease in people recently. This is due to the undeveloped technology and living conditions. It is at high elevation (roughly 600 m) and is at risk of earthquakes. In the summertime, July and August, this small, inviting town receives many tourists from Switzerland. People from the United States, Germany and France are also spotted here during the summer months. Younger people are leaving the town at a fast pace to find employment. They are moving to cities in a process known as urbanization. Many homes in this small town in Calabria, are "for sale" or "vendesi". About 20 years ago, the population was about 10,000. It is currently below 5,900.
