= Angitola Lake =

Lake in Vibo Valentia, Calabria, Italy

Angitola Lake Lago dell'Angitola
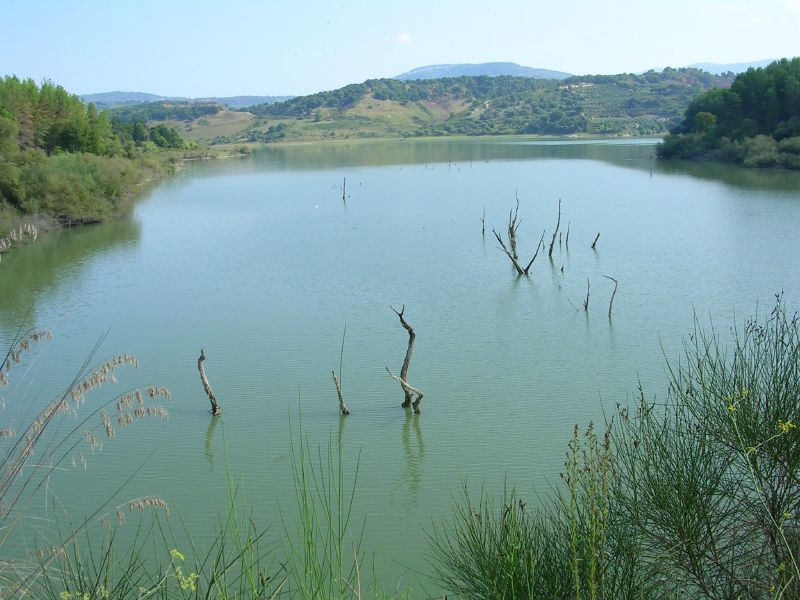

- Location within Italy
- Location: Maierato, Province of Vibo Valentia, Calabria
- Coordinates: 38.7388°N 16.2389°E
- Primary inflows: Angitola
- Primary outflows: Angitola
- Basin countries: Italy
- Surface area: 1.96 km^{2} (0.76 sq mi)

Angitola Lake or Lago dell'Angitola is a lake at Maierato, Province of Vibo Valentia, Calabria, Italy.

The lake was created artificially from an arm of the river Angitola. Its surface area is 1.96 km^{2}.

The lake is a designated wildlife area, managed by WWF Italy.
