= Passo della Limina =

Mountain pass in Calabria, Italy

Coordinates: 38°23′34″N 16°11′18″E

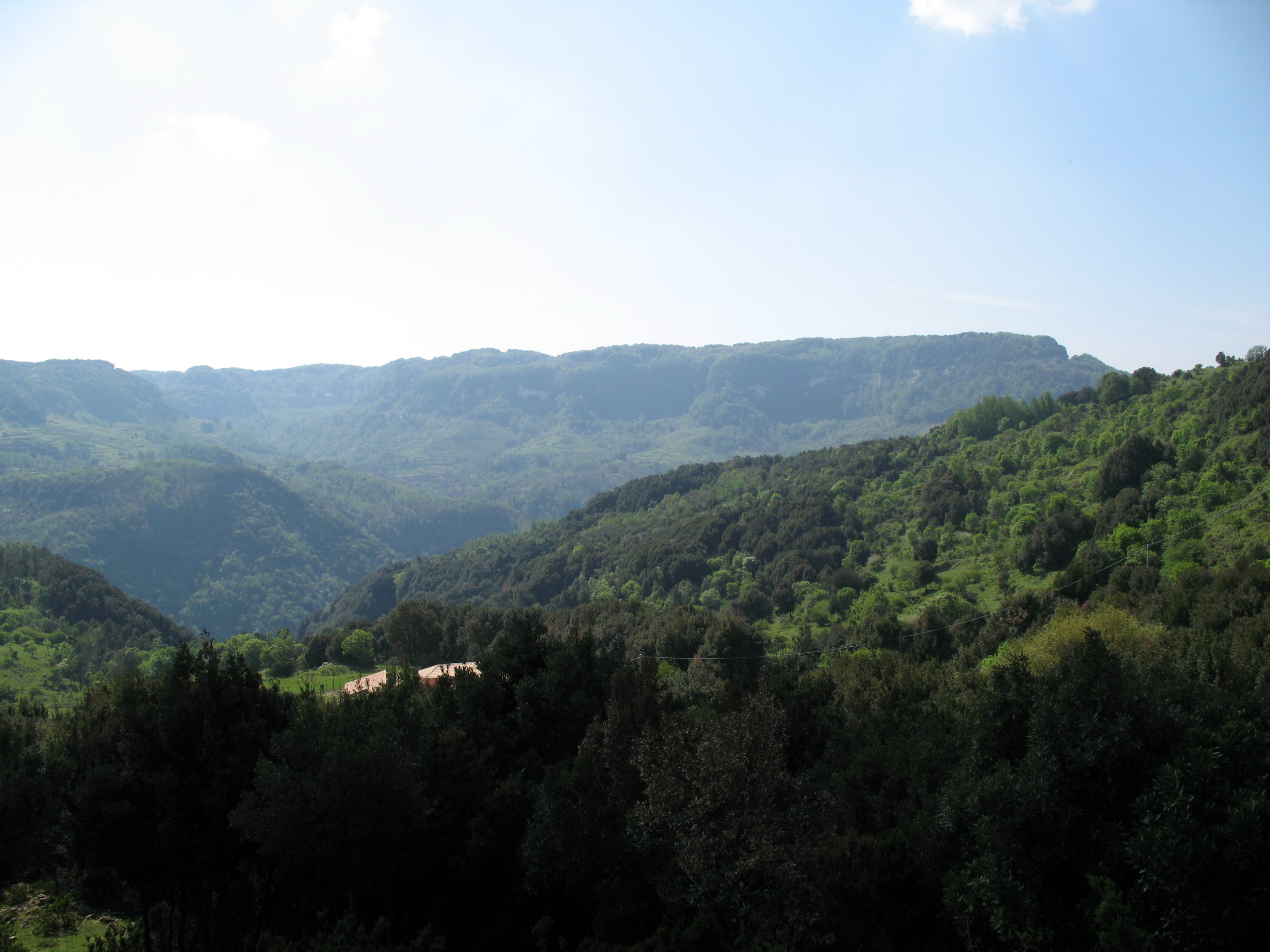
View of the Pass.

The Passo della Limina is a mountain pass in Calabria, southern Italy. It marks the natural boundary between the Aspromonte and the Serre Calabresi massifs. It has an altitude of 822 m.

It is popular for mountain hiking, as well as mountain biking.
