= Mongiana =

- Comune
- Comune di Mongiana
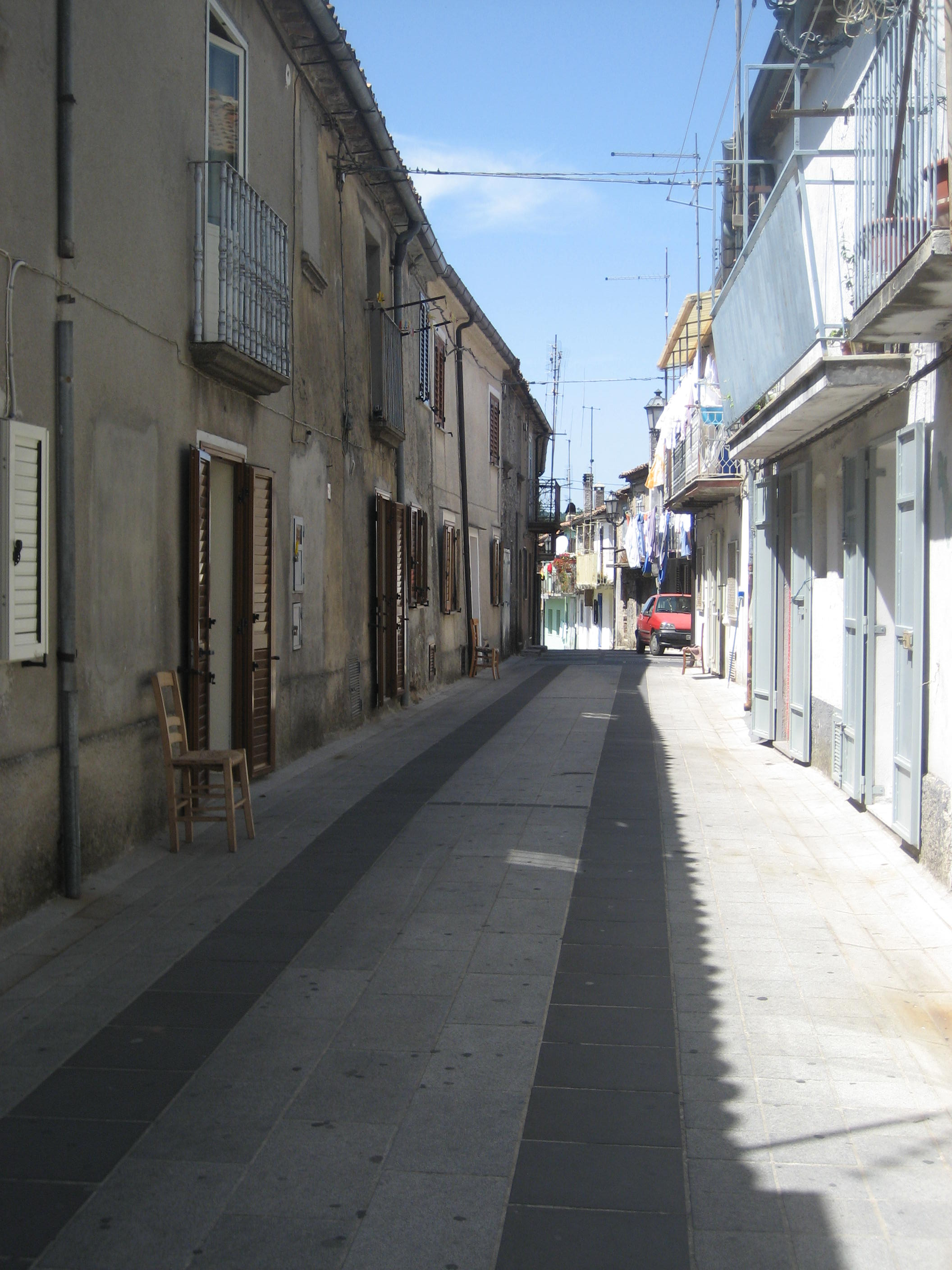

- Coat of arms

- Location within Italy Location within Calabria
- Coordinates: 38°31′N 16°19′E
- Country: Italy
- Region: Calabria
- Province: Vibo Valentia (VV)
- Frazioni: Santa Maria

Government
  - Mayor: Francesco Angilletta

Area
  - Total: 18.41 km^{2} (7.11 sq mi)
- Elevation: 921 m (3,022 ft)

Population (31 December 2018)
  - Total: 726
  - Density: 39.4/km^{2} (102/sq mi)
- Time zone: UTC+1 (CET)
  - Summer (DST): UTC+2 (CEST)
- Postal code: 89823
- Dialing code: 0963
- Website: Official website

Mongiana (Calabrian: Mungiana) is a comune (municipality) in the Province of Vibo Valentia in the Italian region Calabria, located about 50 kilometres (31 mi) southwest of Catanzaro and about 25 kilometres (16 mi) southeast of Vibo Valentia.

Mongiana was the seat of the main ironworks and foundries of the Kingdom of Two Sicilies. The Monte Pecoraro, a peak in the Serre Calabresi, is located in its territory.

== Climate ==
Climate data for Mongiana, elevation 885 m (2,904 ft), (1991-2020)
Month	Jan	Feb	Mar	Apr	May	Jun	Jul	Aug	Sep	Oct	Nov	Dec	Year
Mean daily maximum °C (°F)	8.0 (46.4)	8.7 (47.7)	11.2 (52.2)	14.1 (57.4)	18.6 (65.5)	22.9 (73.2)	25.2 (77.4)	25.9 (78.6)	21.5 (70.7)	17.8 (64.0)	13.0 (55.4)	8.9 (48.0)	16.3 (61.3)
Mean daily minimum °C (°F)	0.2 (32.4)	0.1 (32.2)	1.2 (34.2)	3.3 (37.9)	6.4 (43.5)	9.5 (49.1)	11.4 (52.5)	11.8 (53.2)	9.6 (49.3)	6.7 (44.1)	3.8 (38.8)	1.3 (34.3)	5.4 (41.7)
Average precipitation mm (inches)	238.2 (9.38)	202.3 (7.96)	172.1 (6.78)	123.3 (4.85)	81.4 (3.20)	50.1 (1.97)	34.7 (1.37)	47.5 (1.87)	109.6 (4.31)	152.1 (5.99)	224.1 (8.82)	261.5 (10.30)	1,696.8 (66.80)
Average precipitation days (≥ 1.0 mm)	14.7	14.3	12.5	10.1	6.9	5.0	4.0	4.7	9.4	9.8	13.3	15.4	120.0
Source: Istituto Superiore per la Protezione e la Ricerca Ambientale

== See also ==
- Reali ferriere ed Officine di Mongiana
