= Monte Pecoraro =

Mountain in Italy

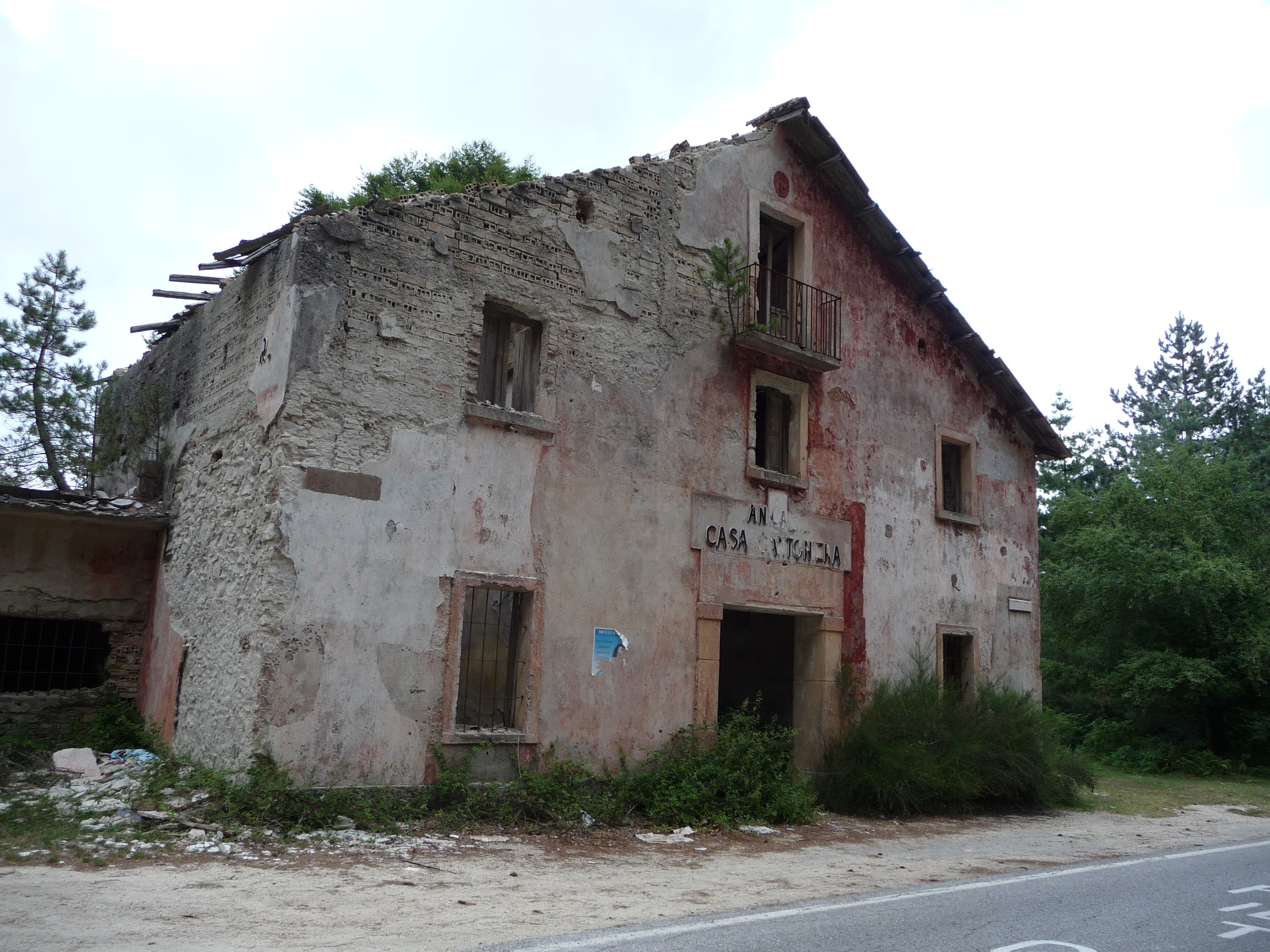
- An abandoned custom house at Monte Pecoraro.

Highest point
- Elevation: 1,423 m (4,669 ft)
- Coordinates: 38°18′52″N 16°12′14″E

Geography
- Location within Italy
- Location: Calabria, Italy
- Parent range: Serre Calabresi

Monte Pecoraro is a mountain in the Serre Calabresi, in southern Calabria, southern Italy. It has an elevation of 1,423 metres (4,669 ft).

It is located in the territory of Mongiana, in the province of Vibo Valentia.
