= Monterosso Calabro =

- Comune
- Comune di Monterosso Calabro
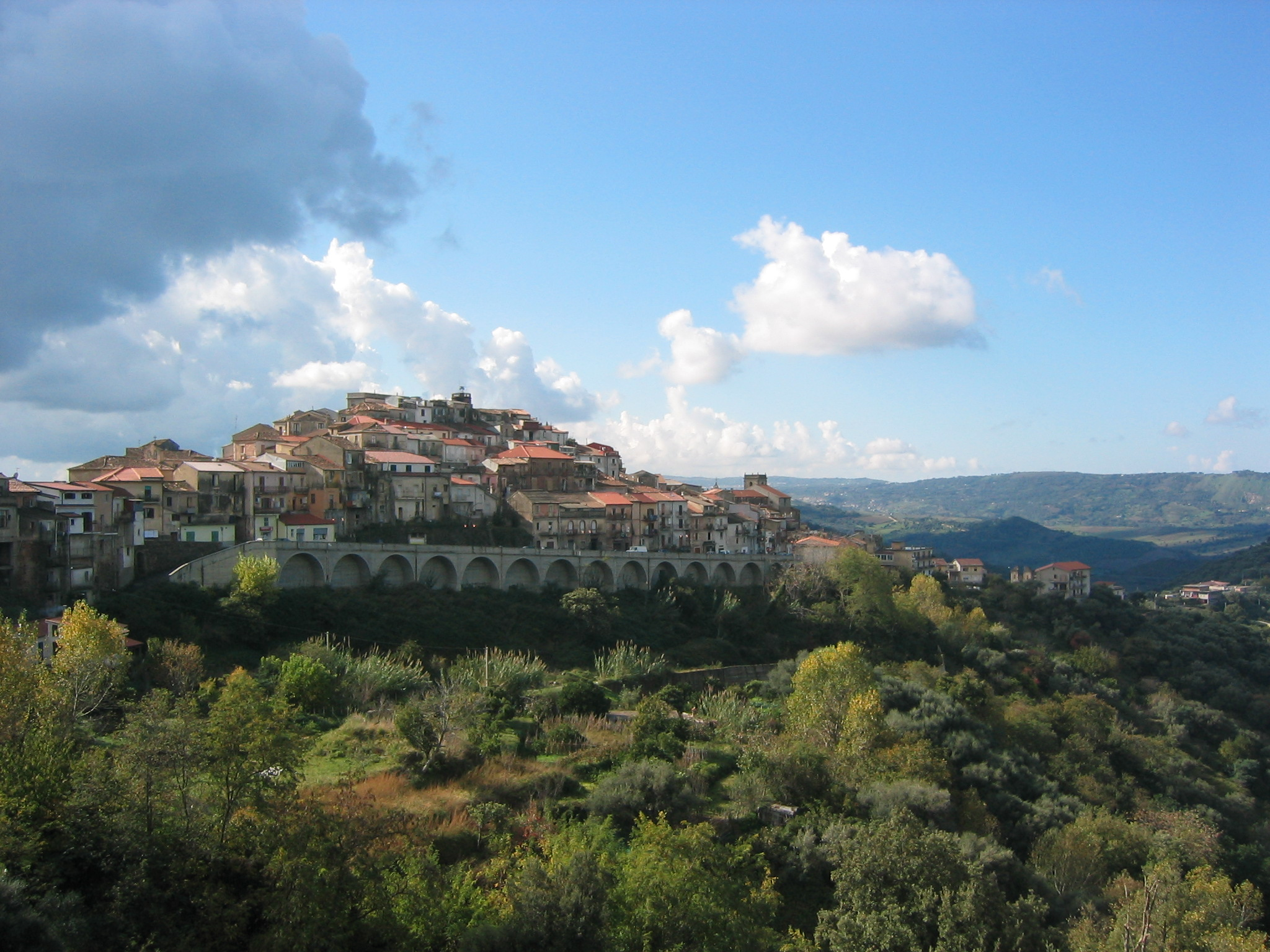

- Location within Italy Location within Calabria
- Coordinates: 38°43′N 16°17′E
- Country: Italy
- Region: Calabria
- Province: Province of Vibo Valentia (VV)

Area
  - Total: 18.2 km^{2} (7.0 sq mi)

Population (Dec. 2004)
  - Total: 1,927
  - Density: 106/km^{2} (274/sq mi)
- Demonym: MONTEROSSINI
- Time zone: UTC+1 (CET)
  - Summer (DST): UTC+2 (CEST)
- Postal code: 89819
- Dialing code: 0963

Monterosso Calabro is a comune (municipality) in the Province of Vibo Valentia in the Italian region of Calabria, located about 35 kilometres (22 mi) southwest of Catanzaro and about 20 kilometres (12 mi) northeast of Vibo Valentia. As of 31 December 2004, it had a population of 1,927 and an area of 18.2 square kilometres (7.0 mi^{2}).

Monterosso Calabro borders the following municipalities: Capistrano, Maierato, Polia.

== Demographic evolution ==
Historical population

Year	Pop.	±%
1861	2,467	—
1871	2,549	+3.3%
1881	2,522	−1.1%
1901	2,617	+3.8%
1911	3,017	+15.3%

Year	Pop.	±%
1921	3,185	+5.6%
1931	3,067	−3.7%
1936	3,079	+0.4%
1951	3,491	+13.4%
1961	3,223	−7.7%

Year	Pop.	±%
1971	2,584	−19.8%
1981	2,322	−10.1%
1991	2,227	−4.1%
2001	2,017	−9.4%

Source: Data from ISTAT
