= Polia, Calabria =

Polia Greek: Πόλις
- Comune
- Comune di Polia
- Location within Italy Location within Calabria
- Coordinates: 38°45′N 16°19′E
- Country: Italy
- Region: Calabria
- Province: Province of Vibo Valentia (VV)
- Frazioni: Lia, Trecroci, Poliolo, Cellia, Menniti

Area
  - Total: 31.8 km^{2} (12.3 sq mi)

Population (Dec. 2004)
  - Total: 1,224
  - Density: 38.5/km^{2} (99.7/sq mi)
- Time zone: UTC+1 (CET)
  - Summer (DST): UTC+2 (CEST)
- Postal code: 88027
- Dialing code: 0963

Polia (Calabrian: Pulìa; Greek: πόλις, romanized: polis, lit. 'city') is a comune (municipality) in the Province of Vibo Valentia in the Italian region of Calabria. It is located about 30 kilometres (19 mi) southwest of Catanzaro and about 20 kilometres (12 mi) northeast of Vibo Valentia. As of 31 December 2004, it had a population of 1,224 and an area of 31.8 square kilometres (12.3 mi^{2}).

Polia's origins date back to 5th|8th centuries BC when Greek pioneers coming from the Gulf of Squillace, located on the east coast of Calabria facing the Ionian Sea, decided to settle on a valley today known as Jammene (from Greek: iama-enes, fertile place) thus permitting to ease goods traffic between Greece and Rome through the Apennine Mountains.

Polia borders the following municipalities: Cenadi, Cortale, Filadelfia, Francavilla Angitola, Jacurso, Maierato, Monterosso Calabro and San Vito sullo Ionio.

== Demographic evolution ==
Historical population

Year	Pop.	±%
1861	2,521	—
1871	2,595	+2.9%
1881	2,644	+1.9%
1901	3,029	+14.6%
1911	3,272	+8.0%

Year	Pop.	±%
1921	3,472	+6.1%
1931	3,704	+6.7%
1936	3,746	+1.1%
1951	3,719	−0.7%
1961	2,798	−24.8%

Year	Pop.	±%
1971	2,046	−26.9%
1981	1,552	−24.1%
1991	1,512	−2.6%
2001	1,319	−12.8%
2011	1,048	−20.5%

Source: Data from ISTAT
