= Maierato =

Maierato Mierato (Greek)
- Comune
- Comune di Maierato
- Location within Italy Location within Calabria
- Coordinates: 38°42′N 16°12′E
- Country: Italy
- Region: Calabria
- Province: Province of Vibo Valentia (VV)

Area
  - Total: 39.9 km^{2} (15.4 sq mi)

Population (Dec. 2004)
  - Total: 2,305
  - Density: 57.8/km^{2} (150/sq mi)
- Demonym: Maieratani
- Time zone: UTC+1 (CET)
  - Summer (DST): UTC+2 (CEST)
- Postal code: 89843
- Dialing code: 0963

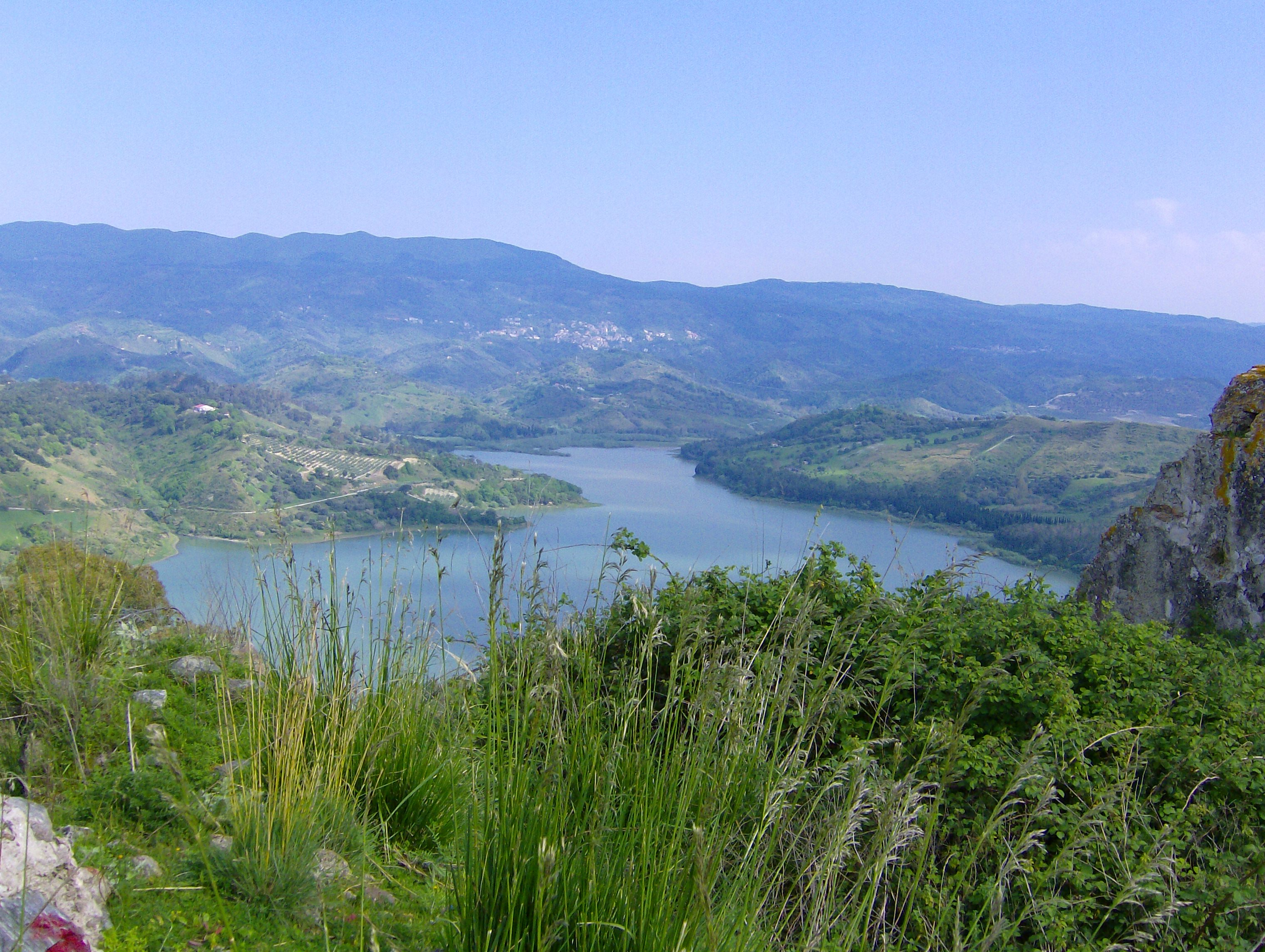

Maierato is a comune (municipality) in the Province of Vibo Valentia in the Italian region Calabria, located about 40 kilometres (25 mi) southwest of Catanzaro and about 11 kilometres (7 mi) northeast of Vibo Valentia. As of 31 December 2004, it had a population of 2,305 and an area of 39.9 square kilometres (15.4 mi^{2}).

Maierato borders the following municipalities: Capistrano, Filogaso, Francavilla Angitola, Monterosso Calabro, Pizzo, Polia, Sant'Onofrio.

== Demographic evolution ==
Historical population

Year	Pop.	±%
1861	2,111	—
1871	2,196	+4.0%
1881	2,369	+7.9%
1901	2,871	+21.2%
1911	3,222	+12.2%

Year	Pop.	±%
1921	3,004	−6.8%
1931	3,375	+12.4%
1936	3,647	+8.1%
1951	3,880	+6.4%
1961	3,663	−5.6%

Year	Pop.	±%
1971	3,020	−17.6%
1981	3,028	+0.3%
1991	3,111	+2.7%
2001	2,256	−27.5%

Source: Data from ISTAT

== 2010 landslide ==
In February 2010 a landslide occurred near Maierato which was filmed by an amateur cameraman, where the whole nearby hillside slid downwards. Some 200 people were evacuated from their homes. The incident was shown by the BBC.

== Maieratani in North America ==
Many Italians from the town of Maierato set sail for the American East Coast, in hope to find work to provide for their families, as Southern Italy had been quite impoverished at the time. Many Maieratani men came to the United States pre-world war II, but returned after the war to marry other Maieratani or to bring family to America. Most Maieratani settled in the Pittsburgh, Pennsylvania, area, and many became steel mill workers. Now, many Maieratani control government positions in the city.

The Maieratani that came to Canada mostly settled in the Golden Horseshoe area of southern Ontario, mainly in Toronto and the Greater Toronto Area. This group is very tight knit and even have a social club called "Maierato Club" with annual events such as the "Festa Di San Rocco".
