= Curinga =

- Comune
- Comune di Curinga
- Location within Italy Location within Calabria
- Coordinates: 38°49′40″N 16°18′45″E
- Country: Italy
- Region: Calabria
- Province: Catanzaro (CZ)
- Frazioni: Acconia

Area
  - Total: 51 km^{2} (20 sq mi)
- Elevation: 350 m (1,150 ft)

Population (2018-01-01)
  - Total: 6,719
  - Density: 130/km^{2} (340/sq mi)
- Time zone: UTC+1 (CET)
  - Summer (DST): UTC+2 (CEST)
- Website: Official website

Curinga (Calabrian: Cùrënga) is a town and comune in the province of Catanzaro, in the Calabria region of southern Italy. Curinga has a history spanning several thousand years. The entire municipal territory is in fact very rich in historical and archaeological evidence.

== History ==
=== Ancient Greek era ===
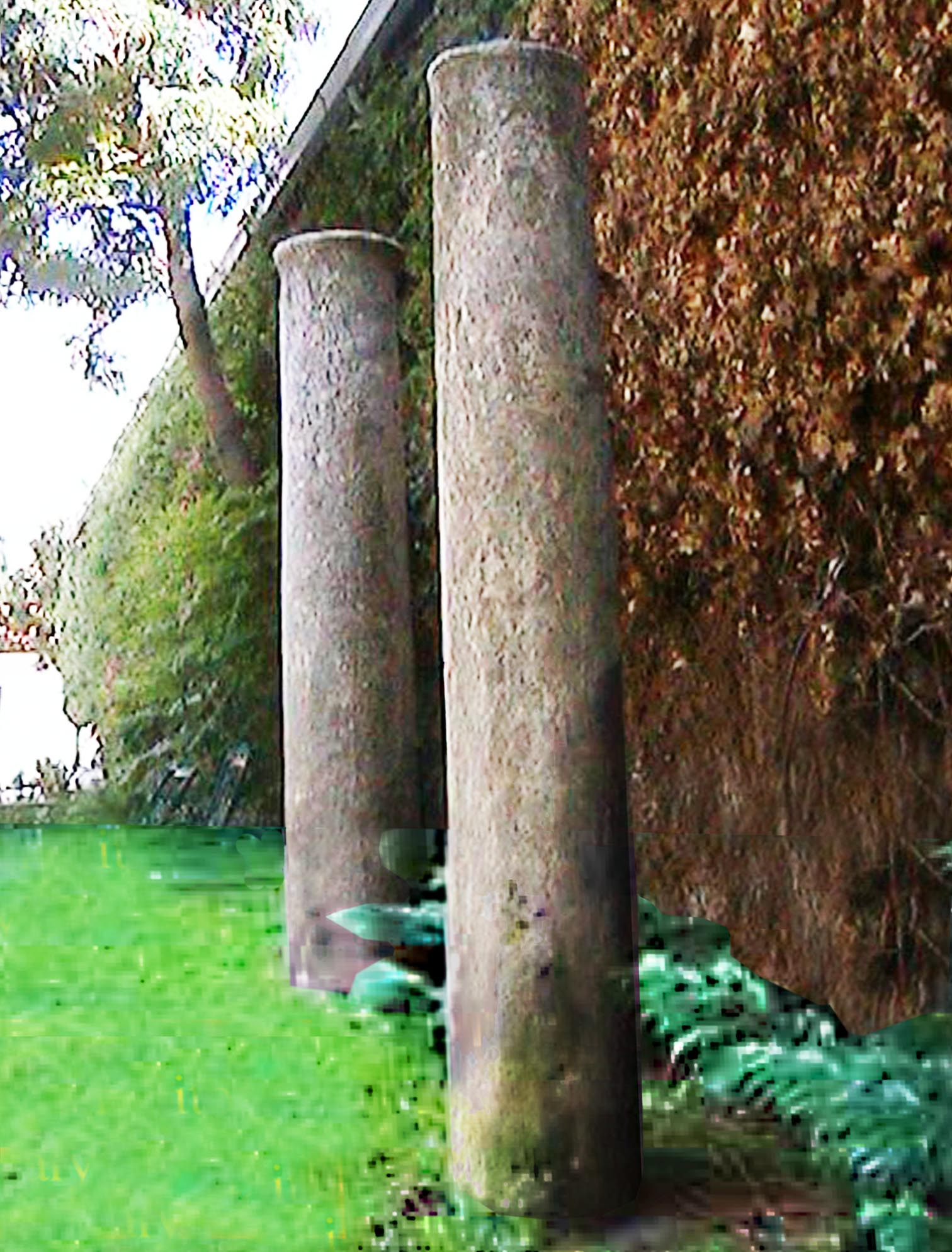
Columns of temple of the Greek Dioscuri Castor and Pollux

The area, halfway between the Greek cities of Hipponion (Vibo Valentia) and Temesa, was settled by ancient Achaean Greeks, the Curinga coast providing a convenient maritime port linked to routes towards the interior of the Amato and Angitola.

Acconia is the current name of the town, but in ancient times it was called Lacconia, Lanconia or Laconia.

The temple of Castor and Pollux (of which two of the four columns discovered are preserved in the garden of Villa Cefaly) was built by the Greeks who occupied this area and was subsequently incorporated by the Romans in the Baths.

In the Prato Sant'Irene district and in the vicinity of the Tre Calrini stream, a necropolis with late Hellenic furnishings was discovered. In 1916, during reclamation operations on the Turrino stream, a small treasure of around 300 archaic Greek staters (6th century BC) in silver and in good condition was found and immediately divided between the workers and the locals. The intervention of Paolo Orsi and the prefecture averted their total dispersion: 164 coins were recovered in Ravenna, 14 in Catanzaro, 11 in Pizzo, 4 in Curinga. Coming from the mints of the cities of Taranto, Crotone, Metaponto, Sibari, Caulonia, they are currently preserved in the National Museum of Magna Graecia in Reggio Calabria.

=== Roman era ===
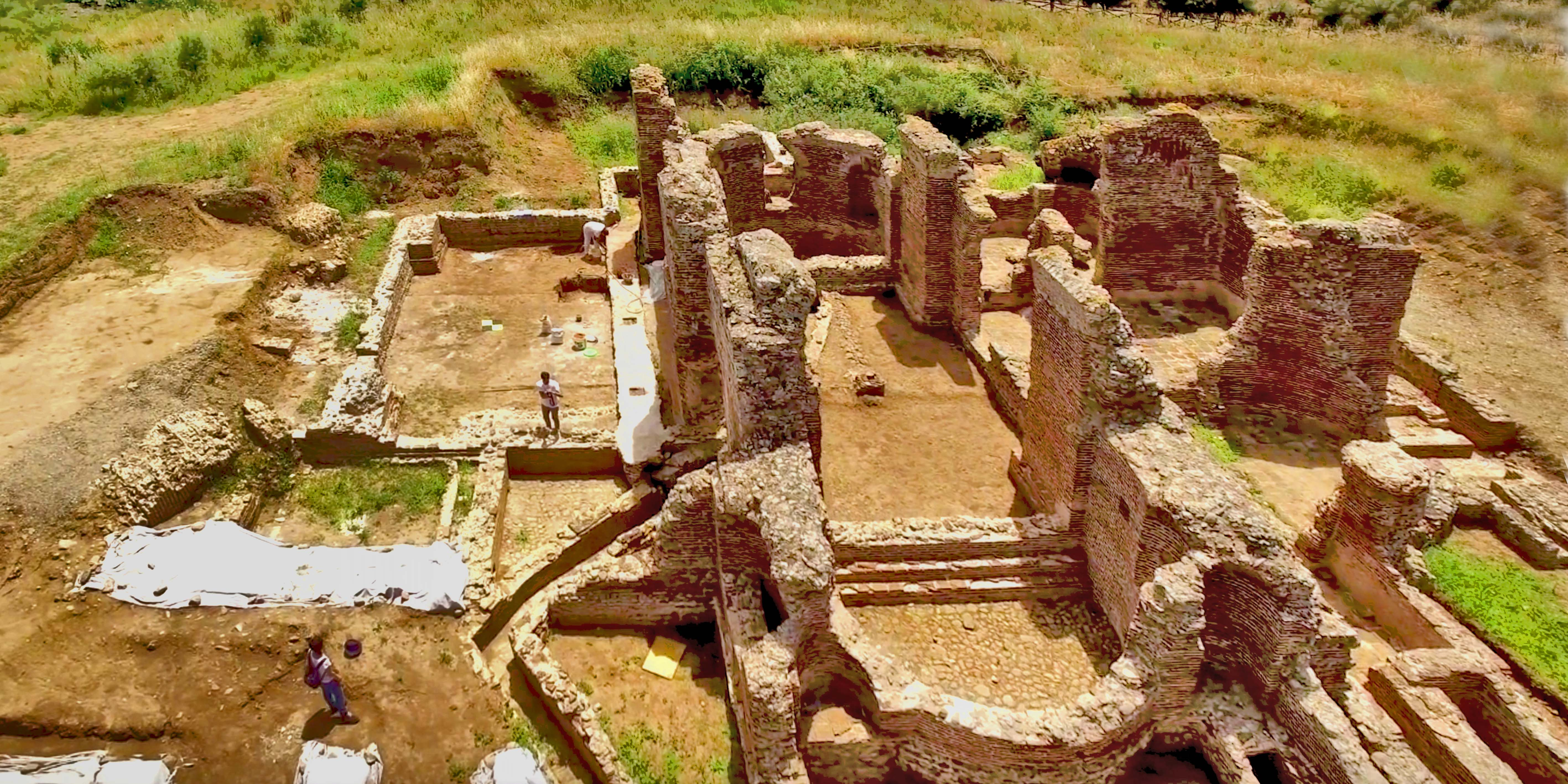
Baths at Acconia

The Romans built the Via Popilia crossing the territory from north to south, along which they founded post stations (statio) including that of Aque Ange (Anniae, possibly at Lamezia Terme) described in the Peutinger Table. The remains of the post station Ad Turres, also listed in the Roman itineraries is in the Trivio area near the Fondaco del Fico.

The large baths complex at Acconia dating to between the 1st and 2nd centuries AD shows the considerable importance of area at that time. They may have belonged to a large Roman villa. The discovery of a Diocletian bronze coin indicates it was still functioning around the 3rd-4th century.

A disaster, possibly an earthquake, destroyed the baths, evidence of which is a massive restoration characterised by opus vittatum wall facings involving practically all the walls and in some cases starting from the foundation, and the south-eastern calidarium was also added. They may have been converted for use of a statio at this time. A large cistern was added on the eastern side and another restoration in the 3rd-4th century, again in opus vittatum, consolidated the apse of the east calidarium which was re-clad with a curved wall with the praefurnium.

The baths became disused except for the frigidarium between the mid-4th and the beginning of the 5th century and were later transformed into a Gothic church.

== 1980 train crash ==
On November 21, 1980, a Rome-Syracuse passenger train hit the cars of a freight train from Catania, killing 20 people and injuring 112.
