= Serre Calabresi =

Italian mountain range

Coordinates: 38°18′52″N 16°12′14″E

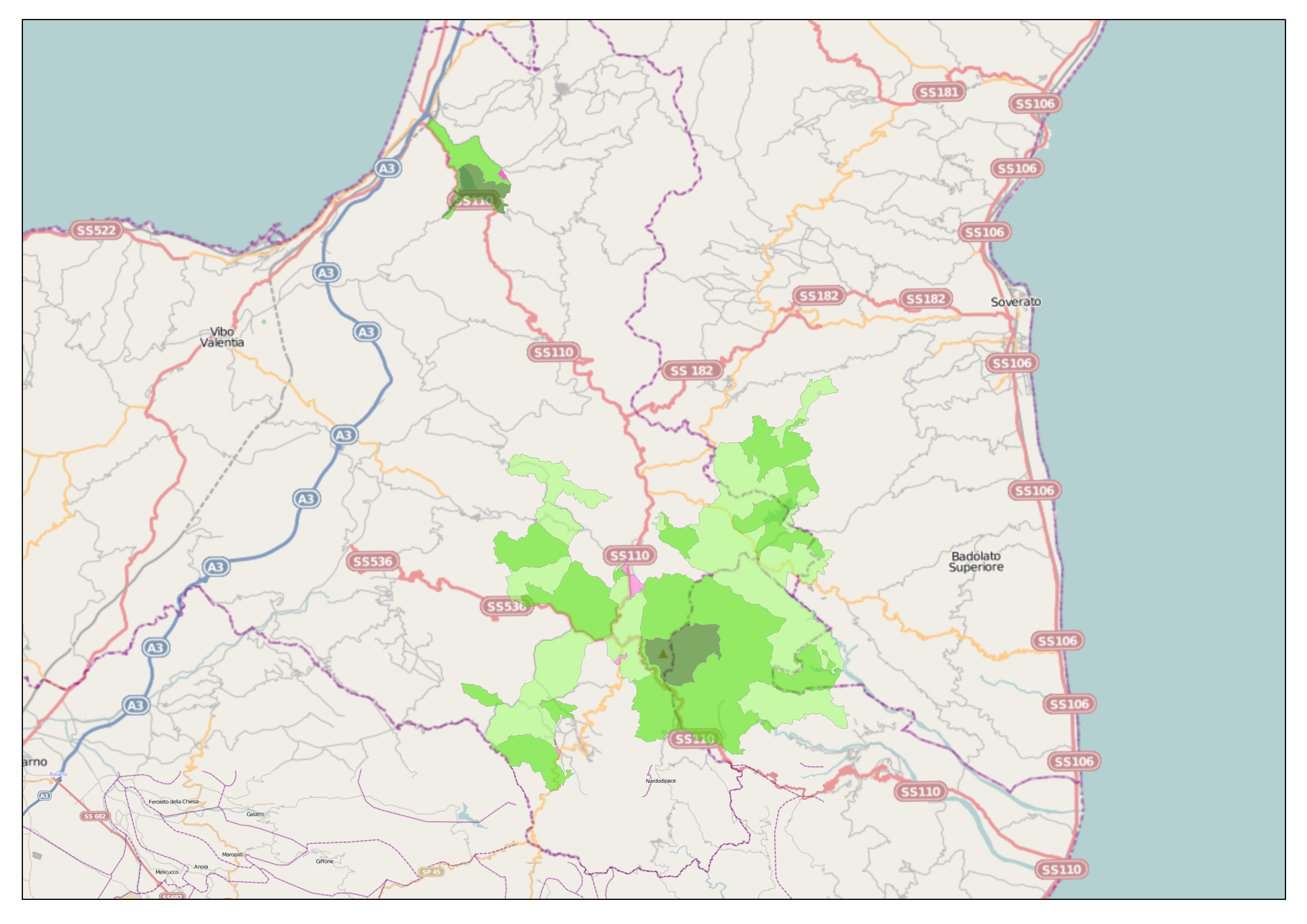
Park map

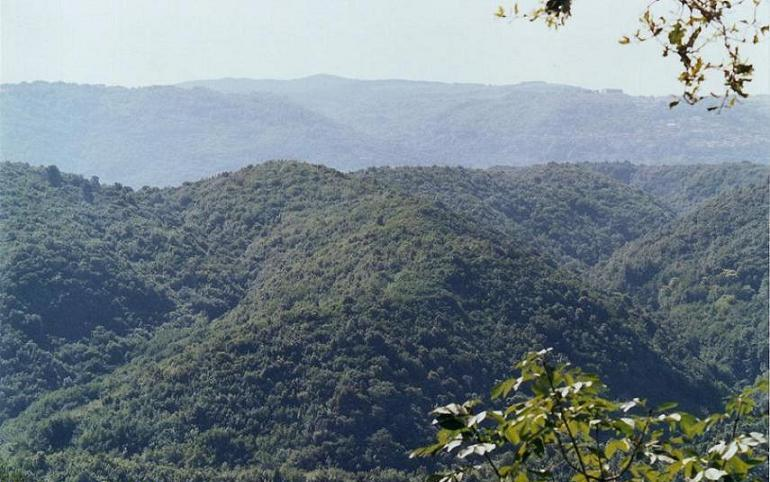
The Serre from Fallà.

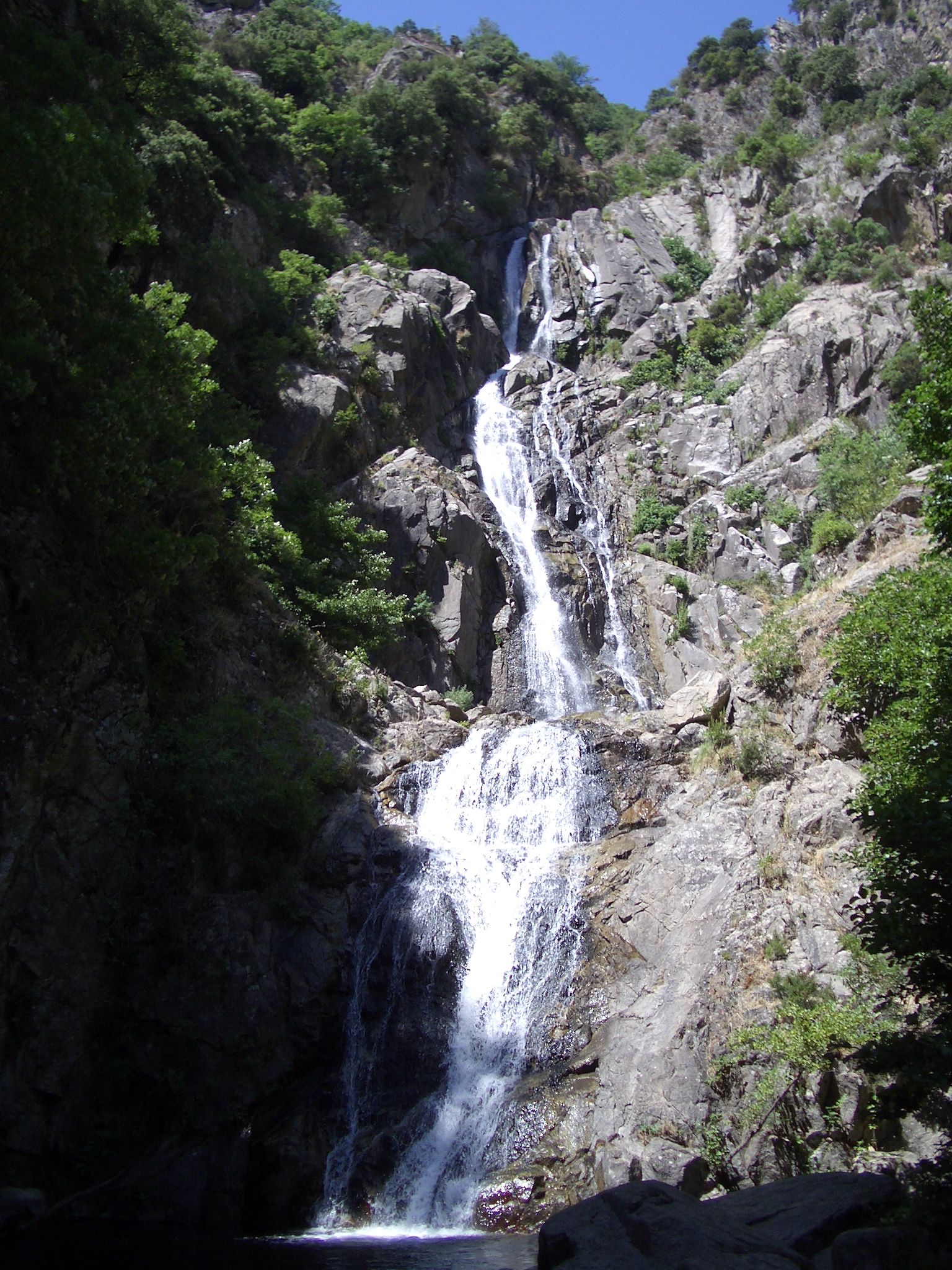
Cascata del Marmarico.

The Serre Calabresi or Calabrian Serre (Calabrian dialect: Serra) are a mountain and hill area of Calabria, southern Italy, characterized by large extents of woods.

The name could be derived by the Jewish Ser, meaning "mountains", or it could refer to the shape of a handsaw. The highest peak is the Monte Pecoraro, with an altitude of 1423 m.

== Geography and geology ==
The chain begins at the Passo della Limina and ends at Isthmus of Catanzaro, the narrowest in Italy (c. 30 km separating the Ionian Sea from the Tyrrhenian Sea). It is bounded by the Sila Range from the north and by the Aspromonte from the south.

Geologically, the Serre Calabresi are part of the so-called Calabrian Alps (it), and are mostly formed by graniti, porphyry and diorite. The eastern area also includes sandstone, while the Monte Mammicomito has instead a limestone-dolomite structure, characterized also by Karst topography. Badlands are also present.

== Fauna and vegetation ==
The fauna of the Serre has been depleted by human hunting. Recently, the Italian wolf has returned, probably from Sila.

Vegetation include Abies alba and Oak in the lowest slopes, while the Beech predominates over the 80 m of altitude.

== See also ==
- Natural regional park of Serre

== Sources ==
- Bevilacqua, Francesco. Il Parco delle Serre (Guida naturalistica ed escursionisitica). Rubbettino Editore.
