= February 24 (Eastern Orthodox liturgics) =

Day in the Eastern Orthodox liturgical calendar

Eastern Orthodox liturgical calendar
February 23	February 24	February 25
February 24 O.S. ≍ March 9 (or March 8 (Note: in a leap year)) N.S. February 24 N.S ≍ February 11 O.S.

An Eastern Orthodox cross

February 24 in Eastern Orthodox liturgical calendars is a feast day and a day of commemoration of saints and martyrs. Although some Orthodox churches use the Revised Julian Calendar and others use the traditional Julian calendar, the fixed commemorations for their respective February 24 are broadly the same, no matter which calendar is used. (Note: Despite the dates being the same, the days to which they refer typically differ by 13 days. The notation Old Style or O.S. is sometimes used to indicate a date in the traditional Julian Calendar (the "Old Calendar"). The notation New Style or N.S. indicates a date in the Revised Julian calendar (the "New Calendar").)

== Feast ==
- First (4th century) and Second (452) Findings of the Precious Head of St. John the Baptist. (Note: "At Jerusalem, the first finding of the head of our Lord's Precursor.")

== Saints ==
- Saint John the Harvester (Theristos), of Calabria (9th century) (Note: Of Calabrian parentage, he was born in Sicily, where his mother had been taken as a slave by the Saracens. He managed to escape to Calabria while still a child and there became a monk. Theristos, meaning harvester, refers to a miraculous harvest reaped by the saint. In December 1994, the Regional Council of Calabria unanimously declared the Byzantine area located between the rivers Stilaro and Aces sacred, in order to allow for the re-establishment of Orthodox monasticism. Thus the Monastery of San Giovanni Theristis was founded. On 24 February 1995, the City of Bivongi officially handed over the Monastery to the Greek Orthodox Archdiocese of Italy, thus contributing to the restoration of the ancient ties made between monasticism on Athos and Italo-Greek monasticism. From 1994 until mid-2008 Greek-Orthodox monks from Mount Athos, Greece were living in the monastery praying, studying and working. In July 2008, the city council took the monastery from the Ecumenical Patriarchate. Currently the monks residing there are of the Patriarchate of Romania.)

== Pre-Schism Western saints ==
- Martyrs Montanus, Lucias, Julian, Victoricus, Flavian, and their companions, at Carthage (259) (Note: A group of ten martyrs in North Africa, disciples of St Cyprian of Carthage, who suffered in that city under Valerian. The story of their imprisonment was told by themselves and that of their martyrdom by eyewitnesses.) (Note: "In Africa, the holy martyrs Montanus, Lucius, Julian, Victoricus, Flavian, and their companions. They were disciples of St. Cyprian, and suffered martyrdom under the emperor Valerian.")
- Saint Primitiva (Primitivus), an early martyr, probably in Rome.
- Saint Modestus, Bishop of Trier in Germany and Confessor (489) (Note: His relics are venerated in the church of St Matthias in Trier.)
- Saint Praetextatus (Prix), Bishop of Rouen in France and Martyr (586) (Note: Bishop of Rouen in France (550-586). For his courage in denouncing the wicked, he was cruelly persecuted and exiled. Recalled seven years later, he was martyred on Easter Sunday in his own church.)
- Saint Liudhard (Letard), Chaplain and Bishop of Queen Bertha of Kent (c. 600) (Note: He may have played an important part in the conversion of King Ethelbert, preparing for the conversion of Kent.)
- Saint Æthelberht of Kent, King of Kent (616) (Note: "In England, St. Ethelbert, king of Kent, converted to the faith of Christ by St. Augustine, bishop of the English.") (Note: "At Canterbury, the deposition of ST. ETHELBERT, Confessor, King of Kent, disciple of St. Augustine, and the first Christian Prince of the English nation.") (see also: February 25)
- Saint Boisil of Melrose Abbey (664) (see also: February 23)
- Saint Cummain Ailbe (Cumine the White), Abbot of Iona (669)
- Saint Betto, a monk at Sainte Colombe in Sens in France, who became Bishop of Auxerre in 889 (918)

== Post-Schism Orthodox saints ==
- Venerable Erasmus of the Kiev Caves Monastery (c. 1160)
- Saint John Domovsky, Archpriest in Rostov-on-Don, a confessor of Orthodoxy who firmly denounced the Renovationists (1930) (Note: On July 24, 2025, by the decision of the Holy Synod of the Russian Orthodox Church (Journal No 68), Archpriest Ioann Alekseevich Domovsky was canonized as a saint in the rank of righteous for local veneration in the Don Metropolia. The Synod decided to commemorate Righteous John, Presbyter of Rostov, on February 24 / March 9 on the day of his repose, and on August 27 / September 9 on the day of the reburial of his remains in 2020. The official communiqué of the Moscow Patriarchate was as follows: (in Russian) "ПОСТАНОВИЛИ: 1. Причислить к лику святых в чине праведных для местного почитания в Донской митрополии протоиерея Иоанна Домовского.; 2. Память праведного Иоанна, пресвитера Ростовского, совершать 24 февраля / 9 марта в день его кончины и 27 августа / 9 сентября в день перезахоронения его останков в 2020 году.; 3. Честные останки праведного Иоанна, в случае их обретения, считать святыми мощами и воздавать им достодолжное почитание.; 4. Писать новопрославленному святому иконы для поклонения, согласно определению VII Вселенского Собора.)
- Venerable Saint Petroniu (Tănase) of Prodromu Skete, of the Great Lavra Monastery, Mount Athos (2011) (Note: He was glorified by the Ecumenical Patriarchate on August 31, 2025. The official communiqué of the Ecumenical Patriarchate was as follows: (in Greek) "Ἐπίσης ἀπεφάσισεν ὁμοφώνως, εἰσηγήσει τῆς Κανονικῆς Ἐπιτροπῆς, τήν κατάταξιν εἰς τό ἁγιολόγιον τῆς Ἐκκλησίας τῶν ἐν Ἄθωνι ἀσκησάντων ὁσιακῆς βιοτῆς Διονυσίου Βατοπαιδινοῦ, τοῦ ἐν τῷ Ἱερῷ Κελλίῳ Ἁγίου Γεωργίου Κολιτσοῦ, καί Πετρωνίου Ἱερομονάχου, Δικαίου τῆς Ἱερᾶς Σκήτης Τιμίου Προδρόμου, τῆς Ἱερᾶς Μονῆς Μεγίστης Λαύρας, τῆς μνήμης αὐτῶν τελουμένης τοῦ μέν πρώτου, τῇ 11ῃ Μαΐου, τοῦ δέ δευτέρου, τῇ 24ῃ Φεβρουαρίου ἑκάστου ἔτους.") (Note: See: (in Romanian) Petroniu Tănase. Wikipedia. (Romanian Wikipedia).)

== Other commemorations ==
- Uncovering of the relics (1486) of St. Romanus, Prince of Uglich (1285)

== Icon gallery ==
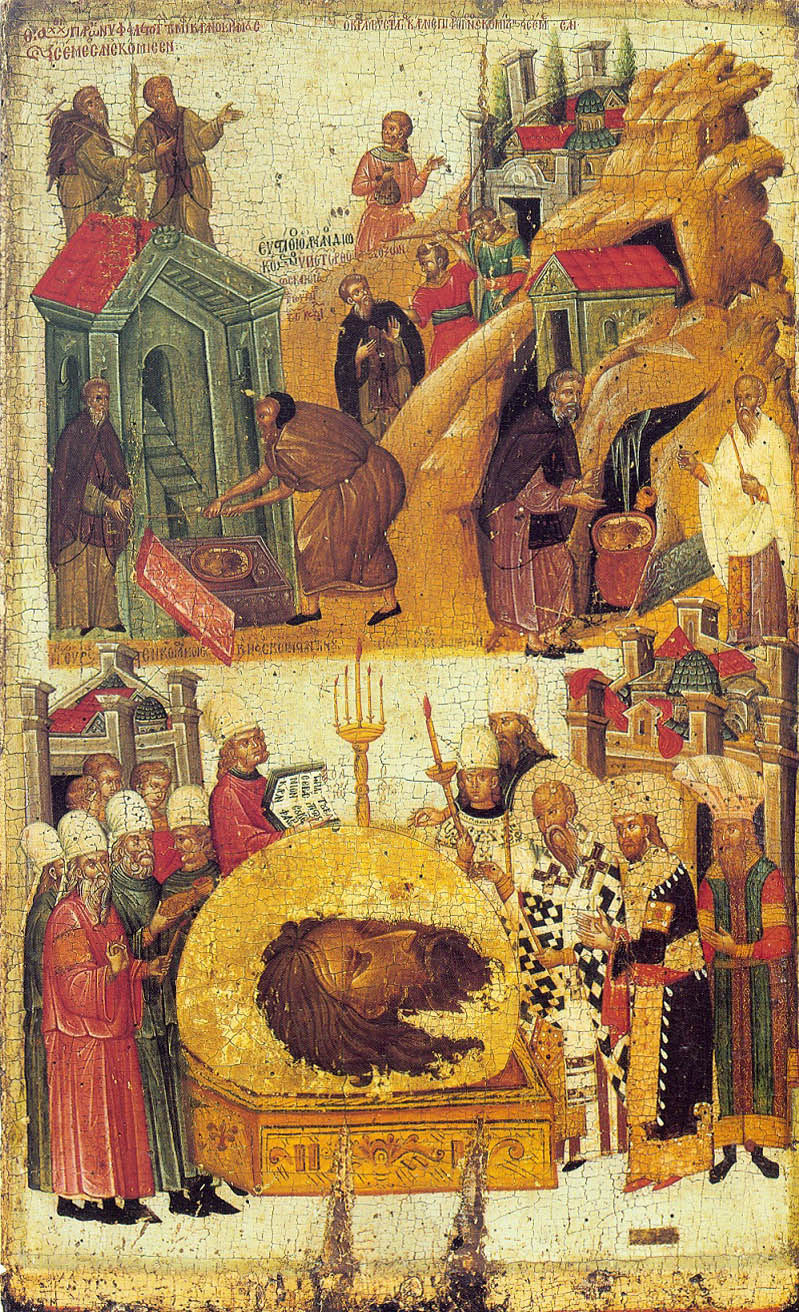
Findings of John the Baptist's head

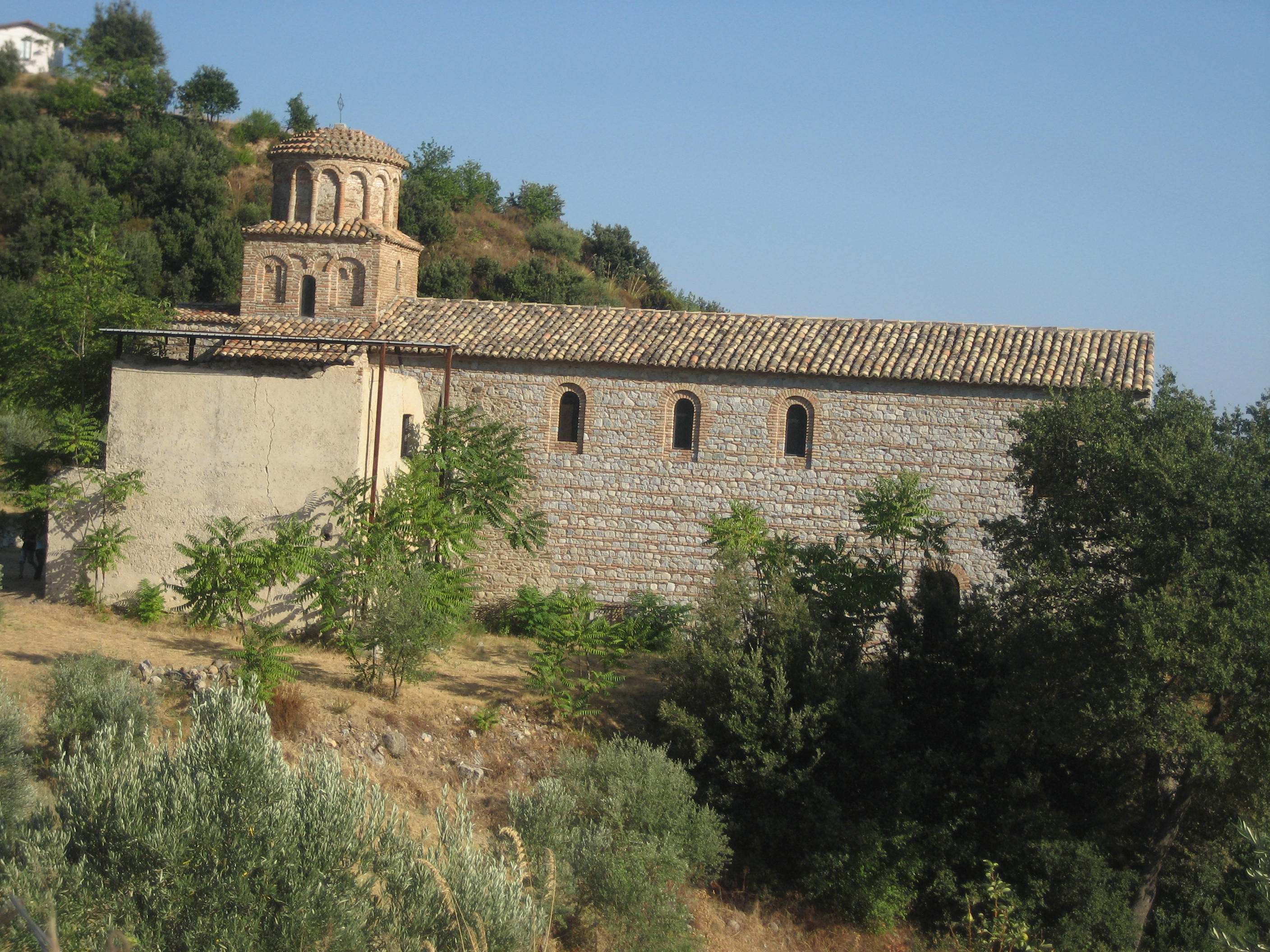
Monastery of Saint John Theristus, Bivongi, province of Reggio Calabria, Italy.

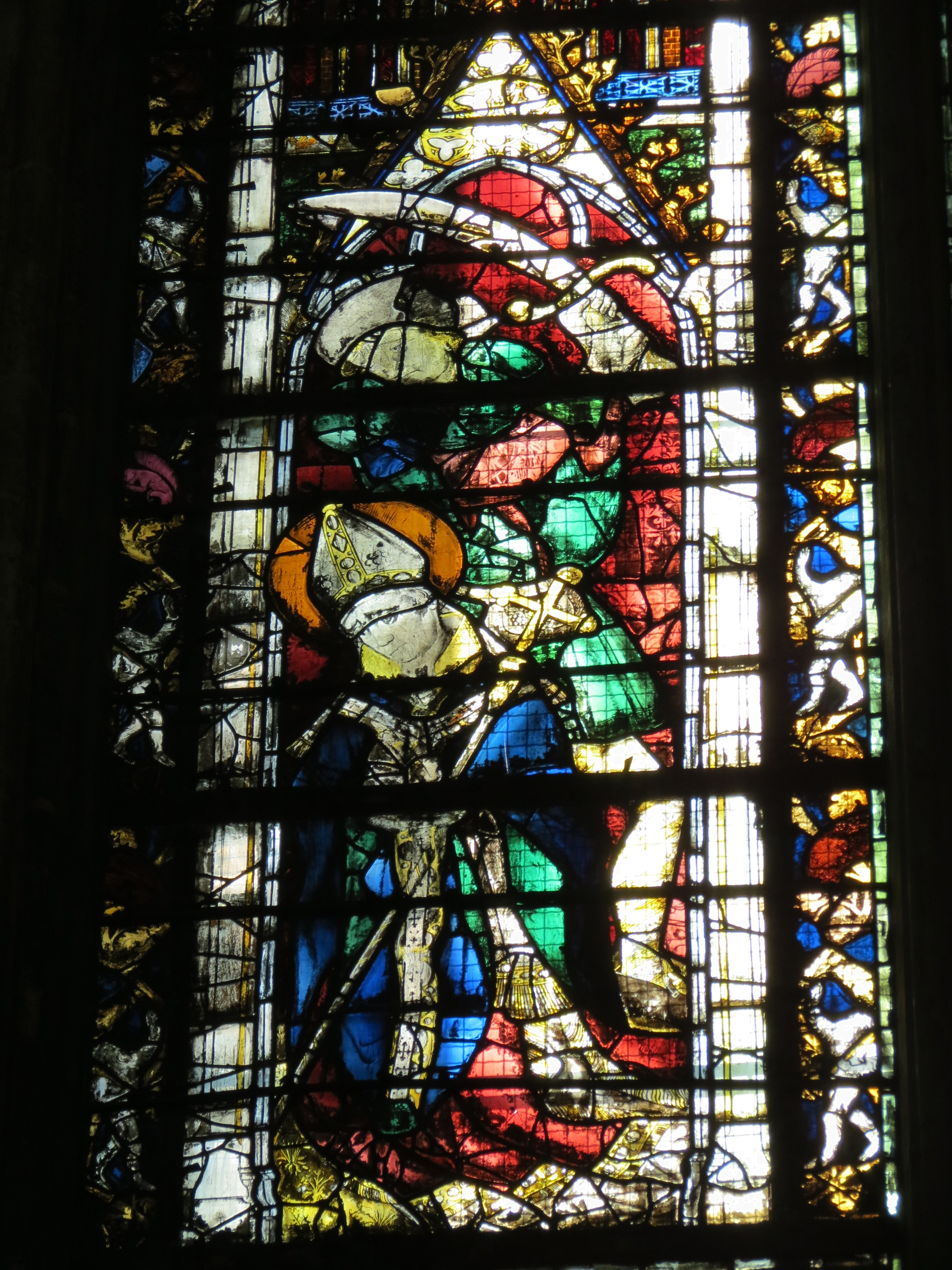
Saint Praetextatus (Prix).

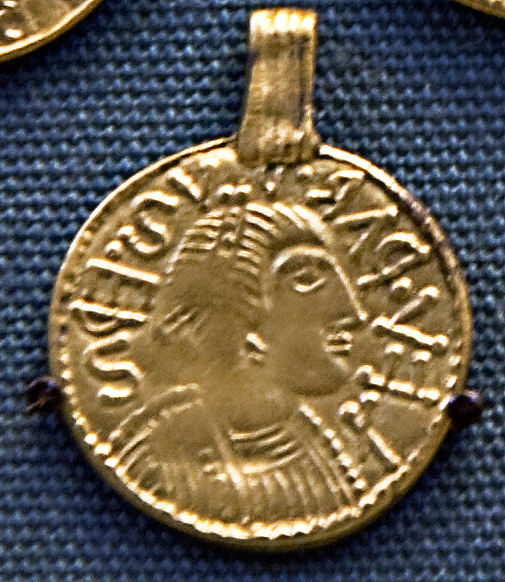
Replica of the Liudhard medalet, which depicts Liudhard.

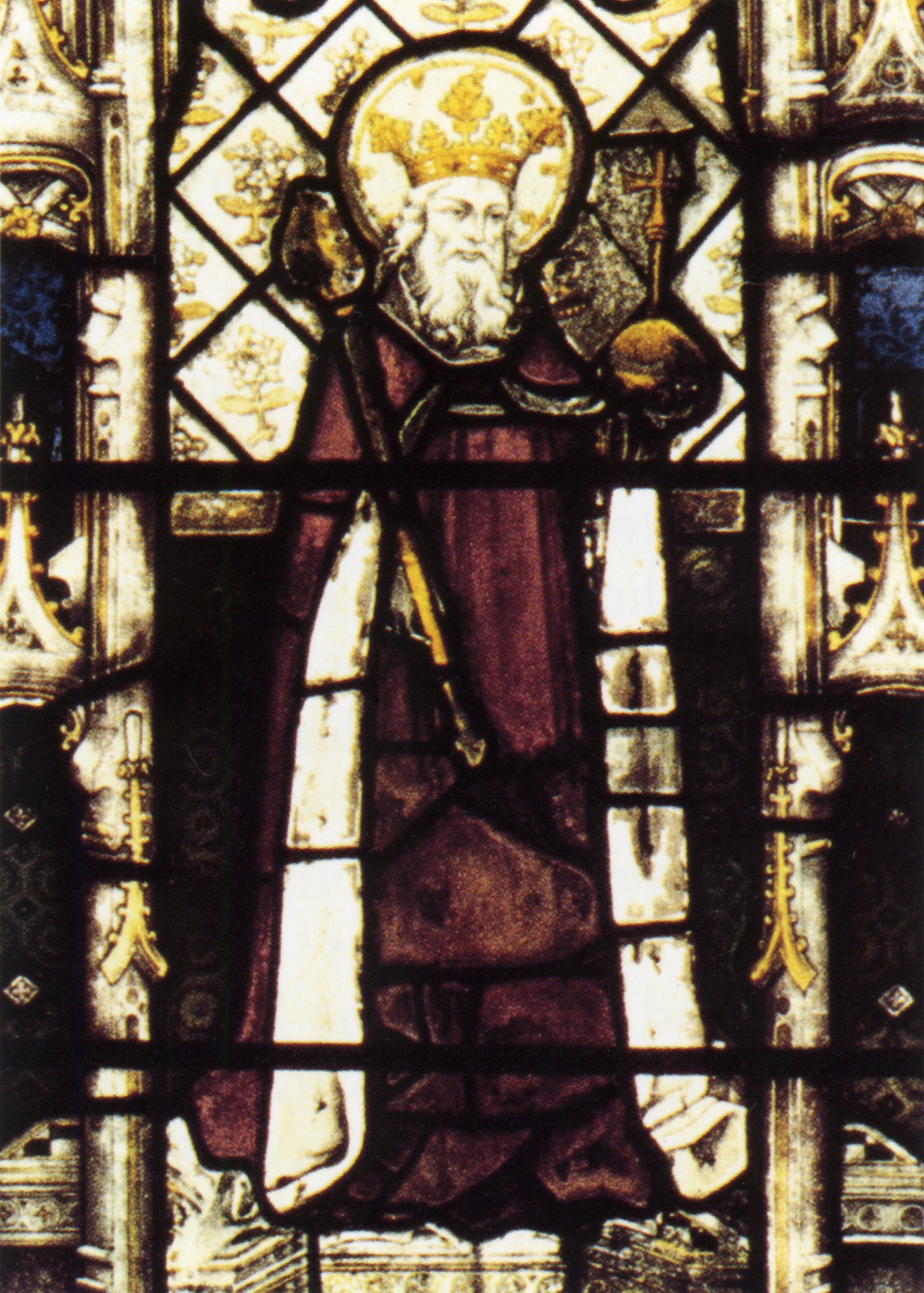
St. Æthelberht of Kent
(All Souls College Chapel, Oxford).

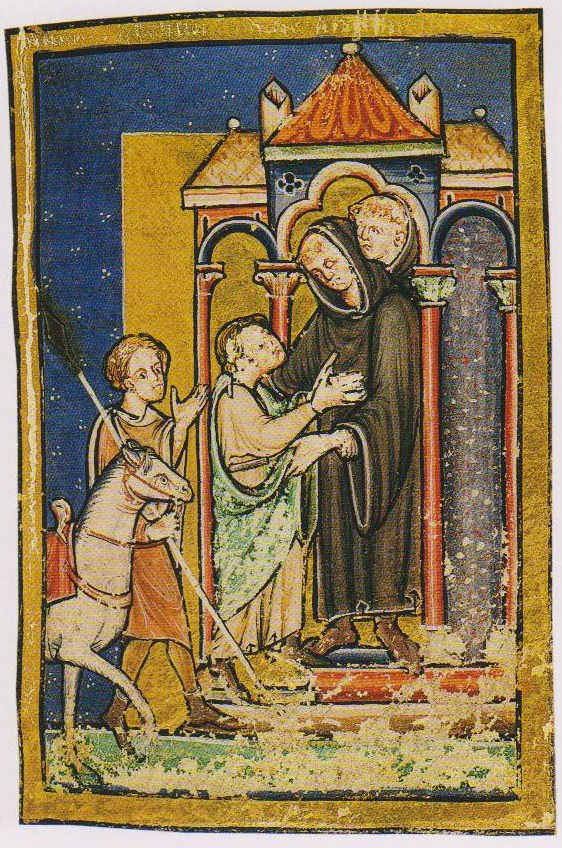
St. Boisil greets St. Cuthbert at Melrose Abbey.

== Sources ==
- February 24 / March 9. Orthodox Calendar (PRAVOSLAVIE.RU).
- March 9 / February 24. Holy Trinity Russian Orthodox Church (A parish of the Patriarchate of Moscow).
- February 24. OCA - The Lives of the Saints.
- The Autonomous Orthodox Metropolia of Western Europe and the Americas (ROCOR). St. Hilarion Calendar of Saints for the year of our Lord 2004. St. Hilarion Press (Austin, TX). p. 17.
- The Twenty-Fourth Day of the Month of February. Orthodoxy in China.
- February 24. Latin Saints of the Orthodox Patriarchate of Rome.
- The Roman Martyrology. Transl. by the Archbishop of Baltimore. Last Edition, According to the Copy Printed at Rome in 1914. Revised Edition, with the Imprimatur of His Eminence Cardinal Gibbons. Baltimore: John Murphy Company, 1916. pp. 57-58.
- Rev. Richard Stanton. A Menology of England and Wales, or, Brief Memorials of the Ancient British and English Saints Arranged According to the Calendar, Together with the Martyrs of the 16th and 17th Centuries. London: Burns & Oates, 1892. p. 83-84.

Greek Sources

- Great Synaxaristes: (in Greek) 24 ΦΕΒΡΟΥΑΡΙΟΥ. ΜΕΓΑΣ ΣΥΝΑΞΑΡΙΣΤΗΣ.
- (in Greek) Συναξαριστής. 24 Φεβρουαρίου. ECCLESIA.GR. (H ΕΚΚΛΗΣΙΑ ΤΗΣ ΕΛΛΑΔΟΣ).

Russian Sources

- (in Russian) 9 марта (24 февраля). Православная Энциклопедия под редакцией Патриарха Московского и всея Руси Кирилла (электронная версия). (Orthodox Encyclopedia - Pravenc.ru).
- (in Russian) 24 февраля (ст.ст.) 9 марта 2014 (нов. ст.). Русская Православная Церковь Отдел внешних церковных связей. (DECR).
