= February 23 (Eastern Orthodox liturgics) =

Day in the Eastern Orthodox liturgical calendar

Eastern Orthodox liturgical calendar
February 22	February 23	February 24
February 23 O.S. ≍ March 8 (or March 7 (Note: in a leap year)) N.S. February 23 N.S ≍ February 10 O.S.

An Eastern Orthodox cross

February 23 in Eastern Orthodox liturgical calendars is a feast day and a day of commemoration of saints and martyrs. Although some Orthodox churches use the Revised Julian Calendar and others use the traditional Julian calendar, the fixed commemorations for their respective February 23 are broadly the same, no matter which calendar is used. (Note: Despite the dates being the same, the days to which they refer typically differ by 13 days. The notation Old Style or O.S. is sometimes used to indicate a date in the traditional Julian Calendar (the "Old Calendar"). The notation New Style or N.S. indicates a date in the Revised Julian calendar (the "New Calendar").)

== Saints ==
- Hieromartyr Polycarp of Smyrna, Bishop of Smyrna (167) (Note: Name days celebrated today include: Polycarp (Πολύκαρπος).)
- Holy 73 Martyrs of Sirmium, under Diocletian (303) (Note: "At Sirmium, St. Sirenus, monk and martyr. By order of the emperor Maximian, he was arrested and beheaded, for confessing that he was a Christian. In the same place, the birthday of seventy-two holy martyrs, who ended the combat of martyrdom in that city, and took possession of the everlasting kingdom.")
- Martyr Clement, by the sword.
- Martyr Thea, by the sword.
- Venerable Gorgonia the Righteous (370), sister of St. Gregory the Theologian. (Note: Gregory the Theologian eulogized Saint Gorgonia as "The Diamond of Her Sex".)
- Saint Alexander, founder of the Monastery of the Unsleeping Ones, Constantinople (430) (see also: January 15, July 3)
- Saints John, Antioch, Antoninus, Moses, Zebinas, Polychronius, Moses (another), and Damian, ascetics near Cyrrhus in the Syrian desert (5th century) (Note: Name days celebrated today include: Polychronius (Πολυχρόνιος); Polychronia (Πολυχρονία).)

== Pre-Schism Western saints ==
- Saint Martha, a virgin-martyr beheaded in Astorga in Spain under Decius (251) (Note: "In the city of Astorga, St. Martha, virgin and martyr, under the emperor Decius, and the proconsul Paternus." Her relics are enshrined at Ribas de Sil and Ters.)
- Saint Polycarp, a priest in Rome noted for ministering to those in prison for their faith (c. 300) (Note: "At Rome, St. Polycarp, priest, who with blessed Sebastian converted many to the faith of Christ, and by his exhortations led them to the glory of martyrdom.")
- Saint Serenus the Gardener, martyr (307)
- Saint Romana (Romina), a virgin born in Rome who reposed at the age of eighteen while living as an anchoress in a cave on the banks of the Tiber in Italy (324) (Note: "At Todi, St. Romana, virgin, who was baptized by pope St. Sylvester. She led a heavenly life in caves and dens, and wrought glorious miracles.").
- Saints Syncrotas, Antigonus, Rutilus, Libius, Senerotas and Rogatianus, martyrs at Sirmium in Pannonia (4th century)
- Saint Florentius of Seville, Confessor, a saint much venerated in Seville in Spain (c. 485)
- Saint Felix of Brescia, twentieth Bishop of Brescia (c. 650) (Note: He was bishop for over forty years during which time he was occupied in fighting Arianism and other heresies.)
- Saint Jurmin, an East Anglian prince, son or nephew of King Anna of East Anglia (653) (Note: His relics were enshrined at Bury St Edmunds in England.)
- Saint Boswell (Boisil), Abbot of Melrose Abbey in Scotland (c. 661) (Note: Saints Cuthbert and Egbert were among his monks. Both admired him greatly, as did St Bede. His favourite reading was the Gospel of St John.) (see also: February 24)
- Saint Mildburga (Milburgh), Abbess of Wenlock Priory (715) (Note: The elder sister of St Mildred of Minster-in-Thanet in England, and the second Abbess of Wenlock. Archbishop Theodore consecrated her as a nun. She had the gift of miracles and healing of the blind and lepers, as well as power over birds and the natural world.)
- Saint Medrald (Mérald, Méraut), a monk at Saint-Evroult (Ebrulfus) of Ouche in France, who later became Abbot of Vendôme (c. 850)
- Saint Willigis, Archbishop of Mainz (1011) (Note: The son of a wheelwright, he became a priest at Hildesheim in Germany. Two years later he became Archbishop of Mainz. Although a statesman, Willigis was first and foremost a churchman and always remained humble and charitable to others.)
- Peter Damian, Bishop, Confessor, and Doctor (d. 1072).
- Saint John Theristes ("the Harvester") of Stylos in Calabria (d. 1129) (Note: Of Calabrian parentage, he was born in Sicily, where his mother had been taken as a slave by the Saracens. He managed to escape to Calabria while still a child and there became a monk. Theristos, meaning harvester, refers to a miraculous harvest reaped by the saint. In December 1994, the Regional Council of Calabria unanimously declared the Byzantine area located between the rivers Stilaro and Aces sacred, in order to allow for the re-establishment of Orthodox monasticism. Thus the Monastery of San Giovanni Theristis was founded. On 24 February 1995, the City of Bivongi officially handed over the Monastery to the Greek Orthodox Archdiocese of Italy, thus contributing to the restoration of the ancient ties made between monasticism on Athos and Italo-Greek monasticism. From 1994 until mid-2008 Greek-Orthodox monks from Mount Athos, Greece were living in the monastery praying, studying and working. In July 2008, the city council took the monastery from the Ecumenical Patriarchate. Currently the monks residing there are of the Patriarchate of Romania.) (Note: The Roman Martyrology (1916 English edition) has the following entry under June 24: "At Stilo, in Calabria, St. John, surnamed Therestus, distinguished for his fidelity to the monastic rule, and for his sanctity.") (see also: February 24 )

== Post-Schism Orthodox saints ==
- Venerable Damian of Esphigmenou Monastery, on Mount Athos (1280)
- Saint Cosmas of Zograf Monastery, Mount Athos (1281)
- Saint Moses of White Lake Monastery, monk (1480)
- New Monk-martyr Damian of Philotheou and Kissavos, at Larissa (1586)
- New Hieromartyr Lazarus of the Peloponnese (c. 1618)
- Venerable Polycarp of Bryansk, monk of Bryansk (1620-1621) (Note: See: (in Russian) Поликарп Брянский. Википедии. (Russian Wikipedia).)
- Saint Nazarius, Abbot of Valaam Monastery (1809)
- Saint Seraphim (Zenobius), Schema-Metropolitan of Tetritskaro, Georgia, monk of Glinsk Monastery (1985)

=== New martyrs and confessors ===
- New Hieromartyr Paul Kushnikov, Priest (1918)
- New Hieromartyr Michael Edlinsky, Archpriest, of Kiev (1937) (Note: See: (in Ukrainian) Едлінський Михайло. Вікіпедії. (Ukrainian Wikipedia).) (see also: November 17)
- New Hieromartyr Alexis Nikolsky, Priest (1938)
- New Hieromartyr Nicholas Dimitrov, Priest (1938)
- New Hieromartyr Michael Razhkin, Priest (1938)
- Martyr Sergius Borodavkin (1938)
- New Hieromartyr Sergius (Bukashkin), Hieromonk, of Novo-Alexandrovka, Moscow (1938)
- New Hieromartyr Antipas (Kyrillov), hieromonk, of Tatarintsevo, Moscow (1938)
- New Hieromartyr Philaret (Pryakhin), Abbot, of Trubino, Tver (1942)

== Other commemorations ==
- Repose of Archimandrite Agapit (Belovidov) of Optina Monastery (1922)
- Repose of Elder Sabbas (Stavrobouniotes) of Cyprus (1985)
- Finding of the relics (1998) of Blessed Matrona of Moscow (1952) (Note: This celebration was entered into the Menologion according to the resolution of the Holy Synod of the Russian Orthodox Church on July 16, 2013.) (see also: May 2 - Feast day)

== Icon gallery ==
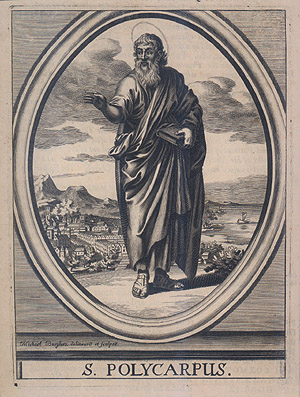
Hieromartyr Polycarp of Smyrna.

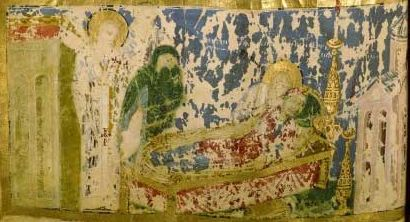
St. Gorgonia.

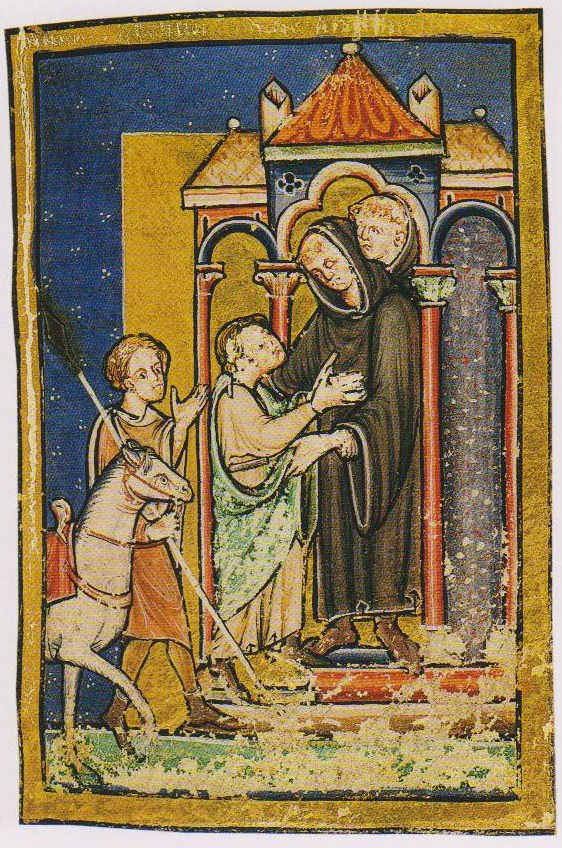
Boisil greets Cuthbert at Melrose Abbey.

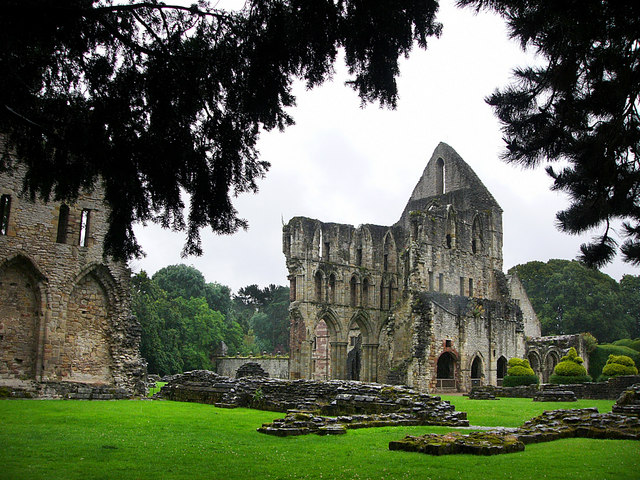
St. Mildburga's Priory, Much Wenlock.

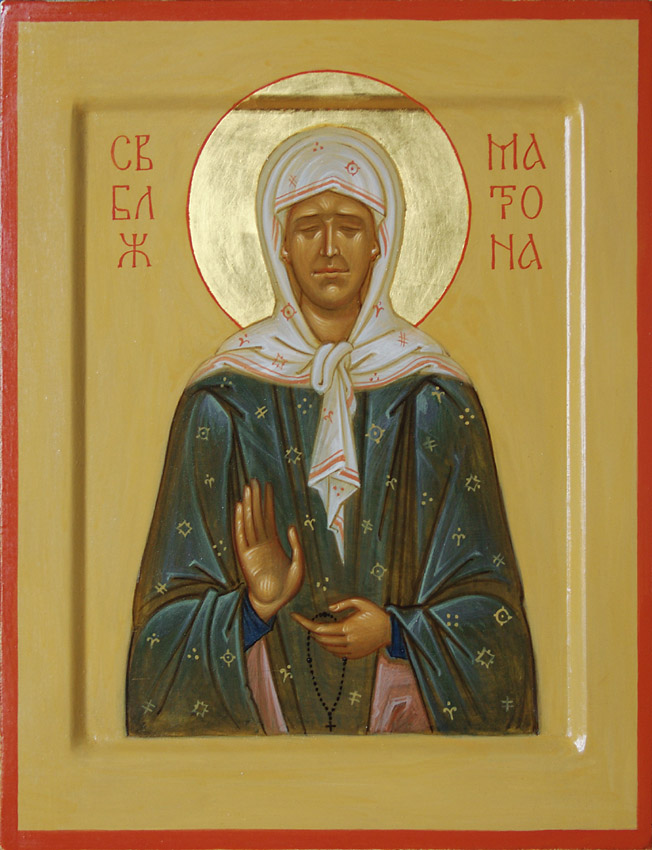
St. Matrona the Blind, the Righteous Wonderworker of Moscow.

== Sources ==
- February 23 / March 8. Orthodox Calendar (PRAVOSLAVIE.RU).
- March 8 / February 23. Holy Trinity Russian Orthodox Church (A parish of the Patriarchate of Moscow).
- February 23. OCA - The Lives of the Saints.
- The Autonomous Orthodox Metropolia of Western Europe and the Americas (ROCOR). St. Hilarion Calendar of Saints for the year of our Lord 2004. St. Hilarion Press (Austin, TX). p. 17.
- The Twenty-Third Day of the Month of February. Orthodoxy in China.
- February 23. Latin Saints of the Orthodox Patriarchate of Rome.
- The Roman Martyrology. Transl. by the Archbishop of Baltimore. Last Edition, According to the Copy Printed at Rome in 1914. Revised Edition, with the Imprimatur of His Eminence Cardinal Gibbons. Baltimore: John Murphy Company, 1916. pp. 56–57.
- Rev. Richard Stanton. A Menology of England and Wales, or, Brief Memorials of the Ancient British and English Saints Arranged According to the Calendar, Together with the Martyrs of the 16th and 17th Centuries. London: Burns & Oates, 1892. p. 81-82.

Greek Sources

- Great Synaxaristes: (in Greek) 23 ΦΕΒΡΟΥΑΡΙΟΥ. ΜΕΓΑΣ ΣΥΝΑΞΑΡΙΣΤΗΣ.
- (in Greek) Συναξαριστής. 23 Φεβρουαρίου. ECCLESIA.GR. (H ΕΚΚΛΗΣΙΑ ΤΗΣ ΕΛΛΑΔΟΣ).

Russian Sources

- (in Russian) 8 марта (23 февраля). Православная Энциклопедия под редакцией Патриарха Московского и всея Руси Кирилла (электронная версия). (Orthodox Encyclopedia - Pravenc.ru).
- (in Russian) 23 февраля (ст.ст.) 8 марта 2014 (нов. ст.). Русская Православная Церковь Отдел внешних церковных связей. (DECR).
