= May 7 (Eastern Orthodox liturgics) =

Day in the Eastern Orthodox liturgical calendar

Eastern Orthodox liturgical calendar
May 6	May 7	May 8
May 7 O.S. ≍ May 20 N.S. May 7 N.S ≍ April 24 O.S.

An Eastern Orthodox cross

May 7 in Eastern Orthodox liturgical calendars is a feast day and a day of commemoration of saints and martyrs. Although some Orthodox churches use the Revised Julian Calendar and others use the traditional Julian calendar, the fixed commemorations for their respective May 7 are broadly the same, no matter which calendar is used. (Note: Despite the dates being the same, the days to which they refer typically differ by 13 days. The notation Old Style or O.S. is sometimes used to indicate a date in the traditional Julian Calendar (the "Old Calendar"). The notation New Style or N.S. indicates a date in the Revised Julian calendar (the "New Calendar").)

== Saints ==
- Martyrs Quadratus (Codratos) of Nicomedia and his companions (251–259) (see also March 7)
- Martyrs Rufinus and Saturninus.
- Martyr Maximus.
- Hieromartyr Flavius, and Martyrs Augustus and Augustinus, from Asia Minor (c. 284-305)
- Martyr Acacius the centurion at Byzantium (303)
- The Venerable Fathers of Georgia: Saint John of Zedazeni in Georgia, and his 12 disciples (6th century):

- Shio of Mgvime; David of Gareji; Anthony of Martqopi; Thaddeus of Urbnisi (or Stepantsminda); Stephen of Khirsa; Isidore of Samtavisi; Michael of Ulumbo; Pyrrhus of Breta; Zeno of Iqalto; Jesse (Ise) of Tsilkani; Joseph of Alaverdi; Abibus of Nekressi.

- Righteous Tarasius the Hermit and Wonderworker of Lycaonia. (see also March 8 and March 9)
- Saint John the Confessor, of Psychaita, on the Bosphorus (c. 825) (see also May 26)
- King Bagrat III of Georgia (1014)

== Pre-Schism Western saints ==
- Martyr Juvenal of Benevento (132 AD)
- Saint Domitianus of Maastricht, Bishop of Maastricht (560)
- Saints Serenicus and Serenus, two brothers who became monks and later settled as hermits near the River Sarthe in France (c. 669)
- Saint Placid (Placidus, Plait), Benedictine Abbot of the Basilica Monastery of St Symphorian in Autun, France (675)
- Saint John of Beverley, Bishop of York (721) (see also: March 7)
- Saint Peter of Pavia (735)

== Post-Schism Orthodox saints ==
- Venerable Nilus of Sora, Abbot and Wonderworker (1508)
- New Monk-martyr Pachomius the Russian of Mount Athos, of Usaki near Philadelphia (1730) (see also: May 21)
- Saint Alexis Toth, Confessor and Defender of Orthodoxy in America (1909)

== Other commemorations ==
- Commemoration of the Apparition of the Sign of the Precious Cross over Jerusalem in 351 A.D.
- Synaxis of the Saints of St. Panteleimon Monastery, Mount Athos. (Note: The feast of the "Synaxis of All the Venerable Fathers and Mothers Who Shone forth in Ascetic Life" is celebrated on Cheese-Fare Saturday. The feast of the "Synaxis of All the Venerable Fathers of Mount Athos" is celebrated on the Second Sunday after Pentecost (the Sunday following All Saints' Sunday), and honors the ascetics who have shone forth on the Holy Mountain.)
- Uncovering of the relics of St. Euthymius the Great (473)
- Uncovering of the relics (1815) of Saint Nilus the Myrrh-gusher of Mount Athos (1651)
- Repose of Monk Nicholas (Boris in Schema) of Valaam and Pskov (1969) (Note: (Elder Boris 1874-1967). The Mother of God guided Elder Boris like a child throughout his whole life He suffered greatly as a child — he witnessed the near-murder of his father, was abandoned by his mother into orphan-hood and was sorely mistreated. Overcoming demonic attacks, he reached Valaam where the Mother of God entered his life through a miracle-working icon, "Surety of Sinners," which he found and kept to his death. Attuned to his conscience, he saw visions of Saints Sergius and Herman, and heeded his inner voice concerning the looming of the new-calendar war and the revolution, and remained an old calendarist. During the last ten years of his life, his disposition was such that his cell attendant remarked that he felt like a son embraced by his mother when he would go to Elder Boris for counsel. A mystic full of sobriety and clear thinking, Fr. Boris remained a true Valaam monk, adamant in his stand for the Orthodox world-view. Once Fr. Boris was occupied with the Jesus Prayer and lay down for a rest; he was raised to heaven in a dream. He said of this, "Archangel Michael looked at me, and they said to me, 'He calls you.' They do not speak as we do here, but a glance enters the soul and you understand everything.")

=== Icons ===
- Icon of the Mother of God of Liubech (11th century)
- "Zhirovits" Icon of the Most Holy Theotokos (found on a pear tree) (1470) (Note: See: (in Russian) Жировицкая икона Божией Матери. Википедии. (Russian Wikipedia).)

== Icon gallery ==
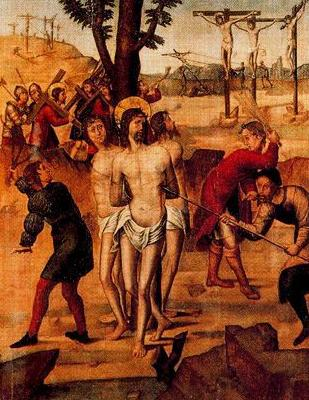
The Martyrdom of St. Acacius the centurion at Byzantium.

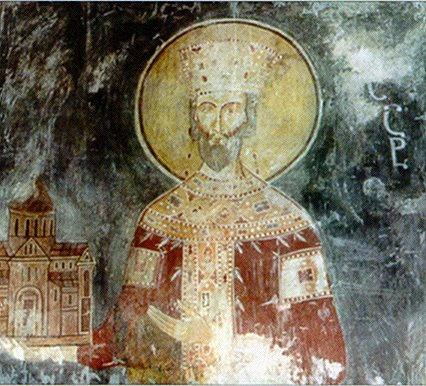
King Bagrat III of Georgia.

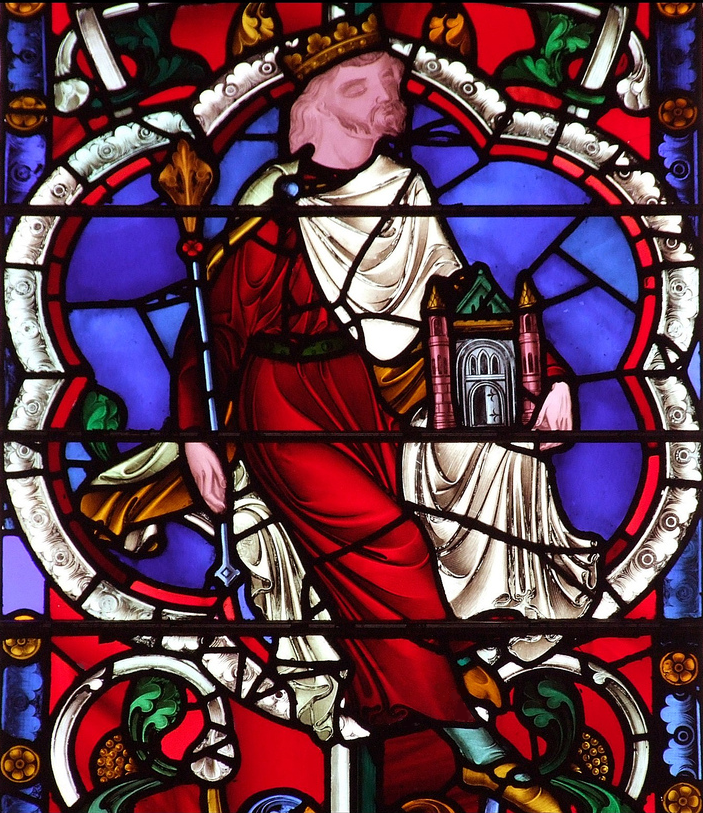
St. John of Beverley, stained glass window.

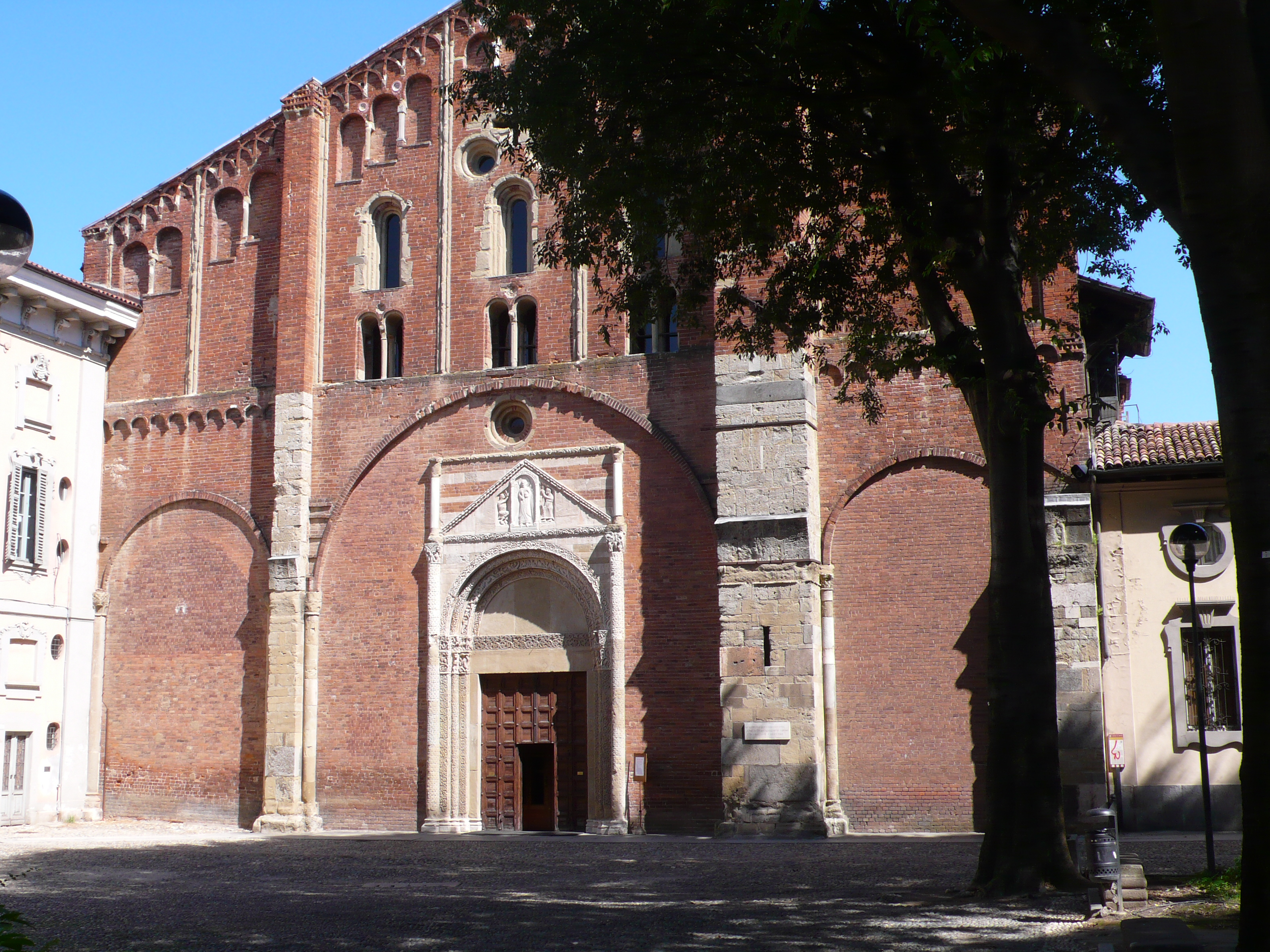
Church of St. Peter of Pavia, Pavia.

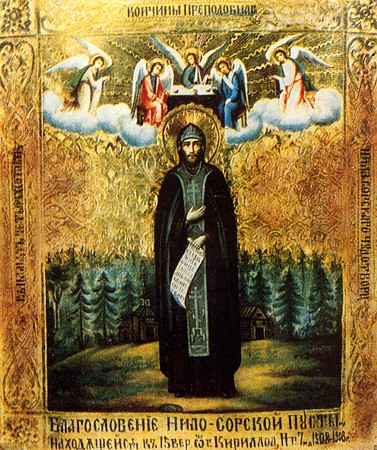
Venerable Nilus of Sora.

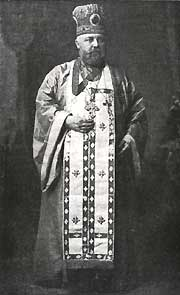
St. Alexis Toth of Wilkes-Barre.

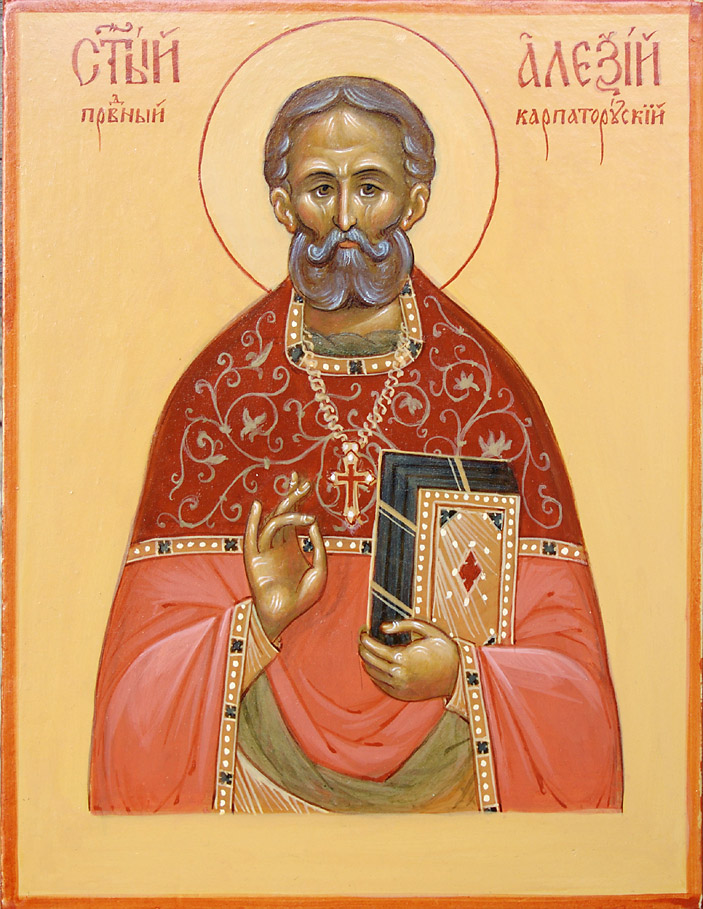
St. Alexis Toth of Wilkes-Barre.

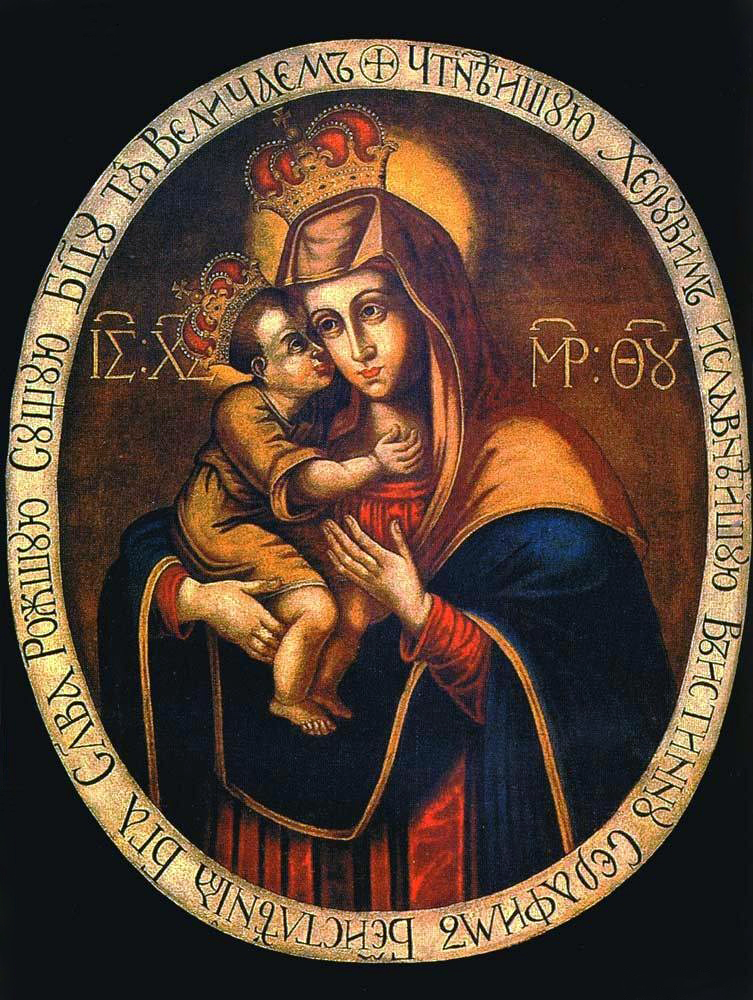
"Zhirovits" Icon of the Most Holy Theotokos.

== Sources ==
- May 7/20. Orthodox Calendar (PRAVOSLAVIE.RU).
- May 7. OCA - The Lives of the Saints.
- May 7. Latin Saints of the Orthodox Patriarchate of Rome.
- May 7, The Roman Martyrology.

Greek Sources

- Great Synaxaristes: (in Greek) 7 ΜΑΪΟΥ, ΜΕΓΑΣ ΣΥΝΑΞΑΡΙΣΤΗΣ.
- (in Greek) Συναξαριστής. 7 Μαΐου. ECCLESIA.GR. (H ΕΚΚΛΗΣΙΑ ΤΗΣ ΕΛΛΑΔΟΣ).

Russian Sources

- (in Russian) 20 мая (7 мая). Православная Энциклопедия под редакцией Патриарха Московского и всея Руси Кирилла (электронная версия). (Orthodox Encyclopedia - Pravenc.ru).
- (in Russian) 7 мая (ст.ст.) 20 мая 2013 (нов. ст.). Русская Православная Церковь Отдел внешних церковных связей. (DECR).
