= February 25 (Eastern Orthodox liturgics) =

Day in the Eastern Orthodox liturgical calendar

Eastern Orthodox liturgical calendar
February 24	February 25	February 26
February 25 O.S. ≍ March 10 (or March 9 (Note: in a leap year)) N.S. February 25 N.S ≍ February 12 O.S.

An Eastern Orthodox cross

February 25 in Eastern Orthodox liturgical calendars is a feast day and a day of commemoration of saints and martyrs. Although some Orthodox churches use the Revised Julian Calendar and others use the traditional Julian calendar, the fixed commemorations for their respective February 25 are broadly the same, no matter which calendar is used. (Note: Despite the dates being the same, the days to which they refer typically differ by 13 days. The notation Old Style or O.S. is sometimes used to indicate a date in the traditional Julian Calendar (the "Old Calendar"). The notation New Style or N.S. indicates a date in the Revised Julian calendar (the "New Calendar").)

== Saints ==
- Martyr Alexander, at Marcianopolis, Thracia (c. 305)
- Martyr Anthony, by being burned alive
- Saint Theodore, Fool-for-Christ
- Hieromartyr Reginus, Bishop of the isle of Skopelos (355)
- Saint Marcellus, Bishop of Aipeia, Cyprus (Note: Aipeia or Epia was an ancient city in Cyprus. Ancient Greek epic poetry referred to many settlers of the city, all heroes of the Trojan War who arrived in Cyprus after that war. (See: (in Greek): Αιπεία Κύπρου). This bishop may also be confused with Hieromartyr Marcellus, Bishop of Apamea (389), who celebrates on August 14.)
- Venerable Paphnutius, Monk of Kephala, contemporary of Saint Anthony the Great (4th century)
- Saint Tarasius, Patriarch of Constantinople (806)

== Pre-Schism Western saints ==
- Saints Donatus, Justus, Herena and Companions, a group of fifty martyrs who suffered in North Africa under Decius (3rd century)
- Saint Ethelbert, King of Kent (616) (Note: King of Kent and High King of England, he protected St. Augustine's mission and may have been baptised by him as early as Pentecost 597. Though he never tried to force his subjects into Christianity, thousands followed his apostolic example.)
- Saint Aldetrudis (Adeltrudis) of Maubeuge Abbey (c. 696) (Note: Daughter of Sts Vincent Madelgarus and Waldetrudis and a niece of St. Aldegund of Maubeuge in France, she was confided to her aunt's care at this convent, where she became the second abbess.)
- Saint Walburga, Abbess of Heidenheim (779) (Note: Sister of Sts. Willibald and Winebald. She became a nun at Wimborne in Dorset in England with St. Tetta and followed St. Lioba to Germany. She reposed as Abbess of Heidenheim, from where her relics were translated to Eichstätt (May 1). Miraculous healings come from the oil which still flows from the rock on which her shrine is placed.)
- Saint Victor, a monk at St. Gall, Switzerland who became a hermit in the Vosges in France where he reposed (995)

== Post-Schism Orthodox saints ==
(none)

=== New martyrs and confessors ===
- New Hieromartyr Sylvester Olshevsky, Archbishop of Omsk and Pavlodar (1920) (Note: See: (in Russian) Сильвестр (Ольшевский). Википедии. (Russian Wikipedia).) (see also: July 3)
- New Hieromartyr Alexander Vinogradov, Priest (1938)
- New Virgin Martyr Mstislava Fokinoi (1938)
- New Hieromartyr Leo Korobczuk, Priest of Laskov (Chełm and Podlasie, Poland) (1944) (Note: See: (in Polish) Lew Korobczuk. Wikipedii. (Polish Wikipedia).)
- New Hieromartyr Nicholas Troitsky, Priest (1945)

== Other commemorations ==
- Repose of Blessed Pashenka of Nizhny Novgorod (1934)

== Icon gallery ==
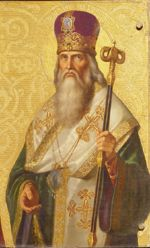
Saint Tarasius of Constantinople.

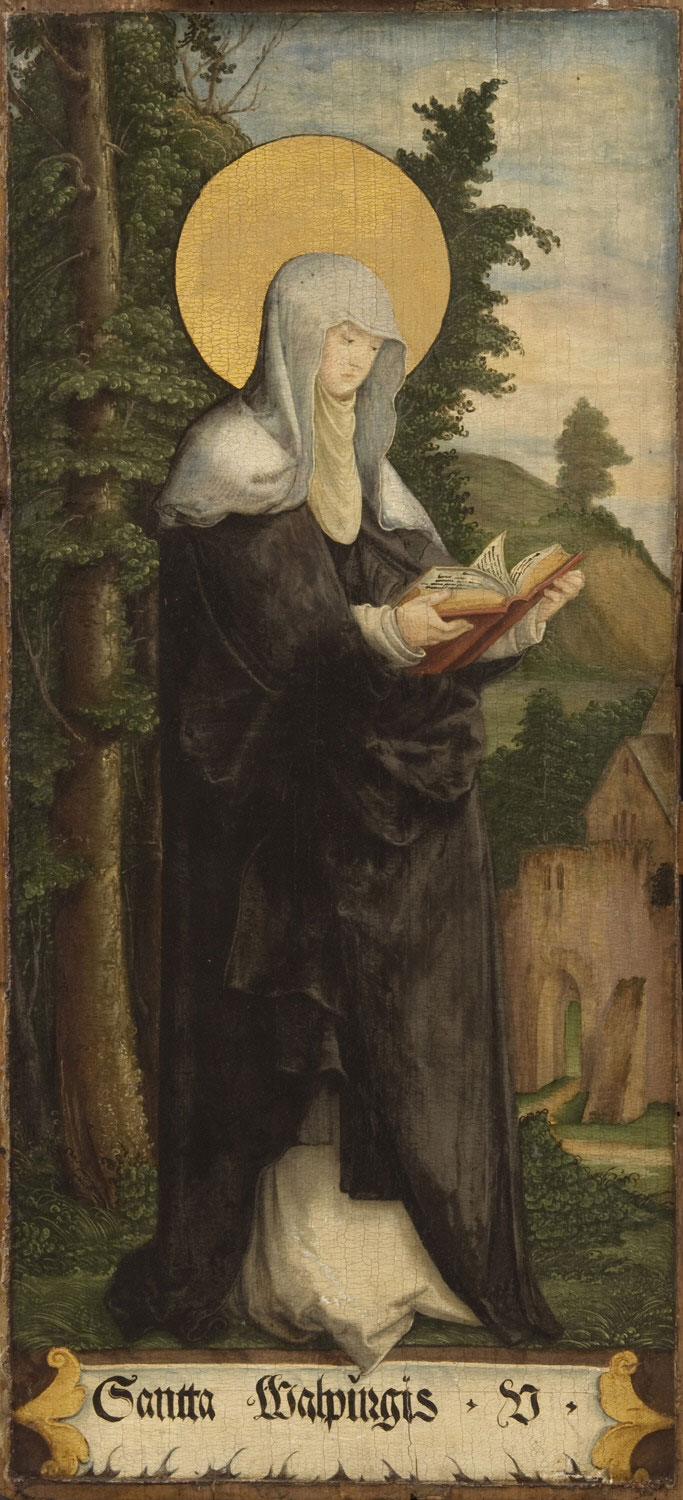
Saint Walburga.

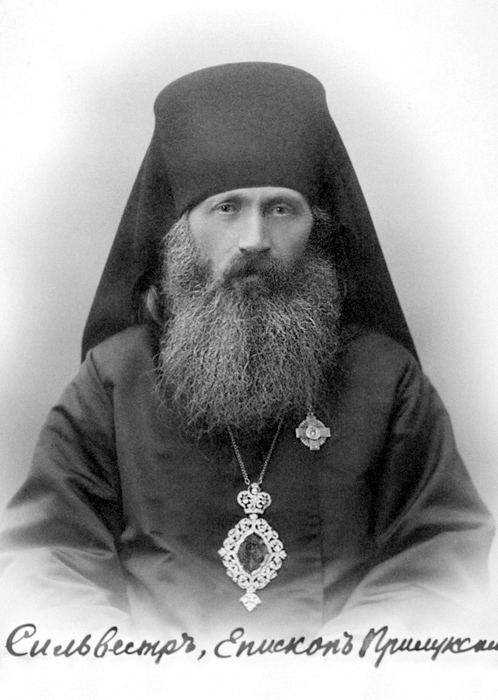
New Hieromartyr Sylvester (Olshevsky), Archbishop of Omsk and Pavlodar.

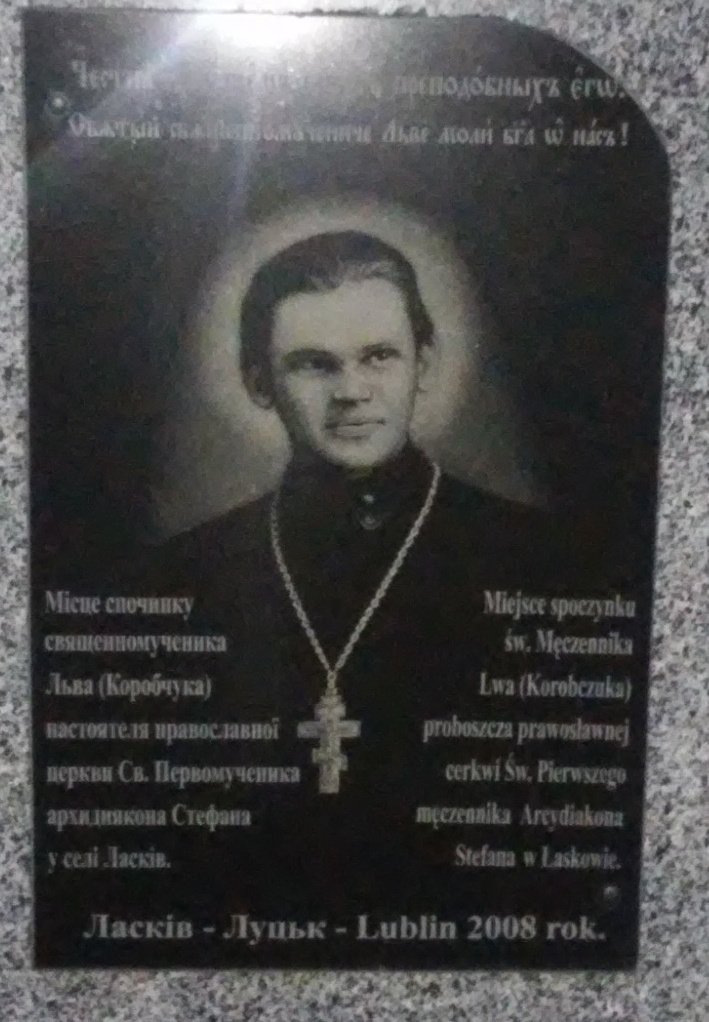
New Hieromartyr Leo Korobczuk.

== Sources ==
- February 25 / March 10. Orthodox Calendar (Pravoslavie.ru).
- March 10 / February 25. Holy Trinity Russian Orthodox Church (A parish of the Patriarchate of Moscow).
- February 25. OCA - The Lives of the Saints.
- The Autonomous Orthodox Metropolia of Western Europe and the Americas. St. Hilarion Calendar of Saints for the year of our Lord 2004. St. Hilarion Press (Austin, TX). p. 17.
- The Twenty-Fifth Day of the Month of February. Orthodoxy in China.
- February 25. Latin Saints of the Orthodox Patriarchate of Rome.
- The Roman Martyrology. Transl. by the Archbishop of Baltimore. Last Edition, According to the Copy Printed at Rome in 1914. Revised Edition, with the Imprimatur of His Eminence Cardinal Gibbons. Baltimore: John Murphy Company, 1916. p. 58.
- Rev. Richard Stanton. A Menology of England and Wales, or, Brief Memorials of the Ancient British and English Saints Arranged According to the Calendar, Together with the Martyrs of the 16th and 17th Centuries. London: Burns & Oates, 1892. pp. 84-85.

Greek Sources

- Great Synaxaristes: (in Greek) 25 ΦΕΒΡΟΥΑΡΙΟΥ. Μεγασ Συναξαριστησ.
- (in Greek) Συναξαριστής. 25 Φεβρουαρίου. Ecclesia.gr. (H Εκκλησια τησ Ελλαδοσ).

Russian Sources

- (in Russian) 10 марта (25 февраля). Православная Энциклопедия под редакцией Патриарха Московского и всея Руси Кирилла (электронная версия). (Orthodox Encyclopedia - Pravenc.ru).
- (in Russian) 25 февраля (ст.ст.) 10 марта 2014 (нов. ст.). Русская Православная Церковь Отдел внешних церковных связей. (DECR).
