= March 7 (Eastern Orthodox liturgics) =

Day in the Eastern Orthodox liturgical calendar

Eastern Orthodox liturgical calendar
March 6	March 7	March 8
March 7 O.S. ≍ March 20 N.S. March 7 N.S ≍ February 22 (or February 23 (Note: in a leap year)) O.S.

An Eastern Orthodox cross

March 7 in Eastern Orthodox liturgical calendars is a feast day and a day of commemoration of saints and martyrs. Although some Orthodox churches use the Revised Julian Calendar and others use the traditional Julian calendar, the fixed commemorations for their respective March 7 are broadly the same, no matter which calendar is used. (Note: Despite the dates being the same, the days to which they refer typically differ by 13 days. The notation Old Style or O.S. is sometimes used to indicate a date in the traditional Julian Calendar (the "Old Calendar"). The notation New Style or N.S. indicates a date in the Revised Julian calendar (the "New Calendar").)

== Saints ==
- Martyrs Codratus (Quadratus), Saturninus, and Rufinus, of Nicomedia (250-259) (see also: May 7)
- Martyrs Aemilian the Roman, and Jacob (James) and Marianos with him, under Valerian (259)
- The Holy Hieromartyrs of Cherson:

- Basil, Ephraim, Capito, Eugene, Aetherius, Elpidius, and Agathadorus (4th century)

- Venerable Paul the Simple, of Egypt (ca. 339), disciple of St. Anthony the Great.
- Saints Nestor and Arcadius, Bishops of Tremithous, (Note: (in Greek) Επισκοπή Τριμυθούντος. Βικιπαίδεια. (Greek Wikipedia).) in Cyprus (4th century)
- Venerable Ephraim of Antioch, Patriarch of Antioch (545)
- Saint Paul the Confessor, Bishop of Plousias in Bithynia (ca. 840)

== Pre-Schism Western saints ==
- Martyrs Perpetua of Carthage, and the catechumens Felicity, Saturus (Satyrus), Saturninus, Revocatus and Secundulus at Carthage (202-203) (Note: "O GOD, who among the manifold works of thine almighty power hast bestowed even upon the weakness of women strength to win the victory of martyrdom: grant, we beseech thee, that we, who on this day recall the heavenly birth of blessed Perpetua and Felicity, thy Martyrs, may so follow in their footsteps, that we may likewise attain unto thee. Through Christ our Lord. Amen.") (Note: "St. Augustine relates that Felicitas, being with child, her execution was deferred, according to the laws, until after her delivery, and whilst she was in labor she mourned, and when exposed to the beasts, she rejoiced. With them suffered Revocatus, Saturninus, and Secundulus. This last died in prison; all the others were delivered to the beasts.") (Note: Vivia Perpetua was a young married woman of good social position. Felicity, also married, was a slave. The others were catechumens and Saturus perhaps their instructor. All were imprisoned together in Carthage in North Africa as a law of Septimus Severus forbade conversions to the faith. Secundulus died in prison: the others were thrown to the wild beasts in the amphitheatre on March 7. Their Acts were written by Saturus, one of the martyrs, and completed by an eyewitness.) (see also: February 1 - East.)
- Saint Gaudiosus of Brescia, Confessor and Bishop of Brescia in Italy, where his relics were venerated (445)
- Saint Enodoch (Wenedoc), a saint in Wales (ca. 520)
- Saint Drausinus (Drausius), Bishop of Soissons, did much to encourage monasticism (ca. 576)
- Saint Deifer, founder of Bodfari in Clwyd in Wales (6th century)
- Saint Emilian, monk, of Italia (6th century)
- Saint Eosterwine, the second Anglo-Saxon Abbot of Wearmouth in Northumbria (688) (Note: A Northumbrian noble, he entered the monastery of Wearmouth with his relative St Benedict. He succeeded St Benedict as abbot. He was celebrated for his gentleness.)
- Saint John of Beverley, Bishop of York (721) (see also: May 7)
- Saint Ardo Smaragdus, a hagiographer, abbot of the monastery of Aniane (843) (Note: Born in Languedoc in France, he changed his name from Smaragdus on becoming a monk at Aniane with its first Abbot, St Benedict, whom he later succeeded as abbot.)

== Post-Schism Orthodox saints ==
- Venerable Laurence (Lavrentios of Megara), founder of the monastery of the Mother of God Phaneromeni on Salamis Island (1707) (Note: The Monk Laurentios was churchwarden of a monastery in honour of the Most Holy Mother of God on the island of Salamis. He reposed on 6 March 1770, and his memory is observed on March 7.)
- Saint Dandus (Dandas) and All Saints of Thrace.

=== New martyrs and confessors ===
- New Hieromartyr Nicholas, Priest (1930)
- New Hieromartyr Nilus (Tyutyukin), Hieromonk of St. Joseph of Volokolamsk Monastery (1938)
- Virgin-martyrs Matrona, Mary, Eudocia, Ecaterina, Antonina, Nadezhda, Xenia, and Anna (1938)

== Other commemorations ==
- Synaxis of the Saints of the Dodecanese.
- Repose of Schemamonk Sisoes of Valaam (1931) (Note: Having arrived on Valaam during the abbacy of Damascene and having become fully absorbed by the spirit of that monastic general, Elder Sisoes (Seraphim before the schema) became an elder, directing monks souls in the art of unseen warfare, so that long lines of monks would wait at his door for counsel. For fifty years he lived in Valaam and its various sketes as well as in the metochia in St Petersburg and Moscow. He ended his life as a staunch defender of the Church Calendar and hesychastic way of life so typical of the monks of Valaam. Elder Sisoes had as disciples among others, Monk Justinian, who left brief biographical data on his elder. He claimed that Elder Sisoes was a possessor of the unceasing Jesus Prayer which would automatically murmur in his heart, of ten accompanied by an abundance of rears He would sweetly whisper, Jesus, have mercy, and everything around him would be transformed as he lay in the infirmary with other schema monks who, dressed in their cowls and with their arms crossed, waited on the Lord's grace, for their souls to be pulled' out of them, so they could fly straight to heaven.)

=== Icons ===
- Icon of the Most Holy Theotokos "Surety of Sinners" in Korets (1622), Odrin (1843) and Moscow (1848). (Note: (in Russian) Икона Божией Матери «Споручница грешных». Википедии. (Russian Wikipedia).) (see also May 29)
- Icon of the Most Holy Theotokos "Of Czestochowa". (see also" March 6)

== Icon gallery ==
Hieromartyr Capiton (Capito) of Cherson.
(Menologion of Basil II, 10th century).

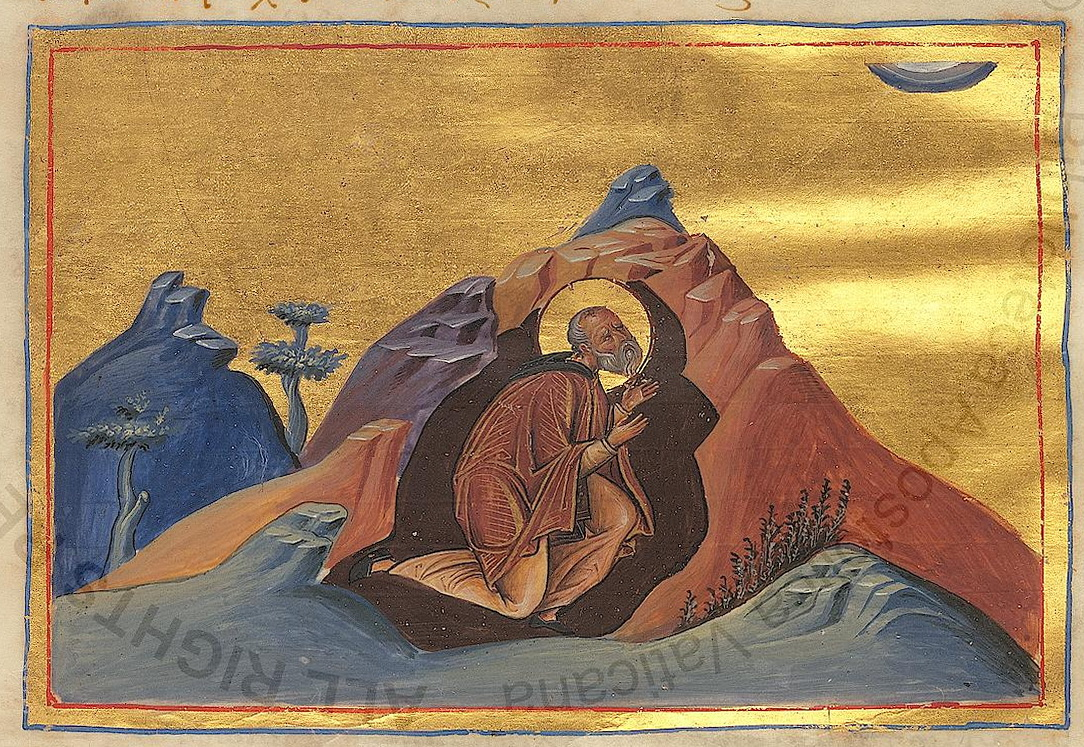
Venerable Paul the Simple.
(Menologion of Basil II, 10th century).

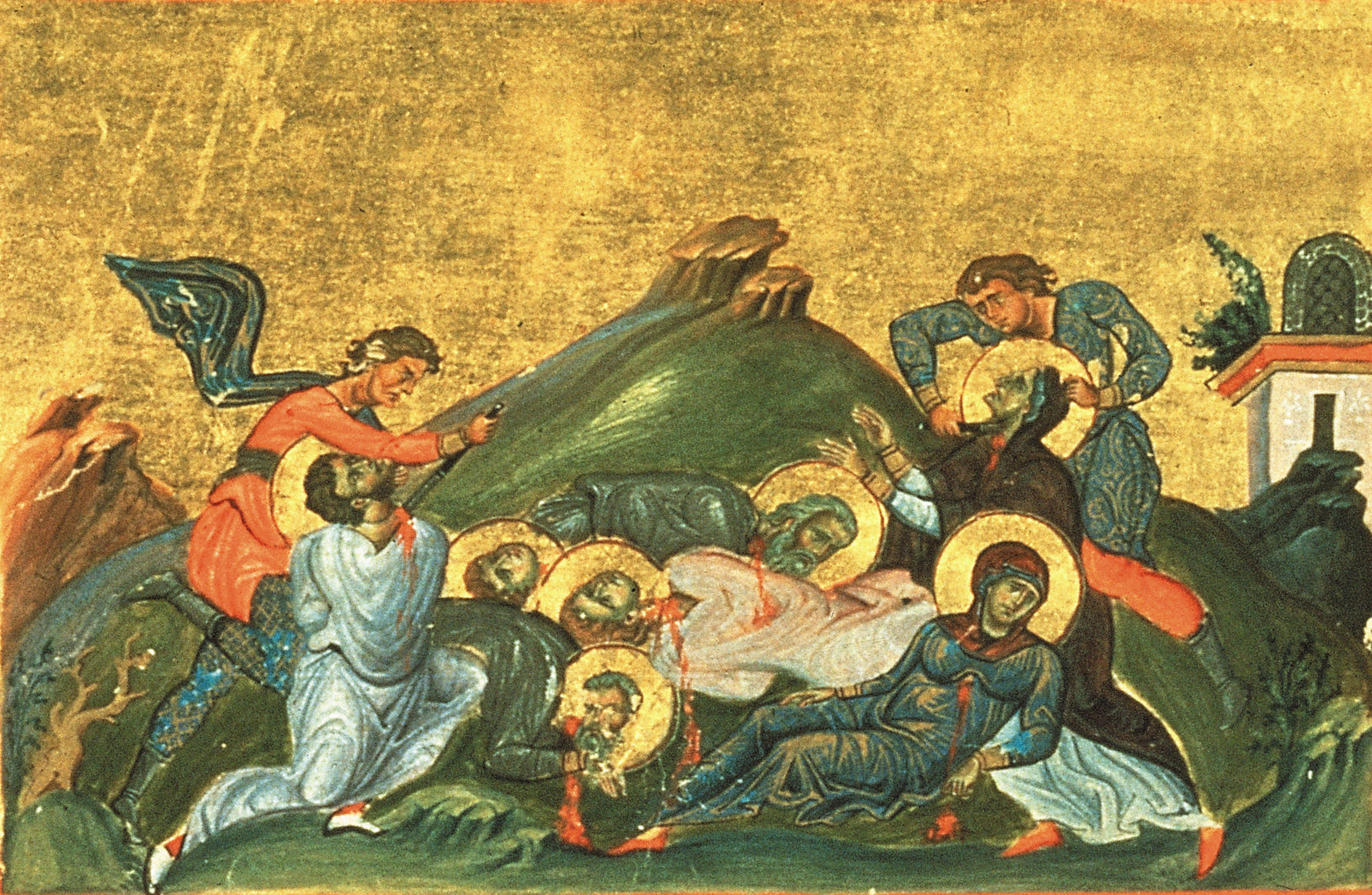
Martyrs Perpetua of Carthage, with Felicity, Saturus (Satyrus), Saturninus, Revocatus and Secundulus.
(Menologion of Basil II, 10th century).

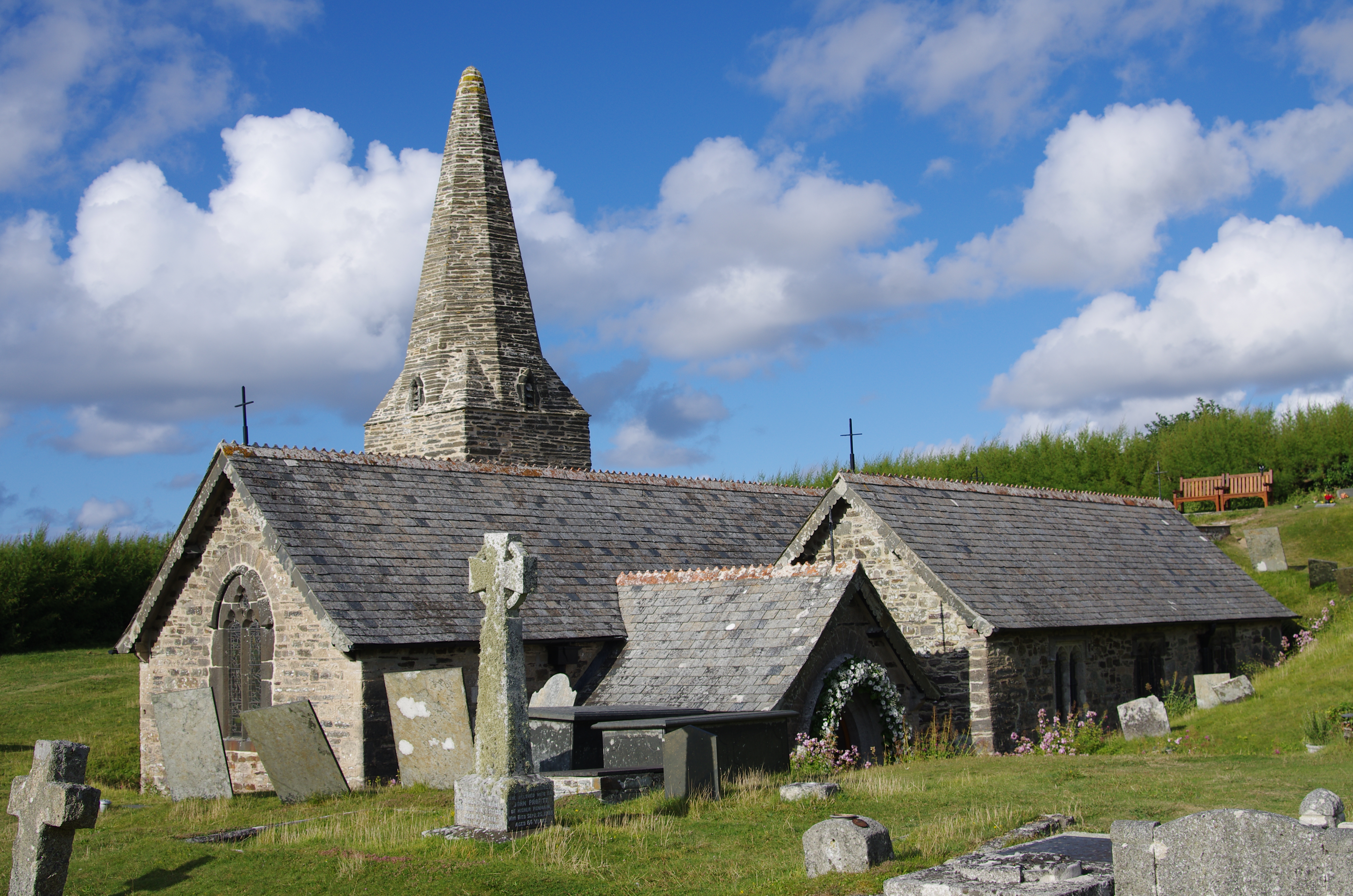
St Enodoc's Church, Trebetherick, Cornwall, England.

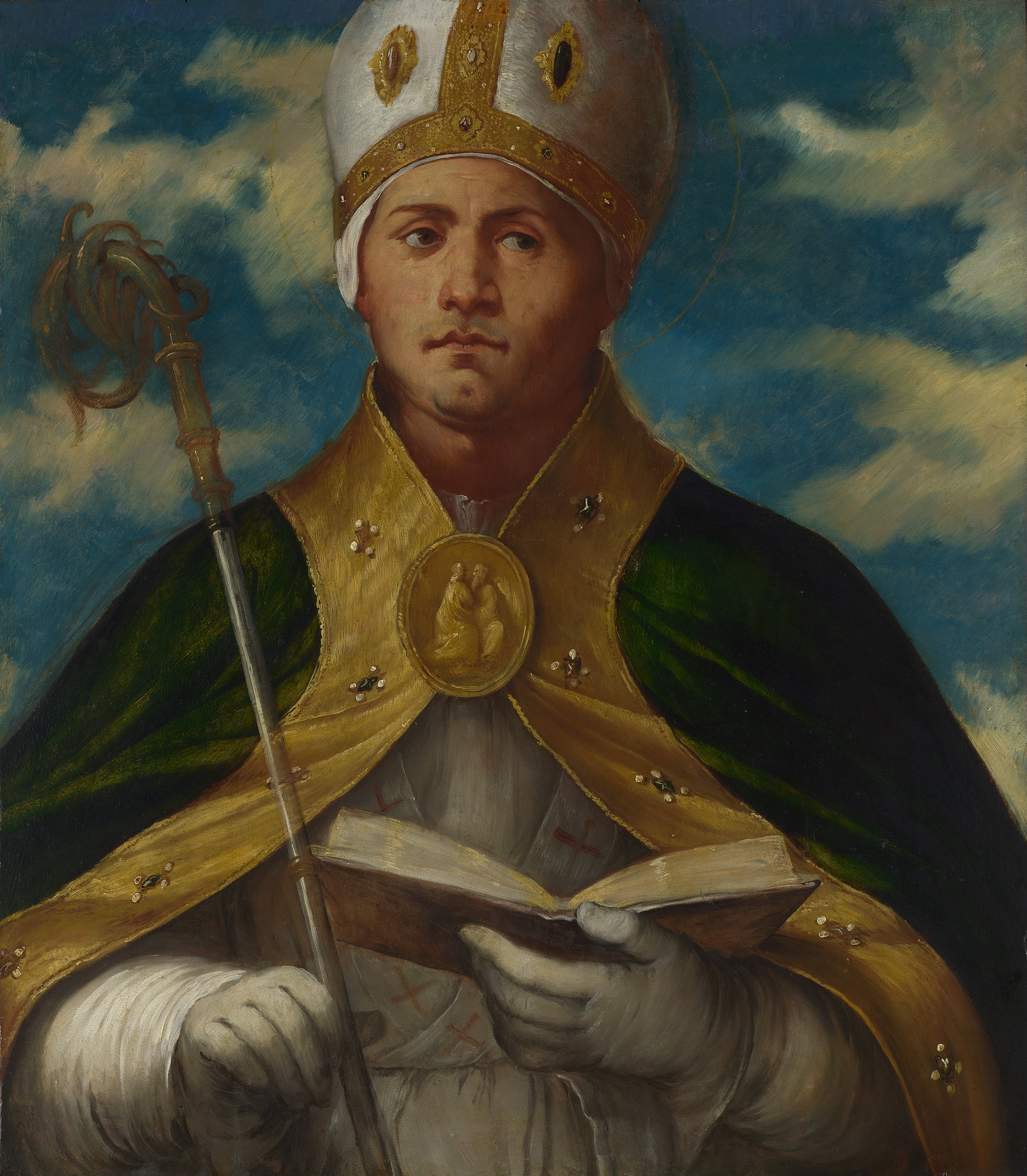
St. Gaudiosus of Brescia.

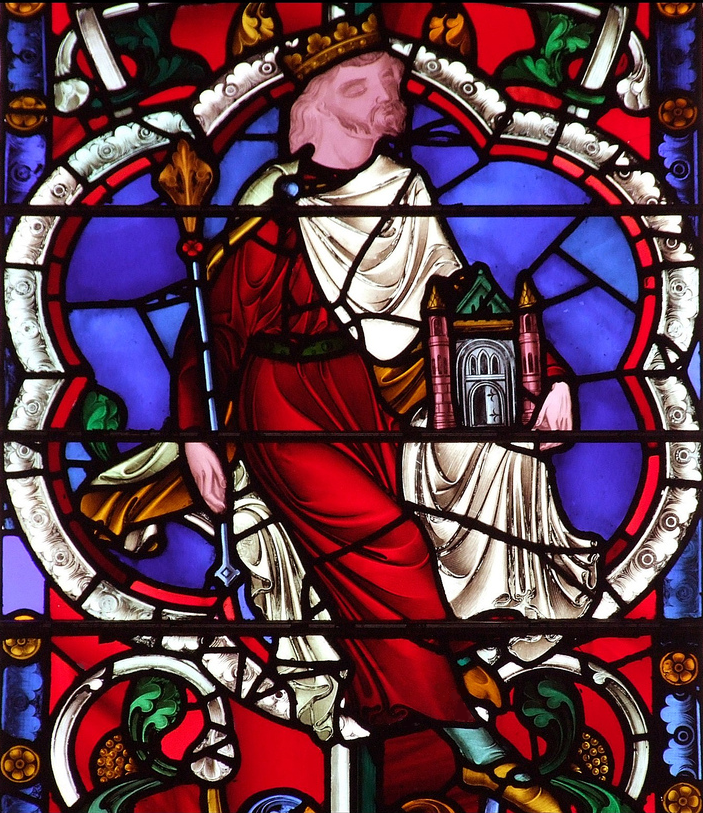
Saint John of Beverley, Bishop of York.

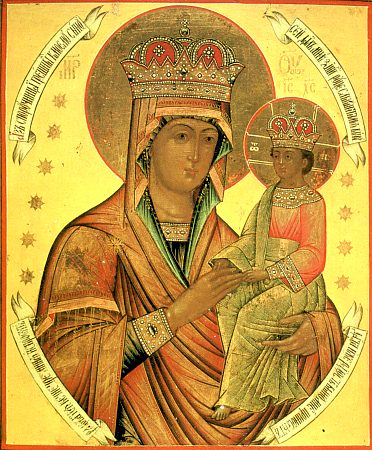
Icon of the Mother of God "the Surety of sinners" of Odrino, Orlov.

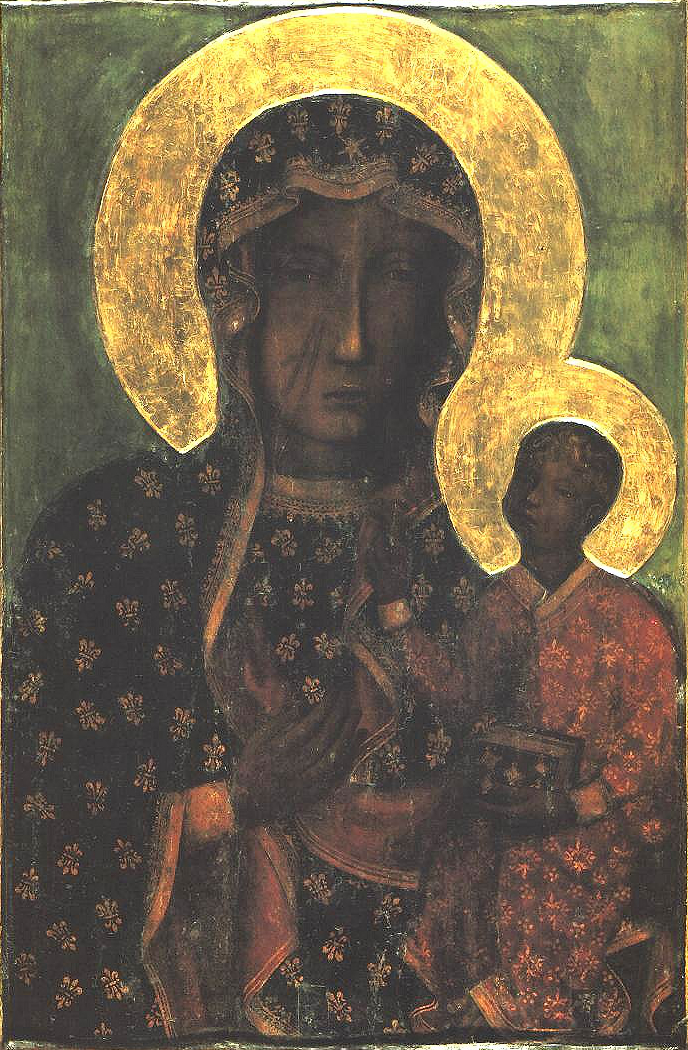
Icon of the Most Holy Theotokos "Of Czestochowa" (Black Madonna).

== Sources ==
- March 7/March 20. Orthodox Calendar (PRAVOSLAVIE.RU).
- March 20 / March 7. HOLY TRINITY RUSSIAN ORTHODOX CHURCH (A parish of the Patriarchate of Moscow).
- March 7. OCA - The Lives of the Saints.
- The Autonomous Orthodox Metropolia of Western Europe and the Americas (ROCOR). St. Hilarion Calendar of Saints for the year of our Lord 2004. St. Hilarion Press (Austin, TX). p. 20.
- March 7. Latin Saints of the Orthodox Patriarchate of Rome.
- The Roman Martyrology. Transl. by the Archbishop of Baltimore. Last Edition, According to the Copy Printed at Rome in 1914. Revised Edition, with the Imprimatur of His Eminence Cardinal Gibbons. Baltimore: John Murphy Company, 1916. pp. 68–69.

Greek Sources

- Great Synaxaristes: (in Greek) 7 ΜΑΡΤΙΟΥ. ΜΕΓΑΣ ΣΥΝΑΞΑΡΙΣΤΗΣ.
- (in Greek) Συναξαριστής. 7 Μαρτίου. ECCLESIA.GR. (H ΕΚΚΛΗΣΙΑ ΤΗΣ ΕΛΛΑΔΟΣ).

Russian Sources

- (in Russian) 20 марта (7 марта). Православная Энциклопедия под редакцией Патриарха Московского и всея Руси Кирилла (электронная версия). (Orthodox Encyclopedia - Pravenc.ru).
- (in Russian) 7 марта (ст.ст.) 20 марта 2013 (нов. ст.). Русская Православная Церковь Отдел внешних церковных связей. (DECR).
