= Hieromartyrs of Cherson =

The Hieromartyrs of Cherson were a group of early 4th-century bishops who were martyred in Cherson, at the time in the Bosporan Kingdom in Taurica (Crimea) under the Roman client king Tiberius Julius Rhadamsades, during the Diocletian persecution (303–313). They are commemorated by the Orthodox church on March 7.

The group consists of seven saints. They were not killed on one occasion, but in succession, as they were sent to Crimea by Hermon, the 38th bishop of Jerusalem (r. c. 302–314). The first two were Basil and Ephraim (Ephrem). After they were killed, they were followed by Eugene, Elpidius, and Agathodorus, who were in turn replaced by Aetherius (Etherius) and Capiton (Capito). Capiton was killed, but Aetherius avoided martyrdom, as Constantine the Great placed him under his protection. Aetherius travelled to Constantinople to thank the emperor, and he died from illness on the return journey. Also associated with the group are saints Nestor and Arcadius, who were possibly martyred in Cyprus.

== See also ==
- Hieromartyr
