= March 8 (Eastern Orthodox liturgics) =

Day in the Eastern Orthodox liturgical calendar

Eastern Orthodox liturgical calendar
March 7	March 8	March 9
March 8 O.S. ≍ March 21 N.S. March 8 N.S ≍ February 23 (or February 24 (Note: in a leap year)) O.S.

An Eastern Orthodox cross

March 8 in Eastern Orthodox liturgical calendars is a feast day and a day of commemoration of saints and martyrs. Although some Orthodox churches use the Revised Julian Calendar and others use the traditional Julian calendar, the fixed commemorations for their respective March 8 are broadly the same, no matter which calendar is used. (Note: Despite the dates being the same, the days to which they refer typically differ by 13 days. The notation Old Style or O.S. is sometimes used to indicate a date in the traditional Julian Calendar (the "Old Calendar"). The notation New Style or N.S. indicates a date in the Revised Julian calendar (the "New Calendar").)

== Saints ==
- Apostle Hermas of the Seventy, Bishop in Philipopoulis (1st century)
- Martyr Dius (Dion, Dionos), by the sword.
- Martyrs Quinctilian and Capatolinus, at Nicomedia.
- Venerable Dometius, reposed in peace (363) (Note: "It is possible that this St Dometius is the same as St Dometius the Persian who is commemorated on August 7 with his two disciples.")
- Hieromartyr Theodoretus, priest, of Antioch (361-363) (see also: March 3)
- Venerable Paul the Confessor, bishop of Plousias in Bithynia (c. 840) (see also March 7)
- Saint Theophylactus, Bishop of Nicomedia (842)
- Righteous Tarasius the Wonderworker, of Lycaonia. (see also March 9 and May 7)

== Pre-Schism Western saints ==
- Saint Pontius of Carthage, a Deacon of the Church of Carthage (c. 260) (Note: He was with St Cyprian in his exile, at his trial and execution, and wrote his Life.)
- Hieromartyr Cyril, a bishop, with martyrs Rogatus, Felix, another Rogatus, Beata, Herenia, Felicitas, Urban, Silvanus and Mamillus, martyrs in North Africa.
- Saint Provinus, Bishop of Como in Italy (c. 420)
- Saint Beoadh (Beatus), Bishop of Ardcarne in Roscommon in Ireland (c. 518)
- Saint Senán mac Geirrcinn (Senames), a monk in Kilmanagh in Ireland (c. 540) (Note: A monk in Kilmanagh in Ireland. Having founded a monastery, probably in Enniscorthy, he is said to have visited Rome and on his way home stayed with St David in Wales. On his return to Ireland he founded more churches and monasteries, notably one in Iniscarra near Cork. Finally he settled on Scattery Island in the Shannon estuary where he was buried.)
- Saint Felix of Burgundy, Bishop of Dunwich and Enlightener of East Anglia (c. 648) (Note: "ST. FELIX was a native of Burgundy, and was already consecrated Bishop, when his zeal for the spread of the Faith brought him to England, that he might share in the work of the conversion of our ancestors. He explained his wish to St. Honorius, the Archbishop of Canterbury, and was advised by him to betake himself to East Anglia, where the pious King St. Sigebert was labouring for the conversion of his people. The Saint established his See at Dunwich, in Suffolk, and forthwith began his apostolic work. So great was the success with which God favoured him that, after an episcopate of seventeen years, when he was called to the reward of his labours, the whole province was found to be Christian. St. Felix was buried at Dunwich, but afterwards translated to Seham, near Ely, and finally, many years later, to Ramsey Abbey.")
- Saint Julian of Toledo, Archbishop of Toledo and Confessor (690) (Note: A monk at Agali in Spain under St Eugene, whom he succeeded first as Abbot and in 680 as Archbishop of Toledo. He was the first Metropolitan of All Iberia. Presiding over several national Councils, revising and developing the Mozarabic liturgy, he was a prolific writer and outstanding churchman.)
- Saint Humphrey (Hunfrid of Prüm), Bishop of Therouanne in France and was Abbot of St Bertin (871) (Note: He was a source of strength and comfort to the people during the Norman invasion. He kept the feast of the Dormition with special splendour.)
- Saint Duthac, Bishop of Ross, patron saint of Tain, Scotland (d. 1065).

== Post-Schism Orthodox saints ==
- Venerable Saints Lazarus (1391) and Athanasius (15th century), monks of Murman Island, Onega Lake, Republic of Karelia.

=== New martyrs and confessors ===
- New Hieromartyr John Znamensky, Priest (1923)
- Martyr Vladimir Ushkov (1942)
- Saint Andronicus (Lukash), Schema-Archimandrite of Tbilisi, Georgia, Elder of Glinsk Hermitage (1974)
- New Martyr and Confessor John of Sonkajanranta (Johannes (Ivan) Vasileinpoika Karhapää) (1884–1918)
- New Hieromartyr Liviu (Galaction) of Cluj, professor in theology at Cluj-Napoca, Confessor of the Faith in communist Romania (1961) (Note: See: (in Romanian) Liviu Galaction Munteanu. Wikipedia. (Romanian Wikipedia).)

== Other commemorations ==
- “Kursk Root” Icon of the Sign of the Most Holy Theotokos (“Kurska-Korinna”) (1295) (Note: This is a copy of the famous “Kursk Root” Icon of the Most Holy Theotokos commemorated on November 27.)
- Repose of Blessed Basiliscus of Uglich (1863)
- Repose of Archbishop Vitaly (Maximenko) of Eastern America (1960)

== Icon gallery ==
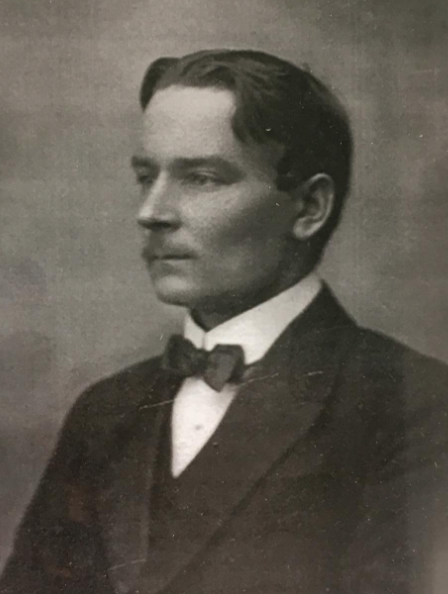
New Martyr and Confessor John (Karhapää) of Ilomantsi.

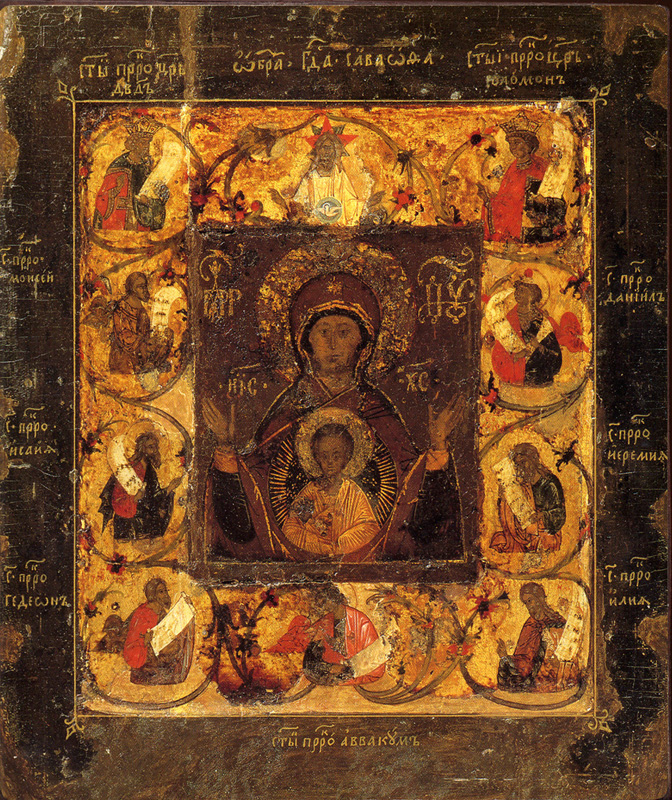
Kurskaya Korennaya icon

== Sources ==
- March 8/March 21. Orthodox Calendar (PRAVOSLAVIE.RU).
- March 21 / March 8. HOLY TRINITY RUSSIAN ORTHODOX CHURCH (A parish of the Patriarchate of Moscow).
- March 8. OCA - The Lives of the Saints.
- The Autonomous Orthodox Metropolia of Western Europe and the Americas (ROCOR). St. Hilarion Calendar of Saints for the year of our Lord 2004. St. Hilarion Press (Austin, TX). p. 20.
- March 8. Latin Saints of the Orthodox Patriarchate of Rome.
- The Roman Martyrology. Transl. by the Archbishop of Baltimore. Last Edition, According to the Copy Printed at Rome in 1914. Revised Edition, with the Imprimatur of His Eminence Cardinal Gibbons. Baltimore: John Murphy Company, 1916. pp. 69–70.

Greek Sources

- Great Synaxaristes: (in Greek) 8 ΜΑΡΤΙΟΥ. ΜΕΓΑΣ ΣΥΝΑΞΑΡΙΣΤΗΣ.
- (in Greek) Συναξαριστής. 8 Μαρτίου. ECCLESIA.GR. (H ΕΚΚΛΗΣΙΑ ΤΗΣ ΕΛΛΑΔΟΣ).

Russian Sources

- (in Russian) 21 марта (8 марта). Православная Энциклопедия под редакцией Патриарха Московского и всея Руси Кирилла (электронная версия). (Orthodox Encyclopedia - Pravenc.ru).
- (in Russian) 8 марта (ст.ст.) 21 марта 2013 (нов. ст.). Русская Православная Церковь Отдел внешних церковных связей. (DECR).
