= March 9 (Eastern Orthodox liturgics) =

Day in the Eastern Orthodox liturgical calendar

Eastern Orthodox liturgical calendar
March 8	March 9	March 10
March 9 O.S. ≍ March 22 N.S. March 9 N.S ≍ February 24 (or February 25 (Note: in a leap year)) O.S.

An Eastern Orthodox cross

March 9 in Eastern Orthodox liturgical calendars is a feast day and a day of commemoration of saints and martyrs. Although some Orthodox churches use the Revised Julian Calendar and others use the traditional Julian calendar, the fixed commemorations for their respective March 9 are broadly the same, no matter which calendar is used. (Note: Despite the dates being the same, the days to which they refer typically differ by 13 days. The notation Old Style or O.S. is sometimes used to indicate a date in the traditional Julian Calendar (the "Old Calendar"). The notation New Style or N.S. indicates a date in the Revised Julian calendar (the "New Calendar").)

== Saints ==
- Martyr Urpasian the Senator, at Nicomedia, by being burned alive (c. 305)
- The Holy Forty Martyrs of Sebaste (320): (Note: Name days today include: "Smaragda" or "Smaragdos" (Emerald), and "Sarantis".) (Note: "GRANT, we beseech thee, Almighty God: that, like as we have known thy glorious Martyrs to be constant in their confession of thy Faith; so we may feel the succour of their loving intercession. Through Christ our Lord. Amen.")

- Cyrion (or Quirio), Candidus, Domnus, Hesychius, Heraclius, Smaragdus, Eunoicus, Valens, Vivianus, Claudius, Priscus, Theodulus, Eutychius, John, Xanthias, Helianus, Sisinius, Angus, Aetius, Flavius, Acacius, Ecdicius, Lysimachus, Alexander, Elias, Gorgonius, Theophilus, Dometian, Gaius, Leontius, Athanasius, Cyril, Sacerdon, Nicholas, Valerius, Philoctimon, Severian, Chudion, Aglaius, and Meliton.

- Saint Caesarius of Nazianzus (Caesarios the Doctor), brother of St. Gregory the Theologian (369)
- Saint Philoromus the Confessor, of Galatia (4th century)
- Righteous Tarasius the Wonderworker, of Lycaonia. (see also March 8 and May 7)

== Pre-Schism Western saints ==
- Saint Pacianus, Bishop of Barcelona (390)
- Saint Constantine of Cornwall and Govan (576) (Note: His feast day is observed on March 9 in the tradition of Cornwall and Wales; and on March 11 in the Scottish and Irish traditions. Two places in Cornwall are still named after him today.) (see also: March 11)
- Saint Bosa of York, Bishop of York (705)
- Venerable Vitalis of Castronovo, Sicily (994) (Note: We ought tentatively to regard it as probable that the saints whose lives have come down to us were really the founders of Greek monasticism in South Italy, and that before their time there were no Greek monasteries in the district. There probably were hermits; but the rise of monasteries does not begin before the end of the ninth century; and the leaders of the monks were Elias Junior (†903), Elias Spelaeotes ("the Cave-Dweller", †c. 960), Lucas of Demena (†984), Vitalis of Castronuovo (†994), and Nilus of Rossano (†1004).)
- Saint Anthony, a monk at Luxeuil in France, became a hermit in Froidemont in Franche-Comté (10th century)

== Post-Schism Orthodox saints ==
- Saint Jonah, archbishop of Novgorod (1470)
- Saint Theodosius Levitsky, priest of Balta, Odessa (1845)
- Saint Dimitra (Ihorova), nun and foundress of the Vvedensk (Vovedenska) Convent in Kiev (1878)

=== New martyrs and confessors ===
- 42 Martyrs of Momišići, two priests and their forty students, martyred by fire by the Ottoman Turks (1688)
- New Hieromartyr Mitrophan Buchnoff, Archpriest, of Voronezh (1931)
- New Hieromartyr Joasaph (Shakhov), Abbot, of Popovka (Moscow) (1938)
- New Hieromartyrs (1938):

- Michael Maslov, Alexis Smirnov, Demetrius Glivenko, Sergius Lebedev, Sergius Zvetkov, Priests;
- Nicholas Goryunov, Protodeacon.

- Virgin-martyrs Natalia Yulianova and Alexandra Samoylovoy (1938)

== Other commemorations ==
- Translation to Vladimir (1230) of the relics of Martyr Abraham of the Bulgars on the Volga (1229)
- "Albazin" Icon of the Most Holy Theotokos ("The Word Was Made Flesh") (1666) (Note: The Albazin Icon of the Mother of God "the Word made Flesh" is of great religious significance in the Amur River region. It received its name from the Russian fortress of Albazin (now the village of Albazino) along the Amur river, founded in the year 1650 by the famous Russian frontier ataman Hierotheus Khabarov on the site of a settlement of the Daurian prince Albaza. For more than 300 years the Wonderworking Albazin Icon of the Mother of God watched over the Amur frontier of Russia.)
- Repose of Elder Cleopas of Ostrov-Vvedensky Monastery (1778) (Note: See: (in Russian) Свято-Введенский Островной монастырь. Википедии. (Russian Wikipedia). -- Ostrov-Vvedensky Monastery.)
- Repose of Schema-Archimandrite Theophilus (Rossokha) of Kiev (1996)

== Icon gallery ==
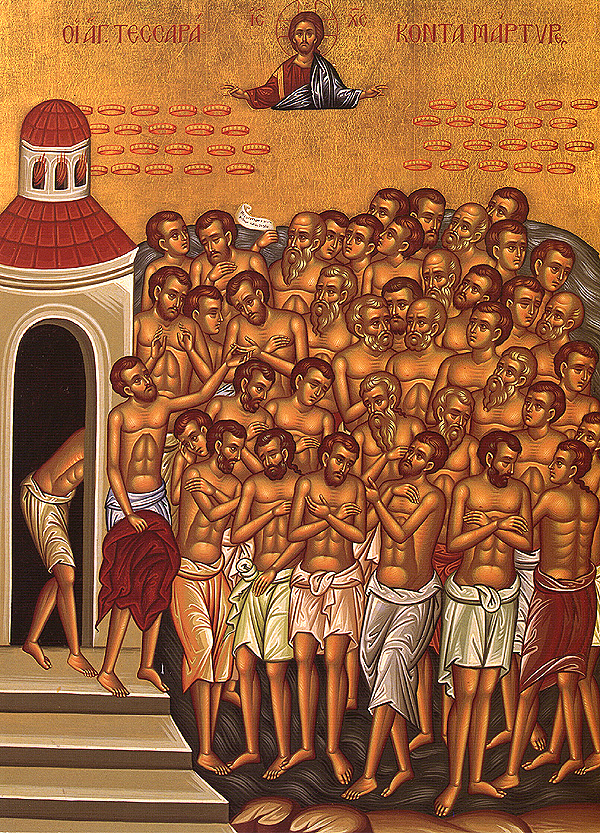
The Holy Forty Martyrs of Sebaste.

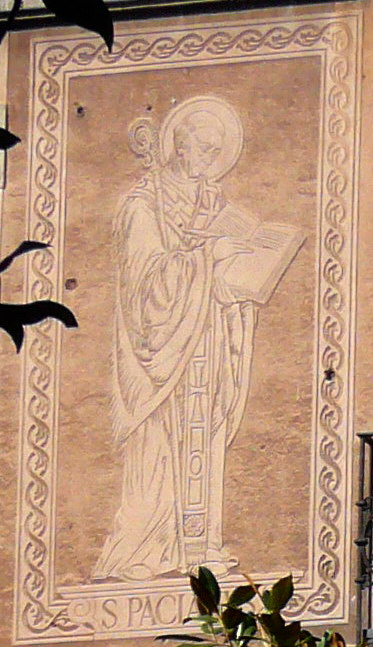
Saint Pacianus in the façade of the bishop's palace in Barcelona, Catalonia.

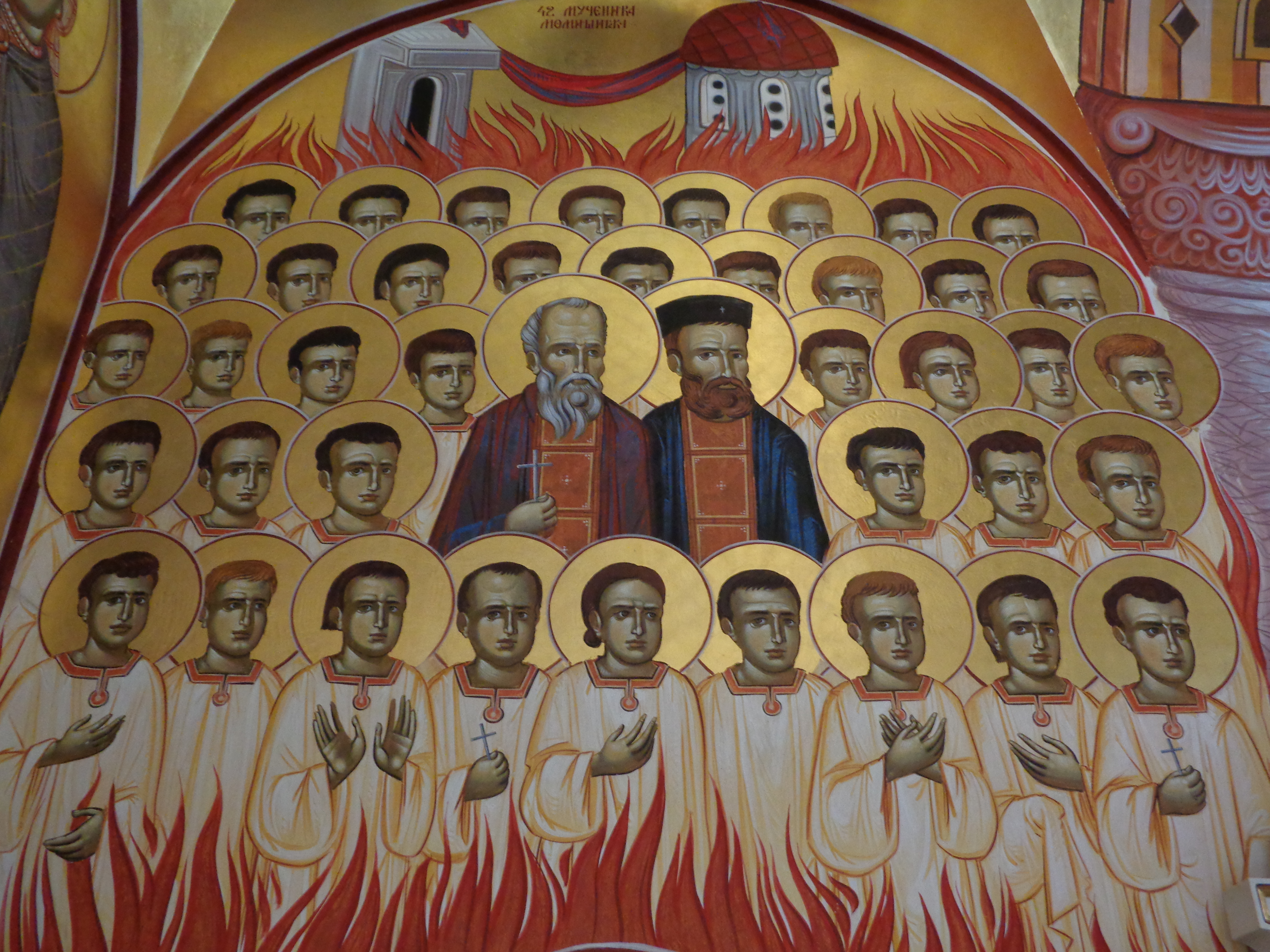
Holy 42 Martyrs of Momišići, Montenegro.

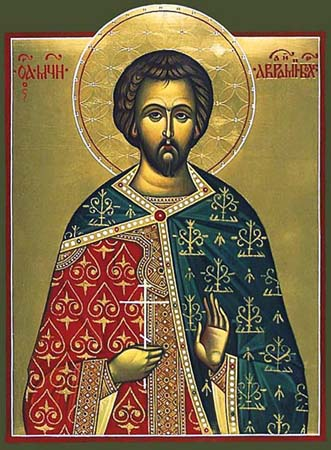
St. Abraham of Bulgaria.

== Sources ==
- March 9/March 22. Orthodox Calendar (PRAVOSLAVIE.RU).
- March 22 / March 9. HOLY TRINITY RUSSIAN ORTHODOX CHURCH (A parish of the Patriarchate of Moscow).
- March 9. OCA - The Lives of the Saints.
- The Autonomous Orthodox Metropolia of Western Europe and the Americas (ROCOR). St. Hilarion Calendar of Saints for the year of our Lord 2004. St. Hilarion Press (Austin, TX). p. 20.
- March 9. Latin Saints of the Orthodox Patriarchate of Rome.
- The Roman Martyrology. Transl. by the Archbishop of Baltimore. Last Edition, According to the Copy Printed at Rome in 1914. Revised Edition, with the Imprimatur of His Eminence Cardinal Gibbons. Baltimore: John Murphy Company, 1916. pp. 70–71.

Greek Sources

- Great Synaxaristes: (in Greek) 9 ΜΑΡΤΙΟΥ. ΜΕΓΑΣ ΣΥΝΑΞΑΡΙΣΤΗΣ.
- (in Greek) Συναξαριστής. 9 Μαρτίου. ECCLESIA.GR. (H ΕΚΚΛΗΣΙΑ ΤΗΣ ΕΛΛΑΔΟΣ).

Russian Sources

- (in Russian) 22 марта (9 марта). Православная Энциклопедия под редакцией Патриарха Московского и всея Руси Кирилла (электронная версия). (Orthodox Encyclopedia - Pravenc.ru).
- (in Russian) 9 марта (ст.ст.) 22 марта 2013 (нов. ст.). Русская Православная Церковь Отдел внешних церковных связей. (DECR).
