= San Giovanni Theristis =

Coordinates: 38°29′41″N 16°28′16″E

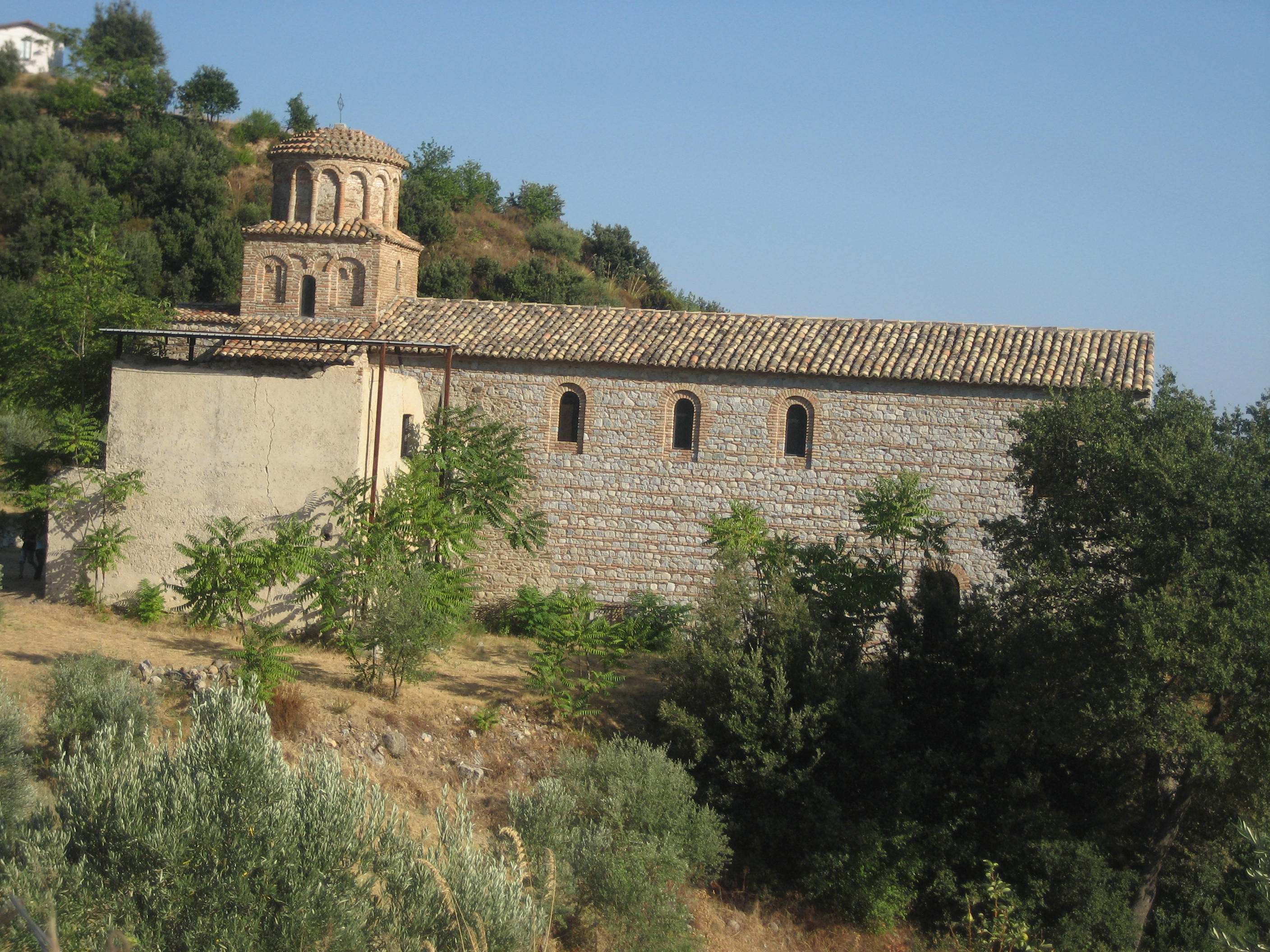
View of the restored side of the monastery.

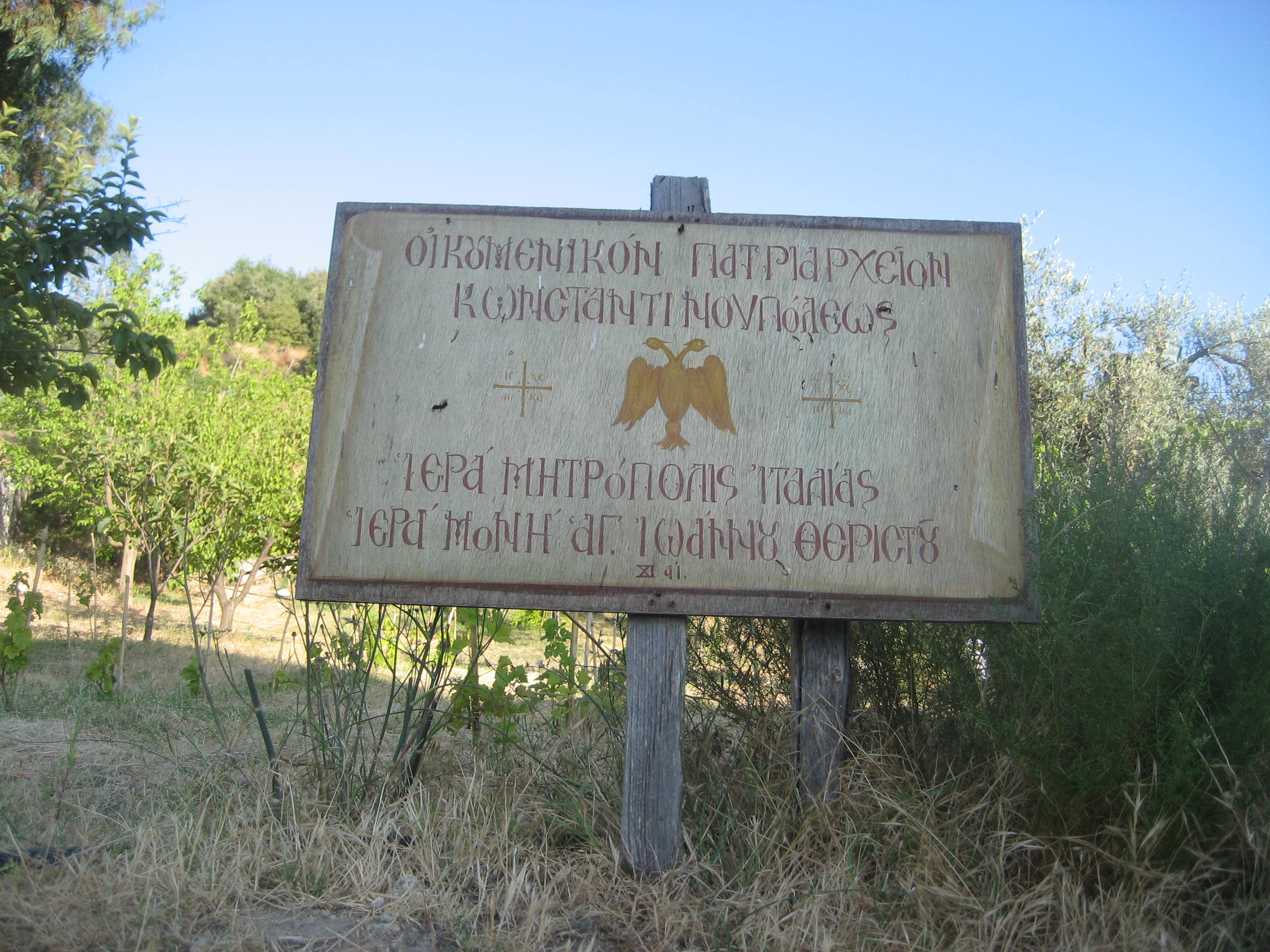
Sign in Greek language.

The Monastery of San Giovanni Theristis (Greek: Ιερά Μονή Αγίου Ιωάννη του Θεριστή), is an Orthodox Christian monastery in Bivongi, Calabria (province of Reggio), southern Italy. It is part of the Romanian Orthodox Diocese for Italy.

== History ==
Calabria was part of the Byzantine Empire until the 11th century. A Greco-Italian (Byzantine) monk, St. John Theristus, lived in the Stilaro Valley during the 9th century. His aghiasma ("holy font") became a popular center of local pilgrimage, and here a Byzantine monastery was founded in the 11th century. After the Norman conquest of southern Italy, it developed as one of the most important Basilian monasteries in southern Italy, maintaining its splendour until the 15th century, with a rich library and numerous art treasures.

It lived a phase of decline until 1579, when the founding of the Basilian Order of Italy restored it as the main Basilian center in southern Calabria. However, in the 17th century brigandage damaged the monastery, and the monks decided to move to a bigger monastery outside the walls of Stilo, carrying with them the relics of the namesake saint. In the early 19th century, after the Napoleonic conquest of the Kingdom of the Two Sicilies, it was acquired by the comune of Bivongi, who sold it to private owners. In 1980 it was sold back to the municipal authority and, in the 1990s, restored to the Italian Basilian Order. In 2001, the Patriarch of Constantinople Bartholomew I visited the monastery and returned here the saint's relic from Stilo.

In July 2008, the city council of Bivongi has granted the use of the church for 99 years to the newly formed Romanian Orthodox Church in Italy.

== Description ==
The edifice is an example of transition between the Byzantine and Norman styles in architecture in southern Italy. Norman elements include the four corner pilasters closed by four arches, which support the dome, two of them being ogival.

Clearly Byzantine is the exterior, in particular in the external walls, in the fake columns of the apse, which forms ogival arches, and in the 16 small columns decorating the dome's tambour. The interior also houses traces of Byzantine frescoes, such as that portraying St. John Theristis.
