= John Theristus =

Italian Benedictine monk

Saint John Theristus OSB
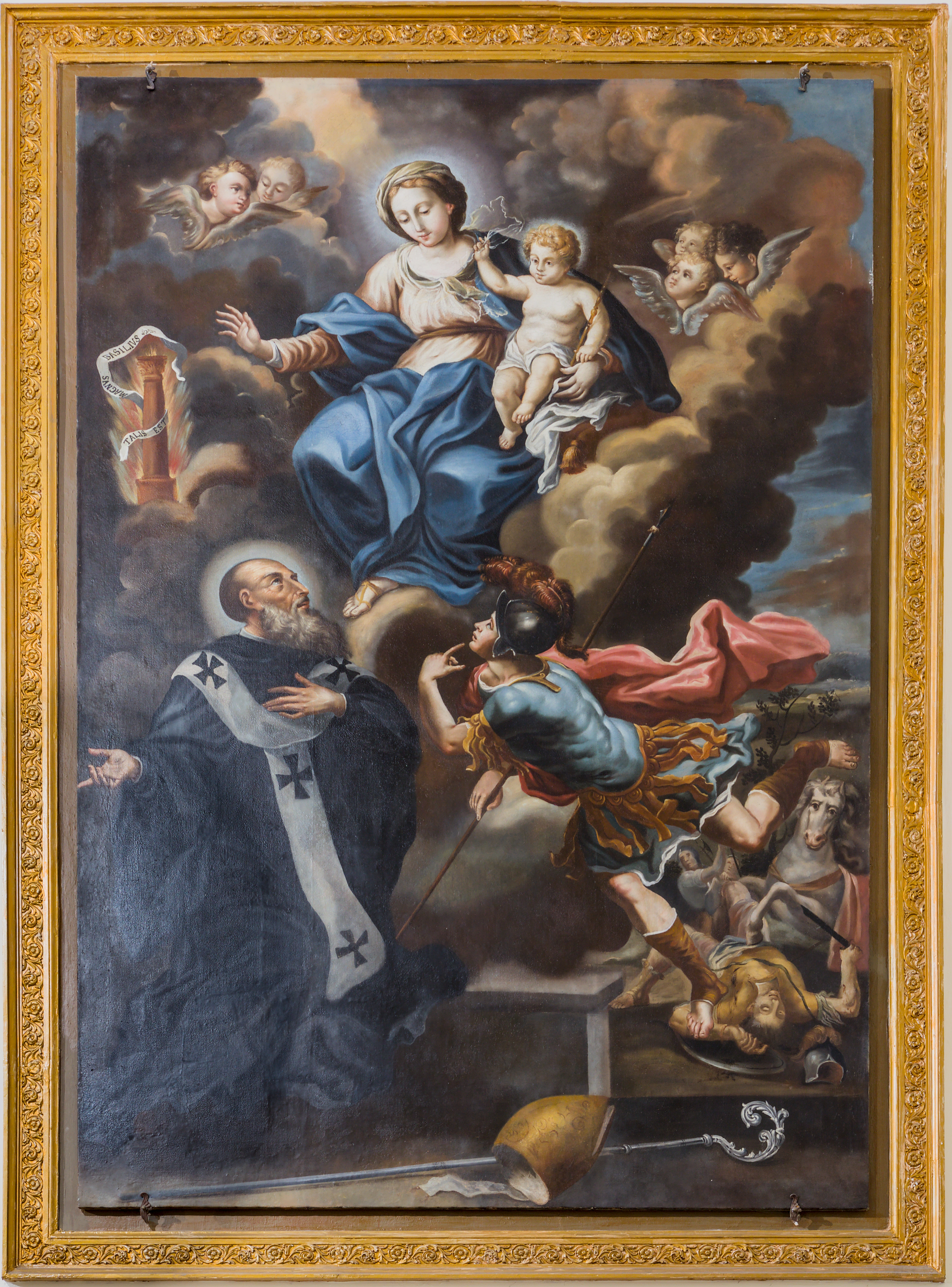
- Born: 1049; Palermo, Emirate of Sicily
- Died: 1129; Stilo, Calabria, County of Sicily
- Venerated in: Roman Catholic Church; Eastern Orthodox Church
- Feast: 23 February, Eastern Orthodox, Roman Catholic; 24 February, in Stilo and Bivongi

History of San Giovanni Therestis (John Theristus) in Italian

John Theristus, OSB (Italian: Giovanni Theristis, "John the Harvester"; Sicilian: Santu Juanni (Teristi); 1049–1129 AD) was an Italian Byzantine Benedictine monk. Despite dying almost a century after the Great Schism of 1054, he is notably a saint in both the Catholic and Eastern Orthodox Churches. The details of his life have been handed down by legends and popular beliefs.

== Life ==
John's father, Arconte di Cursano, a Byzantine farmer near Botterio Signore in the territory of Stylus, was killed in a Saracen raid on the coasts of Calabria. His Calabrian mother was captured by Saracens and brought to Palermo, where she gave birth. He grew up in the Christian faith in a Muslim environment. At the age of 14, he was encouraged by his mother to flee to his native country. He crossed the Strait of Messina in a boat without oars or sail, and reached Monasterace. The inhabitants, seeing him dressed as a Moor, took him to the Bishop, who interrogated him. The boy answered that he was seeking baptism, but the bishop subjected him to harsh trials before giving him his name.

Once he grew up, he felt more and more attracted to the life of the monks who lived in the caves around Stylus, fascinated by the example of two Basilian ascetics, Ambrose and Nicholas. After much insistence, despite his young age, he was admitted into the community. He distinguished himself by virtue, so much so that he was later elected abbot. He found in Cursano a treasure that belonged to his family, and following the rule of Saint Basil he distributed it to the poor.

Once in June, at harvest time, he went to visit at Monasterace a knight who had provided food for the monastery. He took with him a flask of wine and some bread. When he arrived at two fields, called Marone and Maturavolo, he offered the farmers the bread and wine. A furious storm rose up, risking destruction of the harvest, but through John's prayer the storm held off until the wheat be harvested and gathered in sheaves. Thus he helped to miraculously harvest a large crop ahead of destructive weather, saving the locals from starvation. This and other episodes testifying to the help given to the farmers, earned him the nickname of Therìstis, that is "reaper". The owner of the fields, struck by the incident, donated them to the monastery.

== Veneration ==
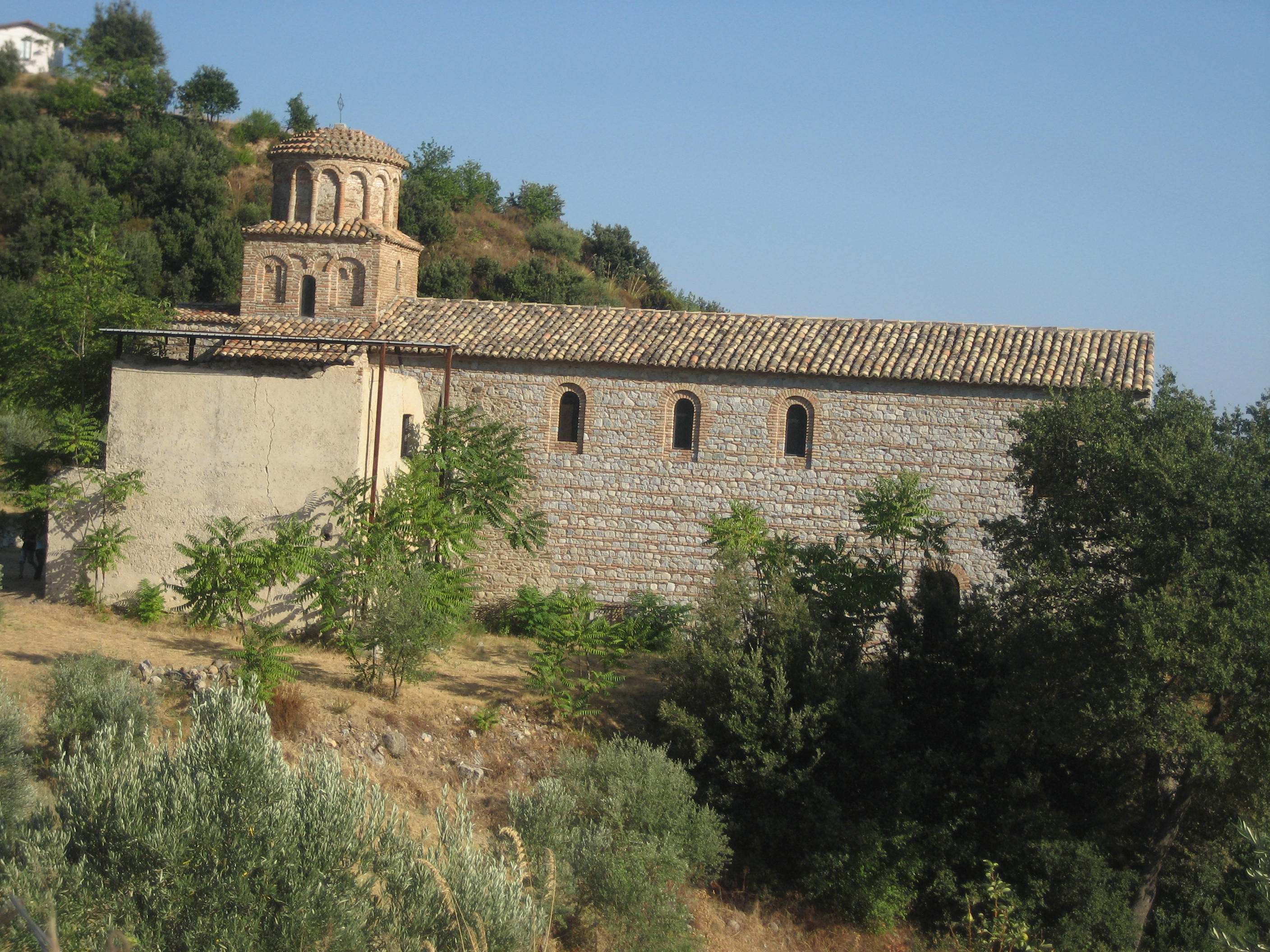
View of the restored side of the monastery.

According to tradition, King Roger, suffering from an incurable wound on his face, was healed upon contact with John's tunic and many others were healed: crippled, blind, deaf, and demonic. Roger II then founded the monastery of St. John in Nemore (del Bosco), named after John Theristus.

The memory of John Theristus is found in all Greek menologies and synaxarions of the Eastern Orthodox and Byzantine Catholic liturgies. It also entered the Roman Martyrology of the Catholic Church on 23 February.

In 1660 Pope Alexander VIII had his body transferred to Stylus to avoid the raids of brigands and earthquakes. On 12 March 1662, together with the relics of Saints Ambrose and Nicholas, the remains were placed in a church built by the Minim Fathers and later purchased by the Basilians, who dedicated it as the monastery of San Giovanni Teristi. In 1791 it passed to the Redemptorists, who embellished the church and convent with marble works. In the left aisle, under the altar, are venerated the relics of Teristi and his fellow monks. The convent is accessed through a marble portal worked in marble. In the centre of the cloister stands an ancient well in pink granite with four columns, covered by a canopy surmounted by a tin ship, with a praying child holding a cross inside, in memory of the young John's miraculous journey by sea.
