= Heloris =

Syracusan exile and adoptive father of Dionysius I of Syracuse

Hélōris (Ancient Greek: Ἕλωρις), was a Syracusan exile from Magna Graecia, who fought against his adoptive son, the tyrant Dionysius I of Syracuse.

== Life ==
After the Second Sicilian War ended in 405 BC, Dionysius decided to focus his attention on securing Syracuse's borders, launching a campaign against neighboring Herbessus and calling for a levy of citizens to serve in the army. Once the Syracusans were armed, a mutiny rose to challenge Dionysius's selection as tyrant. Dionysius was faced with fight or flee situation among his closest advisers. Heloris is famously attributed to have uttered a remark that was quoted to late antiquity:

Tyranny is a beautiful shroud.

Once a close friend or perhaps even adoptive father of Dionysius, he was banished for unknown reasons by Dionysius. During the Third Sicilian War, Rhegium had allied itself with Carthage against Syracuse because Syracuse was a rival in Magna Graecia and both wanted to control the Strait of Messina.Determined to control the Strait of Messina located between Messene and Rhegium, Dionysius resettled Messene and Medma with Italian Greeks from Locri and Messenians from Naupactus and Zacynthus respectively. However, he relocated the Messenians to Tyndaris located further west in the coast, to avoid upsetting the Spartans.

Afterwards Dionysius captured cities of Sicels. The citizens of Rhegium, despite being fearful of the with tyrant, offered asylum to his opponents, sponsoring the refugees of Naxos and Catana and resettling them at Mylae, west of the Strait of Messina. During the period the exiled Syracusan general Heloris was assigned to besiege the city of Messene in 393. However, he was defeated by the mercenaries of Dionysius. The mercenaries from Messene then attacked and captured Mylae. The refugees of Naxos who had been resettled in Mylae were allowed to leave and settle elsewhere. In revenge Dionysius invaded Rhegium around 394 BC. Heloris successfully defended Rhegium against the siege with such an energy that forces of Dionysius were made to flee. When Syracuse and Carthage had secured peace with each other, Dionysius wanted revenge on Rhegium, hence he reinvaded Rhegium. After a protracted siege, Dionysius managed to take Rhegium in 386 BC and sold the inhabitants into slavery. He also attacked its allied cities in Tarentum, Magna Graecia of Italiote League in mainland.

== Last days ==
After arriving in Italy, with a force of 20,000 men, 3000 horses, and fleet of 40 galleys, Dionysius decided to lay siege to Caulonia a strong city of Locri.To force Dionysius into relaxing his siege, Heloris decided to leave his camp and marched north towards Eleporus with his army numbering 25,000 infantry and 2,000 cavalrymen mostly composed of other Syracusan exiles, Dionysius then lifted the siege and decided to march his army to Eleporus 7 km (4.3 mi) away from the enemy. The two armies were ignorant of each other's whereabouts until Dionysius acquired intelligence about Heloris's whereabouts from one of his scouts. Exploiting the advantage he ordered his forces to surprise attack the enemy at the dawn. Dionysius used his overwhelming numerical superiority to form a tight noose around their group. The disorganized and scattered forces of Heloris become easy prey to Dionysius's well organized phalanx, the Greeks fled after hearing that their leader Heloris had fallen, the fleeing Greeks sought refuge on a hill, but were surrounded by Dionysius later 10,000 Greeks surrendered. Dionysius had now successfully conquered southern Italy (Magna Graecia) Strait of Messina and Toe of Italy, while crushing the Italiote (Greek) League and Heloris at the Battle of the Elleporus, Rhegium was punished and made to surrender 70 warships and 300 talents in tribute.
