= Punta Stilo =

Headland in Calabria, Italy

Punta Stilo (Italian for "Cape of Columns") is the name of an arcuate headland in Calabria, Italy. It lies immediately north of Monasterace (the site of ancient Caulonia) and constitutes the western coast of the Gulf of Squillace. Pliny the Elder refers to it by the name Cocynthum. The names Punta Stilo and Stilida were mentioned for the first time in the Itinerarium maritimum which dates to the late fifth century AD.

== History ==
During the Second World War, 30 miles east of Punta Stilo on 9 July 1940, the Battle of Punta Stilo took place between the Italian and British navies. It was one of the few pitched battles of the Mediterranean campaign during World War II involving large numbers of ships on both sides. The clash was indecisive, though both sides claimed victory.
