= Monasterace Archeological Museum =

Museo Archeologico di Monasterace
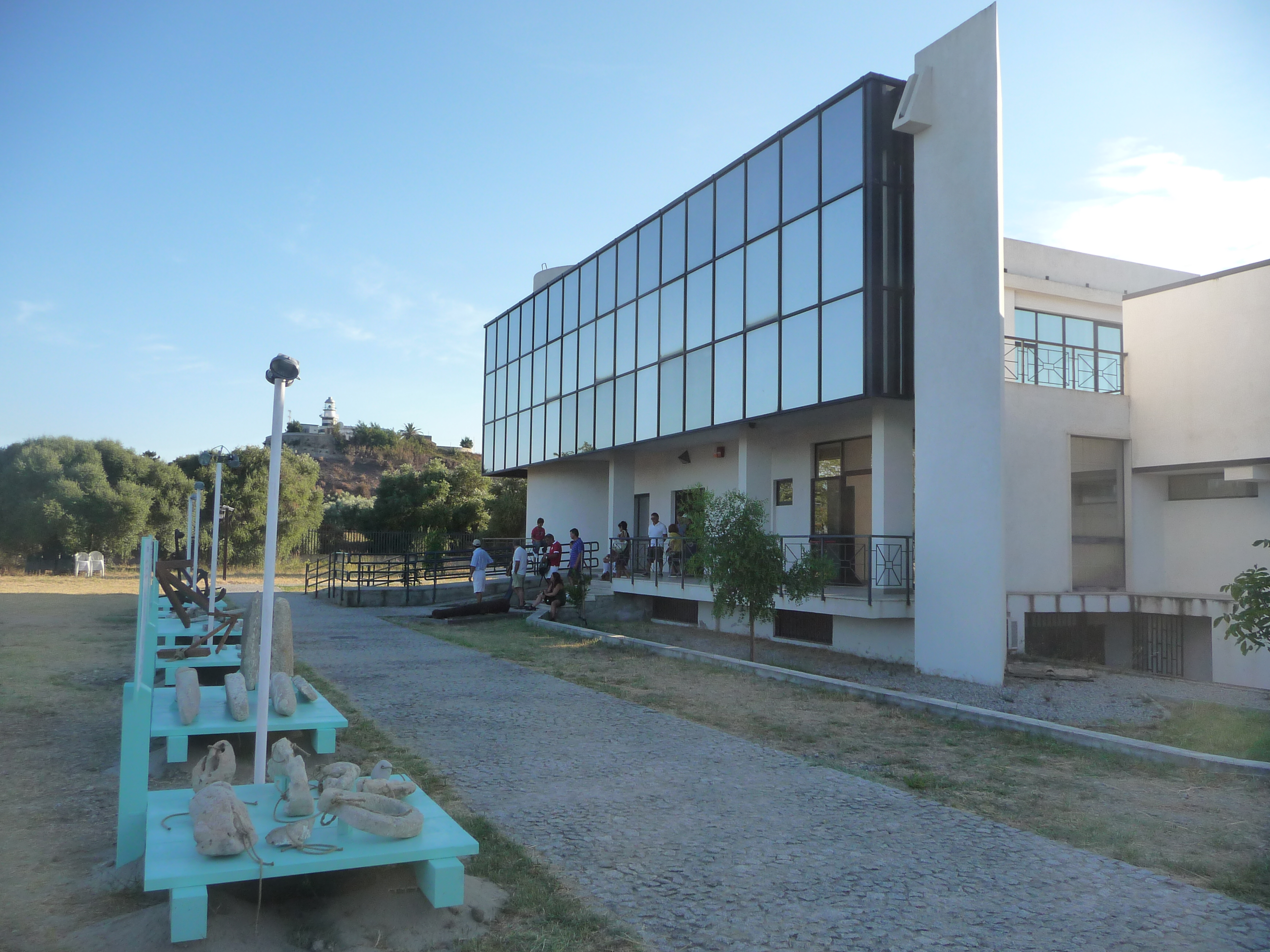
- Museum entrance

- Location within Italy
- Location: S.S. 106, 89040 Monasterace marina, Italy
- Coordinates: 38°27′01″N 16°34′44″E
- Collection size: Archeology
- Website: www.comune.monasterace.rc.it/index.php?action=index&p=223

The Museo Archeologico di Monasterace (Monasterace Archeological Museum) is a museum in Monasterace, southern Italy. It houses a collection of finds from the ancient Greek city Caulonia whose archaeological site is located close to the museum.

== Gallery ==
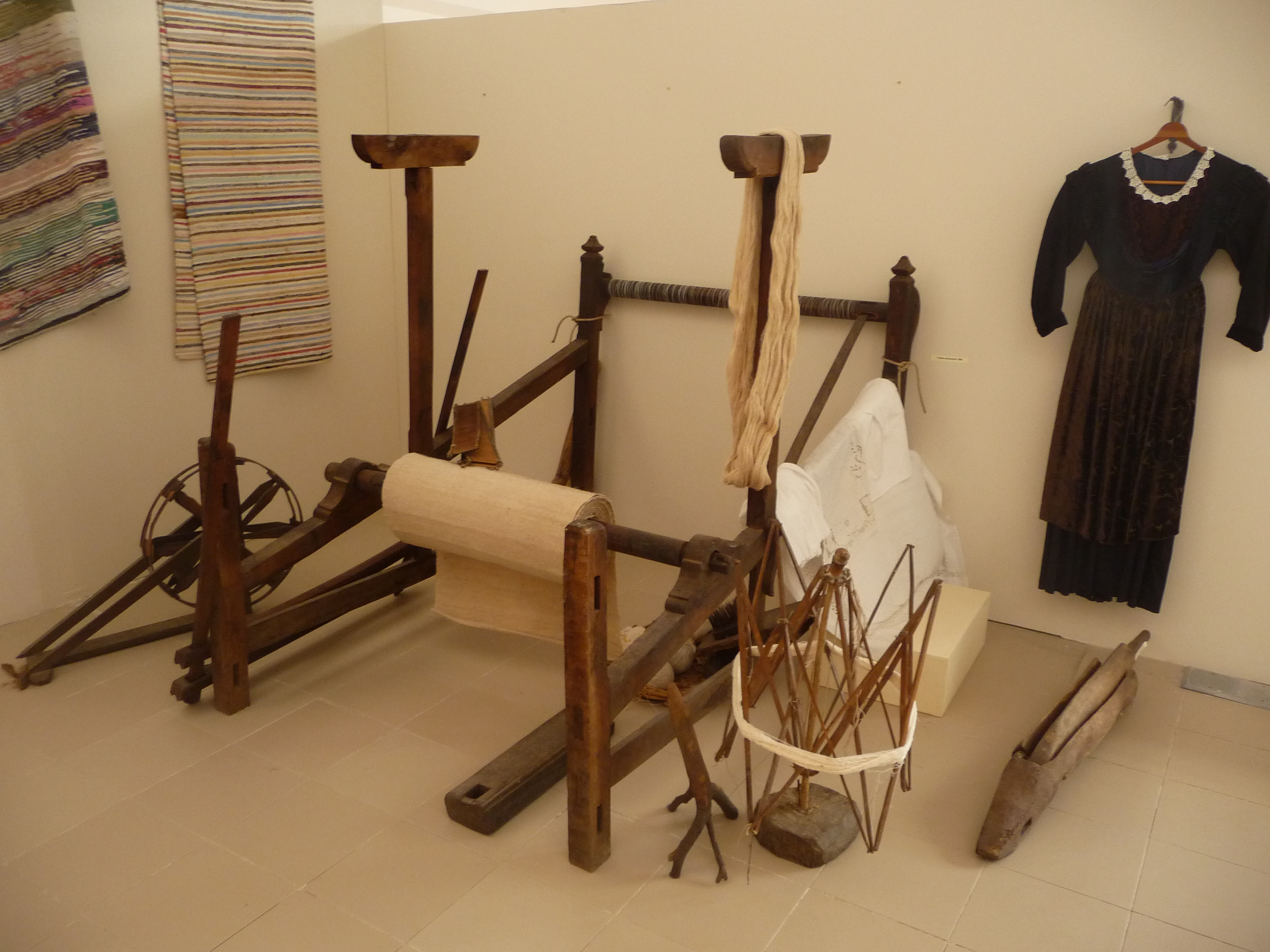
The historical equipment of a tailor

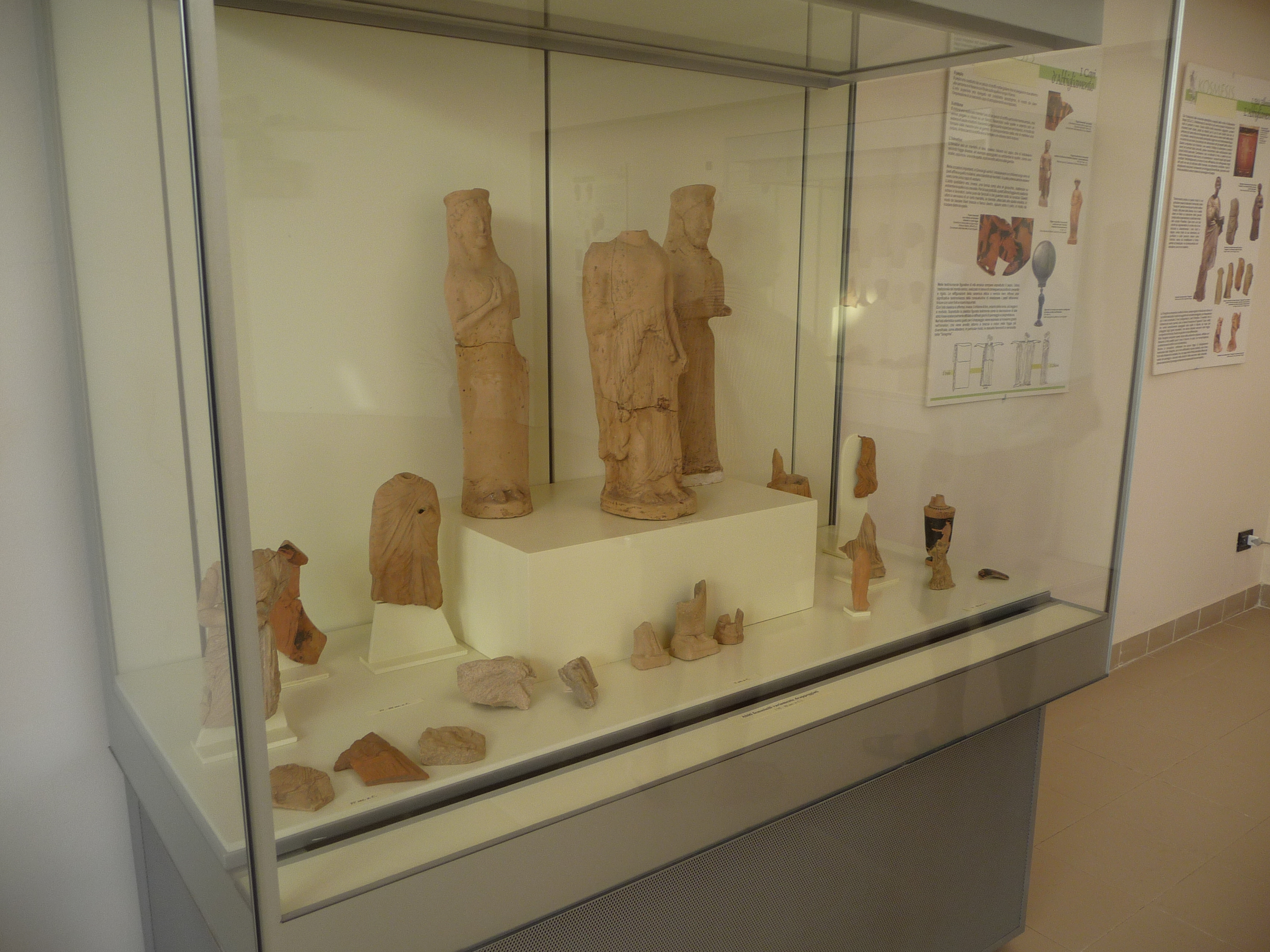
Archaeological finds

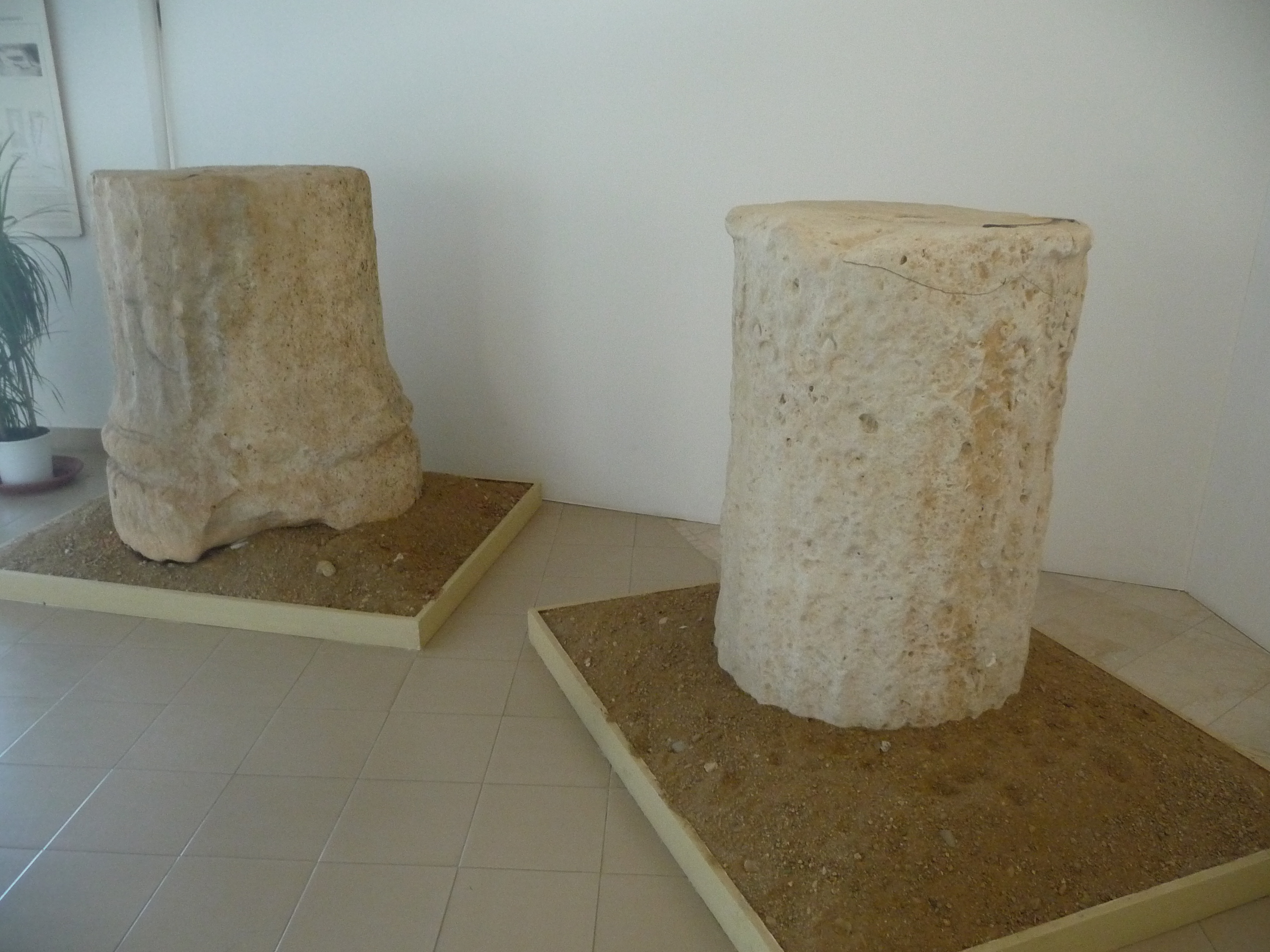
Remains of an ancient column from Caulonia

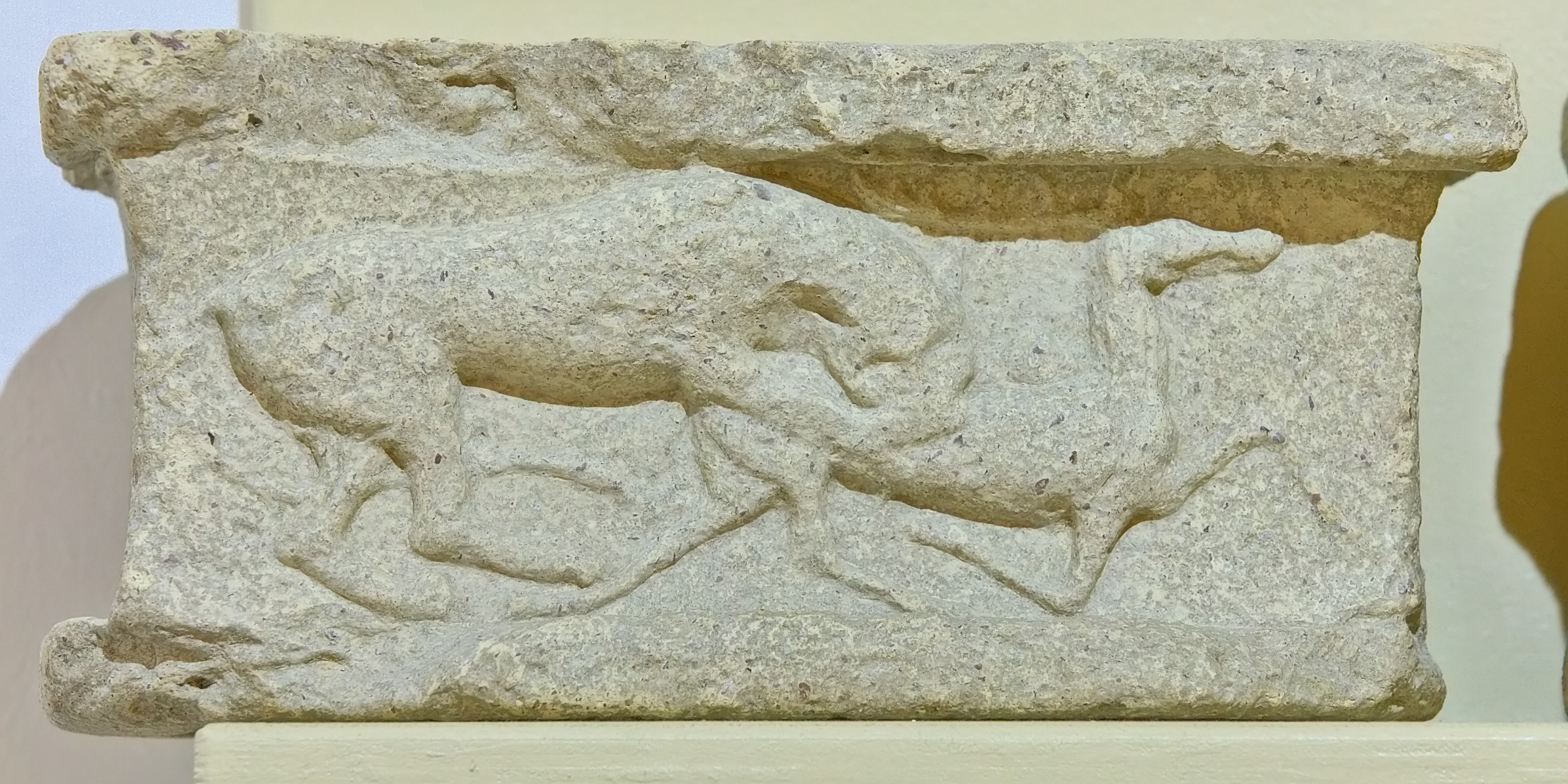
Arula (altar) depicting animals fighting, 5th century BC

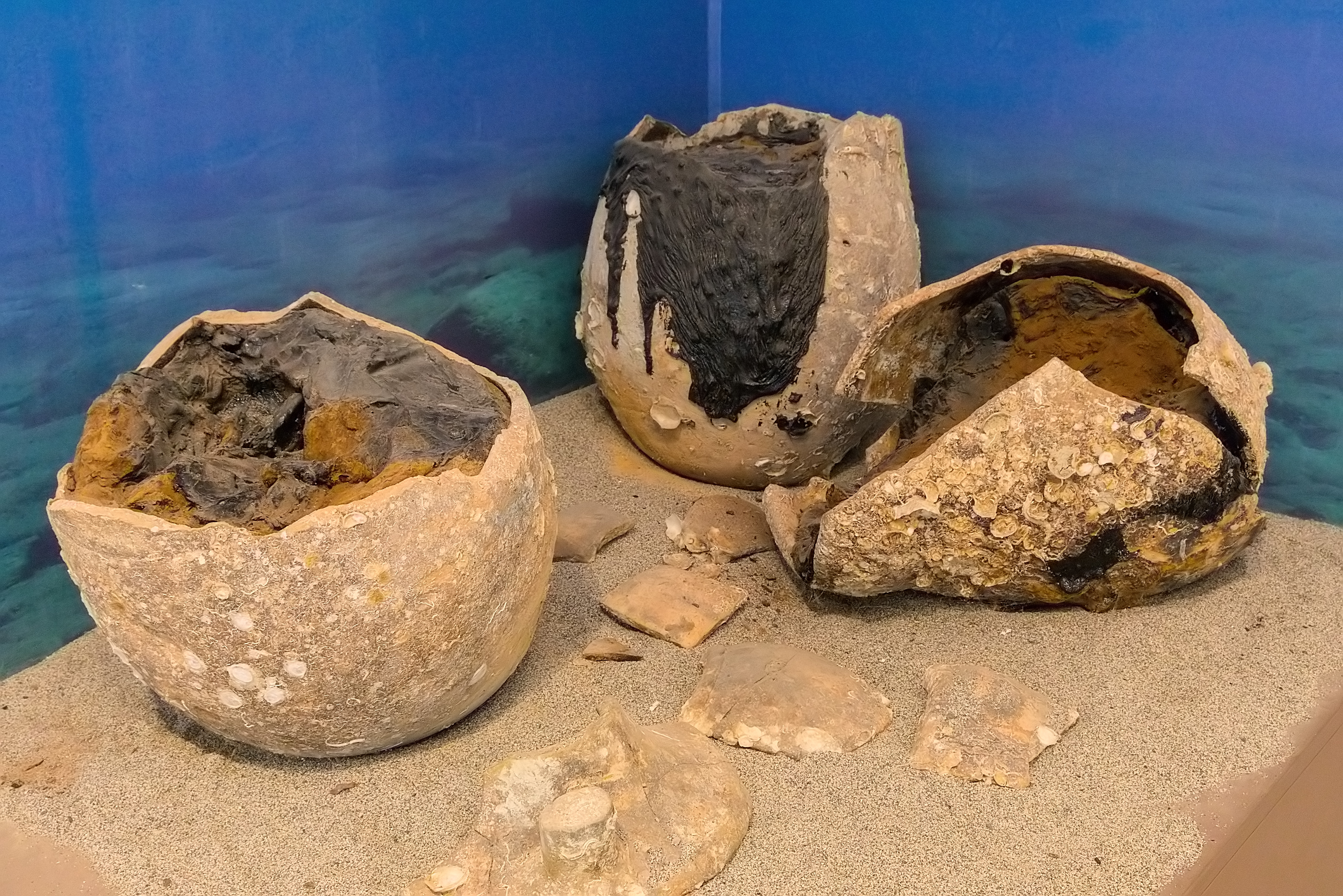
"Kadoi" (fish containers) found in Kaulonia, 1st century BC / 1st century AD

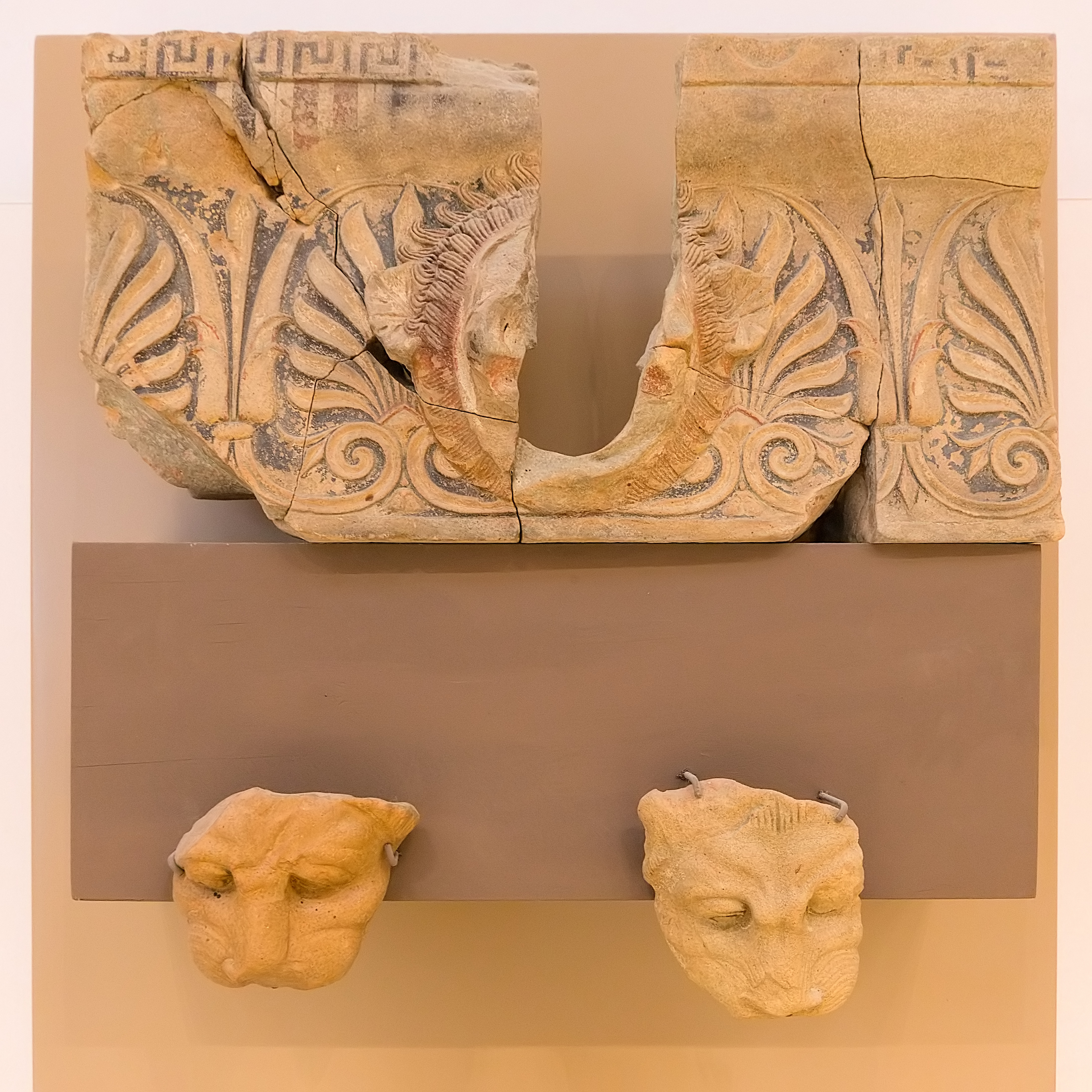
Elements from the Punta Stilo sanctuary, 5th century BC

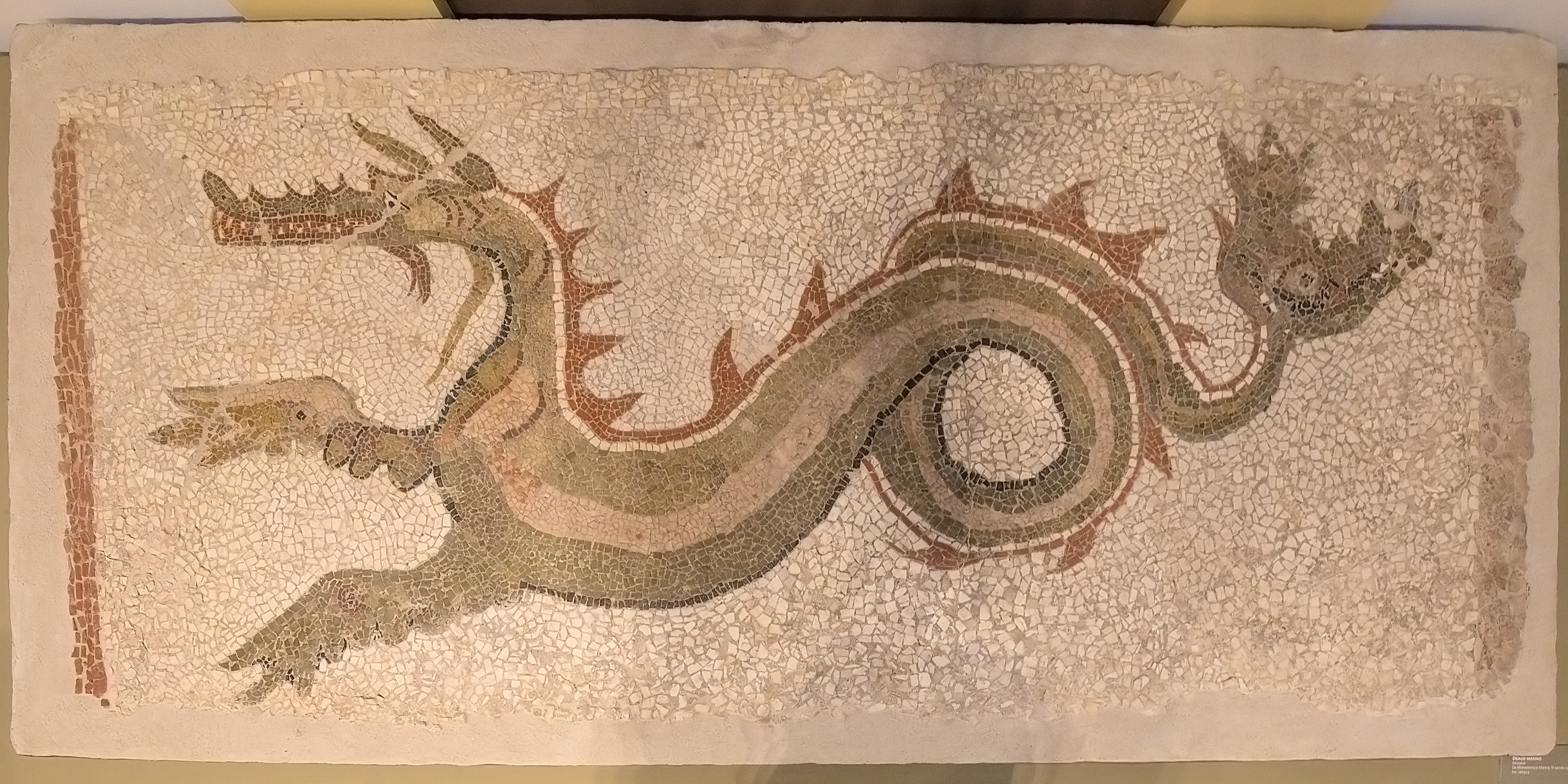
Mosaic depicting a sea dragon, 3rd century BC
