= Siege of Rhegium =

387 BC siege by a Syracusan force

Date	387 BC
Location	Rhegium, Calabria
Result	Syracusan victory

Belligerents
Syracuse	Rhegium

Commanders and leaders
Dionysius I of Syracuse	

The siege of Rhegium was undertaken in 387 BC by a Syracusan force against the city of Rhegium. The Syracusans were led by the tyrant Dionysius I. Dionysius took the city, and sold its inhabitants into slavery.

Rhegium had allied with Carthage against Syracuse during the Third Sicilian War because Syracuse was a rival in Magna Graecia and both wanted to control the Strait of Messina. Now that Syracuse and Carthage had secured peace, Dionysius wanted revenge on Rhegium. Dionysius invaded the mainland crushing Rhegium’s ally, the Italiote League of Taurentum, at the Battle of the Elleporus. He then besieged, captured and sacked Rhegium, selling its inhabitants into slavery. Rhegium would eventually be re-founded by Dionysius II.
