= Italiote league =

Ancient league of Greek city-states in southern Italy

Ancient Greek colonies and their dialect groupings in Magna Graecia

The Italiote League of city-states was founded in about 430 BC by several Greek Achaean colonies in southern Italy.

This region of Italiotes (Italian Greek-speakers) was part of what was later called Magna Graecia by the Romans.

== History ==
It was formed probably to protect the cities from incursions by the Lucanians, a new and formidable enemy who defeated the army of Thurii in 390 BC. It consisted of at least Kroton, Kaulon, Thurii, Metapontum, Elea, Hipponion, Rhegion, Poseidonia, Taras and Heraclea.

Polybius and Diodorus each describe a league of Italiote city-states in the 5th and 4th centuries BC, and it is usually accepted that they describe the same league. However, it may be that two different leagues existed, and Polybius's league, founded in 430 BC by three Achaean states, was established to counter their aggressive Italiote neighbours (Thurii and Locri), who were supported by major powers. Diodorus may describe another league, or a reorganised one, founded in 393 BC by a larger group of Italiote states, to counter a different set of enemies, especially Dionysius I of Syracuse supported by the Lucanians.

Kroton was the first leader of the league from about 430 BC, as shown by its coinage. Taras took over control of the League after Dionysius I's capture of Kroton in 379 BC, which it retained for more than a century. The league festival was relocated to Heraclea, a Tarantine colony.

Dionysius I conquered southern Italy (Magna Graecia), crushing the Italiote League at the Battle of the Elleporus in 389 BC, and destroying Rhegium after the Siege of Rhegium in 387 BC. However, the Italiote League continued to exist until at least the Pyrrhic War in 278 BC.
