= Stilaro =

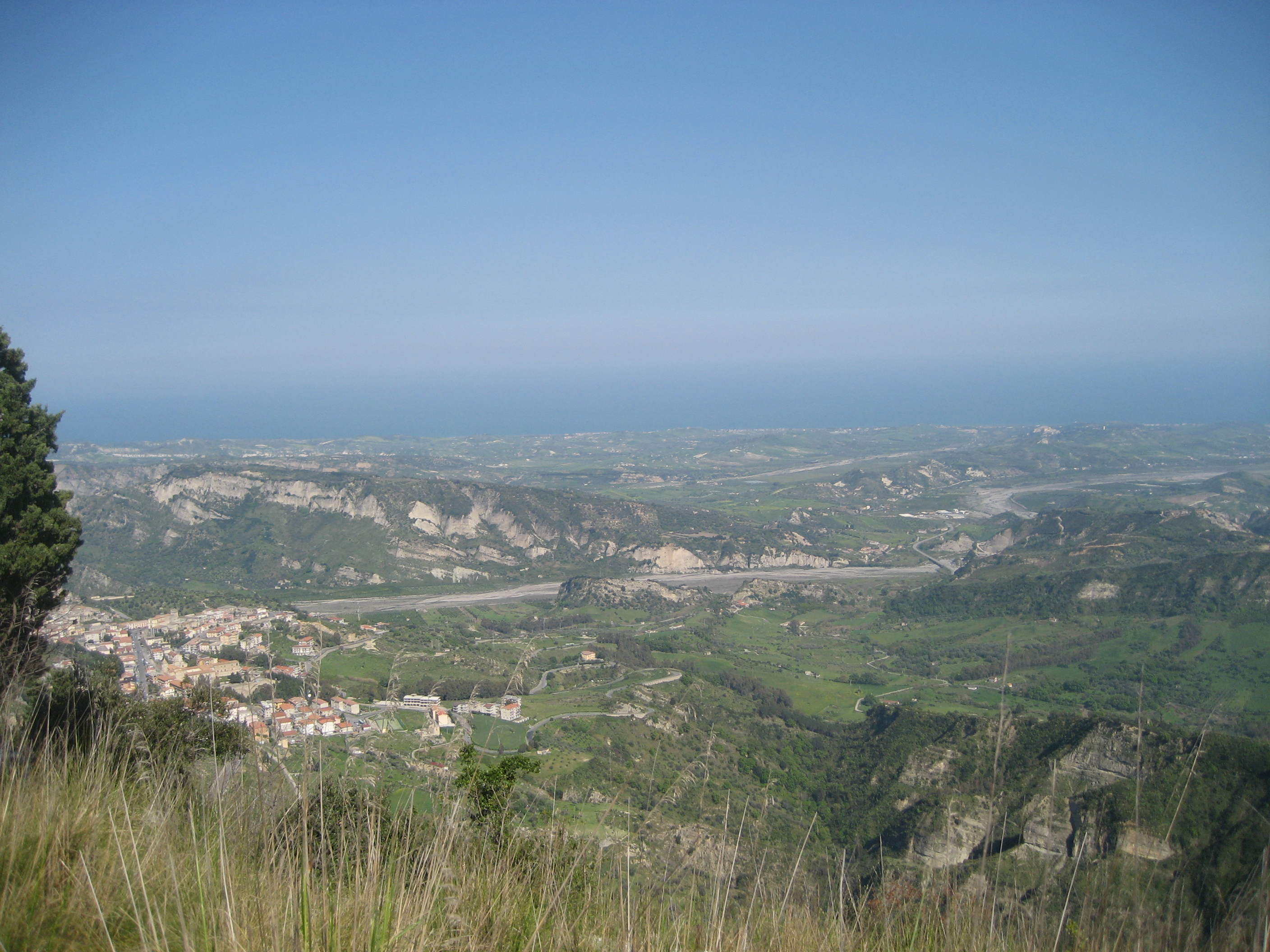

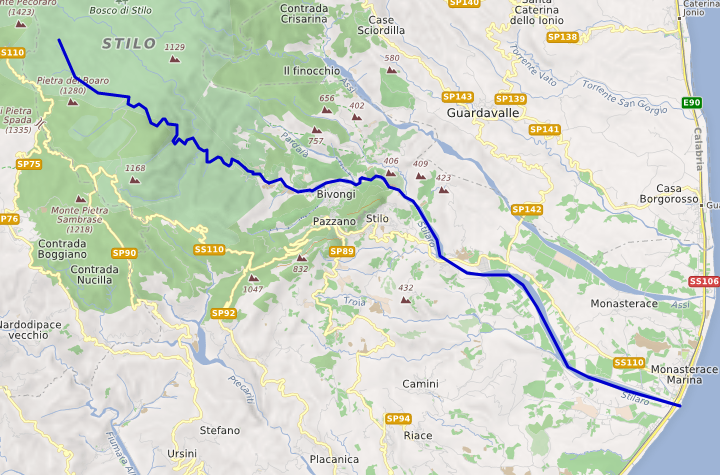

Location
- Country: Italy

Physical characteristics
- Source
  - elevation: 1,400 m (4,600 ft)
- Mouth: Ionian Sea
  - coordinates: 38°25′34″N 16°34′16″E
  - elevation: 0 m (0 ft)
- Length: 59.17 km (36.77 mi)
- Basin size: 95.04 km^{2} (36.70 sq mi)

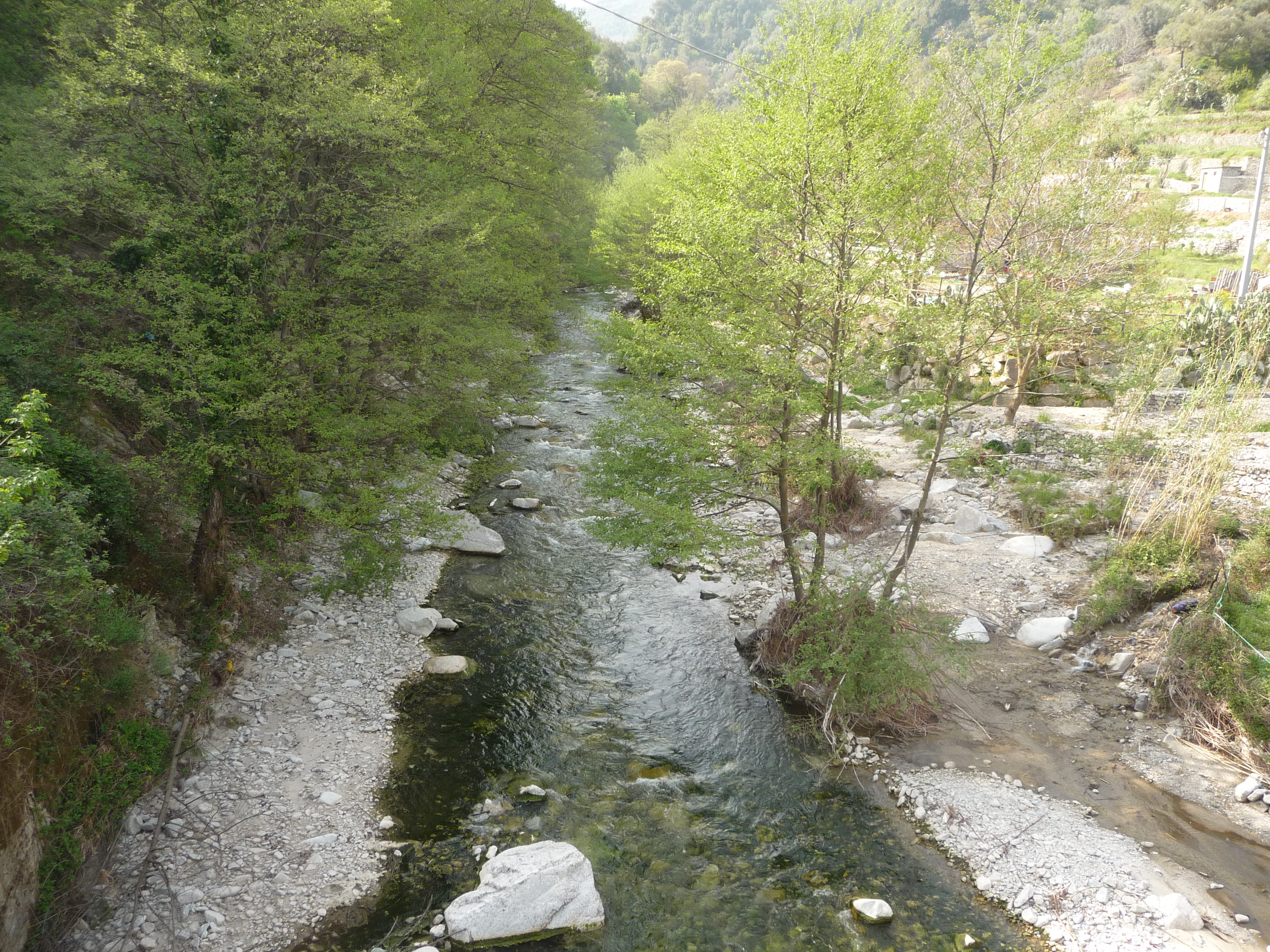
Stilaro in spring

The Stilaro (in antiquity the Elleporus or possibly Elleporos; in Calabrian dialect Stilaru) is an Italian river, which runs through Bivongi, Pazzano and Stilo in the Province of Reggio Calabria, Calabria and, along with the river, gives its name to the Vallata dello Stilaro Allaro, the valley through which it flows. It is 59.17 km long.

Along the river there are remains of iron works, which arose with the industrialization of the area, mills and two hydroelectric plants.

In 389 BC, the Battle of the Elleporus was alongside the river.

== Tributaries ==
- Cellia
- Melodare
- Pardalà
- Torrente Ruggero
- Torrente Folea

Marmarico fall

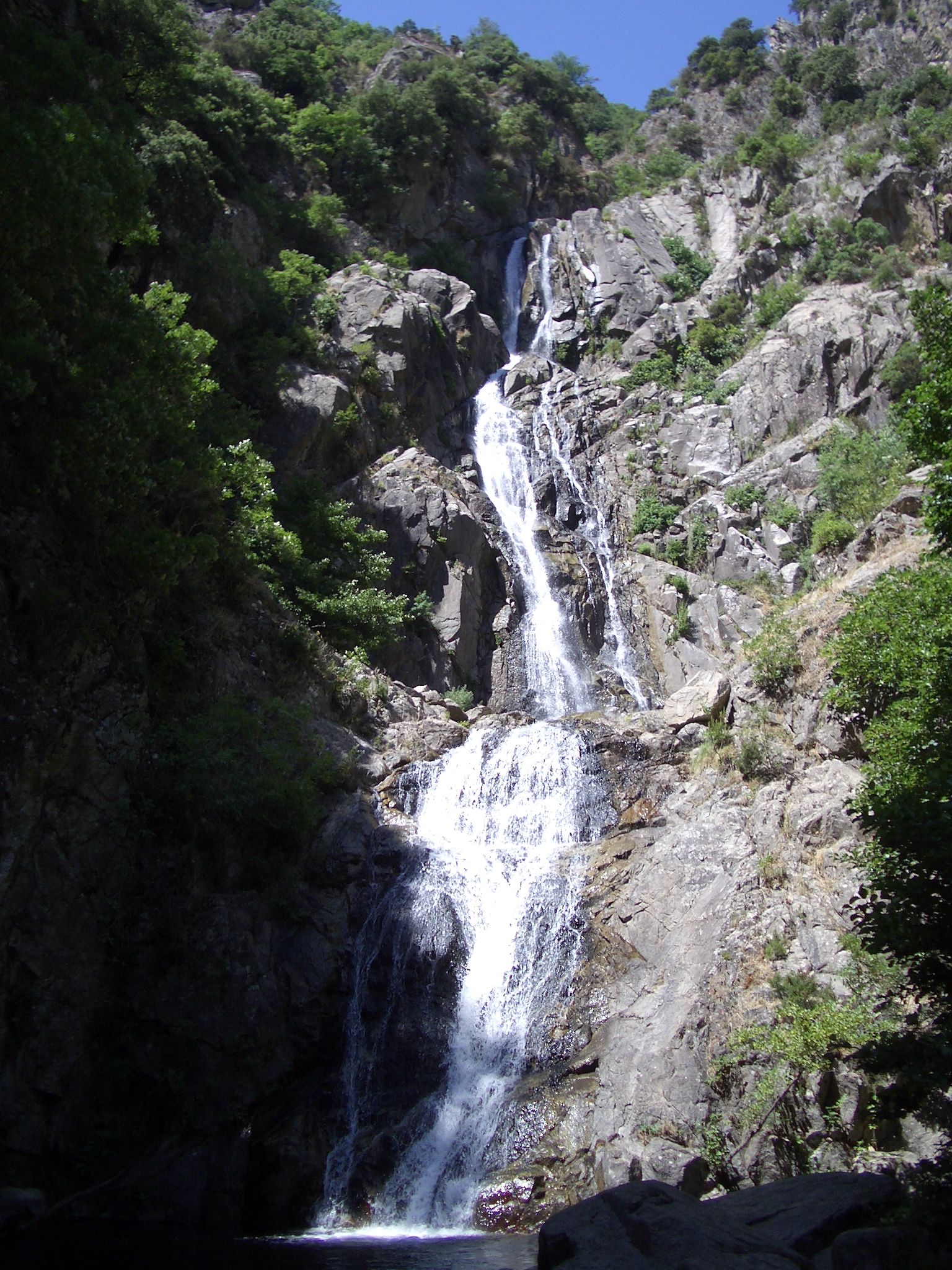
Cascata del Marmarico (Marmarico Fall)

== Cascata del Marmarico ==
A significant feature of the river is the Cascata del Marmarico which, at 114 metres, is the tallest waterfall both in the region of Calabria and in the Southern Apennines. Its name, Marmarico means “slow” and “heavy”, perhaps deriving from the fact that the water seems to hang in motionless threads.
