= Caulonia (ancient city) =

Ancient Italian city

- Ancient Greek: Καυλωνία, romanized: Kaulōnía
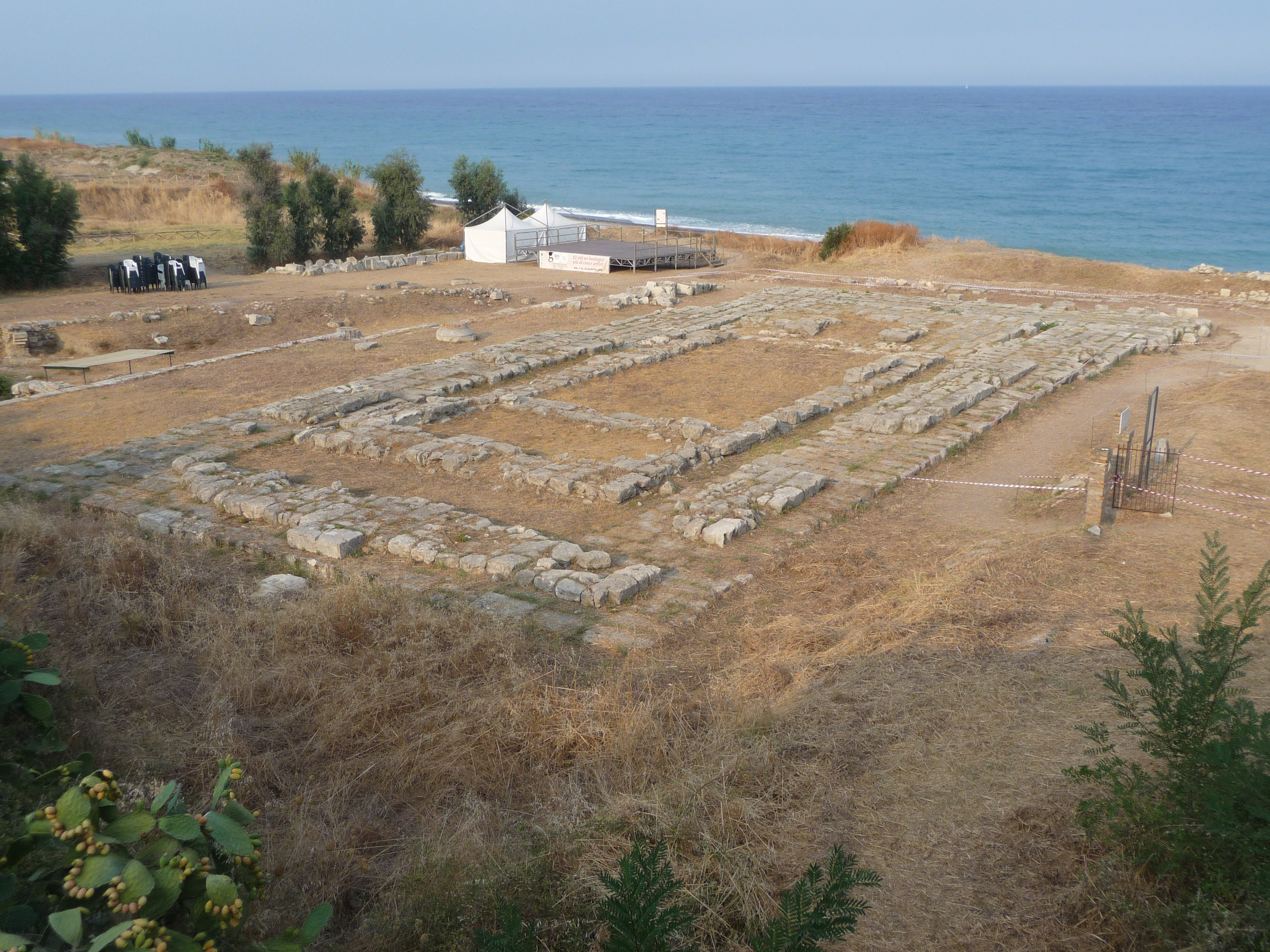
- Ruins of a Doric temple at the site of ancient Caulonia

- Location within Italy
- 38°26′44″N 16°34′44″E
- Periods: Archaic Greece to Roman Republic
- Location: Monasterace, Province of Reggio Calabria, Calabria, Italy.

History
- Built: Early second half of 7th century BC
- Built by: Settlers from Aegium or Croton
- Abandoned: Approximately 200 BC

Site notes
- Area: 35–45 ha (110 acres)

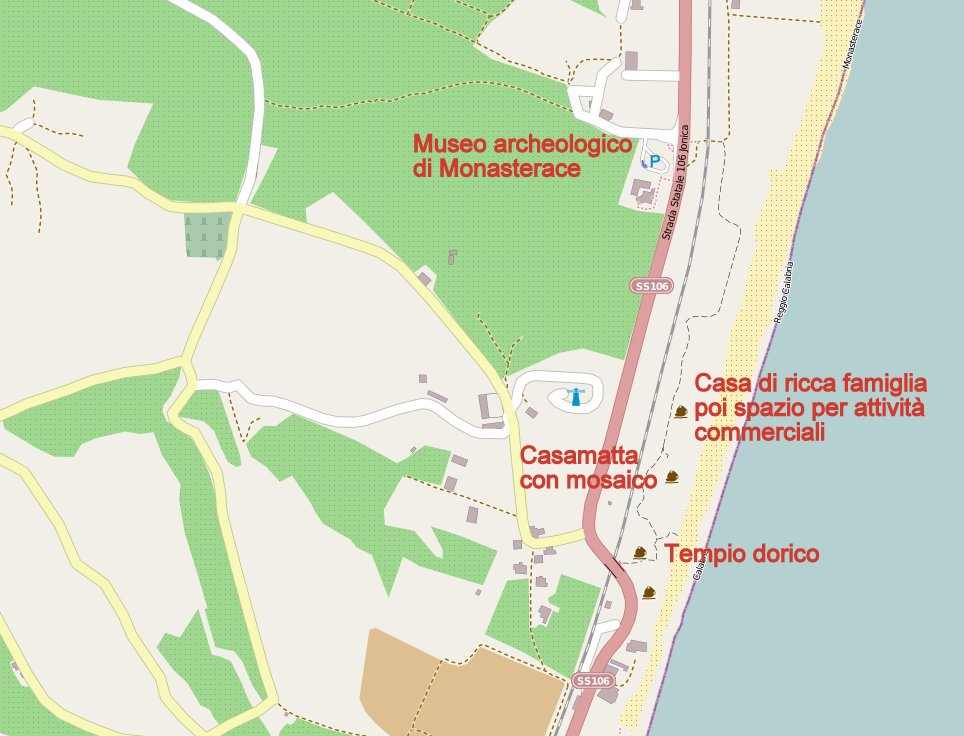
Map of the site

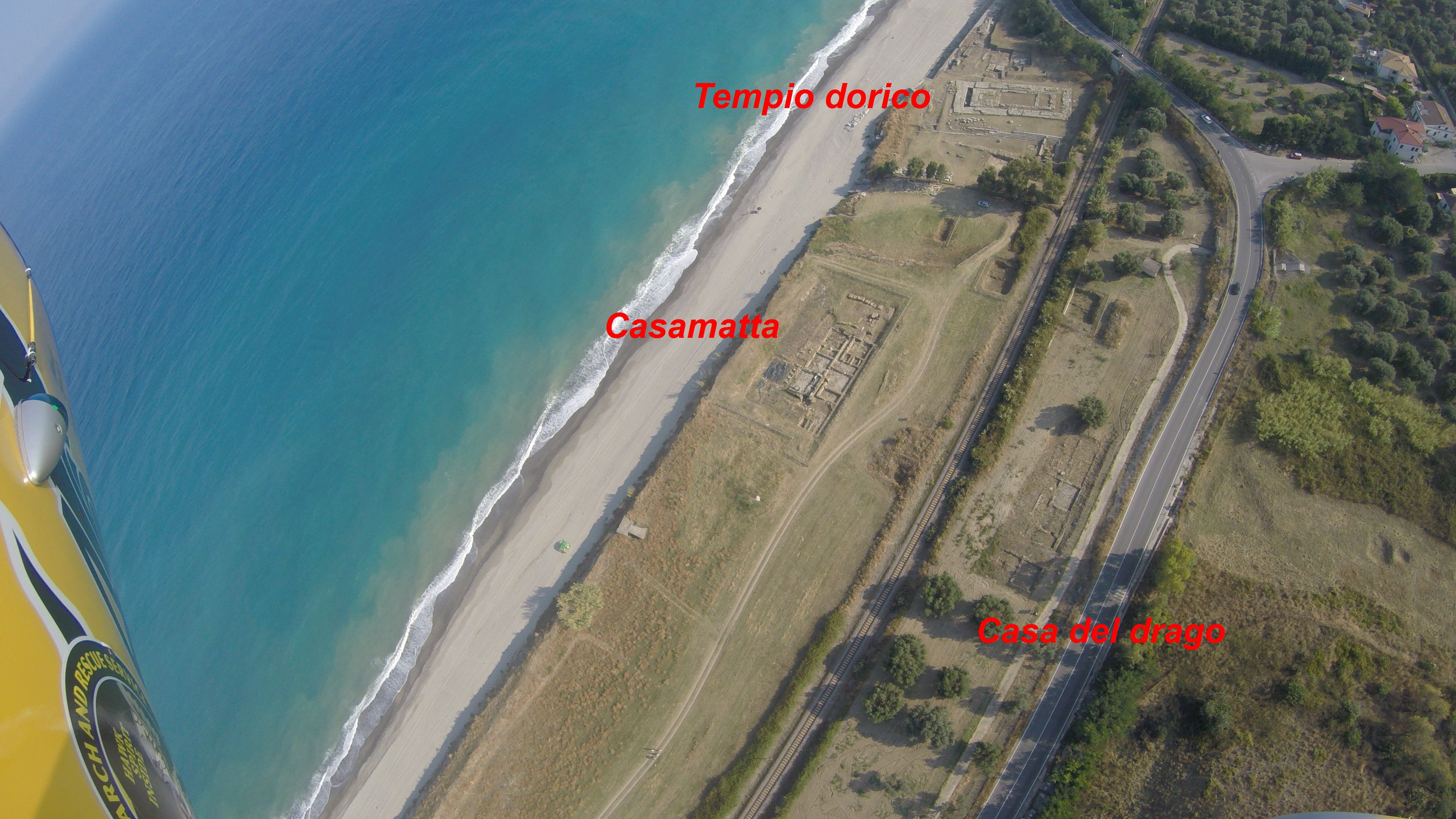
Kaulon from the top (2016)

Caulonia or Caulon (Ancient Greek: Καυλωνία, romanized: Kaulōnía; also spelled Kaulonia or Kaulon) was an ancient city on the shore of the Ionian Sea near Monasterace, Italy.

At some point after the destruction of the city by Rome in 200 BC, the inhabitants moved to a location further inland where they founded Stilida which developed into the modern town Stilo.

Since 1863 AD the name Caulonia has also been used by the town 15km away formerly known as Castelvetere. The city changed its name to Caulonia in honour of the ancient city, which was mistakenly believed to have been located in its territory.

Some of the artefacts which have been excavated at the site can now be seen in the Monasterace Archaeological Museum.

== Geography ==
The city was located between the mouth of the Stilaro river to the south and the mouth of the Assi river to the north. In ancient times the mouth of the Assi was located slightly further to the south. Punta Stilo, the "Cape of Columns", is a gentle arc-shaped headland located immediately north of the site. In ancient times the shoreline of Caulonia lay 300 meter further seawards. More than one hundred fluted columns which have been discovered on the seabed in front of Caulonia stood then on a broad arc-shaped headland. This headland probably did not have natural or artificial facilities which could provide protected anchorage for ships. The recession of the coastline started around 400 BC and ended in the 1st century AD. It was the result of a tectonic phase which caused landward rise and submergence of the seafloor. The shoreline stabilized in the period from the 1st century AD to the present. The walls of the city enclosed an area of approximately 35 to 45 hectares (110 acres).

== History ==
=== Foundation ===
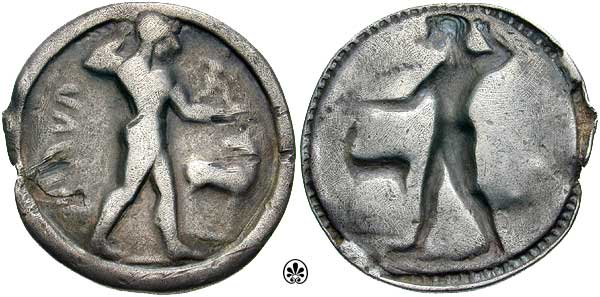
Nomos from Caulonia with Apollo holding a laurel branch and a stag, c. 525-500 BC

Archeological evidence shows that it was founded early in the second half of the seventh century BC. Both Strabo and Pausanias mention that the city was founded by Achaean Greek colonists. Pausanias also gives the name of the oecist, or founder, as Typhon of Aegium. Others sources such as Pseudo-Scymnus claim that it was founded by Croton. A. J. Graham does not consider these two options to be mutually exclusive because the oecist and settlers could have been invited by Croton.

=== 6th and 5th centuries BC ===
It had been thought that Caulonia was ruled by Kroton for some time but the fact that Caulonia minted its own coins in the 6th century BC suggests that it was independent. Also, the claim of Kroton over such a long stretch of coast close to its rival Locri would have been risky. According to Thucydides Caulonia supplied Athens with timber for ships during the Peloponnesian War (431–404 BC). The store of timber at Caulonia was attacked and burned by forces from Syracuse.

=== Conquest by Syracuse ===
In 389 BC the city was conquered by Dionysius I of Syracuse at the Battle of the Elleporus, who transplanted its citizens to Syracuse and gave them citizenship and an exemption from taxes for five years. He then levelled the city to the ground and gave its territory to his ally Locri.

It was refounded by Dionysius II of Syracuse several decades later and he probably gave control over the city to Locri.

=== Roman conquest and abandonment ===
The city was razed two more times: it was destroyed during the Pyrrhic War (280–275 BC) and taken by the Campanians, who formed the largest contingent of allies in the army of Rome. In 200 BC the town was completely destroyed by the Romans, when it sided with Hannibal during the Punic Wars. It was probably around this time that the ancient site of Caulonia, directly on the Ionian coast, was abandoned in favour of a more protected site inland. About 200 years later when the city is mentioned by Strabo, it is described by him as "situated before a valley" and deserted.

== Archaeology ==
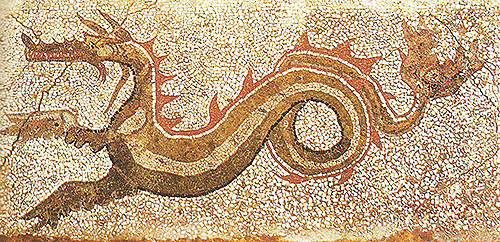
Mosaic of a dragon, third century BC, discovered in 1969

The first archaeological excavations were conducted between 1911 and 1913 by Paolo Orsi.

In 1969 a mosaic depicting a dragon was discovered in what is now called the "House of the Dragon". It was first exhibited in the Museo Nazionale della Magna Grecia, but was restored and transferred to the Monasterace Archeological Museum in 2012.

In the mid to late 1980', divers discovered numerous large fluted column sections and other Greek archaeological materials at water depths of up to 7 meters and as far as 300 meters offshore from Caulonia. Geoarchaeological analysis indicates that the seafloor on which these columns were discovered was part of a broad arcuate headland that sank after the Greek occupation.

In 2012 a mosaic floor of 25 m^{2} dating to late 4th century BC was discovered in what is thought to have been a thermal bathhouse. It is one of the largest mosaics from the Hellenistic period found in Southern Italy. The mosaic is divided into nine polychrome squares and another space with a polychrome rosette at the entrance of the room. It depicts a dragon in its centre, comparable to the mosaic discovered in 1969.

In 2013 a bronze tablet from the 5th century BC was discovered. The tablet has a dedication of eighteen lines written in the Achaean alphabet, the longest Achaean inscription ever discovered in Magna Graecia.

== Gallery ==
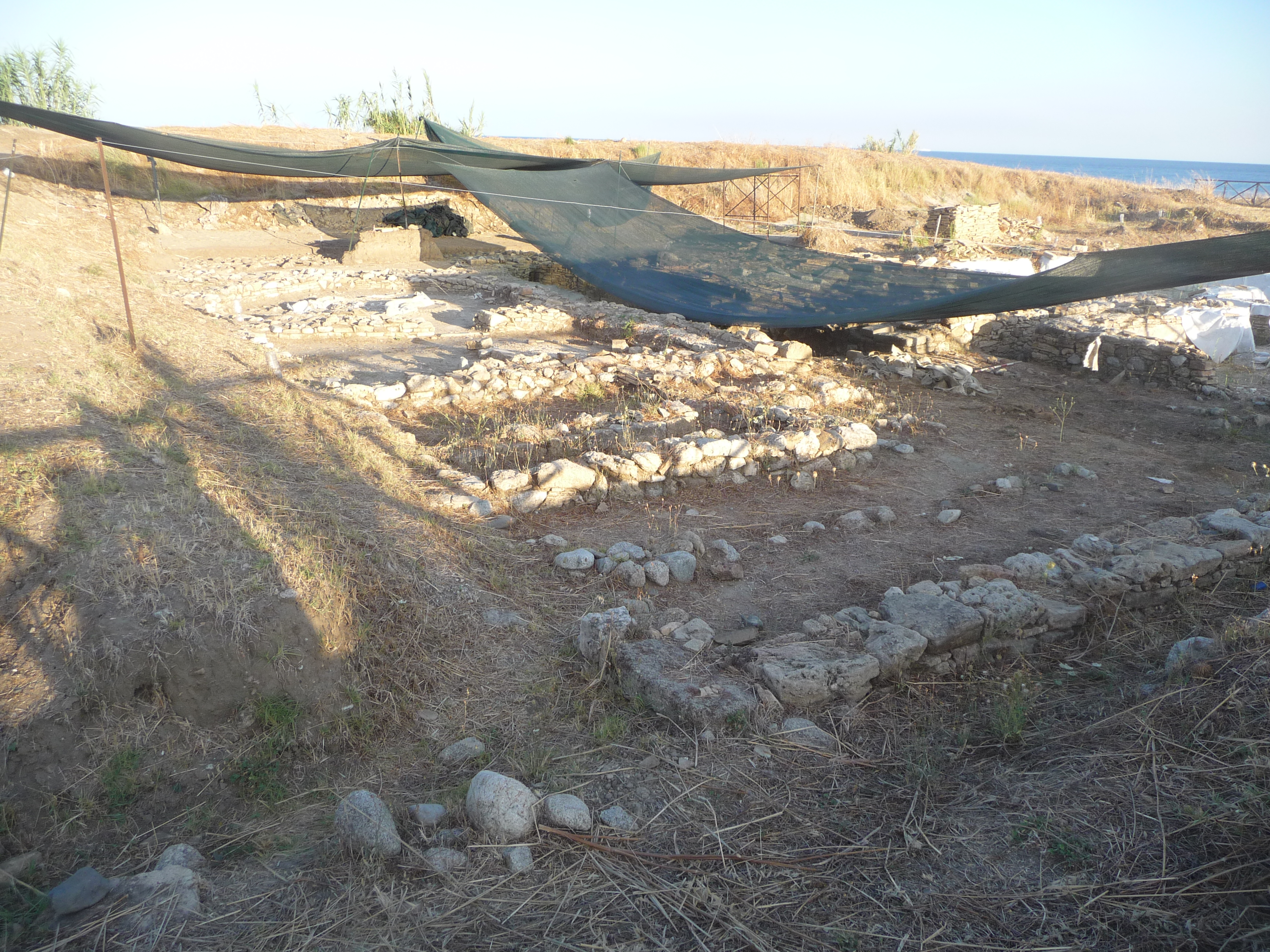
Ruins of a house

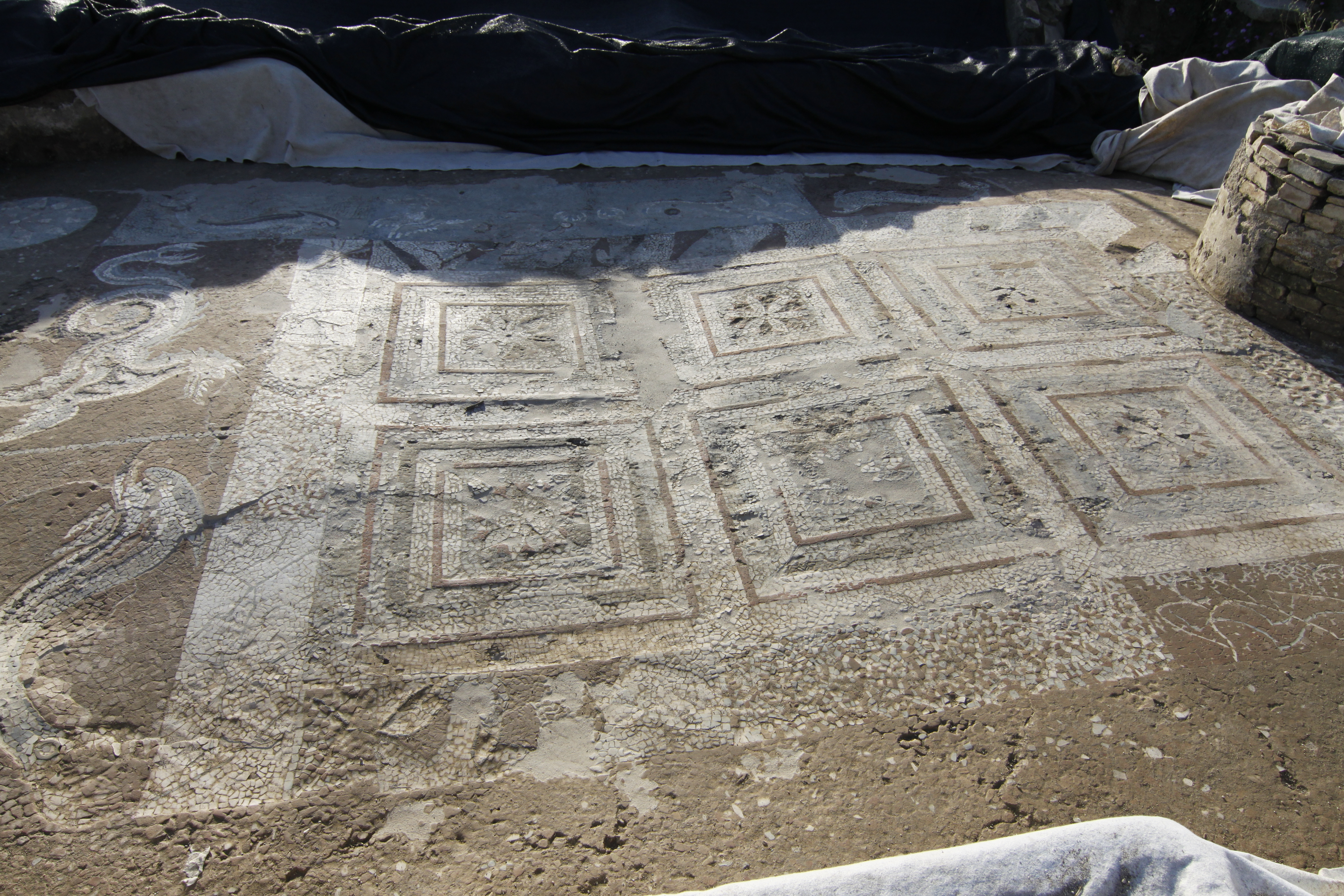
The large mosaic discovered in 2012

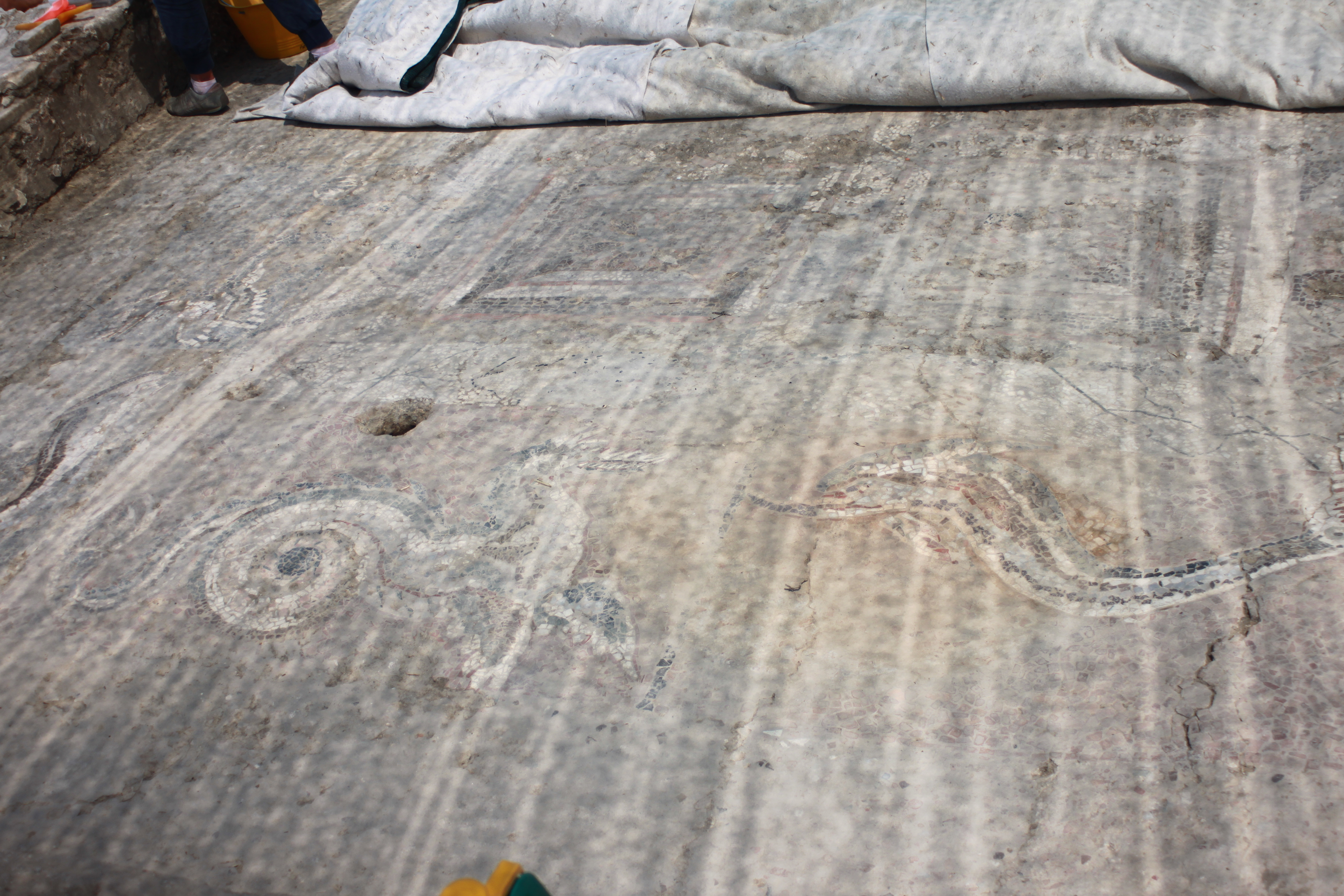
Detail of the large mosaic

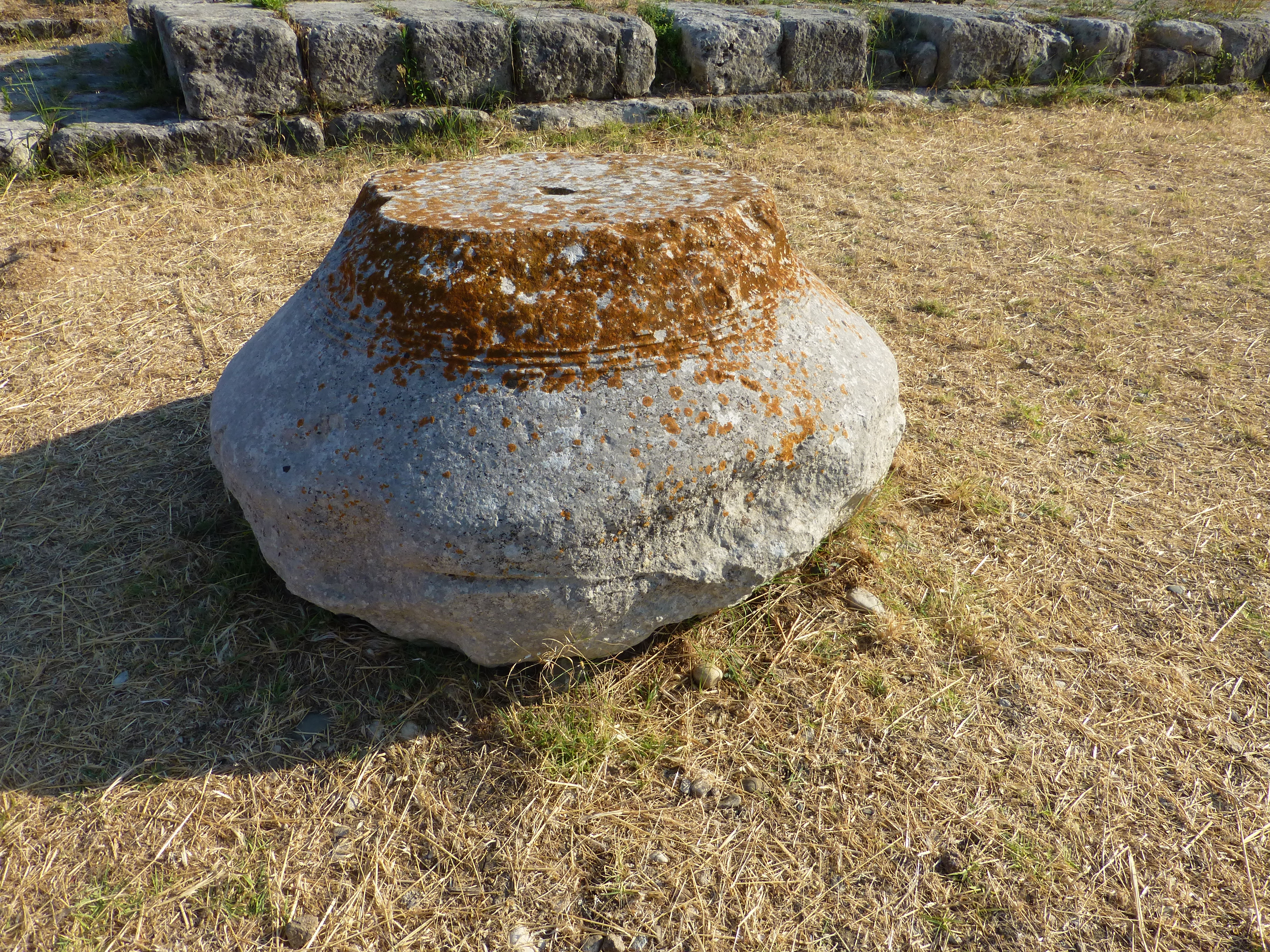
A doric capital (reversed)

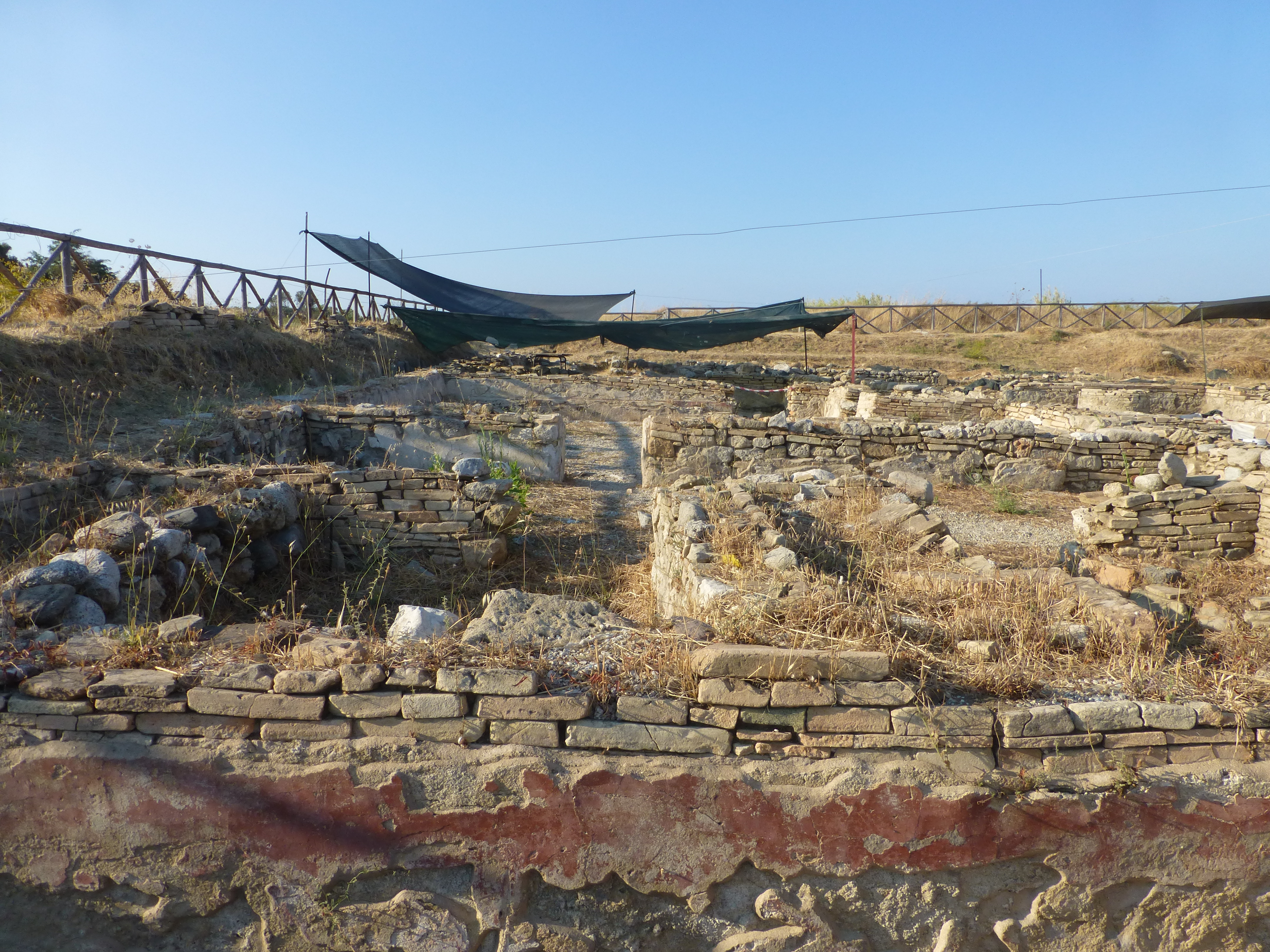
Several excavated structures

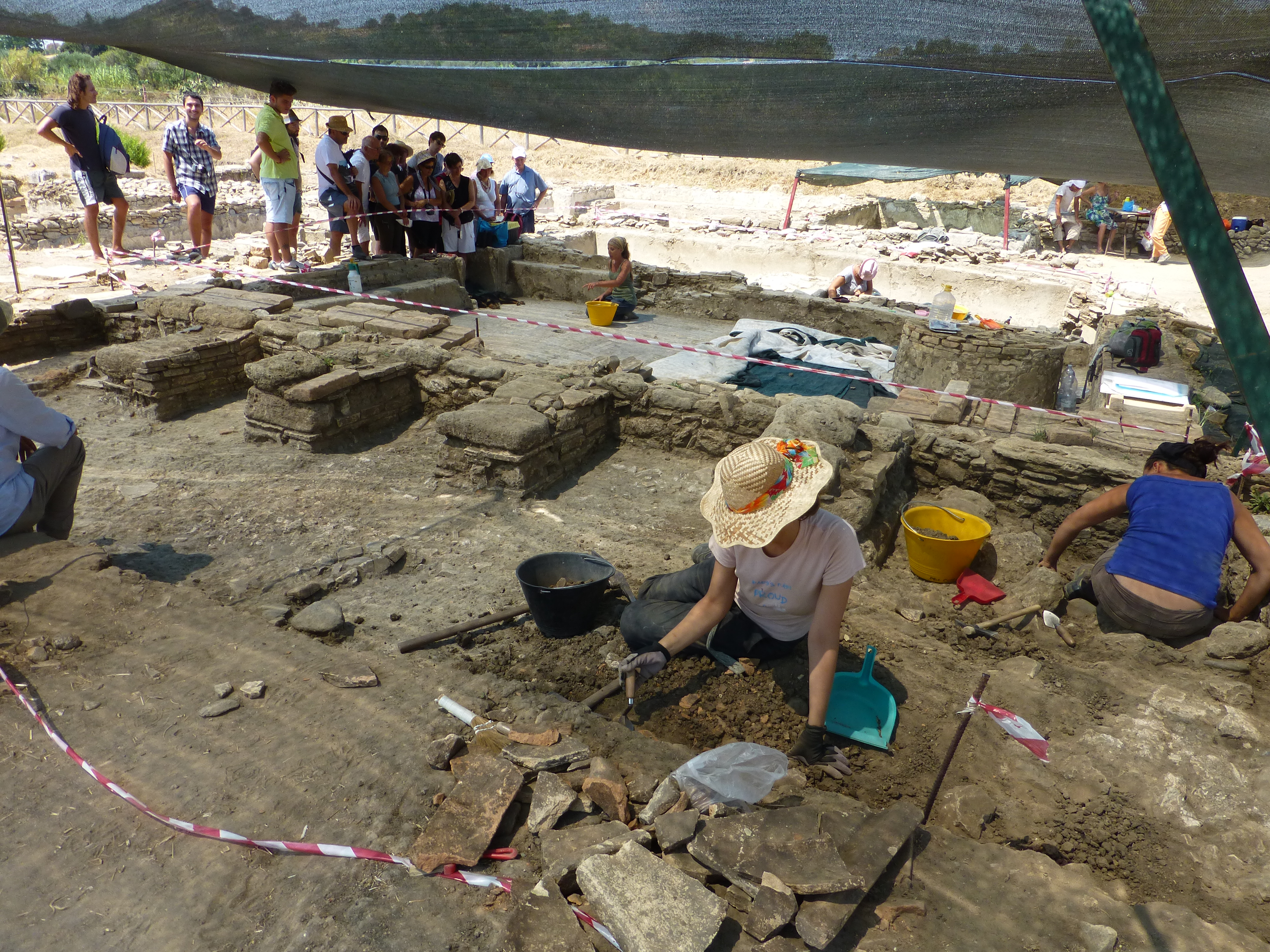
Excavations at Caulonia in August 2013

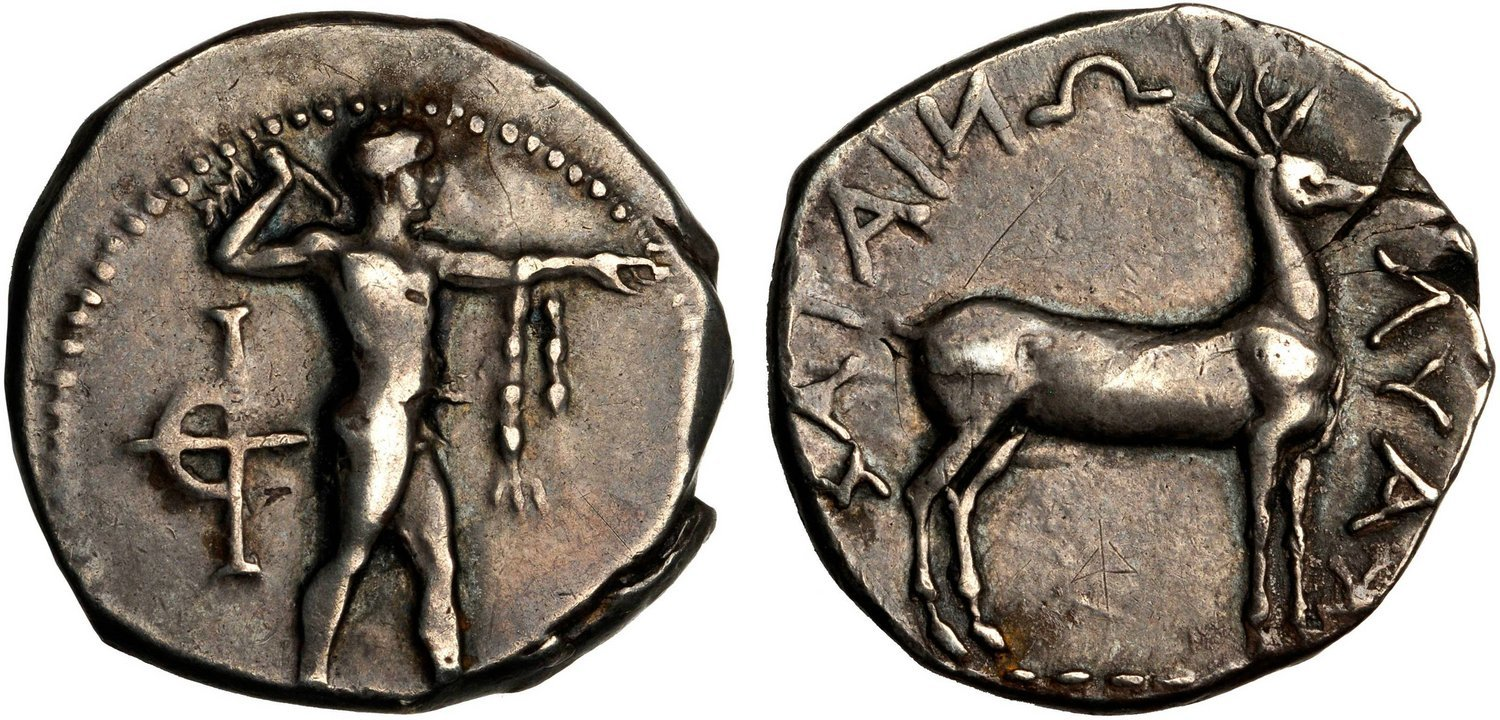
Silver stater of Caulonia, c. 400–388 BC

== Sources ==
=== Primary sources ===
- Diodorus Siculus (1952). Sherman, Charles L. (ed.). Library of History. Vol. 7. Cambridge, Massachusetts: Harvard University Press. ISBN 978-0-674-99428-7.
- ——— (1954). Oldfather, C. H. (ed.). Library of History. Vol. 6. Cambridge, Massachusetts: Harvard University Press. ISBN 978-0-674-99439-3.
- Pausanias (1918). Jones, W. H. S. (ed.). Description of Greece. Vol. 3. Cambridge, Massachusetts: Harvard University Press. ISBN 978-0-674-99300-6.
- Plutarch (1918). Perrin, Bernadotte (ed.). Lives. Vol. 6. Cambridge, Massachusetts: Harvard University Press. ISBN 978-0-674-99109-5.
- Strabo (1924). Jones, H. L. (ed.). Geography. Vol. 3. Cambridge, Massachusetts: Harvard University Press. ISBN 978-0-674-99201-6.
- Thucydides (1843). Thomas, Hobbes (ed.). History of the Peloponnesian War. London: Bohn.

=== Secondary sources ===
- Abenavoli, Paola (19 October 2012). "Scoperto a Monasterace il più grande mosaico ellenistico del sud Italia". Il Sole 24 Ore (in Italian).
- Bova, Damiano (2008). Bivongi nella valle dello Stilaro. Bari: Ecumenica Editrice. ISBN 978-88-8875-843-5.
- Caridi, Peppe (2013). "Straordinaria scoperta archeologica a Kaulonia (RC): ecco il testo più lungo in alfabeto acheo della Magna Grecia" (in Italian). Meteoweb.
- "Ritrovato a Kaulonia, in Calabria, il testo più lungo in alfabeto acheo della Magna Grecia" (in Italian). Fame di Sud. 8 October 2013.
- Fronda, Michael P. (2010). Between Rome and Carthage: Southern Italy During the Second Punic War. Cambridge, United Kingdom: Cambridge University Press. ISBN 978-1-139-48862-4.
- Graham, A. J. (1982). "The western Greeks". In Boardman, John; N. G. L., Hammond (eds.). The expansion of the Greek world, eight to sixth centuries B.C. The Cambridge Ancient History. Vol. 3. Cambridge, United Kingdom: Cambridge University Press. ISBN 978-0-521-23447-4.
- Hansen, Mogens Herman (2004). "The Concept of the Consumption City Applied to the Greek Polis". In Nielsen, Thomas Heine (ed.). Once Again: Studies in the Ancient Greek Polis. Historia Einzelschriften. Vol. 180. Stuttgart: Franz Steiner Verlag. ISBN 978-3-515-08438-3.
- Muggia, Anna Pavia (2006). Cancik, Hubert; Schneider, Helmuth (eds.). "Caulonia". Brill's New Pauly. Brill Online.
- Stanley, Jean-Daniel (2007). "Kaulonia, southern Italy: Calabrian Arc tectonics inducing Holocene coastline shifts". Méditerranée (108): 7–15. doi:10.4000/mediterranee.152.
