= Punta Stilo Lighthouse =

Punta Stilo
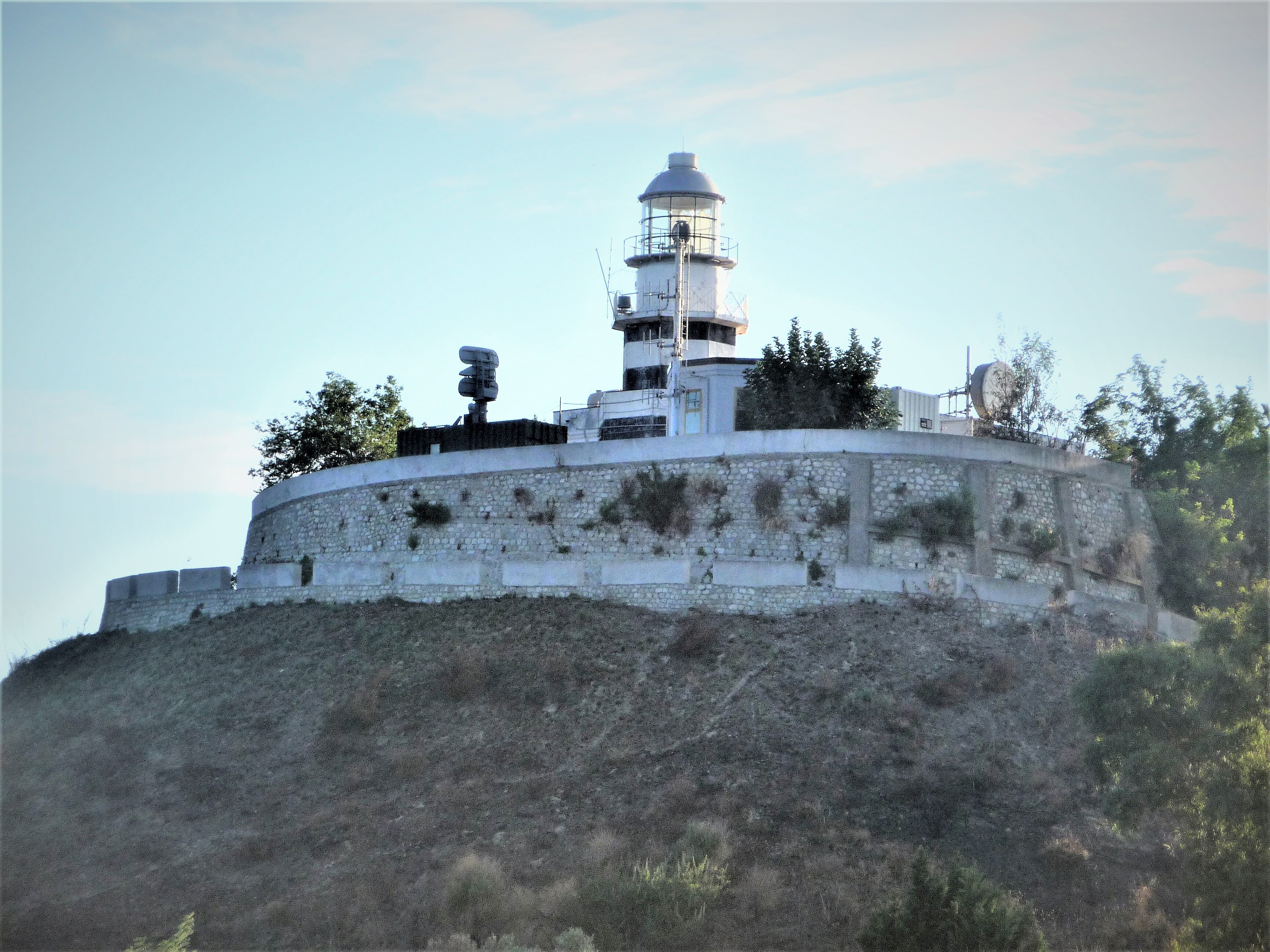
- Punta Stilo Lighthouse
- Location: Punta Stilo; Monasterace; Calabria; Italy
- Coordinates: 38°26′51″N 16°34′39″E

Tower
- Constructed: 1887
- Construction: masonry tower
- Automated: yes
- Height: 15 metres (49 ft)
- Shape: octagonal prism tower with double balcony and lantern attached to 1-storey keeper's house
- Markings: black and white horizontal bands, grey lantern dome
- Power source: mains electricity
- Operator: Marina Militare

Light
- Focal height: 54 metres (177 ft)
- Lens: type OR 250
- Intensity: AL 1000 W
- Range: main: 22 nautical miles (41 km; 25 mi) reserve: 11 nautical miles (20 km; 13 mi)
- Characteristic: Fl (3) W 15s.
- Italy no.: 3388 E.F.

Punta Stilo Lighthouse (Italian: Faro di Punta Stilo) is an active lighthouse on the Ionian Sea along the coast of Calabria in the municipality of Monasterace, Italy.

== Description ==
The work to build the tower started in 1891 and the light was lit the first time in May 1895. The tower, attached to 1-storey keeper's house, has an octagonal prism shape and it is built in masonry. It is white painted with black horizontal bands, has a height of 15 metres (49 ft) and is placed at 54 metres (177 ft) above sea level. The lighthouse emits three white flashes in a 15 seconds period visible up to 22 nautical miles (41 km; 25 mi). The light is operated by the Lighthouses Service of Marina Militare identified by the code number 3388 E.F.

== See also ==
- List of lighthouses in Italy
