= Tectonic phase =

In structural geology and petrology, a tectonic phase or deformation phase is an episode of rock deformation caused by tectonic forces. Geologists recognize these phases by observing changes in the direction of forces acting within the Earth and by identifying patterns formed in the rocks, such as folds, faults, or mineral grain alignments. These phases can be extensional or compressional in nature.

When a sequence of tectonic phases occurs within the same geodynamic setting, they together record the development of an orogeny, or mountain-building event. In many Phanerozoic orogenies, multiple deformation phases can be distinguished through structural evidence, and these phases may be accompanied by metamorphism.

== Tectonic phases in basin geology and sedimentary rocks ==
According to Steno's principle of original horizontality, sedimentary rocks are normally deposited as horizontal layers. When tectonic movement occurs sedimentary layers can be tilted. Under such circumstances, the sedimentary planes will have a dip (an angle with a horizontal reference plane). When new sedimentary layers are deposited on top of tilted ones, they will have an angle with the older ones, a structure which is called an angular unconformity. Any angular unconformity is proof that a tectonic phase took place between the deposition of the layers below and on top of it.

It is important to know if the tectonic phase was a longer event or if it was local or regional. Tectonic phases can be important events that affected large areas. The Alleghenian orogeny in North America (during the Carboniferous period) for example can be found as an angular unconformity between rock layers in large parts of that continent.

When a tectonic phase occurred while sedimentation of new sediments continued, every new layer will have a slightly different dip from the one below. The result is a sequence of sediments that wedges out in one direction. This is usually the case on the margins of geologic basins.

== Tectonic phases in metamorphic rocks ==
In petrology, metamorphic phases can be distinguished by analysis of minerals and microstructures (petrography) in metamorphic rocks. By analysing the sequence in which the minerals and structures were formed, more than one phase can be found in most metamorphic rocks (this is called polymetamorphism). Radiometric dating can determine the absolute ages of different mineral growth phases, providing information on the pressure–temperature conditions the rock experienced. These ages reflect the timing of mineral crystallization, and while they may not directly correspond to tectonic events, they offer a record of when a tectonic phase ended.

== See also ==
- Structural geology
- Tectonics
