= Battle of the Elleporus =

Battle between Syracuse and the Italiote League (389 BC)

Date	389 BC
Location	Stilaro river, Calabria
Result	Syracusan Victory

Belligerents
Syracuse	Italiote League

Commanders and leaders
Dionysius I of Syracuse	Heloris †

Strength
20,000–23,000	25,000 and 2,000 cavalry

Casualties and losses
Unknown	7,000–10,000 surrendered

The Battle of the Elleporus was fought in 389 BC between the forces of Dionysius I of Syracuse and the armies of the Italiote League. Dionysius triumphed in the battle and was then able to extend his control into southern Italy.

== History ==
After arriving in southern Italy with a force of 20,000 men, 3000 horses and a fleet of 40 galleys, Dionysius decided to lay siege to Caulonia. To force Dionysius into relaxing his siege, the League commander Heloris decided to leave his camp and march north towards Elleporus with his army which numbered 25,000 infantry and 2,000 cavalrymen (mostly composed of Syracusan exiles). In response, Dionysius lifted the siege and marched his army to Elleporus 7 km (4.3 mi) away from the enemy.

The two armies were ignorant of each other's whereabouts until Dionysius acquired intelligence about Heloris's position from one of his scouts. Exploiting this advantage he ordered his forces to launch a surprise attack on the enemy at dawn. Dionysius used his overwhelming numerical superiority to form a tight noose around the enemy. The disorganised and scattered forces of Heloris became easy prey for Dionysius's well organised phalanx and fled after hearing that their leader had been killed. They sought refuge on a hill but were surrounded by Dionysius's forces and later 10,000 of them surrendered.

Dionysius I of Syracuse went on to conquer southern Italy (Magna Graecia), heavily defeating the Italiote (Greek) League.
