= Monasterace =

Monasterace Monaseraci (Sicilian) Monaseraci (Greek)
- Comune
- Comune di Monasterace
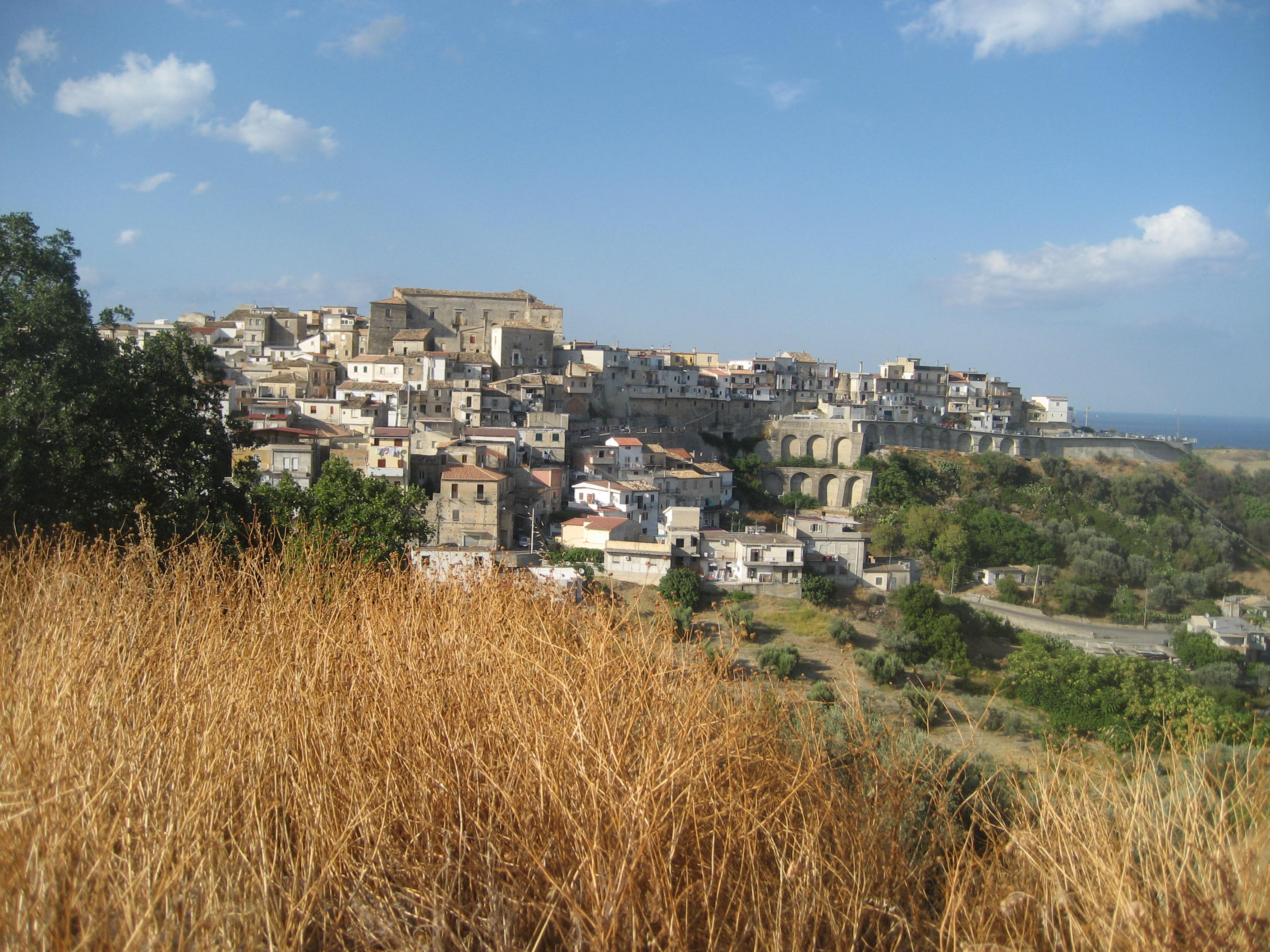
- View of Monasterace Superiore.

- Coat of arms

- Location within Italy Location within Calabria
- Coordinates: 38°27′13″N 16°33′11″E
- Country: Italy
- Region: Calabria
- Metropolitan city: Reggio Calabria (RC)

Government
  - Mayor: Maria Carmela Lanzetta

Area
  - Total: 15.7 km^{2} (6.1 sq mi)

Population (December 2007)
  - Total: 3,536
  - Density: 225/km^{2} (583/sq mi)
- Demonym: Monasteracesi
- Time zone: UTC+1 (CET)
  - Summer (DST): UTC+2 (CEST)
- Postal code: 89040
- Dialing code: 0964

Monasterace (Calabrian Greek: Monaseraci; Greek: Μοναστηράκιον, romanized: Monastērákion, lit. 'little monastery') is a comune (municipality) in the Province of Reggio Calabria in the Italian region Calabria, located about 50 kilometres (31 mi) south of Catanzaro and about 90 kilometres (56 mi) northeast of Reggio Calabria. The ruins of the ancient Greek city Caulonia are located a short distance north of the frazione Monasterace Marina, on the coast. Also north of Monasterace Marina is the Monasterace Archeological Museum, where finds from Caulonia are exhibited.

== See also ==
- Monasterace Archeological Museum
- Monasterace-Stilo railway station
- Vallata dello Stilaro
- Punta Stilo Lighthouse
