= History of Calabria =

The history of Calabria has one of the oldest records of human presence in Italy, beginning around 700,000 BCE when a type of Homo erectus left traces around coastal areas. During the Paleolithic period Stone Age humans created the "Bos Primigenius", a figure of a bull on a cliff created around 10,000 BCE in the Romito Cave in the town of Papasidero. When the Neolithic period came the first villages were founded, around 3,500 BCE. Calabria was at one time the center of the European silk industry.

== Antiquity ==
[...] as after the death of Oenotrius, Oenotria had another name, and was called Italy, and Morgetia, and after this name it was called Sicily, Chonia, Iapigia, and Salentia, and afterwards cogionta in a name it was called Magna Graecia.

— Girolamo Marafioti, Croniche, et antichita di Calabria

According to the Greeks, the region was inhabited before colonization by several communities, including the Ausones-Oenotrians (vine-growers), the Italians, Morgetes, Sicels, and Chone. It is said that the mythical ruler Italus called Calabria “Italy”. Italus was ostensibly present in the first half of the 15th century BCE. Antiochus of Syracuse, the first historian of the West, depicted him as “A good and wise king, capable of subduing neighboring peoples making use of persuasion and force from time to time”.

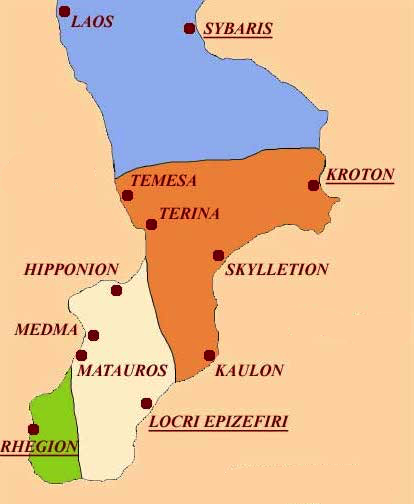
Greek city-states (underlined) of Calabria, 6th century BCE

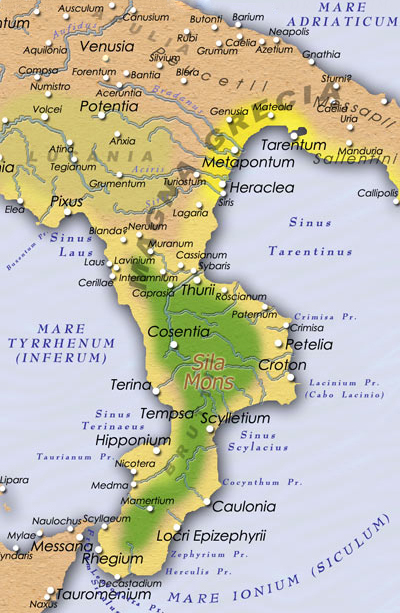
Magna Grecia c. 280 BC

Around 1500 BCE a tribe called the Oenotri ("vine-cultivators"), settled in the region. Ancient sources state they were Greeks who were led to the region by their king, Oenotrus. However it is more likely they were an ancient Italic people who spoke an Italic language. During the eighth and seventh centuries BCE, Greeks founded many settlements on the coast of southern Italy. In Calabria they founded Chone (Pallagorio), Cosentia (Cosenza), Clampetia (Amantea), Scyllaeum (Scilla), Sybaris (Sibari), Hipponion (Vibo Valentia), Epizephyrian Locris (Locri), Kaulon (Monasterace), Krimisa (Cirò Marina), Kroton (Crotone), Laüs (comune of Santa Maria del Cedro), Medma (Rosarno), Metauros (Gioia Tauro), Petelia (Strongoli), Rhégion (Reggio Calabria), Scylletium (Borgia), Temesa (Campora San Giovanni), Terina (Nocera Terinese), Pandosia (Acri) and Thurii, (Thurio, comune of Corigliano Calabro).

In the year 744 BCE a group of Chalcidian settlers founded Rhegion (today Reggio Calabria) at the southern end of the peninsula. Soon after, other Chalcidans founded Zancle (current Messina) on the other side of the strait, securing their dominion over that arm of the sea. Later Chalcidian settlers from Rhegion and Zancle founded Metauros (Gioia Tauro) and divided the river of the same name (today Petrace) from the Italic city of the Tauri.

In 710 BCE Ionian colonists founded Sybaris on the fertile plain of the same name at the mouth of the Crati. From this colony later originated the founding of Paestum (in Lucania), Lao (at the mouth of the river of the same name) and Scidros (between Cetraro and Belvedere Marittimo). Ionian colonies were Clampetia (in the area between Amantea and San Lucido), Temesa (between Amantea and Nocera Terinese), Terina (in the plain of Sant'Eufemia), Krimisa (Cirò Marina), Petelia (Strongoli).

In 743 BCE Achaean settlers instead founded Kroton (current Crotone), on the point now known as Capo Colonna. Crotonians and Sybarites later became rivals. Crotonians founded the colonies of Caulonia (near today's Monasterace Marina) and Scillezio (Squillace). Around 700 BCE Crotonian colonists founded Bristacia, current Umbriatico.

Around 680 BCE colonists from the Greek Locris founded Epizephyrian Locris, near present-day Locri. Locrians founded Hipponion (Vibo Valentia) and Medma (Rosarno).

The Bruttians, similar to the neighboring Lucanians, declared themselves independent of their “cousins” from beyond the Pollino around the 4th century BCE, forming a confederate state. The capital of the federates was Consentia, present-day Cosenza. It was one of the main cities along with Pandosia, a city whose traces have been lost; some historical references locate it among the municipalities of Castrolibero, Marano Principato, and Marano Marchesato, while other recent archaeological discoveries locate the city near the present city of Acri, Aufugum (Montalto Uffugo), Argentanum (San Marco Argentano), Bergae, Besidiae (Bisignano), and Lymphaeum (Luzzi).

Between 560 and 550 BCE a decade-long war was fought between Kroton and Epizephyrian Locris. The war was resolved by the battle on the Sagra River, which saw the alliance between the people of Reggio and Locri emerge victorious.

In 510 BCE the Crotonians attacked Sybaris, and fought the Sybarites by the River Trionto, in a clash pitting 100,000 Crotonians against 300,000 Sybarites. The Dorians won the battle and occupied Sybaris, sacking it over 70 days and diverting the Crati River onto the ruins of the city.

In 444 BCE Athenian and Peloponnesian colonists founded Turi on the site of the destroyed Sybaris at the behest of Pericles in the détente plan related to the Thirty Years' Peace in the Peloponnesian War.

In 338 BCE, Locri asked Dionysius of Syracuse for help against the expansion of Reggio (no longer their allieds) and Croton. The Syracusans intervened by defeating the Crotonians on the narrowest point of the river Sagra, current Allaro, and occupying Croton for ten years, an event that ended the Crotonians' power; a similar fate befell Reggio, which resisted the numerous attacks of Dionysius of Syracuse, but in 386 BCE after eleven months of siege, was taken by the Syracusans, also weakened in its political power.

Rhegion was the birthplace of one of the famed nine lyric poets, Ibycus and Metauros was the birthplace of another, Stesichorus, who was amongst the western world's first lyric poets. Kroton spawned many victors during the ancient Olympics and other Panhellenic Games. Among the most famous were Milon of Croton, who won six wrestling events in six consecutive Olympics, along with seven events in the Pythian Games, nine events in the Nemean Games and ten events in the Isthmian Games and also Astylos of Croton, who won six running events in three consecutive Olympics. Through Alcmaeon of Croton (a philosopher and medical theorist) and Pythagoras (a mathematician and philosopher), who moved to Kroton in 530 BCE, the city became a center of philosophy, science and medicine. The Greeks of Sybaris created "Intellectual Property". The Sybarites founded at least 20 other cities, including Poseidonia (Paestum in Latin, on the Tyrrhenian coast of Lucania), Laüs (on the border with Lucania) and Scidrus (on the Lucanian coast in the Gulf of Taranto). Locri was renowned as the town where Zaleucus created the first Western Greek law, the "Locrian Code" and the birthplace of ancient epigrammist and poet Nossis.

The Greek cities of Calabria came under pressure from the Lucanians who conquered the north of Calabria and pushed further south, taking over part of the interior, probably after they defeated the Thurians near Laus in 390 BCE. Decades later the Bruttii took advantage of the weakened Greek cites caused by wars between them and took over Hipponium, Terina and Thurii. The Bruttii helped the Lucanians fight Alexander of Epirus (334–32 BCE), who had come to the aid of Tarentum (in Apulia), which was also pressured by the Lucanians. After this, Agathocles of Syracuse ravaged the coast of Calabria with his fleet, took Hipponium and forced the Bruttii into unfavourable peace terms. However, they soon seized Hipponium again. After Agathloces' death in 289 BCE the Lucanians and Bruttii pushed into the territory of Thurii and ravaged it. The city sent envoys to Rome to ask for help in 285 and 282 BCE. On the second occasion, the Romans sent forces to garrison the city. This was part of the episode that sparked the Pyrrhic war.

The name Italy entered common usage, defining the inhabitants of the city-states of the Mezzogiorno first as Italiotes, then Italics with the arrival of the Romans, who would later include Cisalpine Gaul.

== Romanization ==
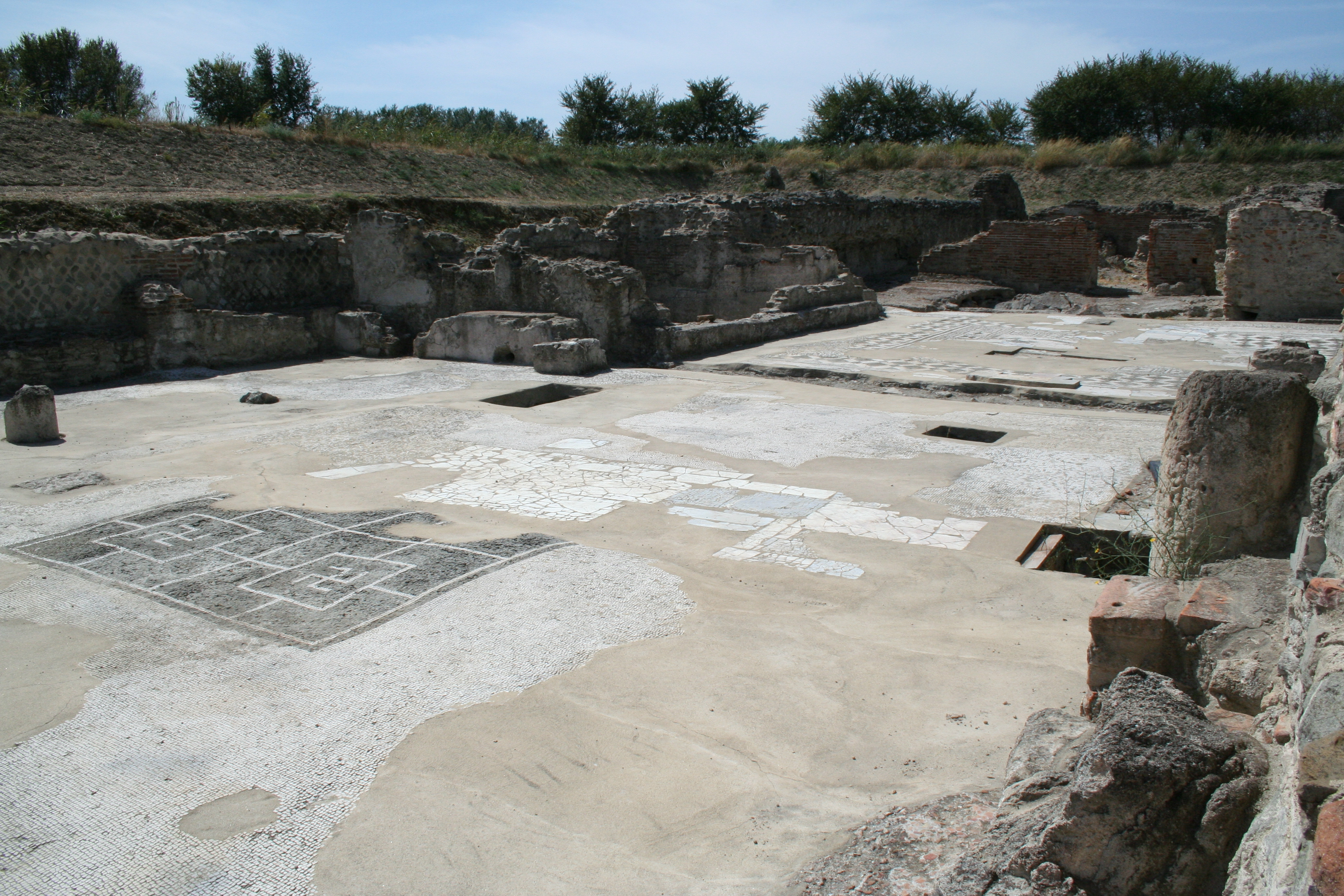
Excavated mosaic floor with swastikas, Sybaris

At the beginning of the 3rd century BCE the cities of southern Italy, which had been allies of the Samnites, were still independent, but inevitably came into conflict as a result of Rome's expansion as their expansion in central and northern Italy was not sufficient to provide arable lands they needed.

=== Pyrrhic War ===
Between 280 and 275 BCE the Tarentine War was fought between Rome and Taranto. The latter sought help from Pyrrhus, king of Epirus, who in 280, together with his allies, the Bruttians and Lucanians, defeated the Romans at the Battle of Heraclea, thanks to the use of elephants. But Pyrrhus was later defeated by the Romans at Maluentum (current Benevento) in 275 and retreated to Sicily, where Syracuse needed help against the Carthaginians. Transiting through Calabria, Pyrrhus' army is said to have sacked the shrine of Persephone in Locri, triggering the wrath of the gods. This, combined with the fact that Rome had formed alliances with some of the last poleis of Magna Graecia, including Reggio, caused Pyrrhus to return home.

After Pyrrhus was eventually defeated, to avoid Roman revenge the Bruttii submitted willingly and gave up half of the Sila, a mountainous plateau valuable for pitch and timber. Rome subjugated southern Italy by means of treaties with the cities.

=== Punic Wars ===
Between 264 and 251 BCE the First Punic War was fought in Sicily, between Rome and Carthage, which ended with the creation of the Roman province of Sicily. Following the Carthaginian provocation with the siege of Saguntum, Spain, the Second Punic War broke out in 217 BCE. The Carthaginian general Hannibal, after taking Saguntum and Marseille, crossed the Alps and defeated the Romans at the Trebbia River, the Ticino River, Lake Trasimeno, and in 216 BCE at Cannae, in Apulia.

After the victory at Cannae, Hannibal achieved his first important political-strategic result. He made a brief raid on the Roman Ager before retiring to Capua. Hannibal sent his brother Mago with part of his forces into Bruttium to accommodate the surrender of cities that abandoned the Romans and to force out the rest. The people of Petelia, who remained loyal to the Romans, were attacked by the occupying Carthaginians and by the Bruttians who had allied with Hannibal. After an 11-month siege. Because the Romans were unable to help them, with Roman consent, they surrendered.

Hannibal led his army to Cosenza, which, after a less harsh defense, fell to the Carthaginians. An army of Bruttians besieged and occupied another Greek city, Croton, except for the fortress, which was inhabited by less than 2,000 people. The Locrians passed to the Bruttians and the Carthaginians. Only the Regginians preserved their loyalty to Rome and their independence.

Hannibal had a history of the Punic Wars produced, and ordered it to be kept in the temple of Juno Lacinia in Crotone so that the Romans could not falsify the history of the war. Plutarch drew from that source. In the summer of 204 BCE the Romans arrived in Calabria and enslaved the Bruttians to punish their rebellion. Vast estates were requisitioned and assigned to members of the Roman aristocracy.

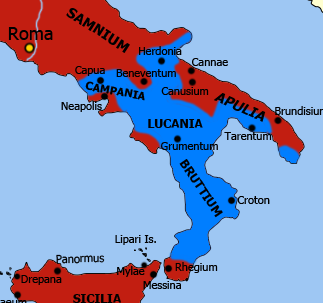
Allies of Hannibal (blue) in Second Punic War

During the Second Punic War (218–201 BCE) the Bruttii allied with Hannibal, who sent Hanno, one of his commanders, to Calabria. Hanno twice marched toward Capua (in Campania) with Bruttian soldiers to take them to Hannibal's headquarters there, but he was twice defeated. When his campaign in Italy came to an end, Hannibal took refuge in Calabria, whose steep mountains provided protection against the Roman legions. He set up his headquarters in Kroton and stayed there for four years until he was recalled to Carthage. The Romans fought a battle with him near Kroton, but its details are not recorded. Many Calabrian cities surrendered to the Romans and Calabria was put under a military commander.

== Roman era ==
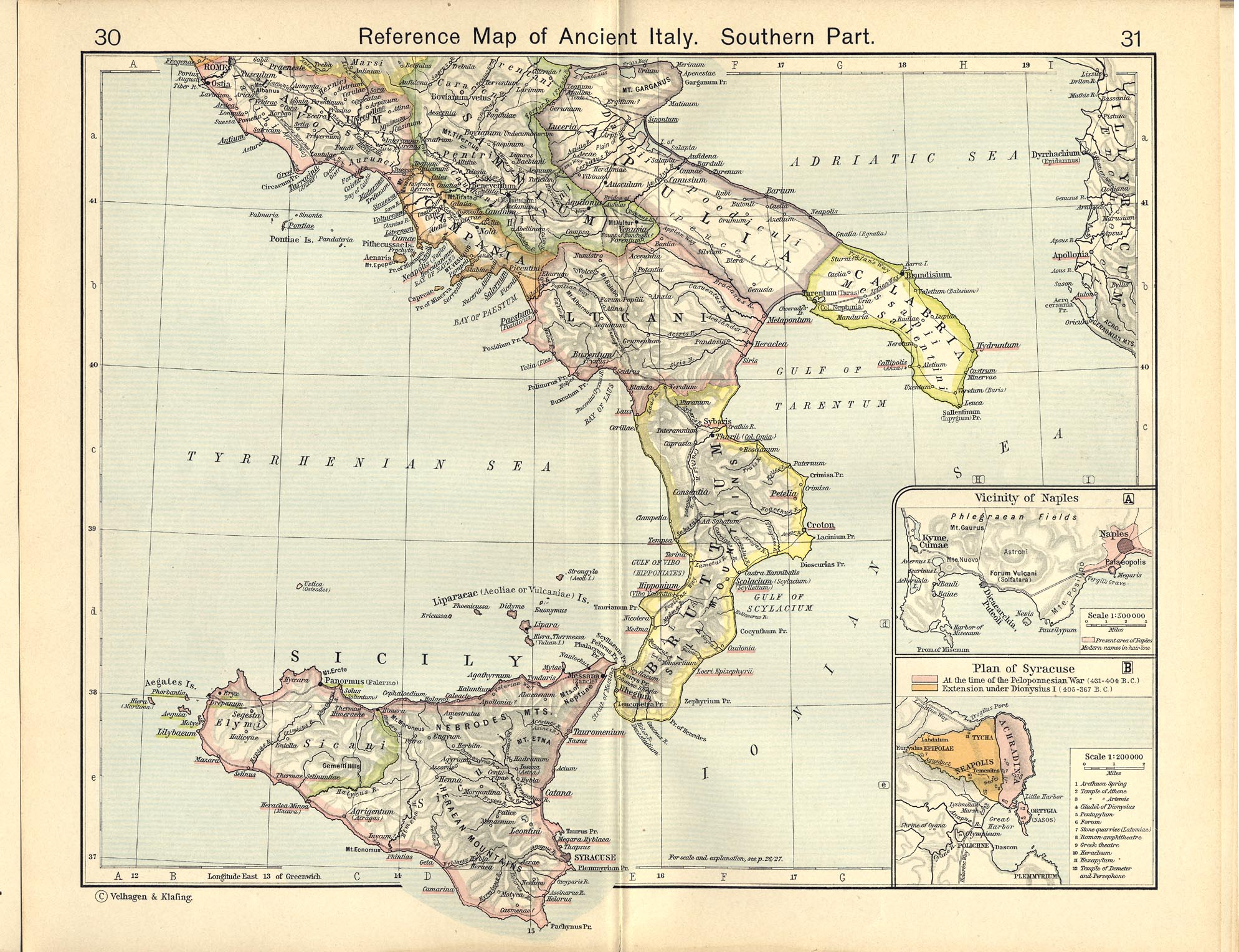
Calabria in Roman times

Nearly a decade after the war, the Romans set up colonies at Tempsa and Kroton (Croto in Latin) in 194 BCE, Copiae in the territory of Thurii (Thurium in Latin) in 193 BCE, and Vibo Valentia in the territory of Hipponion in 192 BCE.

Starting in the third century BCE, the name Calabria was given to the Adriatic coast of the Salento peninsula in modern Apulia. In the first century BCE this name extended to the entirety of the Salento, when the Roman emperor Augustus divided Italy into regions and modern Calabria was known as Regio III Lucania et Bruttii.

From 186 BCE, repression of the Bacchanalia, and of the Greek cult of Bacchus, is triggered throughout Magna Graecia as part of a plan to Romanize southern Italy.

Between 136 and 132 BCE, the First Servile War was fought in Sicily. The Syrian slave Eunus gathered some 200,000 serfs, proclaiming himself king, and for four years held out against the Roman legions from Enna and Taormina. Eventually Rome crushed the repression and crucified 20,000 slaves throughout the island. The Servile war was an expression of the slave class' discontent, on whom the entire Roman economy rested.

In 132 BCE the consul Popilius Lenate ordered the construction of the Via Capua-Rhegium, also known as Via Popilia, which, tracing the route now occupied by A2 Highway and State Road 18 Tirrena, reached Reggio. In this period the main towns were Cosenza, Crotone, Temesa, Turi, Vibo Valentia Taurianum, and Reggio.

Between 91 and 89 BCE the Social War was fought, at the end of which the Roman Senate granted the Italics Roman citizenship.

Between 73 and 71 BCE the Third Servile War was fought, during which the Thracian gladiator Spartacus gathered around him tens of thousands of desperate slaves, including many Bruttians, and set out northward from Capua, defeating many Roman legions. But the intervention of Marcus Licinius Crassus in a battle on the Sele River in Campania crushed any claim of Spartacus and his men. 6,000 slaves were crucified along the Appian Way.

Magna Graecia is commemorated by Marcus Tullius Cicero in a 44 BCE letter written from Calabria. He was traveling to Greece in the confusing situation after Caesar's assassination on the Ides of March.

=== Imperial era ===
Map of Regio III Lucania and Bruttius with names of main cities

In rearranging Italy's political geography, Octavian Augustus merged Calabria and Basilicata into Regio III Lucania et Bruttii, with the capital and seat of the corrector in Reggio, the region's largest city.

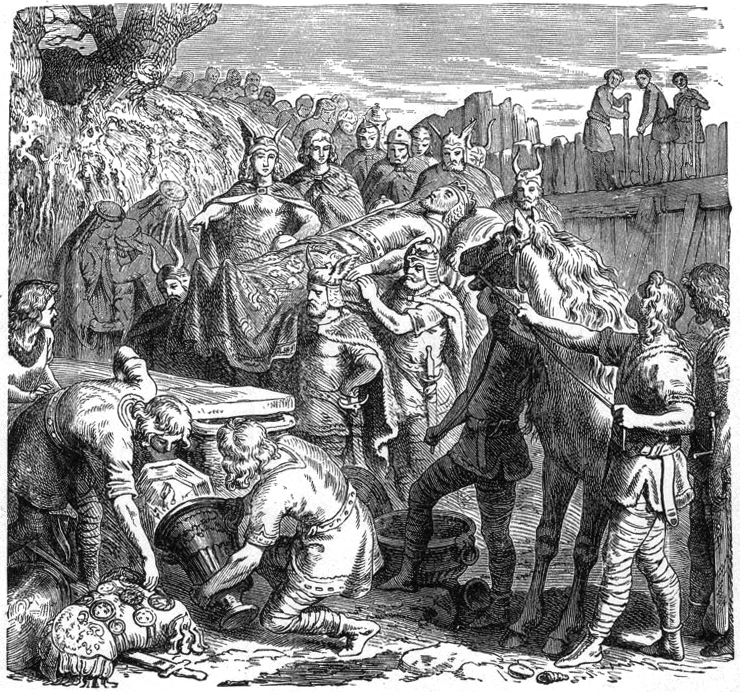
Death of Alaric I, buried in the bed of the Busento river in Cosenza

Augustus exiled his daughter Julia, guilty of "excessive sentimental vivacity", to Reggio.

In 61 Paul the Apostle passed through Reggio on his way to Rome. Christianity spread in Calabria to the port centers and along the Via Popilia, vital areas of the Roman region.

Emperor Trajan opened the Via Traiana during his rule, roughly traced by State Road 18 Tirrena halfway up the coast.

In 305 Calabrian patrician Bulla rebelled against the Roman Empire with 600 horsemen and 5,000 infantry. He was defeated by the imperial militia, but Rome never fully controlled the forests of Sila.

On October 1, 313 Constantine I promulgated the Edict of Milan in favor of Christianity, which began to spread. In 391 Emperor Theodosius I proclaimed Christianity the state religion. In 363 Basil the Great landed in Caesarea. His disciples founded various monasteries and cenobia beginning in the ninth century, laying the foundations of the Calabrian-Greek monastic tradition.

In 365 an earthquake accompanied by a tidal wave shook the southern Mediterranean, affecting Calabria's coastal towns.

The Roman Empire split into two branches. The Western branch, ruled by Honorius with its capital in Ravenna, suffered in 410 the invasion of Alaric's Visigoths, who sacked Rome and marched south. Legend has it that Alaric died in Cosenza, buried at the confluence of the Crati and Busento under the two rivers.

== Middle Ages ==
With the fall of the western Roman Empire in 476, Italy was taken over by the Germanic chieftain Odoacer and later became part of the Ostrogothic Kingdom in 489. The Ostrogothic kings ruled officially as Magistri Militum of the Byzantine Emperors. All government and administrative positions were held by Romans, while all primary laws were legislated by the Byzantine Emperor. During the sixth century, under the Ostrogoths' rule, Romans remained the center of government and cultural life. The Roman Cassiodorus, like Boethius and Symmachus, emerged as one of the most prominent men of his time. He was an administrator, politician, scholar and historian who was born in Scylletium (near Catanzaro). He spent most of his career trying to bridge the divides of East and West, Greek and Latin cultures, Romans and Goths, and official Christianity and Arian Christianity, which was the form of Christianity adopted by the Ostrogoths and which had earlier been banned. He established the Vivarium (monastery) in Scylletium. He oversaw the collation of three editions of the Bible in Latin. Seeing the value of collecting all the books of the Bible in one volume, he was the first to produce Latin Bibles in single volumes. The most well-known was the Codex Grandior which became the ancestor of all modern western Bibles.

Cassiodorus was the heart of the administration of the Ostrogothic kingdom. Theodoric made him quaestor sacri palatii (quaestor of the sacred palace, the senior legal authority) in 507, governor of Lucania and Bruttium, consul in 514 and magister officiorum (master of offices, one of the most senior administrative officials) in 523. He was praetorian prefect (chief minister) under the successors of Theodoric: under Athalaric (Theodoric's grandson, reigned 526–34) in 533 and, between 535 and 537, under Theodahad (Theodoric's nephew, reigned 534–36) and Witiges (Theodoric's grandson-in-law, reigned, 536–40). The major works of Cassiodorus, besides the Bibles, were the Historia Gothorum, a history of the Goths, the Variae and account of his administrative career and the Institutiones divinarum et saecularium litterarum, an introduction to the study of the sacred scriptures and the liberal arts which was influential in the Middle Ages.

Byzantine (Eastern Roman) Emperor Justinian I, retook Italy from the Ostrogoths between 535 and 556. He soon lost much of Italy to the Lombards between 568 and 590, but retained the south until 1059–1071, where they thrived and where the Greek language was the official and vernacular language. In Calabria towns such as Stilo and Rossano and San Demetrio Corone achieved great religious status. From the 7th century many monasteries were built in the Amendolea and Stilaro Valleys. Stilo was the destination of hermits and Basilian monks. Many Byzantine churches survive in the region. The 10th-century church in Rossano, together with the "twin" church of Sant'Adriano in San Demetrio Corone (foundation 955, rebuilt by the Normans on the still visible foundation of the previous Byzantine church), are considered among the country's best preserved Byzantine churches. They were built by St. Nilus the Younger as a retreat for the monks who lived in the tufa grottos underneath. The present name of Calabria comes from the duchy of Calabria.

Around 800, Saracens began invading Calabria, attempting to wrest control from the Byzantines. This group of Arabs had been successful in Sicily. The people of Calabria retreated into the mountains. Although the Arabs never got a strong hold on the whole of Calabria, they did control some villages while enhancing trade relations with the eastern world. In 918, Saracens captured Reggio (which they renamed Rivà), holding many of its inhabitants to ransom or enslaving them. During this time many staples of later Calabrian cuisine came into fashion: citrus fruits and eggplants for example. Exotic spices such as cloves and nutmeg were introduced.

Under Byzantine rule, between the end of the 9th and the beginning of the 10th century, Calabria was one of Italy's first regions to introduce silk production. Mulberry trees for the production of raw silk were introduced to southern Italy by the Byzantines at the end of the ninth century. Around 1050 Calabria had 24,000 mulberry trees cultivated for their foliage.

At the beginning of the 10th century (c. 903), Catanzaro was occupied by the Saracens, who founded an emirate and took the Arab name of قطنصار – Qaṭanṣār. An Arab presence is evidenced by findings at an eighth-century necropolis which had items with Arabic inscriptions. Around the 1050, Catanzaro rebelled against Saracen dominance and briefly returned to Byzantine control.

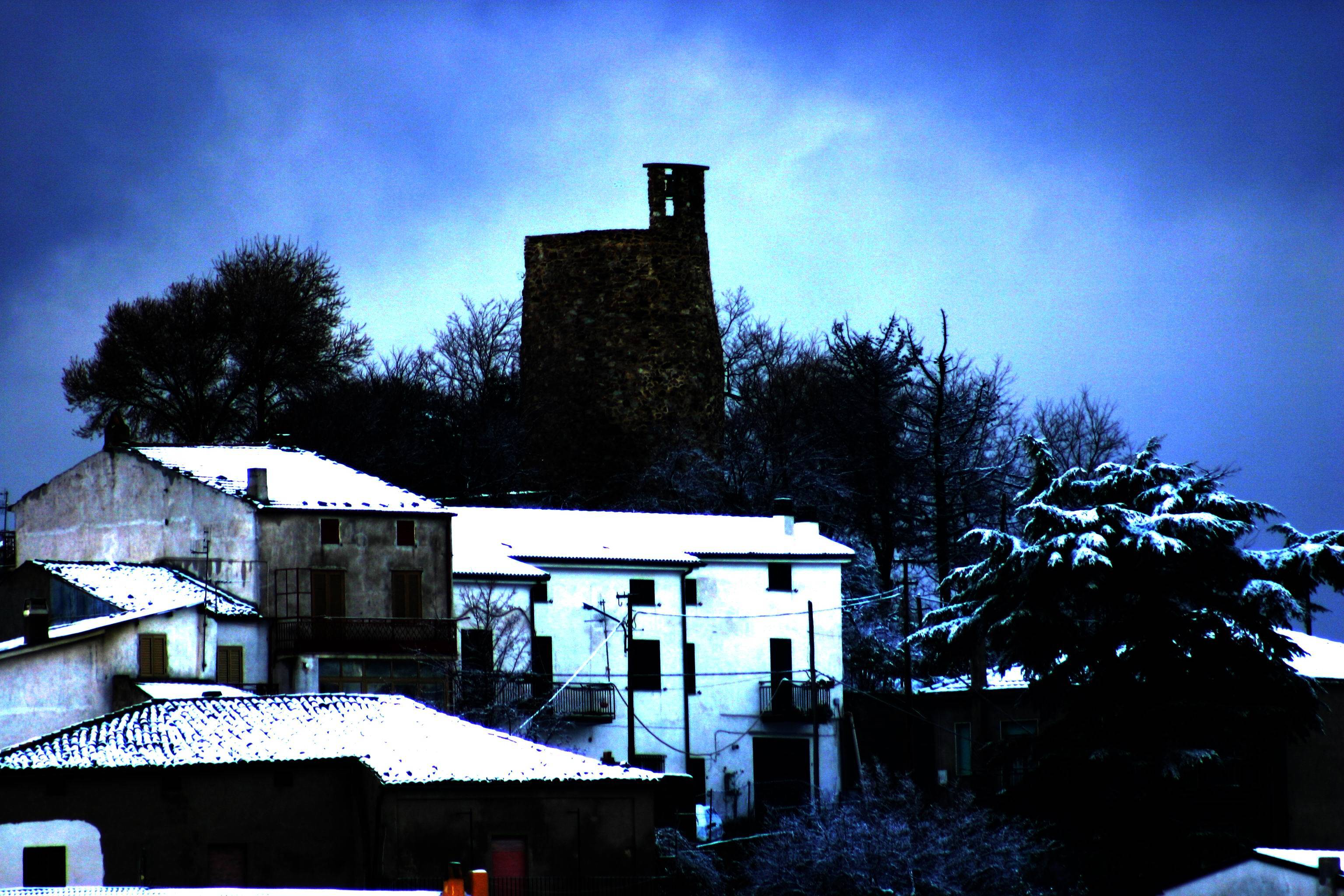
Norman tower at Acri

In the 1060s the Normans, under the leadership of Robert Guiscard's brother, Roger I of Sicily, established a presence, and organized a government modeled on the Eastern Roman Empire that was run by the local magnates of Calabria. Of note is that the Normans established their presence there, in Calabria, 6 years prior to their conquest of England. The purpose of this presence in Calabria was to lay the foundations for the Crusades 30 years later, and for the creation of the Kingdom of Jerusalem, and the Kingdom of Sicily. Ships sailed from Calabria to the Holy Land. This made Calabria one of Europe's richest regions as princes from England, France and other regions constructed secondary residences and palaces there, on their way to the Holy Land. Guiscard's son Bohemond, who was born in San Marco Argentano, was one of the leaders of the first crusade. The Via Francigena was an ancient pilgrim route that goes from Canterbury to Rome and southern Italy, reaching Calabria, Basilicata and Apulia, where the crusaders lived, prayed and trained, respectively.

In 1098, Roger I of Sicily was named the equivalent of an apostolic legate by Pope Urban II. His son Roger II later became the first King of Sicily and formed what became the Kingdom of Sicily, which lasted nearly 700 years. Under the Normans southern Italy was united as one region and started a feudal system of land ownership in which the Normans were made lords while peasants performed all the work.

In 1147, Roger II attacked Corinth and Thebes, two important centers of Byzantine silk production, capturing the weavers and their equipment and establishing his own silkworks in Calabria, thereby allowing the Norman silk industry to flourish.

In 1194, Frederick II took control of the region, after inheriting the Kingdom from his mother Constance, Queen of Sicily. He created a kingdom that blended cultures, philosophy and customs and built several castles, while fortifying existing ones that the Normans had previously constructed. After the death of Frederick II in 1250, Calabria was controlled by the Capetian House of Anjou, under Charles d’Anjou after he was granted the crown of the Sicilian Kingdom by Pope Clement IV. In 1282, under Charles d’Anjou, Calabria became a domain of the newly created Kingdom of Naples, and no longer of the Kingdom of Sicily, after he lost Sicily due to the rebellion of the Sicilian Vespers. During the 14th century, Barlaam of Seminara who became Petrarch's Greek teacher and his disciple Leonzio Pilato, who translated Homer's works for Giovanni Boccaccio.

While the cultivation of mulberry was beginning in northern Italy, silk made in Calabria peaked at 50% of European production. As the cultivation of mulberry was difficult in Northern and Continental Europe, merchants and operators used to purchase raw materials in Calabria. The Genoese silk artisans used fine Calabrian silk for the production of velvets. In particular, the silk of Catanzaro supplied almost all of Europe and was sold to Spanish, Venetian, Genoese, Florentine and Dutch merchants. Catanzaro became the European lace capital via a large silkworm breeding facility that produced all the laces and linens used in the Vatican. The city was known for its fabrication of silks, velvets, damasks and brocades.

=== Waldensian emigration ===
The settlement in Calabria of Waldensian peoples from the valleys bordering the Western Alps - predominantly the Germanasca, Chisone and Pellice valleys - might have taken place in the Swabian period, in the 13th century, although it spread mainly from the first half of the 14th century.

Historian Pierre Gilles, author in 1644 of A History of the Reformed Churches, recounts how in 1315 some landowners in Calabria offered the Waldensians land to cultivate, in exchange for an annual fee. They were given power to establish communities there free of feudal obligations. This favored the founding, or repopulation, of numerous urban centers, such as San Sisto and La Guardia (now called Guardia Piemontese because of its Waldensian origins), inhabited mainly by Waldensians. They created a linguistic "island" in central Calabria, where the most common dialect is Occitan, a dialect typical of the Aosta Valley and northern Piedmont. The Waldensian community remained until the second half of the 16th century, when, during the European wars of religion between Catholics and Protestants, they adhered to the Lutheran faith, suffering persecution by the Spanish viceroyal authorities.

== Early modern period ==
In the 15th century, Catanzaro was exporting its silk cloth and its technical skills to neighbouring Sicily. By the middle of the century, silk spinning had achieved scale in Catanzaro. Catanzaro's silk industry supplied almost all of Europe and was sold at large fairs to Spanish, Venetian, Genoan, Florentine, and Dutch merchants. The city was famous for its manufacture of silks, velvets, damasks and brocades. In 1519, Emperor Charles V formally recognized the growth of Catanzaro's silk industry, allowing the city to establish a consulate of silk crafts, charged with regulating and controlling the various stages of a production that flourished throughout the 16th century.

In 1442, the Aragonese took control under Alfonso V of Aragon who became ruler under the Crown of Aragon. In 1501 Calabria came under the control of Ferdinand II of Aragon, whose wife Queen Isabella of Castille is famed for sponsoring the first voyage of Christopher Columbus in 1492. Calabria suffered under Aragonese rule with heavy taxes, feuding landlords, starvation, and sickness. After a brief period in the early 1700s under the Habsburgs, Calabria came under the control of the Spanish Bourbons in 1735. During the 16th century Calabrian doctor and astronomer Luigi Lilio created the Gregorian calendar.

In 1466, King Louis XI decided to develop a national silk industry in Lyon and employed many Italian workers, mainly from Calabria. The fame of the master weavers of Catanzaro spread throughout France. They were invited to Lyon to teach the techniques of weaving. In 1470, one of these weavers, known in France as Jean Le Calabrais, invented the prototype of a Jacquard-type loom. It was able to work the yarns faster and more precisely.

Charles V of Spain formally recognized the growth of the silk industry of Catanzaro in 1519 by allowing the city to establish a consulate of the silk craft, charged with regulating and checking the various stages of production. At the time, the city declared that it had over 500 looms. By 1660, when the town had about 16,000 inhabitants, its silk industry ran 1,000 looms, and employed at least 5,000 people. The silk textiles of Catanzaro were sold at the kingdom's markets and were exported to Venice, France, Spain and England.

Entire communities of Albanians migrated to towns in northern Calabria, called by the king of Naples in recognition of the services that Albanian leader Gjergj Kastrioti Skanderbeg had rendered to the crown against the Angevins. After 1478 the sovereign allowed these refugees fleeing the Turkish advance in Albania after Skanderbeg's demise to occupy abandoned villages to repopulate them, granting them royal privileges and franchises: hence the Arbëreshë community was born.

In the 16th century, Calabria was characterized by demographic and economic development, driven by increasing demand for silk products.

After the relative pacification, Calabria followed the historical and political events of the Kingdom of Naples, enduring struggles between France and Spain, for territorial control of the Italian peninsula. For example, on 28 June 1495, the Battle of Seminara, north of Reggio Calabria, took place, where French troops that had occupied the Kingdom of Naples beat the Hispano-Napolitan army under the command of Gonzalo Fernández de Córdoba and Ferdinand II of Naples. However, the latter managed to drive the French out the following year. In 1502, Córdoba conquered Reggio, placing it under Ferdinand II.

Calabria remained under Spanish rule for two centuries and was administratively divided into Calabria Ulteriore and Calabria Citeriore, initially governed by a single governor. From 1582, governance was divided between two officials. The administrative capital of Calabria Citeriore was Cosenza, which during the 16th century experienced an artistic and humanistic flowering, so much so that it was called the “Athens of Calabria”. In fact, the city became one of the most important cities of the realm. After Naples, it became the second city to have a school of cartography. In 1511 the Accademia Cosentina was born, founded by Aulo Giano Parrasio, followed by the philosopher Bernardino Telesio, defined by Francis Bacon as the first of the "new men". ICalabria Ulteriore had administrative headquarters in Reggio Calabria, capital from 1582 to 1594, then losing it due to Turkish raids that sacked it several times. For this reason, from 1594 the administrative offices were transferred to Catanzaro, remaining more than 220 years. In 1563 philosopher and natural scientist Bernardino Telesio wrote On the Nature of Things according to their Own Principles and pioneered early modern empiricism. He influenced the works of Francis Bacon, René Descartes, Giordano Bruno, Tommaso Campanella and Thomas Hobbes. In 1602 Campanella wrote his most famous work, The City of the Sun and later defended Galileo Galilei during his first trial with his work A Defense of Galileo, which was published in 1622. In 1613 philosopher and economist Antonio Serra wrote A Short Treatise on the Wealth and Poverty of Nations and was a pioneer in the Mercantilist tradition.

Calabria was important to the Spanish monarchs beginning in the reign of Emperor Charles V of Habsburg, who held the title of King of Naples, as when the sovereign granted royal privileges to Catanzaro. The city had resisted the 28 August 1528 siege by a French army supported by some FrancophileCalabrian and Apulian nobles. In gratitude, Charles V granted the city the right to use the imperial eagle as its symbol, exempted it from royal tributes and gave it the power to mint coins worth one carlin. The emperor personally visited the region in 1535 on his return from the capture of Tunis, where, at the command of a fleet of as many as 500 ships, he had defeated the Ottoman army and freed 20,000 Christian slaves. After the African conquest, Charles V landed in Sicily and then in Calabria. Having passed Aspromonte, he visited Nicastro, Martirano, Carpanzano, (Note: An inscription from 1605, under the portico of the Shrine of the Virgin of Grace in Carpanzano, still commemorates its passage: Carolus V Imperator Maximo Capta Tuneti Brutiam Repetes Carpanzano ... anno 1535.) Rogliano, (Note: Another inscription of Charles V's passage is also found in the Ricciulli Palace in Rogliano.) Tessano and Cosenza. From there the monarch passed through Bisignano, Castrovillari and Laino, and continued to Naples. During Spanish rule in Calabria, many towns tried to defend themselves from Saracen raids. For example, Gioja (current Gioia Tauro), was fortified with city walls reinforced by watchtowers to defend against incursions. Several Calabrian cities such as Palmi (where the Saracen Tower stands) and Reggio Calabria were fortified with towers.

Despite the heavy taxation and the growth of baronial power, the population remained loyal to the sovereign, seen as a defender of the poor people against the abuses of the powerful. In 1647–1648, exasperated by the excessive tax burden, people in Catanzaro stormed the offices of the tax collectors (arrendatori). The governor intervened and had the leaders of the revolt hanged, causing the rest to flee.

== Eighteenth century ==
During the 17th century, silk production in Calabria begin to suffer from competition by rising competitors elsewhere on the Italian Peninsula, France, and increasing imports from the Ottoman Empire and Persia.

Following the War of the Spanish Succession, the Kingdom of Naples passed in 1707 to Austria, whose Emperor Charles VI of Habsburg added King of Naples to his titles: the Habsburgs, ruling for a short period, sought to modernize the kingdom's political structures.

In 1732 Pope Clement XII founded the Italo-Albanian College and Library, transferred from San Benedetto Ullano to San Demetrio Corone in 1794.

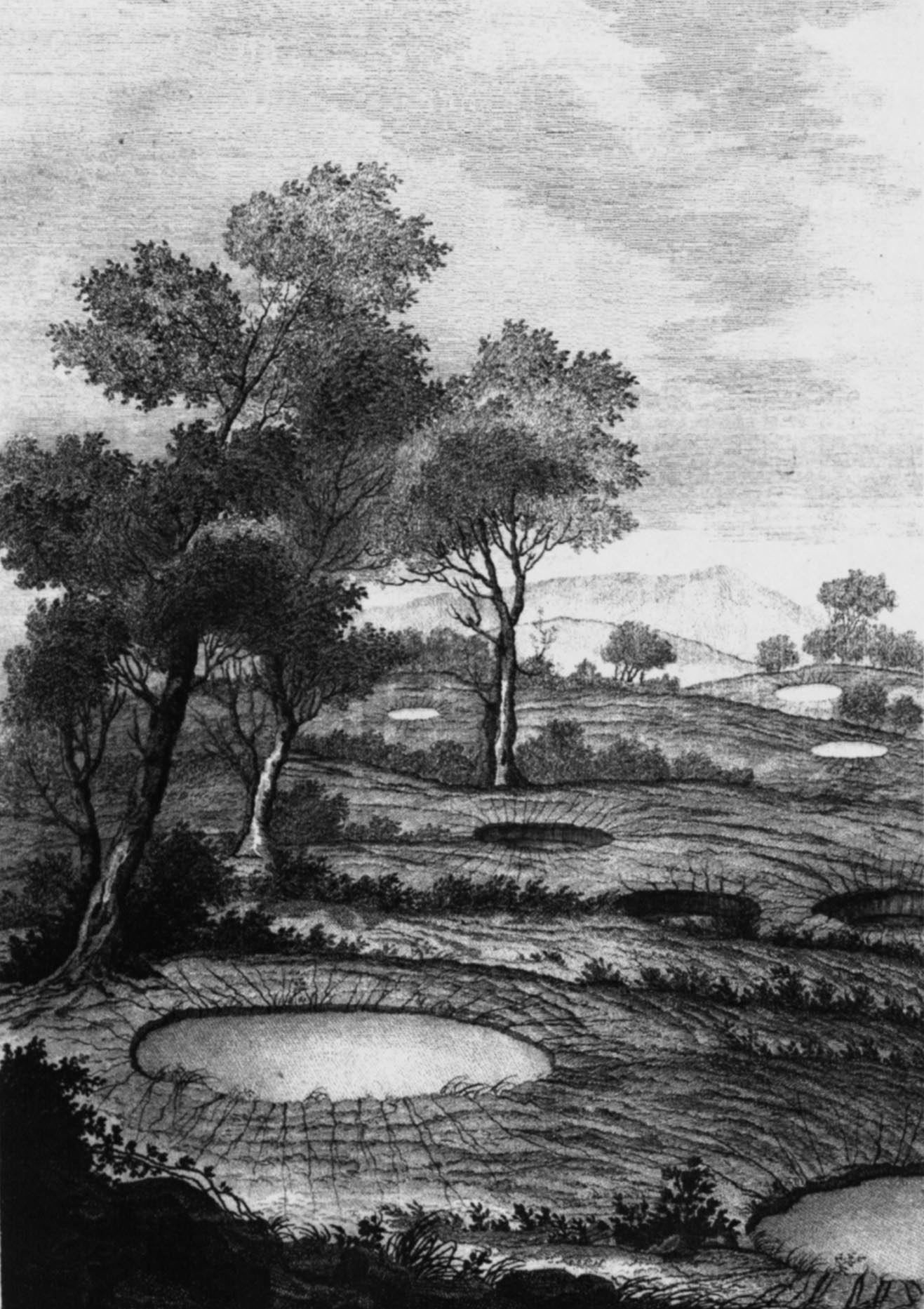
1783 Calabrian earthquakes. Note the phenomenon of soil liquefaction.

In 1783, a series of earthquakes across Calabria caused around 50,000 deaths and damaged property. Many of the buildings were rebuilt thereafter.

In 1733, after the outbreak of the War of Polish Succession, the Spanish Bourbons, allies of France against Austria, decided to attack Naples and secure that kingdom for Charles VII. Charles, who entered Naples in 1734, defeated the Austrian troops at the Battle of Bitonto, securing control of the kingdom, despite pockets of resistance, including Reggio Calabria, which fell on 20 June 1734.

For ten years, however, the young Bourbon monarchy had to cope with the intrigues of the Austrian party present in Naples. This was particularly strong in Calabria, where the Duke of Verzino promised the Austrians that he could arm 12,000 rebels for their cause of reconquest during the War of Austrian Succession. The Duke had already armed an infantry regiment against the Infante in 1734. But after the Battle of Velletri in 1744, in which Charles VII repelled an Austrian invasion, the Austrian party disappeared, decimated by the Bourbon trials and inquisitions.

Charles VII of Naples ascension aroused enthusiasm throughout the Mezzogiorno, as the population hoped that the resources of the Kingdom of Naples would be used for the development of state and social structures. Sicily, too, united politically with southern Italy; this was an advantage for Calabria, which moved to the center of the state structure. This was seen in Charles' popular journey in 1735, while on his way to Palermo to be crowned King of Sicily. He visited Calabria Citeriore, Sibari, Corigliano, Rossano, Cirò and Strongoli. Charles met the Dean of Catanzaro on the borders of Calabria Ulterior, stopped in Crotone and in Cutro, and stayed four days in Catanzaro, before visiting Monteleone and then Palmi. From there, Charles embarked for Messina.

From the earliest years the reforming action of King Charles, aided by Tuscan minister Bernardo Tanucci, was aimed at strengthening central power at the expense of baronial and clerical power. He also worked to alleviate the social and economic conditions of the poor, with at best modest results, due to the resistance of the local ruling classes, fighting to protect their privileges and particularistic interests. One particularly reformed field was economic and fiscal: in 1739 the Supreme Magistrate of Commerce was created, consisting of magistrates, technicians, merchants and bankers, with absolute jurisdiction over trade.

In 1741 a Concordat was made with the Holy See, allowing ecclesiastical properties in the Kingdom of Naples to be taxed, while in the same period the Catasto onciario was commissioned, so called because it was measured in ounces (nominal currency equal to 6 ducats or 60 carlins), which was supposed to reorder the tax burden by lowering taxes on the poorest. However, nobles and clergymen enjoyed exemptions that protected their interests.

In 1759, however, King Charles, as a result of diplomatic agreements and complicated family events, had to abdicate the throne of Naples to secure the crown of Spain after the death of his half-brother Ferdinand VI. The Kingdom of Naples passed to Charles' eight-year-old son, Ferdinand IV of the Two Sicilies, under the tutelage of a regency council dominated by Tanucci. This allowed the continuation of the minister's reform policies, particularly in the ecclesiastical field. This culminated in the expulsion of the Jesuits from the Kingdom in 1769 and the forfeiture of their property. Even after Ferdinand came of age, Tanucci remained in office, but in 1774 he was exonerated at the instigation of Queen Maria Carolina of Austria, who wanted to bring Naples into the Austrian sphere of influence. However, the king continued season, pandering to the Neapolitan Enlightenment (Ferdinando Galiani, Antonio Genovesi and Gaetano Filangeri).

During this period Calabria experienced major natural disasters, accompanied by social and economic changes: the plague arrived in 1743, striking Reggio Calabria and its surroundings from Messina, delaying the compilation of the cadastre onciario by local universities. The earthquake of 1783 struck southern Calabria killing some 50,000 and destroying Reggio, which was rebuilt according to more rational and linear architectural criteria. TKing Ferdinand IV sent the prince of Strongoli, Francesco Pignatelli, to cope with emergencies in the earthquake-affected areas. To finance the immense reconstruction expenses, he established the Cassa Sacra, to manage funds derived from the expropriation of abolished ecclesiastical property and monasteries. In the event wealthy landowners, members of the nascent agrarian bourgeoisie in search of social status, bought the best land.

Ferdinand's reforms ended shortly after the French Revolution. Revolutionary ideas were spreading across continental Europe thanks to the invasion of French revolutionary armies, alarming the courts of the Old Regime. Ferdinand IV in 1supported joined the anti-French coalition and marched with his army to Rome, where Pope Pius VI had been deposed and the Roman Republic proclaimed. The Bourbon army had to retreat after initial successes, pursued by French troops supporting the Italian Jacobin revolutionaries. It moved from Naples to Sicily, while on 21 January 1799, the Parthenopean Republic was proclaimed. Its formation document was drafted by the Calabrian Jacobin Giuseppe Logoteta.

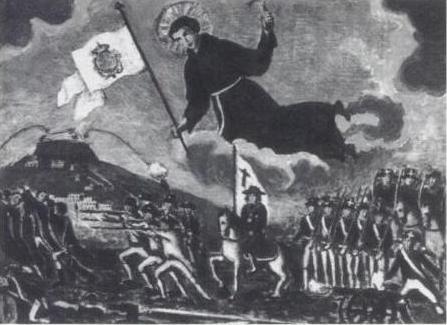
Popular illustration of the time depicting St. Anthony of Padua protecting the Christian and Royal Army, with Cardinal Fabrizio Ruffo on horseback, during its advance and fighting

The new republican regime, however, did not fare well in the Mezzogiorno, especially in Calabria, where only Cosenza, Catanzaro and Crotone adhered to the republican cause, while the large Ionian centers and the area opposite the Sicilian coast, such as Reggio Calabria, Scilla, Bagnara and Palmi, remained loyal to the Bourbons. The Bourbon royals, in exile in Palermo expected that they would be able to regain the kingdom. Ferdinand gladly accepted Cardinal Fabrizio Ruffo's proposal to mobilize the peasant masses of Calabria under the name of the king and religion, form an army and recapture Naples.

Having received, on 7 February 1799, the title of “Vicar of the King”, Cardinal Ruffo landed the next day in Calabria, recruiting among the family fiefs of Scilla and Bagnara. Soon Ruffo's army, dubbed the Army of the Holy Faith, marched under the banners of the Church and the throne. It grew to 25,000 men, to which were added bands of brigands, stragglers, and deserters. The cardinal succeeded in conquering and sacking Paola and Crotone, despite Ruffo's attempts to prevent the looting and violence. In four months it reconquered the Kingdom of Naples. He granted in June 1799 an honorable surrender to the last Neapolitan Jacobins barricaded at Fort Saint Elmo. However, this was not respected by the Bourbon rulers or Admiral Horatio Nelson, who, reneged and hanged 124 Neapolitan revolutionaries, depriving Ruffo of his command.

== French interlude and the Bourbon restoration ==
King Ferdinand was unable to consolidate his power. In 1806, faced with a French invasion by Napoleon Bonaparte's troops, he again had to take refuge in Palermo under the protection of the British navy. The Kingdom of Naples was entrusted by Napoleon to older brother Joseph Bonaparte. Numerous revolts did not mar in the continental Mezzogiorno, such as in Calabria, where the Calabrian Insurrection broke out, carried out by brigands, peasants and army stragglers, supported by British military units. To tame the three year long revolt, Napoleon committed two of the best French generals, André Masséna and Jean Maximilien Lamarque, who employed ruthless means, such as reprisal against entire villages that supported the brigands, as in the massacre of Lauria, perpetrated by Massena's soldiers.

In spite of this, Napoleonic rule drove social and economic innovations and upheavals: on 2 August 1806, Joseph Bonaparte decreed the end of feudalism. He abolished baronial jurisdictions, feudal-like personal benefits, and prohibitory rights, i.e., monopolies on specific productive activities. Lands and property were put into liquidation and opened for commercial exploitation by the French government. These were purchased by members of the agrarian bourgeoisie, which was gaining political clout. By decree of 8 December 1806, the territory was divided into districts and boroughs: Calabria retained the division of the two provinces of “Citeriore,” whose capital remained in Cosenza, and “Ulteriore,”” which had Monteleone assigned as its administrative seat, because of its relative ease of communication and military necessity. The provinces were presided over by an intendant and were divided into four districts, placed under the jurisdiction of their respective sub-districts, which in turn were divided into districts, each of which grouped a certain number of municipalities. In 1810 Joseph Bonaparte was replaced by Joachim Murat, Napoleon's brother-in-law (husband of Caroline Bonaparte). The new king accelerated social and economic modernization: he reformed the tax system, replacing the Bourbon tax levies such as the testatico, the focatico and the tassa d'industria, with a single direct land tax; from 1811 he initiated government inquiries to learn about the living conditions of rural populations, while showing an interest in mineral resources, as in the case of the mines connected to the Mongiana ironworks in the Serre.

Napoleonic rule ended in 1815, after Napoleon's defeat at Waterloo. The deposed Bourbon ruler returnedto the throne, despite Murat's attempt to regain the throne with a small military expedition. The former king landed in Pizzo Calabro, but was betrayed and captured by Bourbon troops. He was sentenced to death by a military tribunal presided over by General Vito Nunziante and shot, on 13 October 1815, in the castle. Having returned to the throne and consolidated his power, the Bourbon king unified the two kingdoms he ruled. With the law of 16 December 1816, the Kingdom of the Two Sicilies was born, with Ferdinand as its first monarch, dubbedFerdinand I of the Two Sicilies.

== Carbonari uprisings to the Expedition of the Thousand ==
The return of the Bourbons brought absolute monarchial power. The new rules adopted and extended the French administrative reforms, as these enabled tighter control by the central government. In Calabria, a royal decree of 1 May 1816 created two new administrative divisions: the province of Calabria Ulteriore Prima, and Calabria Ulteriore Seconda.

The ruler's absolutism generated liberal opposition, led by bourgeois leaders who prospered under French rule shunted aside by aristocratic and clerical groups for reasons of social class. They were mainly army officers, but also bourgeois, intellectuals, and civil servants, including adherents of the Carbonari sect/. The sect was founded to create an Italy independent of foreign domination and to force Italian sovereigns to grant a liberal constitution. Thus, on 1 July 1820, after the news of Spain's Constitution of Cadiz, many Carbonari officers, including cavalry second lieutenants Giuseppe Silvati and Michele Morelli (the latter from Calabria), marched with their regiments from Nola to force Ferdinand I to enact a Constitution, gathering supporters along the journey. The ruler gave in to popular pressure and granted the constitutional charter. The liberal experiment was short-lived, as Ferdinand secretly called Austrian troops to the rescue. They crushed the Carbonari uprisings. The main leaders, were hanged in September 1822.

After the death of Ferdinand I in 1825 and the brief reign of his son Francis I, 20-year-old Ferdinand II (son of Francis I) ascended the throne in 1830. He enacted partial economic and administrative reforms:

- cutting the civil list
- abolishing some unnecessary court expenses
- reducing ministers' salaries
- recalling former Murattian officers into the army
- reorganizing the army

The new ruler, however, did not accept political and institutional reforms demandede by the liberals. Instead he propped up the police regime established by his predecessors and crushed any hint of revolt. However, unlike his forbears, Ferdinand II was aware of conditions in the outlying provinces and made official trips to visit them. The first came on 7 April 1833, when the king visited Calabria and surroundings, returning to the capital on May 6. During his visit he granted pardons, decreed bridges and roads, corrected arbitrary actions of public administrators and bestowed substantial relief to earthquake victims of the 8 March 1832 earthquake that damaged the Crati and Coraci basin.

Before the outbreak of the revolutions of 1848, Calabria was the scene of uprisings, all of which were suppressed. The protagonists were from other parts of Italy, such as the Venetian Bandiera brothers, who arrived in 1844 to lend support to the Cosenza revolt. They were betrayed by one of their comrades, captured by the gendarmerie, and executed in August after a summary trial. Calabrians such as the Five Martyrs of Gerace (Michele Bello, Pietro Mazzoni, Gaetano Ruffo, Domenico Salvadori and Rocco Verduci) in 1847 tried to make the Gerace district rise up as part of the Mazzinian uprising in Reggio Calabria and Messina on 2 September 1847, were shot after the suppression of the uprising.

When King Ferdinand II enacted a liberal constitution in January 1848 in the wake of popular demonstrations, many southern liberals were elected in the parliamentary elections. However, on 5 May 1848, in a coup d'état, he dissolved Parliament and bombed rebellious Naples, causing more than 1,000 deaths. Insurrectional committees arose in Calabria: the most organized were from Cosenza and Catanzaro, which raised arms, funds and volunteers to resist. Despite their efforts, divisions over how to conduct military operations compromised their efforts and the Calabrian insurgents were dispersed by the arrival of 5,000 Bourbon soldiers under Generals Nunziante and Busacca. Political repression followed the defeat, manifested in death sentences or life in prison (some in absentia) of the major leaders.

This caused the final rift between the Bourbon monarchy and the liberal bourgeoisie, which soon joined the Italian unification cause. Counting on this connection. Giuseppe Garibaldi landed on the Calabrian coast, at Melito di Porto Salvo, on 19 August 1860, after conquering Sicily. The Calabrian insurgents led by Agostino Plutino from Reggio backed the Garibaldi volunteers. With their aid, at the 21 August Battle of Piazza Duomo, Garibaldi conquered Reggio Calabria. He disarmed as many as 12,000 of Colonel Vial's men at Soveria Mannelli. Garibaldi's army then marched on Naples, entering on September 6. The Battle of the Volturno (26 September-2 October 1860) averted the Bourbon reconquest of Naples. The Meeting of Teano between Garibaldi and King Victor Emmanuel II of Savoy took place on 26 October 1860, where he annexed Mezzogiorno.

On 19 August 1860, Calabria was invaded from Sicily by Giuseppe Garibaldi and his Redshirts as part of the Expedition of the Thousand. Through King Francesco II of Naples had dispatched 16,000 soldiers to stop the Redshirts, who numbered about 3,500, after a token battle at Reggio Calabria won by the Redshirts, all resistance ceased and Garibaldi was welcomed as a liberator from the oppressive rule of the Bourbons wherever he went in Calabria. Calabria together with the rest of the Kingdom of Naples was incorporated in 1861 into the Kingdom of Italy. Garibaldi planned to complete the Risorgimento by invading Rome, still ruled by the pope protected by a French garrison, and began with semi-official encouragement to raise an army. Subsequently, King Victor Emmanuel II decided the possibility of war with France was too dangerous, and on 29 August 1862 Garibaldi's base in the Calabrian town of Aspromonte was attacked by the Regio Esercito. The Battle of Aspromonte ended with the Redshirts defeated with several being executed after surrendering while Garibaldi was badly wounded.

With the plebiscite of 21 October 1860, Calabria and the other southern provinces became part of the Kingdom of Sardinia: consequently, elections were called to allow the newly annexed territories to select representation in Parliament. The election was held on 27 January 1861, and the new Parliament was inaugurated in Turin on February 18. The first and most important measure was the founding of the Kingdom of Italy, proclaimed on 17 March 1861 with Victor Emmanuel II as constitutional monarch. The method of voting between the plebiscite and the parliamentary elections was different: in 1860 all male citizens who were at least 21 years of age and in possession of civil rights was able to vote, while the next round of elections was governed by Piedmontese electoral law, which was census-based and enfranchise only male citizens who were at least 25 years of age, able to read and write and who paid at least 40 liras in taxes. The narrower voting group elected many members of the aristocratic and upper middle class. This included many Calabrian patriots, such as Francesco Stocco and the brothers Antonino Plutino and Agostino Plutino, the historical right with liberal and conservative tendencies, and the historical left with progressive and democratic ideas.

Map of Calabrian railways in 1885 (top) and in 1915 (bottom)
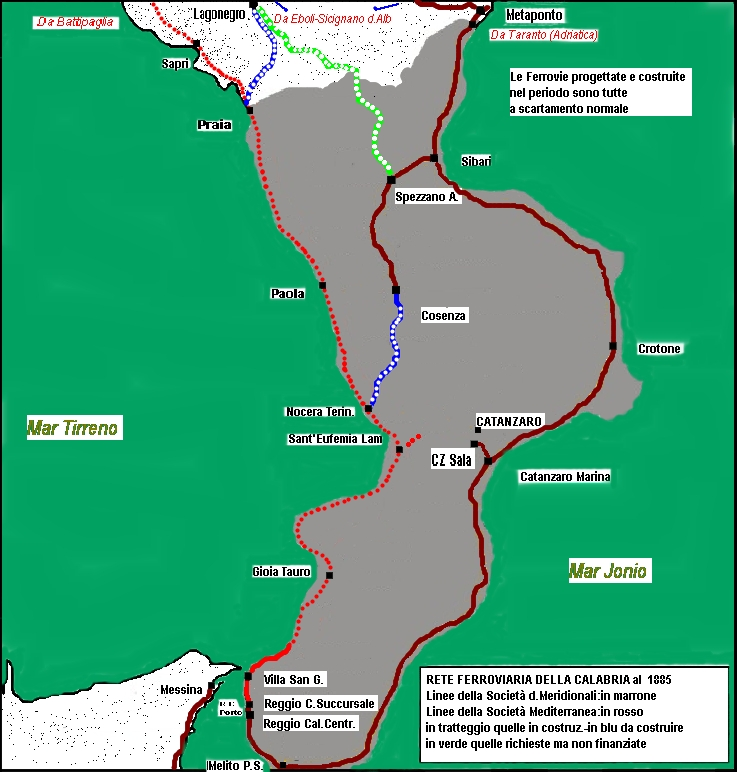
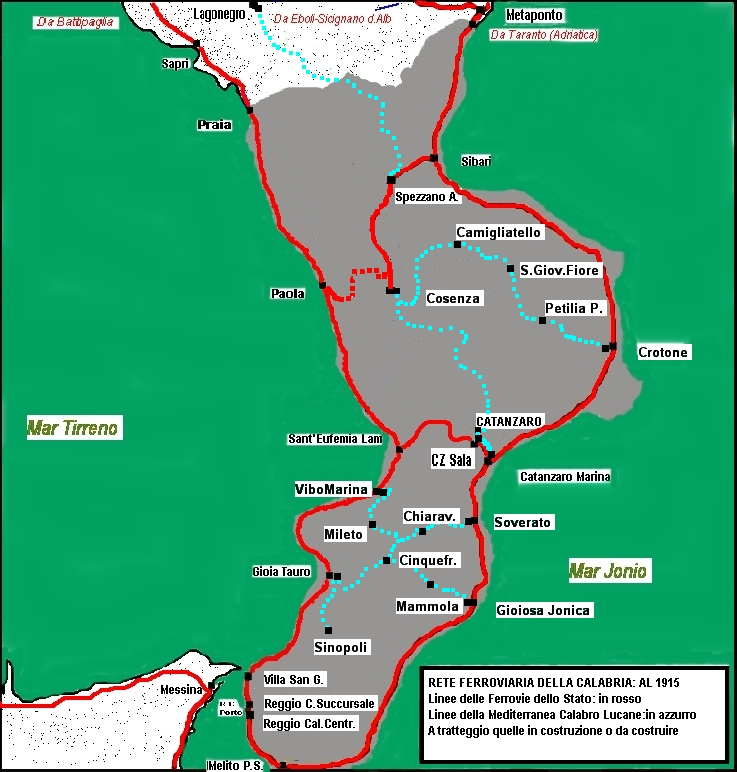

The political clash focused on how to complete the Unification of Italy, which then lacked Venice and Rome. The moderates wanted national completion through diplomatic agreements and French mediation, while the Democrats were more inclined to engage the Italian army.

This diversity was on display in 1862, with the Battle of Aspromonte. Garibaldi attempted to repeat the Expedition of the Thousand, starting from Sicily and moving toward Rome to take it from the Pope and merge it into the Kingdom of Italy. Urbano Rattazzi, head of the historical Left, who had become the Kingsom'a most influential politician, enjoyed the confidence of the sovereign, and was in government.

When Garibaldi went to Sicily in the summer of 1862, the government basically did not intervene. When Napoleon III, protector of Pope Pius IX, threatened to send a French expeditionary force to defend the Church, both Victor and Rattazzi retreated: the monarch issued a proclamation disavowing the Garibaldian action, while the government mobilized the army to stop the general.

After landing on 25 August 1862 at Melito di Porto, Salvo led 3,000 men. Garibaldi was met with gunfire from a military unit from Reggio: the Garibaldini fell back to the mountainous massif of Aspromonte, where they marched for three days, encamping near Gambarie. On August 29, Garibaldi's volunteers were attacked by a military column commanded by Colonel Emilio Pallavicini: after a brief firefight in which both sides suffered casualties, Garibaldi ordered a cease-fire. His left ankle wounded, he surrendered to Pallavicini, who transported him to La Spezia, where he was imprisoned in the Varignano fortress.

Although he was later amnestied, the affair caused a political earthquake in Italy, culminating in Rattazzi's resignation as head of government and accusations against the King that he had misled Garibaldi about the feasibility of the enterprise, and abandoned him when he became inconvenient.

Calabria was the scene of post-unification brigandage, which was endemic in the Mezzogiorno. It also connoted legitimist aspirations during the transition between Bourbon and Italian rule. Bourbon legitimists and the government of Francis II of the Two Sicilies (in exile in Rome) attempted to guide the bands of brigands in the south, who attacked exponents of the liberal regime (the “galantuomini”). They were typically supporters of the agrarian bourgeoisie.

José Borjes led the Borjes Expedition, a Bourbon legitimist attempt to reconquer the Kingdom of Naples. Borjes was a Catalan general distinguished in the Carlist wars in Spain. He attempted to imitate Cardinal Fabrizio Ruffo's Sanfedist expedition sixty years earlier. After receiving reassurance that the local population would support his cause, Borjes departed from Malta and landed in Brancaleone on 14 September 1861 with 21 men.

Borjes' goal was to make contact with the brigands and unite them to reconquer Neapolitan territory. To this end, he joined the band of Ferdinando Mittiga, a brigand chief operating in the area in command of 120 men. Disagreements arose, because the brigand wanted to assault Platì and take revenge on the local liberals, unlike Borjes, who eventually gave in. The unsuccessful assault took place on September 17. The brigands and legitimists were repelled by the National Guards and a regular army unit. This failure soon ended their collaboration. On October 20 Borjes traveled to Basilicata to join his forces with those of Carmine Crocco. They achieved successes, but not the final objective, as the brigand leader refused to turn his men into a regular army.

Noting the failure of the plan, the Catalan general attempted to travel to Rome to report to the Bourbon ruler. He was captured in Tagliacozzo and shot on 8 December 1861. Borjes' failure did not end brigandage, which continued with greater virulence. For this reason, the first Minghetti government promulgated the Pica law on 15 August 1863. It was a regulation that suspended constitutional guarantees for the southern provinces and imposed a state of siege. It delivered brigands to military tribunals, without appeal or defense. In Calabria the law was applied in Citeriore and Calabria Ulteriore Seconda, while the Reggio area, as was the area around Naples and part of Apulia were exempted. The Pica law remained in force until 31 December 1865, and contributed to eradicating banditry, albeit with repressive methods and without resolving the southern territories' social and economic problems.

An underlying issue was latifundium (estates), which were in the hands of a few economic and political elites. They formed the backbone of the southern political class. Illiteracy peaked in the Mezzogiorno at 90%. Even the extension of the Casati Law to the entire Kingdom, which introduced compulsory schooling for two years did not produce the hoped-for effects: the municipalities had to provide for the construction and maintenance of school buildings, as well as the recruitment and payment of elementary teachers, which was impossible for many southern municipalities, which did not build schools because they often had negative budgets orlacked the political will to start an effective school education system, as local leaders feared its potential and social claims. The same was true for the next school reform, the Coppino Law of 1877, which raised compulsory schooling to 9 years of age and granted low-interest loans to municipalities that built school buildings: southern municipalities, however, often did not get the work started, as they feared that the new school measure would make the peasant masses more aware of their rights, and thus local notables would lose their electoral clientele.

In national politics, there were numerous Calabrian politicians, often with a Risorgimento past behind them, who held important roles in the various Italian governments of that period: Giovanni Nicotera, participant of the Sapri Expedition and comrade of Carlo Pisacane, minister of the interior in the governments of Agostino Depretis and Antonio Di Rudinì, who headed a Left political formation called the Pentarchy because it included the major leaders of the historical Left (Rudinì, Francesco Crispi, Giuseppe Zanardelli, Alfredo Baccarini and Benedetto Cairoli), hostile to Depretis' transformist policies; Luigi Miceli, Mazzinian and Garibaldian, minister of Agriculture, Industry and Commerce in the third Cairoli government; Bernardino Grimaldi, minister of Finance in the first Crispi government and the first Giolitti government, culminated in the 1893 Banca Romana Scandal.

During the 1880s, the economic conditions of the Mezzogiorno worsened, and its agricultural economy was severely damaged by the customs war that began between Italy and France in 1889: in fact, to protect its fragile industrial fabric, the Italian government raised import duties on foreign goods, to which France responded by shutting down imports of Italian agricultural goods, sending many southern farms into ruin. This, combined with the severe economic repression of those years, stimulated the phenomenon of emigration, especially to America, a fact that, while it decreased the demand for labor, left entire regions and countries depopulated and deprived these territories of their best energies. A case in point is Castrovillari and its surrounding area, which in 1901 recorded a decrease of 7,190 people due to transoceanic emigration.

The Nord (north) of Italy and the Mezzogiorno (the south) were at different levels of economic development. The Mezzogiorno was ignored under the Kingdom of Italy due to its backward status. In the late 19th century about 70% of the Mezzogiorno was illiterate; the government did not invest in education there.

Owing to the Roman Question, until 1903 the Roman Catholic Church prohibited on pain of excommunication Catholic men from voting in Italian elections. The devout Catholics of Calabria tended to boycott elections, so the deputies were typically the products of the clientistic system, representing the aristocracy. They voted against money for education on the grounds that an educated population would demand changes that would threaten the traditional elite. Society in the late 19th century Calabria was dominated by an organized crime group known as 'Ndrangheta. Like the Mafia in Sicily and the Camorra in Campania, they formed a "parallel state" with significant power. Between 1901 and 1914 Calabrians began emigrating in large numbers, mostly for North and South America, peaking in 1905 at 62,690.

On 28 December 1908, Calabria and Sicily were devastated by an earthquake and following tsunami, killing some 80,000. Within hours, ships of the British and Russian navies arrived to assist the survivors, while it took the Regia Marina two days to send a relief expedition from Naples. The ineffectual response was caused by feuding officials who refused to co-operate with each other contributed to the death toll. It took weeks for aid to reach some villages, causing much resentment in Calabria. To offset widespread criticism that the government in Rome did not care about Calabria, King Victor Emmanuel III personally took over the relief operation and toured the destroyed villages of Calabria, which won the government a measure of popularity. Notably, after the king took charge, the feuding ceased and aid started to flow.

== War/post-war ==
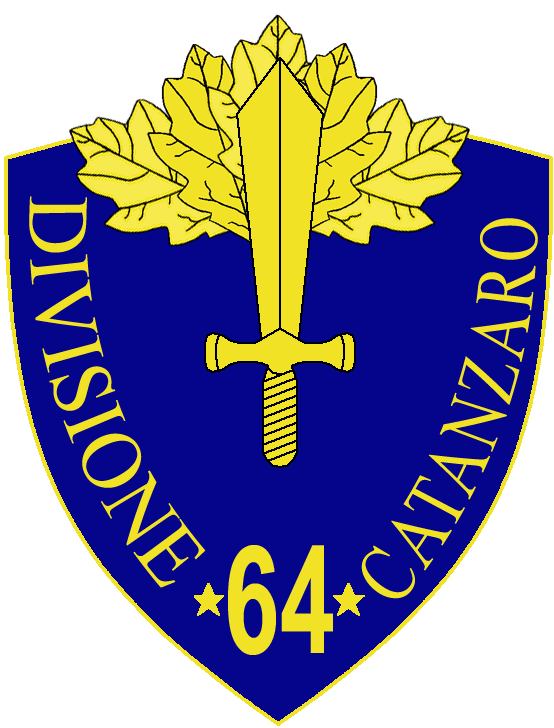
Coat of arms of the 64th Infantry Division “Catanzaro”

In World War I Calabria dispatched five brigades to the effort, most notably the Catanzaro Brigade. It was formed of the 141st and 142nd regiments, composed almost exclusively of Calabrians. It was one of the units most committed by the Royal Army in the war. Part of the Third Army under the command of the king's cousin the Duke of Aosta, it participated in the Third Battle of the Isonzo, where, on Monte San Michele, between 17 and 26 October 1915, it lost almost half of its personnel (about 6,000 men). In addition, during the Strafexpedition of June 1916, the 141st Brigade Regiment lost 38% of its components, with 333 casualties.

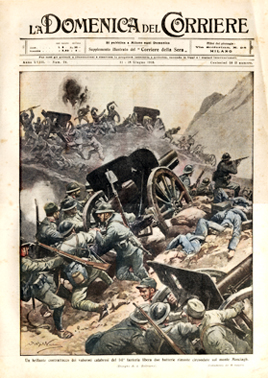
Cover of La Domenica del Corriere dedicated to the Catanzaro Brigade

While it was decorated for valor in the conflict, it also triggered the only episode of open rebellion on the Italian front, in June 1917. The cause was the order to return to the trenches despite the fact that the soldiers had just been sent to the rear to rest. Many soldiers from the 142nd Regiment revolted against the officers, killing three of them along with four carabinieri. After quelling the rebellion with the help of cavalry, mobile artillery and carabinieri, the General Staff decided to punish the Brigade, as a warning against other uprisings: 28 soldiers were shot, while the survivors were sent back to the front under armed escort. The Duke investigated the causes of the rebellion while serving on the Karst Plateau. He blamed the unequal treatment versus other brigades, which enjoyed easier rest shifts. The report of General Tettoni, commander of VII Army Corps, instead blamed it on socialist propaganda and newspaper reports of the Czar's defeat in Russia.

The mostly peasant soldiers had been promised an allocation of land derived from large estates after the war. The lack of political will in the implementation of this promise, together with nationalistic tensions due to the Fiume and Dalmatian question, generated a climate of resentment and social unrest, which turned into strikes, anti-government demonstrations and occupations of uncultivated land by the peasants, who organized in leagues or federations of different political colorings. On 2 September 1919, the Francesco Saverio Nitti government issued the Visocchi Decree (named after the Minister of Agriculture, Achille Visocchi), which gave prefects the power to temporarily assign uncultivated land for four years to peasants formed in legally constituted leagues or agrarian bodies. A permit issued by a committee composed equally of peasant and landowner representatives, under prefectorial control, was required to obtain the assignment, which specified the duration of occupation and the rental price (paid by the peasants). However, seven months later, the redistribution had limited effects: only an estimated 27,000 hectares were allocated. The decree was criticized by both conservatives and socialists: Arrigo Serpieri, later minister of agriculture in the Fascist period, judged the measure “one of the most infamous of the postwar period”, while socialist Filippo Turati deemed it too “timid”.

== Fascism ==
In the 1920 parliamentary elections nationalist candidates dominated thanks to the support of ex-combatants (Saraceni lost his Castrovillari constituency to a candidate supported by veterans). The Italian Socialist Party became the country's leading political force with as many as 156 deputies in Parliament, found itself divided between the maximalist current, advocating revolution, and the reformist current, in favor of dialogue. This division led first to the expulsion of the reformists, such as Turati and Bissolati (who later founded the Unitary Socialist Party), then to a split at the Livorno Congress in 1921, which led to the birth of the Communist Party of Italy (later the Italian Communist Party). That year the National Fascist Party was officially founded by Benito Mussolini, a former socialist expelled for his interventionist positions on the eve of World War I. The party evolved from the Fasci di Combattimento, founded in Milan in 1919 on an initially revolutionary/nationalist program. Fascist squads assaulted the armed wing of the movement, whose members were truncheoned and forced to drink castor oil (a purgative). The squadron was immediately financed by large industrial groups and agrarians, fearful of a possible Bolshevik revolution. This came in the wake of the so-called biennio rosso, and was often not countered by the police, who often sided with the fascists.

In Calabria, too, the fascist squads went to work. On 21 September 1922, in Casignana, a small town in Aspromonte, carabinieri and fascists opened fire on laborers from the “Garibaldi” agricultural cooperative, who had organized an occupation of land owned by the prince of Roccella. They killed socialist alderman Pasquale Micchia and two peasants, Rosario Conturno and Girolamo Panetta, while mayor Francesco Ceravolo was seriously wounded; this massacre ended the occupation. On 4 October 1922, at the inauguration of the Casignana Fascio, shots were fired, wounding a fascist who was part of his entourage. In retaliation, the fascists ravaged the house of the president of the “Garibaldi” cooperative, while the Carabinieri arrested a dozen antifascists. These events inspired writer Mario La Cava for his novel, The Facts of Casignana.

The penetration of fascism into Calabrian society reflected the rest of the country: in city areas, merchants and industrialists were promoters of the fascists, who gained the support of the forces of law and order; in rural areas, by contrast, the backbone of fascism was represented by large landowners and village notables, who joined the new party.

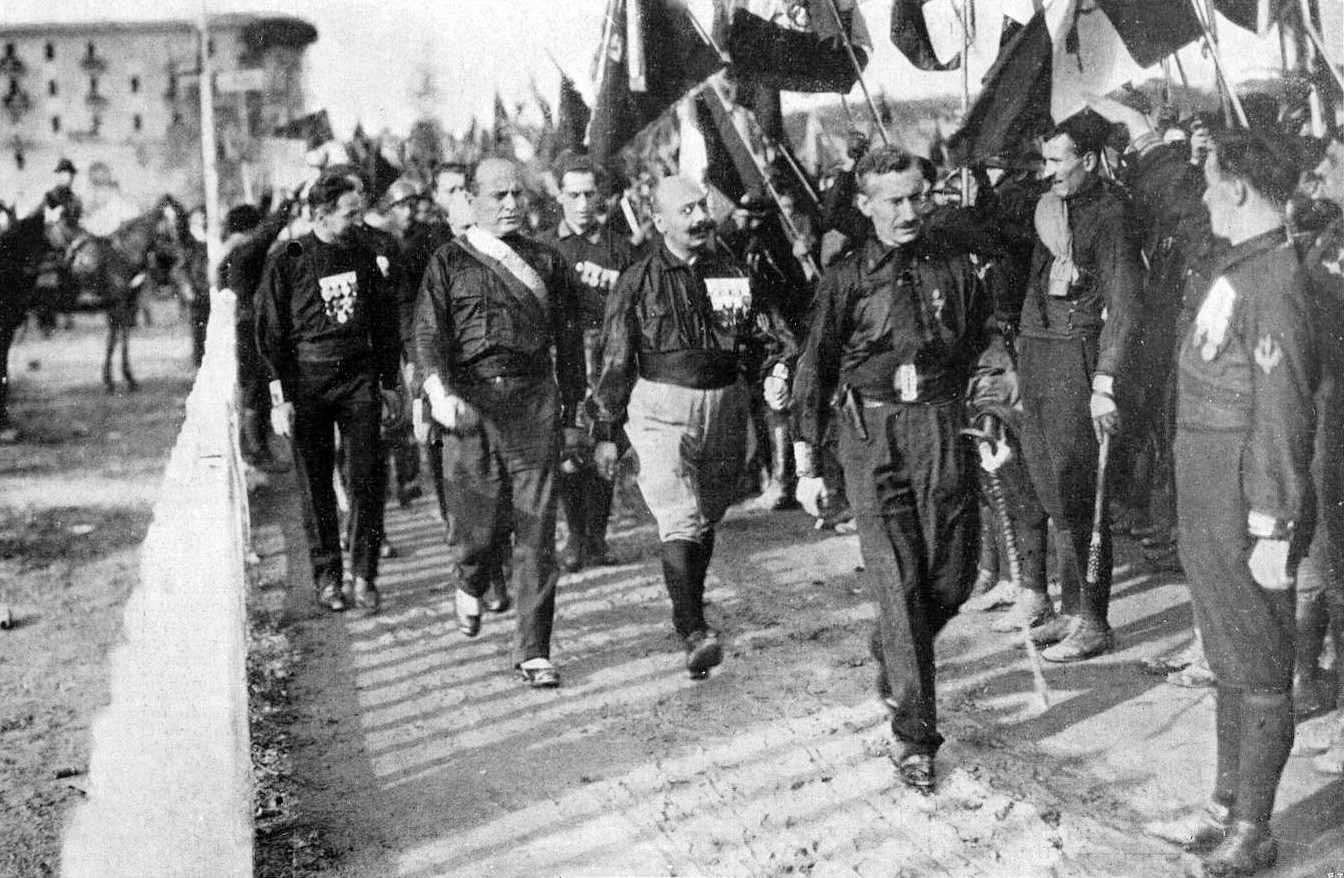
Italo Balbo, Benito Mussolini, Cesare Maria de Vecchi and Michele Bianchi review the 40,000 fascists deployed at the Naples sports field.

After fascism came to power with the March on Rome on 28 October 1922, a centralized dictatorial regime began in the southern region, strengthened after the assassination of socialist deputy Giacomo Matteotti in 1924 and formalized with the Leggi fascistissime of 1925–1926, which outlawed all political parties except the fascist party, censored the press, and banned trade unions and strikes. In addition, mayoral elections were abolished, replaced by podestà, appointed by the prefect, with absolute powers in political and economic management.

During this period, the most representative Calabrian political personality was Michele Bianchi, a native of Belmonte Calabro, who was a close associate of Mussolini and quadrumviral of the 1922 March on Rome, in addition to holding the posts of deputy, undersecretary at the Ministry of the Interior and, finally, minister of Public Works. In this capacity, which he held until his death in 1930, he had a number of infrastructures built in Calabria, such as the Camigliatello Silano ski resort (initially called Camigliatello Bianchi), as well as promoting public works in Cosenza while Tommaso Arnoni was mayor (1925–1934).

In December 1924 a false rumor spread in Reggio Calabria that Benito Mussolini had resigned as Prime Minister because of the Matteotti affair, leading to joyous all-night celebrations. In the morning, the people learned that Mussolini was still prime minister. Several Fascist officials were dismissed for not suppressing the celebrations. The aristocracy and gentry of Calabria, through generally not ideologically Fascist, saw the regime as a force for order and stability, and supported the dictatorship. The prefects and the policemen of Calabria were conservatives who saw themselves as serving King Victor Emmanuel III first and Mussolini second, but supported Fascism over Socialism and Communism and persecuted anti-Fascists. Traditional elites in Calabria joined the Fascist Party, and local branches of Fascist Party were characterized by jostling for power and influence between elite families.

In spite of this, conditions in Calabria under the Fascist regime did not improve, as evidenced by surveys conducted by meridionalists (and antifascists) Umberto Zanotti Bianco and Manlio Rossi Doria in 1928 and reported in Tra la perduta gente, which analyzed the social and economic conditions of Africo, a village in Aspromonte that was ruined by the 1908 earthquake and geographically isolated. It was plagued by disease, infant mortality and taxation, lacked a doctor and school (classes were held in the teacher's bedroom), while the inhabitants ate bread from lentils and chickpeas.

The government attempted to maintain the rural character of the country, introducing restrictions and disincentives to peasants and laborers to move to the city. Urban areas still developed, as demonstrated by the Grande Reggio project.

The first Reggio podestà, Giuseppe Genoese Zerbi. pushed urban expansion and amalgamation. He merged as many as fourteen neighboring municipalities and suburbs to the city on the Strait.although four, by government decree of 26 January 1933, broke away to form Villa San Giovanni (Campo Calabro and Fiumara again became autonomous after the war). The urban population thus exceeded 100,000. The reasons for this restructuring included a desire to speed up earthquake reconstruction, to make trade and communication by sea easier, and to entice emigration from small mountain towns into an urban center. During the 1920s and 1930s Reggio Calabria modernized, building new neighborhoods. Social housing districts sprang up and public facilities such as the Reggio di Calabria Centrale railway station, the National Museum of Magna Graecia and the Francesco Cilea Municipal Theater were built.

Other cities benefited from the Fascist building policy. Minister of Public Works Luigi Razza built a new municipal palace for his hometown of Monteleone di Calabria (renamed Vibo Valentia). Vibo Valentia named its military airport, stadium, a square and a street in the historic center after Razza.

As with the rest of Italy, Calabria's maximum support for fascism came with the Second Italo-Ethiopian War of 1935–1936, in which many Calabrians participated, momentarily relieving the region's prevailing misery with soldier's remittances. Many members of the Calabrian clergy supported the war. This marked the pinnacle of collaboration between Church and State following the Lateran Pacts of 1929. For example, the Archbishop of Reggio Calabria, Carmelo Pujia, an interventionist on the eve of World War, had a prayer composed praising the glory of the homeland and the Italian flag.

Under the Fascist regime, concentration camps were built in Calabria and used to imprison foreigners whose presence was considered undesirable, such as Chinese immigrants and foreign (though not Italian) Jews together with members of the Romani minority, whose nomadic lifestyle was viewed as anti-social. The camps operated from 1938 to 1943. They were harsh, but not death camps, (the majority of those imprisoned survived).

== World War 2 ==
On 10 June 1940, with Italy's declaration of war on France and the United Kingdom, Calabria became involved in World War II. The civilian population immediately began to suffer from starvation and undernourishment, due to the lack of labor, low wages and inflation. Some foodstuffs were already rationed, while others, such as meat and sugar, could be found only on the black market. The large landowners took advantage, appropriating crops that were destined for storage and reselling them on the black market. Allied bombardments sapped civilian morale.

On 3 September 1943, British and Canadian troops of the Eighth Army landed in Calabria in Operation Baytown, the first time that the Allies landed on the Italian mainland. Those landings were a feint and the main Allied blow came on 8 September 1943 with the landing of the American 5th Army at Salerno in Campania that was intended to cut off Mezzogiorno Axis forces. The Germans anticipated the Allies' plan, and as a consequence, relatively little fighting came in Calabria. Calabria troops mostly surrendered to the advancing British 5th Infantry Division and 1st Canadian Division; relatively few German forces were present. The main obstacle was the trail of destruction left by German combat engineers who systematically blew up bridges and destroyed roads and railroads as the Wehrmacht retreated north. On the day of the American landing, General Dwight Eisenhower announced on the radio that the Armistice of Cassibile had been signed on 3 September, ending all Italian resistance. The Germans pulled their remaining forces out of Calabria to send them to Salerno. Under the Allied occupation, some fascists waged a terrorist struggle on behalf of the Salo republic, although they tended to be concerned about social reforms that might weaken their power while a minority such as Prince Valerio Pignatelli were ideological Fascists. In June 1944, celebrations in Reggio Calabria over the liberation of Rome were disturbed by Fascists.

== Post-liberation ==
Post-liberation Calabria was marked by an economic depression, caused by its backward agricultural sector, its few industries in an “infantile state,” crippled by the catastrophic conflict, shoddy and insufficient roads and aqueducts. To seal the disaster, the territory was battered by Allied bombs and the destruction of the retreating Germans. The Allies were perplexed about the possibility of recovery. In a report to General Harold Alexander, the head of Civil Affairs of the Allied military government, English Major General Francis Rennell Rodd, fearing a resurgence of brigandage, complained about how difficult it was to “govern a discouraged and apathetic population,” with an “incompetent bureaucracy”. This misery pushed the poor into action, exacerbating social tensions.

The Allied military government worked to restart political and administrative life without disrupting the Fascist state. Crowds at town halls demanded food support. Increasingly the demonstrations were led by anti-fascist communist and socialist agitators. Many times these demonstrations became violent riots, resulting in deaths. The first uprising occurred on September 9 in Limbadi. The newly liberated town turned into a battlefield, but without any fatalities. Many towns liberated by Allied forces revolted against their mayors and municipal secretaries. The best known was the November 4 insurrection in Cosenza, initially motivated by hunger and the housing crisis, which quickly turned into a political struggle to remove Fascist mayor Enrico Hendrich, who was ousted by popular vote.

Liberation allowed anti-fascist parties to reemerge, including the Socialist Party, the Communist Party and the Christian Democracy. The latter was a Catholic-inspired organization founded in 1942 as the heir to Don Luigi Sturzo's Italian People's Party. Peasants, who made up about 60% of the population, began a series of violent uprisings demanding better conditions, including land reform. This included the return of large-scale occupations of uncultivated land. On the other side were the elite of agrarians and large landowners, who abandoned Fascism to maintain their position.

In June 1944, Victor Emmanuel III handed power to his son Umberto II of Savoy, who obtained the Lieutenancy of the Kingdom. In July, a month after the liberation of Rome, Calabrian Communist Fausto Gullo, formerly minister of Agriculture in the second Badoglio government and in subsequent administrations (second Bonomi government, third Bonomi government and Parri government), proposed a series of decrees (named after him) to help the peasant class. Among them were: sharecropping reform; grants of uncultivated land to peasants in agricultural cooperatives; compensation to farmers who took their produce to storage, (previously diverted to the black market); and the prohibition of the caporale (day laborer recruiter). These decrees were described by historian Paul Ginsborg as “the only attempt made by leftist government officials to advance on the path of reform”. Gullo, who became “Minister of the Peasants”, achieved two important results: the southern peasants' became aware of the state's support and the laborers' realization that uniting in cooperatives brought them power.

Thanks in part to cooperation with trade unions, especially Giuseppe Di Vittorio's Italian General Confederation of Labour, Gullo's reform efforts were extended with two other decrees. One modified the taxable labor rate. Trade unions were empowered to dictate the number of laborers on a landowner's farmland. The latter allowed trade unionists to manage the labor placements according to seniority. With these measures they prevented war and brought the union onto the side of the peasants.

The Gullo decrees were opposed by the agrarians, using the organized underworld and by enlisting the support the more conservative of the Christian Democrats (CD), who were against the revolutionary government measures. Local Christian Democrats were often involved with the past regime. They succeeded in amending the decrees with provisions that made them unenforceable. Instead, agricultural cooperatives received uncultivated land from a special provincial commission, composed of the president of the Court of Appeals, one representative of the agrarians and one representative of the peasants. These commissions often issued resolutions favorable to the landowners; declared some decrees illegal, such as the one on peasant compensation. The national Communist leadership did not want to disrupt its governing alliance with the Christian Democrats and stayed away from the issues.

The Communists followed the strategy of Secretary Palmiro Togliatti, who preferred a slow transition to democracy instead of revolution, together with Christian Democrat leader Alcide De Gasperi. The Red Republic of Caulonia was proclaimed on 6 March 1945 by Pasquale Cavallaro, mayor of Caulonia. A clash between agrarians and laborers had been increasingly bitter there since January 1944, when Cavallaro was appointed by the prefect of Reggio Calabria, despite his communist faith. He replaced Pasquale Saverio Asciutti, who colluded with fascism. In order to maintain public order, Cavallaro empowered members of the local partisan, commanded by his son Ercole Cavallaro, to undertake police and search duties. These searches sometimes ended in violence against prominent fascists and agrarians. During one such operation against two landowners, Ercole and two comrades were arrested by the Carabinieri on theft charges.

The mayor worked to obtain his son's release, trigger a revolt. On 5 March 1945, Cavallaro's loyalists freed Ercole, closed the access roads to Caulonia, and occupied the post office, the telegraph office and the Carabinieri barracks. The following day, they hoisted the red flag with hammer and sickle on the bell tower, proclaiming the Republic. The partisan section took care of the armed defense of the territory, women assisted men with provisions, and party cadres had to keep in touch with the party federation. The revolutionaries established a “People's Tribunal,” which was based in the town square and had the power to try “enemies of the people". An internment camp held many agrarians and notables.

The revolutionary experience worried both conservatives and communist leaders, who pressed Cavallaro to calm tempers and end the revolution. The mayor became spokesman for the rebels and convinced most of them to return home and lay down their arms. Diehards refused and went into hiding. Finally, on March 9, the prefect of Reggio Calabria sent departments of carabinieri and police to Caulonia. They arrested 365 men, who were referred to the Locri court for constitution of an armed gang, murder, violence to private individuals and usurpation of public office. On April 15, Cavallaro resigned as mayor.

British historian Jonathan Dunnage reported an "institutional continuity" of the civil servants who survived these regime changes Civil servants were not purged either after 1922 or 1943. The "institutional continuity" of the bureaucracy of Calabria were committed to preserving the social structure. On 2 June 1946 Calabria, like the rest of the Mezzogiorno, voted solidly to retain the monarchy. The traditional political system in Calabria continued after 1945. During the war, the already low living standards of Calabria declined further and the region was notorious as one of Italy's most violent areas.

Attempts by the peasants to take over land were usually resisted by the authorities. On 28 October 1949 in Melissa police opened fire on peasants who had occupied the land of a local baron, killing three men as they attempted to flee. Between 1949 and 1966 another migration wave peaked in 1957 as some 38,090 Calabrians left.

== Italian Republic ==
Southern monarchist Enrico De Nicola became the provisional head of the Italian Republic. On 12 July 1946 De Gasperi formed the second De Gasperi government, becoming the first Prime Minister of the Italian Republic. The governmental structure still rested on agreement between the major anti-fascist parties. Left-wing parties downsized in favor of the Christian Democrats. The Communists and Socialists went from 8 to 6 ministries, whose ministers were Christian Democrats: Sicilian Mario Scelba became Minister of the Interior, Communist Emilio Sereni was Minister of Public Works, while Gullo, Agriculture minister since 1943, became Minister of Justice; his replacement was Antonio Segni (CD), a Sardinian landowner and future President.

=== Land reform ===
Segni's appointment seemed to halt Gullo's agrarian reform drive: between September 1946 and December 1947 issued two decrees that allowed landowners to reclaim unimproved lands. This secured the support of southern elites for the Christian Democrat party, enabling it to win the 18 April 1948 general elections. It increased the tension between the two factions and rekindled laborer occupation of uncultivated land. The Massacre of Melissa, took place in Calabria: on 24 October 1949, some 14,000 peasants from Catanzaro and Cosenza, accompanied by women, children and work animals, occupied the large latifundia and began planting. A group of agrarian Calabrian CD parliamentarians went to Rome, protesting and asking Scelba to use force against the peasants. Scelba sent Mobile Units (mechanized riot police), to Calabria, which stopped at Melissa, in Crotone, finding a large number of protesters on the Fragalà estate, owned by Baron Luigi Berlingeri. The land was supposed to be assigned to the municipality, but the Berlingeri family had usurped it. The peasants claimed at least half of it, but the baron was willing to cede only a third. On 29 October 1949, police, after demanding the crowd of peasants to leave, fired at eye level, wounding 15 wounded and killing 3: Giovanni Zito, Francesco Nigro, and Angelina Mauro. This massacre, combined with that of Portella della Ginestra, in Sicily, which took place on 1 May 1947, provoked strikes and peasant demonstrations throughout Italy.

The unrest induced De Gasperi to pass agrarian reform measures targeting specific territories. On 12 May 1950, the Sila Law was passed, which initially concerned the eastern Sila, and provided for the expropriation of unimproved latifundia exceeding 300 hectares. These clauses allowed agrarians to subdivide the latifundia among relatives or plant improvements on them to avoid expropriation. The subject area was predominantly mountainous and forested, and unsuitable for cultivation. Another agrarian law that covered the whole country was enacted on 21 October 1950. Most Christian Democracy members abstained or voted no. They were supported by conservative members of the US administration.

The reform enacted expropriation, thus making peasants de facto small businessmen independent of the former landowner. This reduced the average size farm size, limiting their development. Peasants responded by forming agricultural cooperatives. By scheduling production and centralizing marketing, they took on an entrepreneurial character. Crop yields improved and the small forms began to prosper.

=== Industrial development ===
Nevertheless, as a result of industrial development, agriculture became a marginal sector. The fourth De Gasperi government established the Cassa per il Mezzogiorno, a public body tasked with financing infrastructural and industrial development to raise the region to match the rest of Italy (Law 646, 10 August 1950). The law's original 10-year term was gradually extended until 1992. It included the A.S.I. plan, which supported the creation of Industrial Development Areas. It provided for the establishment of consortia, promoted by entities such as municipalities, provinces and chambers of commerce for industrial development and basic infrastructure (Law 634, 29 July 1957 “Provvedimenti per il Mezzogiorno”).

In Calabria, for example, important works were the addition of 212 km of the Battipaglia-Reggio Calabria railway line (completed in 1965). However, politicization led to poor quality and corruption (such as financing "entrepreneurs" that later turned out to be shell companies). Procurements and other state initiatives ended up creating useless infrastructure, either because they were unrealistic, or because they remained unfinished: the term "cathedral in the desert" became popular.

The 1950s and 1960s became known as the period of the “economic miracle”: industrial development, economic growth, and an increase in consumption occurred. Italian industry modernized via the adoption of American technological skills and equipment financed by the Marshall Plan. Production in one decade increased by 10%, transforming Italy from a predominantly agricultural country into an industrial one. The major beneficiaries were industrial complexes in northern Italy, which obtained most of the funding. Small and medium-sized enterprises, although they did not receive interventions, also developed, relying on flexibility and adapting to the changing market. New roads and highways sped the movement of people and goods, favoring the use of motor vehicles. This profoundly affected lifestyles.

Under the First Republic, starting in the 1960s, the Italian state attempted to build roads, railroads, ports, etc. The plan failed: infrastructure projects were wildly over-budget and taking far longer to complete then scheduled; for an example, construction started on the A3 highway in 1964 intended to link Reggio Calabria to Salerno, which was as of 2016 still unfinished. The failure to complete the A3 highway after 52 years of effort is regarded as a scandal in Italy, and many parts of Calabria were described as an "industrial graveyard" full of the closed down steel mills and chemical plants that all went bankrupt.

=== Migration ===
Growth and prosperity, however, did not spread evenly, leaving behind some social strata and economic sectors. The agricultural sector continued to face challenges. Between 1951 and 1991, many workers left agriculture. Mechanization reduced the need for workers. Employment fell from 8,261,000 to 1,629,000, and in particular, employment under 30 years of age plummeted from 3,299,000 in 1951 to 341,000 in 1991.

In Calabria after the war, population increased, but jobs did not, leading many to migrate. The Parliamentary Commission for the Study of Misery reported that 179,500 Calabrians (37.7%) lived in a state of misery, the highest%age in Ital, compared to 1.5% in the North, 5.9% in the center and the larger Mezzogiorno (28.3%) and attributed this to the land's unstable hydrogeology, lack of infrastructure, the demanding climate, but mostly unemployment.

In the decade between 1951 and 1961 as many as 400,000 Calabrians migrated, especially to America and Northern Italy, particularly those concentrated in Italy's industrial triangle, where population increased (Turin (+43%) and Milan (+24%). Calabrians also moved from inland areas to coastal centers, again to seek work in construction, urban services, and commerce. Many inland rural areas were abandoned. One e..xample is the medieval village of Badolato Superiore, near Soverato, which became a “metaphor of the abandonment, ruin, flight, and hope of all of Calabria, of the entire Mezzogiorno”.

=== Regional politics ===
Calabrian politics was strained by debates on the regional entity and choice of capital, partly over the implied job opportunities in the public and clerical sectors. In 1963, in the first Moro government, ministers and undersecretaries from Reggio Calabria and Catanzaro were excluded from the executive: the only Calabrians with appointments were Socialist Giacomo Mancini (Minister of Health) and Christian Democrat Riccardo Misasi (Ministries of Grace and Justice), both from Cosenza.

On 21 March 1968, the Reggio Calabria City Council voted on an agenda that advocated for it to become the regional capital. To preserve city interests, the “Agitation Committee for the Defense of Reggio's Interests", headed by Christian Democrat lawyer Francesco Gangemi, was born. However, the 1970 law establishing Italian Regions confirmed the 1949 decision by which the Donatini-Molinaroli report determined that Catanzaro was the capital of the Calabria Region.

This situation affected local and regional elections. Minor secular leftist parties (social democrats and republicans) elected their first representatives, mainly in Reggio and Cosenza. On 5 July 1970 Mayor Pietro Battaglia (CD) spoke in Piazza Duomo in front of 7,000 people. He proclaimed the city's right to be the regional capital. On 12 July, the prodrome of the uprising began in the city, with the creation of roadblocks and public demonstrations. That day, in Villa San Giovanni, Senate President Amintore Fanfani was challenged by the crowd. In retaliation to Fanfani's indifference, the regional deputies from Reggio Calabria (5 Christian Democrats and 1 Socialist), deserted the regional council meeting scheduled for July 13, as opposed to the Communist representatives, who went instead.

=== Reggio revolt ===
The Reggio revolt came on 14 July 1970, supported across social classes (bourgeoisie, clergy, students, political parties, civic committees). Clashes with authorities left one dead (railroad worker Bruno Labate), prompting Archbishop Vincenzo Ferro to join the showdown. The uprising was supported by liberal-conservative newspapers (such as Gazzetta del Sud and Il Tempo). Gradually protest leadership passed from Mayor Battaglia, to more assertive movements, particularly the Movimento Sociale Italiano, seen as least compromised with the republican regime. The Missini authored slogans (famous was the boia chi molla of D'Annunzian memory). Ciccio Franco, a CISNAL trade unionist and Reggio Calabria-based Missini exponent, emerged as the undisputed leader.

Barricades were erected, the railway station was occupied and convoys and ferries to Sicily were blocked. Nineteen days of general strikes, 12 bomb attacks, 32 roadblocks, 14 occupations of the station, 2 of the post office, 1 of the television station, and 4 assaults on the prefecture, The death toll reached 5 on both sides (in addition to Labate, Angelo Campanella, also perished in the clashes, Vincenzo Curigliano, Antonio Bellotti, and Carmelo Jaconis). 426 were arrested and 200 were wounded during police charges (whose members were insulted and vilified even by hospital doctors).

In some parts of the city, “autonomous republics” were proclaimed, such as the “Republic of Sbarre” and the “Grand Duchy of St. Catherine”. The Italian government, presided over by Emilio Colombo after the resignation of Mariano Rumor, appealed to the people of Reggio Emilia to end the violence. Otherwise, it promised the use of force. For the first time in the history of the Italian Republic, the government sent in the army and carabinieri. Even far-left parties, including the Communists and the PSIUP, condemned the uprising, decrying it as parochial and non-proletarian, often clashing with their own voter base.

On 23 February 1971, after 10 months of rioting, the revolt ceased given a compromise with the regional government. The Prime Minister, meeting with the president of the Calabria Region, Antonio Guarasci (CD), and regional politicians of various parties, assembled the Colombo Package, which sought to involve all parties: Catanzaro would be the regional capital, while Reggio would host the regional council; Cosenza would be the site of Calabria's first university (University of Calabria), while Gioia Tauro would become the fifth national steel hub and a chemical factory would be established in Saline Joniche. The agreement was accepted by the populace, but the steel plant was never built, while the chemical plant, although built, ceased production almost immediately due to Ministry of Health provisions that declared the feedstocks it produced to be carcinogenic.

In the 1972 general elections the scales shifted in favor of the right, which won 27% of the vote and became the leading party in Reggio and Ciccio Franco was elected to the Senate. In October, a two-day demonstration in Reggio by some 40,000 northern CGIL metalworkers, supported the revolt.

The Reggio revolt was one of the most controversial periods in the history of Calabria, partly because of the absence of related documentation, which was often destroyed or hidden. Historiography generally reflects the perspective of the author. Examples:

- it reflected complex political and social motivations
- it was not a fascist uprising, although the Italian Social Movement led it (as viewed by leftists, that it was an interclass, inter-party and intergenerational movement, that it was an anti-state uprising (in view of the “autonomous republics”)
- it was spontaneous and without direction, despite Mayor Battaglia's call to strike.

Some studies reported the influence of the 'ndrangheta, colluding with the right (e.g., the Baracca anarchists). Another theory is that the state and secret services were involved and used it to increase tension in the country.

In the 1980s, Calabria remained undeveloped. It was dominated by power groups linked to organized crime and deviant freemasonry. Social and economic initiatives, barely advanced, assuming the availability of human and other resources that did not exist. Many (expensive) works mostly benefited a few entrepreneurs rather than the masses.

The 'Ndrangheta began to make headlines thanks to its ransom kidnappings (such as the one of John Paul Getty III, grandson of J. Paul Getty, onetime world's richest man who was taken in 1973 and released upon payment of a one billion seven hundred million lire ransom). In the 1980s, they turned to narcotics trafficking, forging contacts with South American drug cartels and feuding with Mafia clans for control of territory. As in Sicily, the 'ndrangheta infiltrated the politics, placing its people in municipal administrations. Gioia Tauro harbor, completed in 1985 was conceived as a trading port for the steel plant, was later used as a transit port: from the outset, it was under the control of the Piromalli and Molè clans, who used it to import drugs and counterfeit goods. In the 1990s, in order to quell the murder spree (such as the 1991 murder of Judge Antonino Scopelliti, who was working on the Palermo Maxi Trial), Operation Riace was implemented, bringing the army (1350 personnel) to bear. Other initiatives included “Wall Street,” ‘Count Down,’ ‘Hoca Tuca,’ ‘North-South,’ ‘Belgium,’ and ‘Fine,’ which involved many 'ndrine and ended the Siderno Group, a drug trafficking consortium between Canada and Calabria.

=== Springtime of Reggio ===
In later years increasing volunteerism and participation in public affairs emerged. One example is the 1993 Reggio Calabria mayoral election, won by Italo Falcomatà. He served three terms until his death on 11 December 2001. Falcomatà, at the head of a center-left junta, led the “Springtime of Reggio,” spurring citizens to re-engage with the city, after years of torpor. During his tenure, he succeeded in unlocking funds from the “Reggio Decree” that had languished for years for the redevelopment and development, while he fought illegal construction and downsized the open market, then dominated by organized crime.
