= Sybaris (disambiguation) =

Sybaris may refer to:

- Sybaris, an ancient city of Magna Graecia, now in Italy
  - Sibari, a hamlet of Cassano all'Ionio, Calabria, Italy
- Sybaris on the Traeis, a nearby ancient city founded by refugees from the above
- Sybaris, a blister beetle genus
- an alternate name for the Coscile, a river of Italy adjacent to Magna Græcia
- Sybaris (mythology), a man-eating beast of Greek mythology.
- Sybaris is a companion of Aeneas slain by Turnus in Book 12 (XII line 362) of the Aeneid

== See also ==
- Sybarite (disambiguation)
- Sybris
