= Trionto =

Trionto Traeis
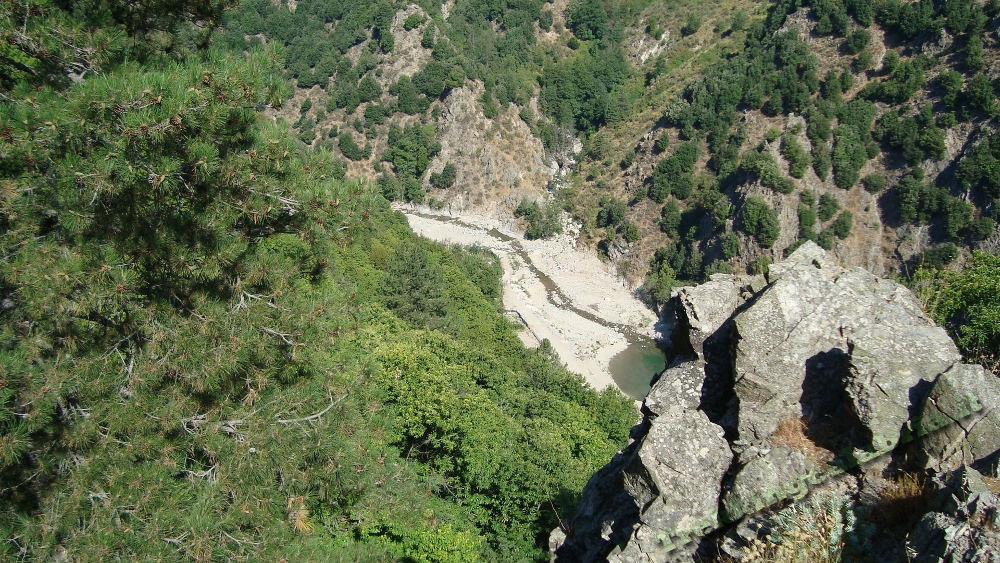
- The Trionto between Acri and Longobucco

Location
- Country: Italy
- Region: Calabria
- Cities: Longobucco, Cropalati, Crosia

Physical characteristics
- Source
  - location: Sila Mountains
- Mouth: Gulf of Taranto
  - location: Pantano Martucci
  - coordinates: 39°37′29″N 16°45′25″E
  - elevation: 0 m (0 ft)
- Length: 40 km (25 mi)
- Basin size: 288 km^{2} (111 sq mi)
- Discharge
  - average: 4.4 m^{3}/s (160 cu ft/s)

The Trionto is a river in the Calabria region of southern Italy. It was known in ancient times as the Traeis. It rises in the Sila Mountains and initially flows to the east but gradually changes direction to the north. It drains into the Gulf of Taranto at Pantano Martucci after a course of about 40 kilometers. Its main tributaries are the La Manna, Macrocioli, Ortiano and Laurenzana. It has a drainage basin of 288 square kilometres (111 sq mi). Along its course it passes Longobucco, Cropalati and Crosia. The river is mainly seasonal. The ancient Greek city Sybaris on the Traeis was located near the course of the river, but its location has not been found.
