= Lampon =

Lampon (Ancient Greek: Λάμπων) was an Athenian soothsayer and interpreter of dreams and oracles. Together with Xenocritus he founded the colony of Thurii in Italy at 444 BC or 443 BC. He was called "the expounder" (ἐξηγητὴς), responsible for interpreting omens, prescribing rituals, and overseeing the religious aspects of the city's foundation. His father most probably was Olympiodorus. Diodorus Siculus wrote about how the colony has been established.

The term "Thurii-seers" (Thouriomanteis; Θουριομάντεις) referred not to seers from Thurii itself, but to seers such as Lampon who were sent by Athens to assist in founding the colony.

Cratinus satirized him in his comedy Δραπετίδες. Aristophanes also mentions him. Plutarch has a story of his foretelling the ascendancy of Pericles over Thucydides and his party.
