= Thurii =

City of Magna Graecia, situated on the Tarentine gulf

- Θούρῐοι (Thoúrioi)
- Θούρῐον (Thoúrion), Thurium, Copia, Copiae
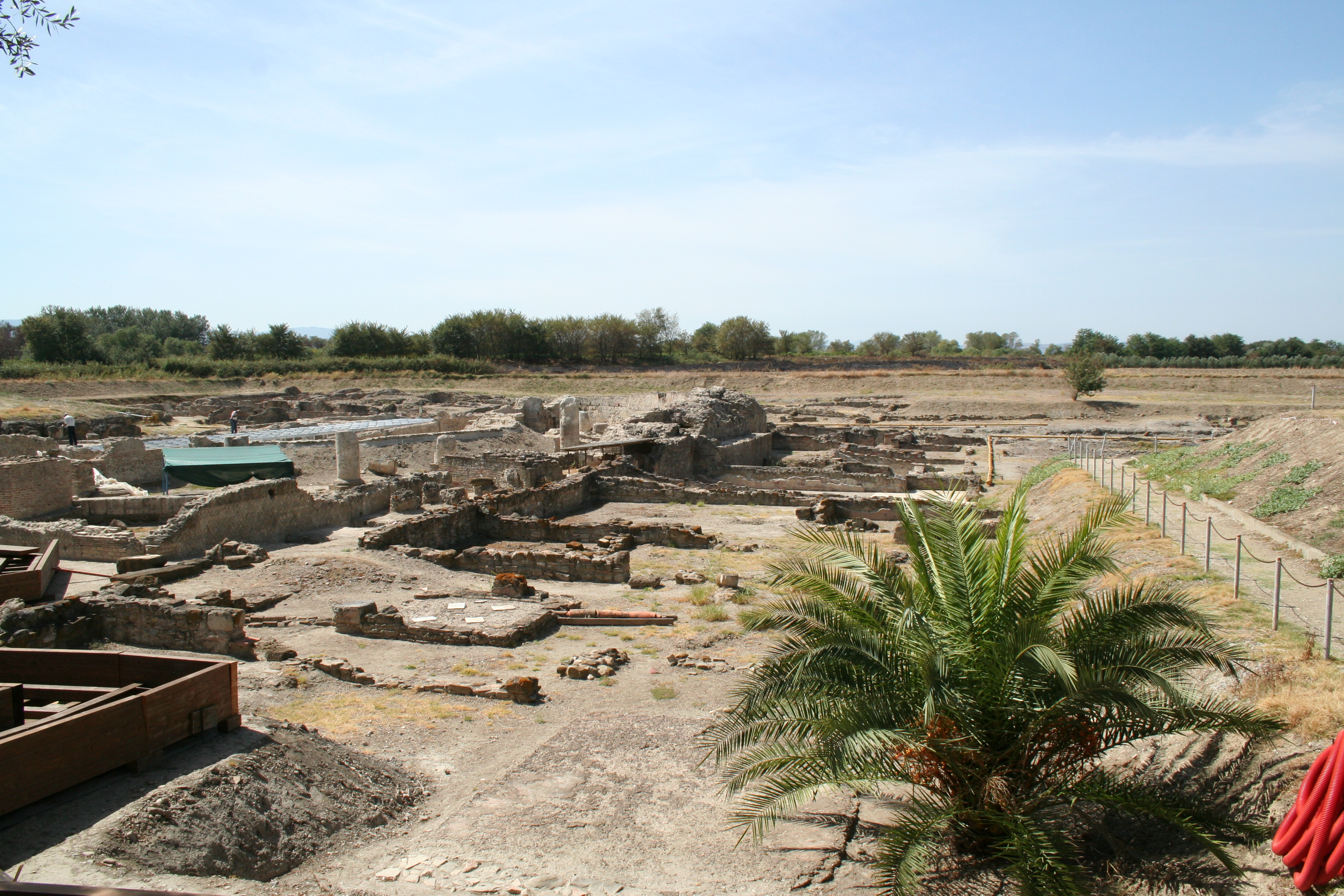
- Overview of excavated ruins, possibly from Thurii

- Location within Italy
- 39°43′2″N 16°29′44″E
- Type: Settlement
- Location: Sibari, Province of Cosenza, Calabria, Italy
- Region: Bruttium

Site notes
- Website: ArcheoCalabriaVirtual (in Italian)

Thurii (/ˈθʊəriaɪ/; Latin: Thūriī; Ancient Greek: Θούρῐοι, romanized: Thoúrioi), called also by some Latin writers Thūrium (compare Ancient Greek: Θούρῐον, romanized: Thoúrion, in Ptolemy), and later in Roman times also Cōpia and Cōpiae, was an ancient Greek city situated on the Gulf of Taranto, near or on the site of the great renowned city of Sybaris, whose place it may be considered as having taken. It was notable for being the place of exile of the great historian of the Persian Wars, Herodotus.

The ruins of the city can be found in the Sybaris archaeological park near Sibari in the Province of Cosenza, Calabria, Italy.

== History ==
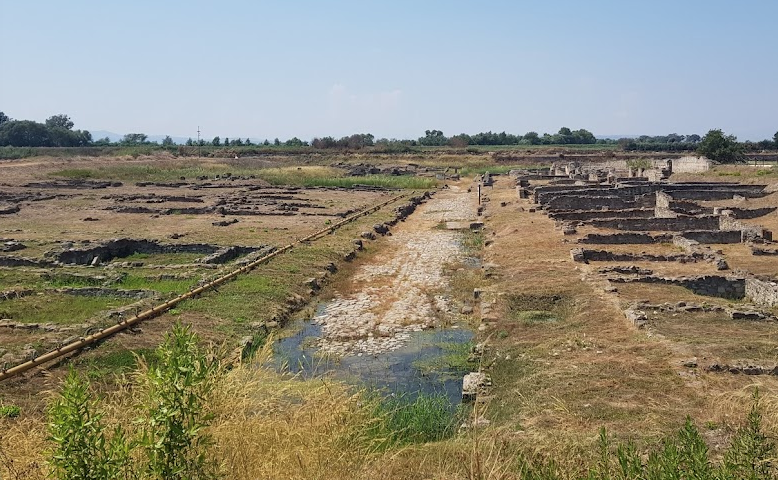
main street of Thurii.

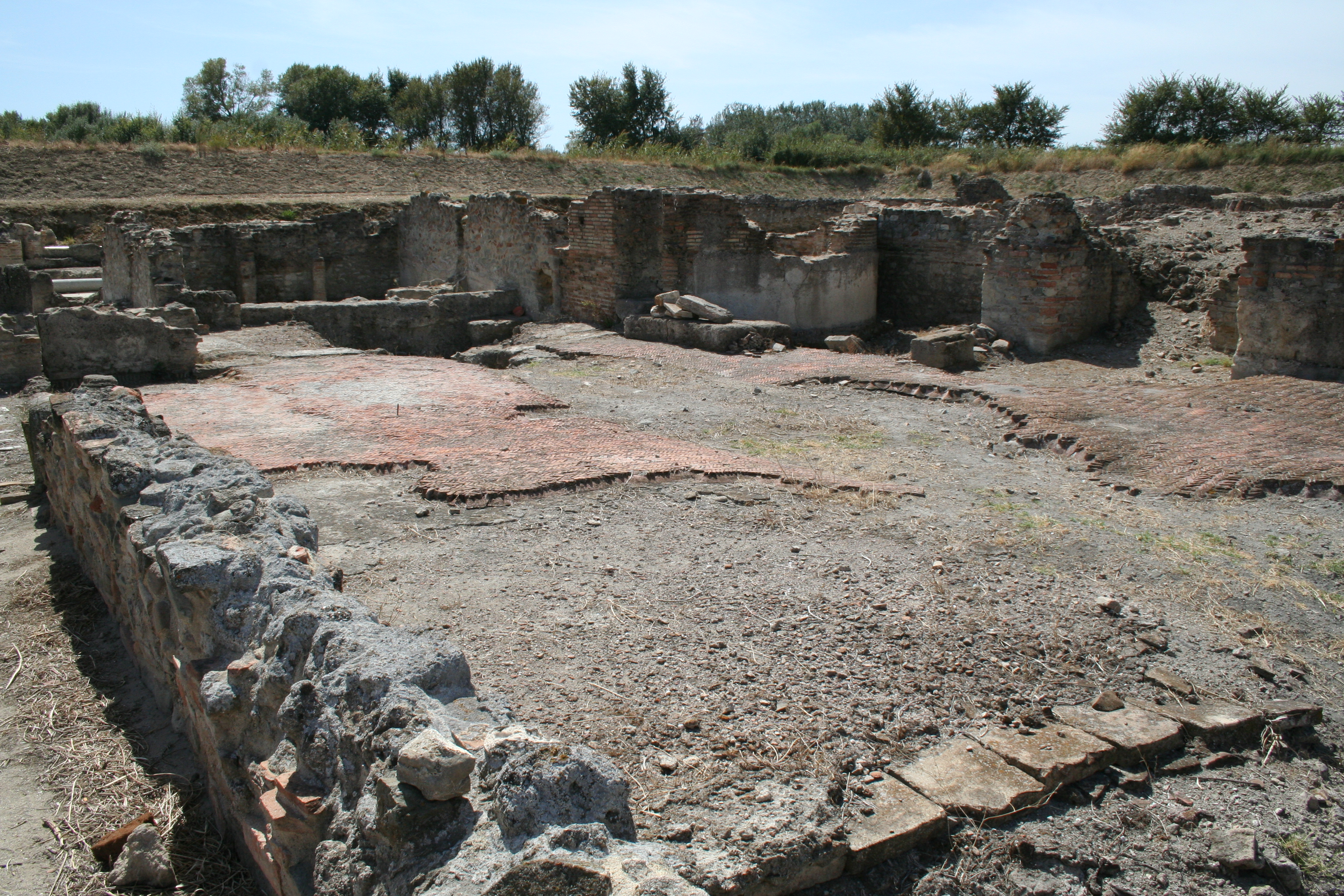
Excavated remains of buildings, possibly from Thurii.

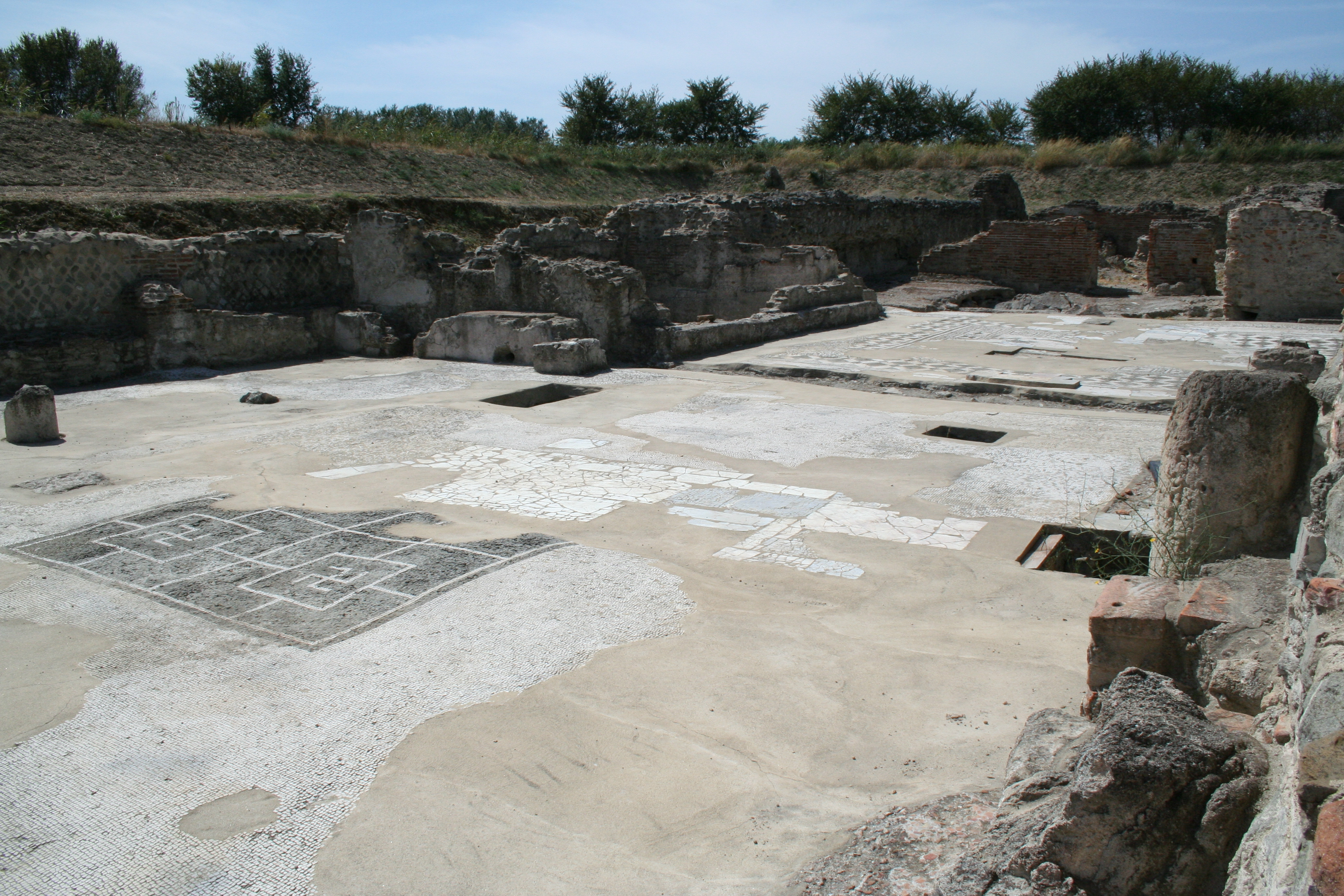
Excavated mosaic floor with swastikas, possibly from Thurii.

=== Foundation ===
Thurii was founded as a colony of Athens along with exiles from Sybaris in 443 BC. Justin writes that people say that the city of Thurii was built by Philoctetes and his monument is seen there even to his days, as well as the arrows of Hercules which laid up in the temple of Apollo. The site of that city had remained desolate for a period of 58 years after its destruction by the Crotoniats; when at length, in 452 BC, a number of the Sybarite exiles and their descendants made an attempt to establish themselves again on the spot, under the guidance of some leaders of Thessalian origin; and the new colony rose so rapidly to prosperity that it excited the jealousy of the Crotoniats, who, in consequence, expelled the new settlers a little more than 5 years after the establishment of the colony. The fugitive Sybarites first appealed for support to Sparta, but without success: their application to the Athenians was more successful, and that people determined to send out a fresh colony, at the same time that they reinstated the settlers who had been lately expelled from thence. A body of Athenian colonists was accordingly sent out by Pericles, under the command of Lampon and Xenocritus. Pericles' expressed intent was for it to be a Panhellenic colony, and the number of Athenian citizens was small, the greater part of those who took part in the colony being collected from various parts of Greece. Among them were two celebrated names: Herodotus the historian, and the orator Lysias, both of whom appear to have formed part of the original colony. Hippodamus also went out with the colonists and became the architect of the new city. The term "Thurii-seers" (Thouriomanteis; Θουριομάντεις) referred not to seers from Thurii itself, but to seers such as Lampon who were sent by Athens to assist in founding the colony.

The laws of the new colony were established by the sophist Protagoras at the request of Pericles, adopting the laws of Zaleucus of Locri.

The new colonists at first established themselves on the site of the deserted Sybaris, but shortly afterwards removed (apparently in obedience to an oracle) to a spot at a short distance from thence, where there was a fountain named "Thuria", from whence the new city derived its name of Thurii. The foundation of Thurii is assigned by Diodorus to the year 446 BC; but other authorities place it three years later, 443 BC, and this seems to be the best authenticated date. The protection of the Athenian name probably secured the rising colony from the assaults of the Crotoniats, at least nothing is heard of any obstacles to its progress from that quarter; but it was early disturbed by dissensions between the descendants of the original Sybarite settlers and the new colonists, the former laying claim not only to honorary distinctions, but to the exclusive possession of important political privileges. These disputes at length ended in a revolution, and the Sybarites were finally expelled from the city. They established themselves for a short time in Sybaris on the Traeis but did not maintain their footing long, being dislodged and finally dispersed by the neighboring barbarians. The Thurians meanwhile concluded a treaty of peace with Crotona, and the new city rose rapidly to prosperity. Fresh colonists poured in from all quarters, especially the Peloponnese; and though it continued to be generally regarded as an Athenian colony, the Athenians in fact formed but a small element of the population. The citizens were divided, as we learn from Diodorus, into ten tribes, the names of which sufficiently indicate their origin. They were: the Arcadian (from Arcadia), Achaean (from Achaea), Elean (from Elea), Boeotian (from Boeotia), Amphictyonic (from Amphictyonis), Dorian (from Doris), Ionian (from Ionia), Athenian (from Athens), Euboean (from Euboea), and Nesiotic (from the islands). The form of government was democratic, and the city is said to have enjoyed the advantage of a well-ordered system of laws; but the statement of Diodorus, who represents this as owing to the legislation of Charondas, and that lawgiver himself as a citizen of Thurii, is certainly erroneous. The city itself was laid out with great regularity, being divided by four broad streets or plateae, each of which was crossed in like manner by three others.

=== War and conflict ===
Very shortly after its foundation, Thurii became involved in a war with Tarentum (modern Taranto). The subject of this was the possession of the fertile district of the Siritis, about 50 km north of Thurii, to which the Athenians had a claim of long standing, which was naturally taken up by their colonists. The Spartan general, Cleandridas, who had been banished from Greece some years before, and taken up his abode at Thurii, became the general of the Thurians in this war, which, after various successes, was at length terminated by a compromise, both parties agreeing to the foundation of the new colony of Heracleia in the disputed territory.

Knowledge of the history of Thurii is very scanty and fragmentary. Fresh disputes arising between the Athenian citizens and the other colonists were at length allayed by the oracle of Delphi, which decided that the city had no other founder than Apollo. But the same difference appears again on occasion of the great Athenian expedition to Sicily, when the city was divided into two parties, the one desirous of favoring and supporting the Athenians, the other opposed to them. The latter faction at first prevailed, so far that the Thurians observed the same neutrality towards the Athenian fleet under Nicias and Alcibiades as the other cities of Italy. Thurii was, in fact, the city where Alcibiades escaped his Athenian captors who were taking him home for trial.

But two years afterwards (413 BC) the Athenian party had regained the ascendency; and when Demosthenes and Eurymedon touched at Thurii, the citizens afforded them every assistance, and even furnished an auxiliary force of 700 hoplites and 300 dartmen. From this time we hear nothing of Thurii for a period of more than 20 years, though there is reason to believe that this was just the time of its greatest prosperity. In 390 BC we find that its territory was already beginning to suffer from the incursions of the Lucanians, a new and formidable enemy, for protection against whom all the cities of Magna Graecia had entered into a defensive league. But the Thurians were too impatient to wait for the support of their allies, and issued forth with an army of 14,000 foot and 1000 horse, with which they repulsed the attacks of the Lucanians; but having rashly followed them into their own territory, they were totally defeated, near Laüs, and above 10,000 of them cut to pieces.

This defeat must have inflicted a severe blow on the prosperity of Thurii, while the continually increasing power of the Lucanians and Bruttians in their immediate neighbourhood would prevent them from quickly recovering from its effects. The city continued also to be on hostile, or at least unfriendly, terms with Dionysius of Syracuse, and was in consequence chosen as a place of retirement or exile by his brother Leptines and his friend Philistus. The rise of the Bruttian people about 356 BC probably became the cause of the complete decline of Thurii, but the statement of Diodorus that the city was conquered by that people must be received with considerable doubt.

It reappears in history at a later period, when Corinthian soldiers en route to join Timoleon on his expedition to Syracuse are blockaded there by Carthaginian ships. At this point it was still an independent Greek city, though much fallen from its former greatness. No mention of it is found during the wars of Alexander of Epirus in this part of Italy.

Later it was so hard pressed by the Lucanians that it had recourse to alliance with Rome and a Roman army was sent to its relief under Gaius Fabricius Luscinus in 282 BC. He defeated the Lucanians and Bruttians, who had laid siege to the city, in a pitched battle and several other successes broke their power, and thus relieved the Thurians from all immediate danger from that quarter. But shortly after they were attacked on the other side by the Tarentines, who are said to have taken and plundered their city; and this aggression was one of the immediate causes of the war declared by the Romans against Tarentum in 282 BC.

=== Roman dependency ===
Thurii became a dependent ally of Rome, and was protected by a Roman garrison.

It played a considerable part in the Second Punic War with Hannibal. It was one of the cities which defected to the Carthaginians after the battle of Cannae in 212 BC. After the defection of Tarentum, they betrayed the Roman troops into the hands of the Carthaginian general Hanno. A few years later (210 BC), Hannibal, finding himself unable to protect his allies in Campania, removed the inhabitants of Atella who had survived the fall of their city to Thurii; but it was not long before he was compelled to abandon the latter city also to its fate. When he himself in 204 BC withdrew his forces into Bruttium, he removed to Crotona 3500 of the principal citizens of Thurii, while he gave up the city itself to the plunder of his troops.

It is evident that Thurii was now sunk to the lowest state of decay, but the great fertility of its territory rendered it desirable to preserve it from utter desolation. Hence in 194 BC, it was one of the places selected for the establishment of a Roman colony with Latin rights. The number of colonists was small in proportion to the extent of land to be divided among them, but they amounted to 3000 foot and 300 knights. Livy says merely that the colony was sent in Thurinum agrum, but Strabo tells us that the Romans gave the new colony the name of Copiae, as confirmed both by Stephanus of Byzantium and by the evidence of coins, on which, however, the name is written "COPIA". But this new name did not continue long in use, and Thurii still continued to be known by its ancient appellation. It is mentioned as a municipal town on several occasions during the latter ages of the Roman Republic. In 72 BC it was taken by Spartacus and subjected to heavy contributions but not otherwise injured. According to Suetonius, the Octavian family held some renown there, and Gaius Octavius (father of the future Caesar Augustus) defeated a Spartacist army near there. As a result, the future emperor was granted the surname Thurinus shortly after birth. At the outbreak of the Civil Wars, it was deemed by Julius Caesar of sufficient importance to be secured with a garrison of Gaulish and Spanish horse, and it was there that M. Caelius Rufus was put to death, after a vain attempt to excite an insurrection in this part of Italy. In 40 BC also it was attacked by Sextus Pompeius, who laid waste its territory, but he was repulsed from the walls of the city.

Thurii was at this time still a place of some importance, and it is mentioned as an existing town by Pliny and Ptolemy, as well as Strabo. It was probably, indeed, the only place of any consideration remaining on the coast of the Tarentine gulf between Crotona and Tarentum; both Metapontum and Heracleia having already fallen into almost complete decay. Its name is still found in the Itineraries, and it is noticed by Procopius as still existing in the 6th century.

=== Abandonment ===
Over time, the sediment accretion of the Crathis river caused its river delta to shift towards the sea at a long term rate of one metre a year. As a consequence the successive sites of Sybaris, Thurii, and Copia became landlocked and lost their importance because they no longer had easy access to the sea for trade. It seems to have been abandoned during the Middle Ages when the inhabitants took refuge at a place called Terranova (Terranova da Sibari), about 15 km inland, on a hill on the left bank of the Crathis.

The exact location of Greek Thurii is not confirmed but that of the Roman town, which probably occupied the same site, is fixed by several ruins as being about 6 km to the east of Terranova da Sibari and as occupying an area some 6 km in circuit. It is clear from the statements of Diodorus and Strabo that Thurii occupied a site near to, but distinct from, that of Sybaris. It is more likely that the true site is north of the Coscile (the ancient Sybaris), a few kilometres from the sea, where ruins still exist. Roman ruins on the peninsula formed by the rivers Crathis and Sybaris may also perhaps be those of Thurii.

== The site ==
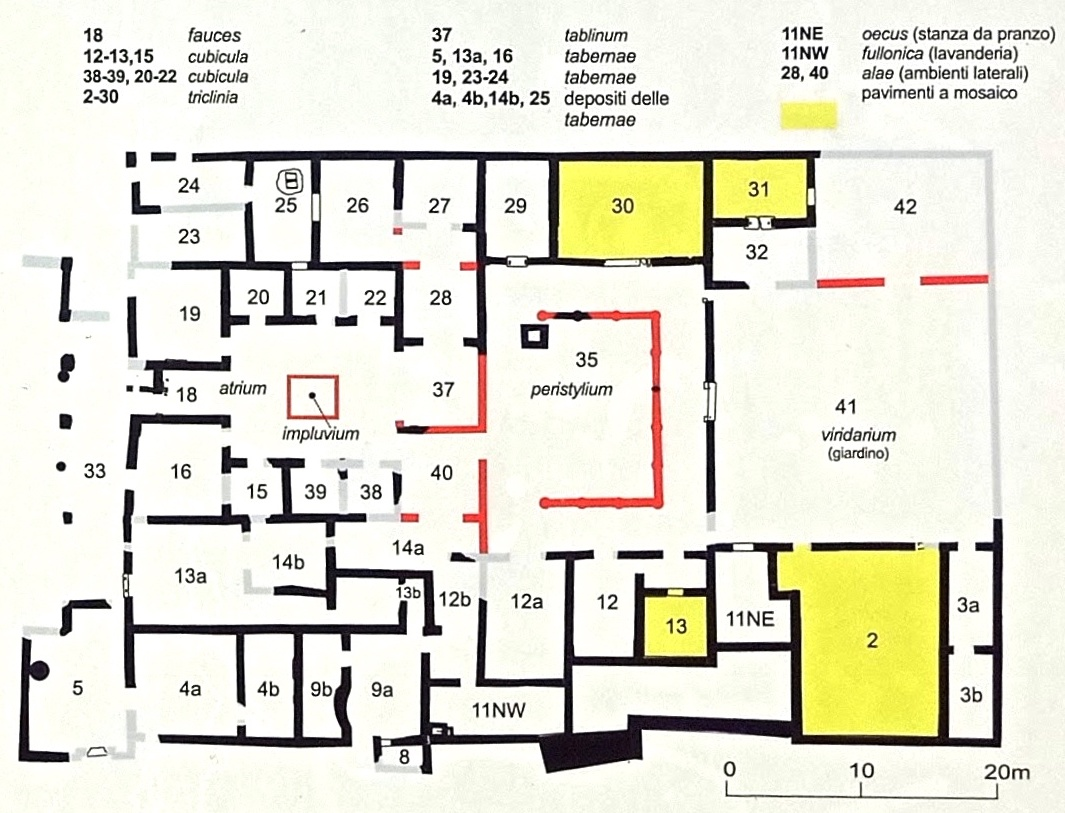
Domus of Thurii in final phase (3rd c. AD).

One house stands out by size and decoration: the large domus located behind the Theatre, undoubtedly one of the most sumptuous private buildings in the Roman city. It was built in the late Republican era (1st century BC) and survived until the 5th century AD through a series of expansions and transformations that gradually modified the layout. The monumentality and the splendour of the house reached their peak between the 1st and 3rd centuries AD while from the 4th are tangible signs of a decline.

== Coinage ==
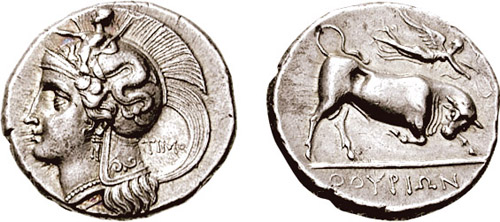

First side of the image: O: helmeted head of Athena left, wearing Attic helmet decorated with Skylla holding a rudder, neck guard decorated with a palmette. TIMO
Second side of the image: R: bull butting right; above, Nike flying right, crowning bull. ΘΟΥΡΙΩΝ
AR Stater (7.98 g, 6h) Lucania, Thourioi ~350-300 BC

Thurii had an active mint in antiquity. The coins of Thurii are of great beauty; their number and variety indeed gives us a higher idea of the opulence and prosperity of the city than we should gather from the statements of ancient writers.

== Famous people ==
- Alexis (ancient comic poet)
- Herodotus, who migrated to Thurii from Athens after 443 BC.
- Lysias, who migrated to Thurii from Athens c. 430 BC.

== See also ==
- List of ancient Greek cities
