= Sybarite =

In general parlance, "sybarite" is a term used for someone who embraces a lifestyle of excessive pleasure-seeking and self-indulgence; i.e., a libertine or a decadent. Sybarite may also refer to:

- A native of Sybaris, an ancient Greek city in southern Italy. In antiquity, Achaean Greeks stereotypically associated Sybaris with libertinism and excess, hence the modern term.
- Sybarite (musician), New York electronic musician
- Sybarite, a pseudonym of Skein (character) from Marvel Comics
