= Cropalati =

Cropalati Greek: Kuropalátis
- Comune
- Comune di Cropalati
- Location within Italy Location within Calabria
- Coordinates: 39°31′N 16°43′E
- Country: Italy
- Region: Calabria
- Province: Cosenza (CS)

Government
  - Mayor: Luigi Lettieri

Area
  - Total: 33.7 km^{2} (13.0 sq mi)
- Elevation: 384 m (1,260 ft)

Population (2018-01-01)
  - Total: 1,263
  - Density: 37.5/km^{2} (97.1/sq mi)
- Demonym: Cropalatesi
- Time zone: UTC+1 (CET)
  - Summer (DST): UTC+2 (CEST)
- Postal code: 87060
- Dialing code: 0983
- Website: Official website

Cropalati is a town and comune in the province of Cosenza in the Calabria region of southern Italy.
