= Mètauros =

Metauros
- Metauros (Greek)
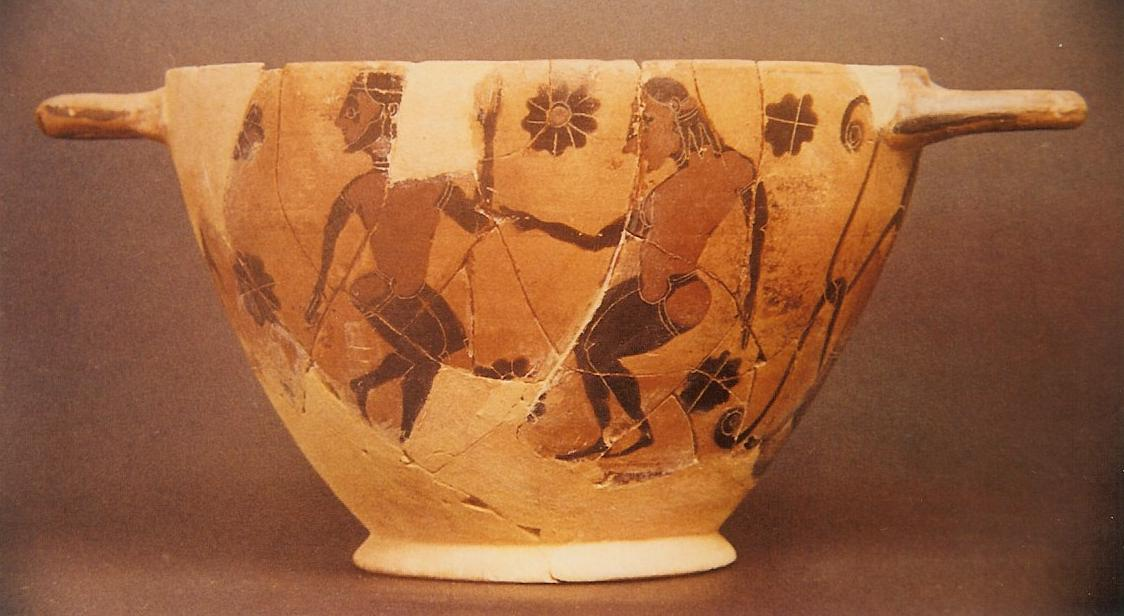
- Interactive map of Metauros
- Location: Gioia Tauro, Metropolitan City of Reggio Calabria, Italy

Metauros (also known as Metauria, in ancient Greek: Μέταυρος, and in Latin: Matauros) was an ancient city of Magna Graecia, located on the right bank of the Metauro River (modern-day Petrace) in what is now the town of Gioia Tauro, Calabria, Italy. Founded in the 7th century BC by settlers from Zancle (present-day Messina), Metauros was a thriving colony of Magna Graecia, quickly becoming a significant commercial and cultural hub in the region.

== History ==
The origins of Metauros have been debated among scholars. Some theories suggest that the city may have been a sub-colony of Zancle (modern Messina), or a joint venture between Rhegion (modern Reggio Calabria) and Zancle, later falling under Locrian influence. Another theory proposes that Metauros was directly founded by settlers from Locri.

During its time as part of Magna Graecia, Metauros played a significant role in trade, culture, and artisanal production. Greek settlers imported fine goods like bronzes, ceramics, and textiles from Athens and exchanged them for local products such as grain. Thanks to its strategic location along important maritime routes, Metauros thrived as a bustling center of commerce.

In the 5th century BCE, Metauros became part of the larger network of Greek cities in the region. The city's prosperity was linked to its position within a cohesive Greek community along the Tyrrhenian coast, marked by strong cultural and economic exchanges. Despite this, the city faced incursions from Italic tribes like the Lucanians and Bruttians, which gradually threatened its stability.

Archaeological excavations have uncovered evidence of Metauros’ rich cultural life, including necropolises with burials from the Hellenistic and Roman periods. Artifacts such as amphorae, lamps, and various vases, including some of Etruscan and Punic origin, provide insight into the city's far-reaching trade connections.

In 386 BCE, Dionysius I of Syracuse conquered Rhegion as retaliation for an insult when its citizens refused his marriage proposal. Dionysius then allied with Locri and the Lucanians, conquering the entire Bruttian area, although Metauros itself was spared destruction.

Romanization of the region between 445 and 400 BCE led to repeated invasions by the Bruzii and Bretti, but in the 3rd century BCE, Roman intervention in Southern Italy marked the beginning of a new era for Metauros. When Rome began consolidating its power, it established garrisons in Metauria, Reggio, and other important cities of the region.

By 189 CE, an epidemic drove much of Metauros’ population to migrate toward Taurianum (modern Taureana di Palmi), leading to the eventual abandonment of the city. The decline continued due to successive waves of pestilence and invasions, leaving the once-thriving settlement largely uninhabited.

By the early Middle Ages, incursions by barbarian tribes like the Visigoths and Saracens further sealed Metauros’ fate. The region experienced instability until the Norman and later Pisan interventions helped stabilize Southern Italy, ending the cycle of invasions. The inhabitants moved inland, establishing new settlements such as Taurianova.

Ultimately, the combination of epidemics, migrations, and barbarian raids led to the city's near disappearance by the 2nd century CE, reducing Metauros to ruins.

== Archeology ==
The archaeological remains of ancient Metauros are housed in several prestigious institutions. Many artifacts, including pottery, tools, and sculptures, are displayed at the Museo Archeologico di Metauros, which offers insights into the city's history. Additionally, significant findings from Metauros, such as ceramics and bronzes, are preserved at the Museo Archeologico Nazionale di Reggio Calabria, known for its comprehensive collection of Magna Graecia relics. A select few items from Metauros have also reached international audiences, with pieces exhibited at the Metropolitan Museum of Art in New York, showcasing the city's far-reaching influence.
