= Crosia =

- Comune
- Comune di Crosia
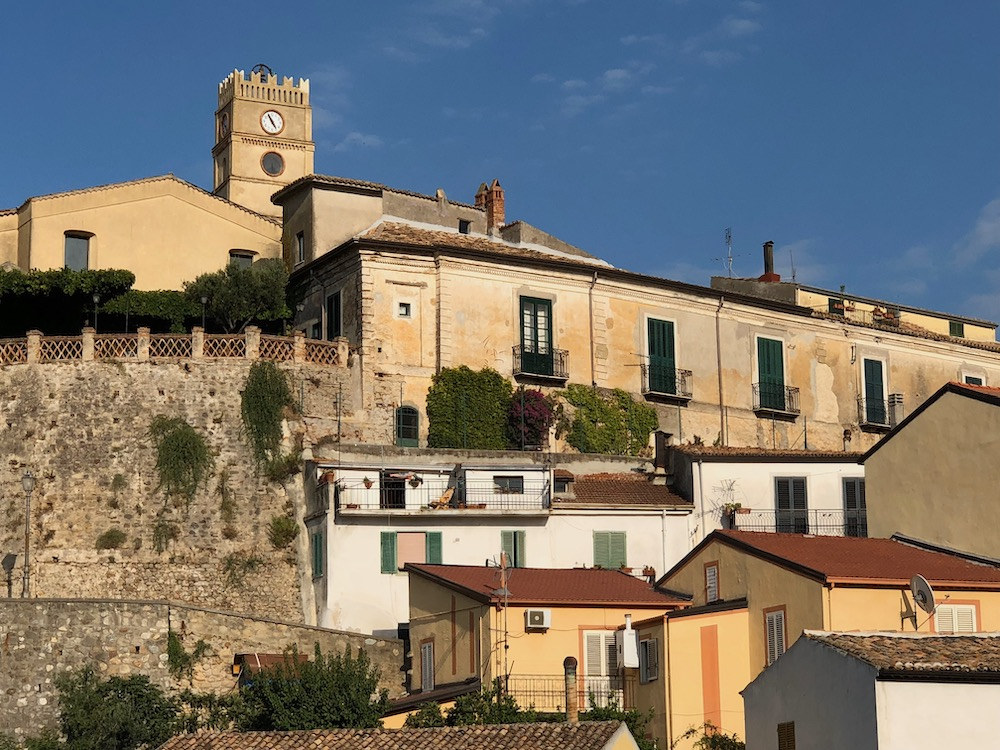

- Location within Italy Location within Calabria
- Coordinates: 39°34′N 16°46′E
- Country: Italy
- Region: Calabria
- Province: Cosenza (CS)
- Frazioni: Mirto, Fiumarella, Sorrenti, Pantano

Government
  - Mayor: Maria Teresa Aiello

Area
  - Total: 21.43 km^{2} (8.27 sq mi)
- Elevation: 230 m (750 ft)

Population (31 December 2004)
  - Total: 8,655
  - Density: 403.9/km^{2} (1,046/sq mi)
- Demonym: Crosioti
- Time zone: UTC+1 (CET)
  - Summer (DST): UTC+2 (CEST)
- Postal code: 87060
- Dialing code: 0983
- Patron saint: Saint Michael the Archangel
- Website: www.comunedicrosia.it

Crosia (Calabrian: Crusìa) is a town and comune in the province of Cosenza in the Calabria region of southern Italy.
