= Sybaris on the Traeis =

Ancient Greek city

Sybaris on the Traeis was an ancient city situated on the Traeis river, now known as the Trionto. It shares its name with the original city of Sybaris (Ancient Greek: Σύβαρις) which was destroyed in 510 BC. Its former inhabitants built a new city, Thurii, not far from the site of Sybaris. This new colony was founded together with other Greek settlers in 446/445 BC. Soon a conflict arose between the two groups and most of the Sybarites were killed by the other Greek colonists of Thurii. The Sybarites who managed to flee then founded Sybaris on the Traeis a short time after 444 BC. The city was destroyed by the Bruttii not long after their emergence as an ethnic group in 356/355 BC.

In the present day the Trionto river flows through the Province of Cosenza in Calabria, Italy. The mouth of the river lies approximately 25 kilometers southeast of the site of Thurii. The exact location of Sybaris on the Traeis has not been found along the course of the Trionto yet.

== History ==
=== Foundation ===
Diodorus Siculus relates how the Sybarites, whose city had been destroyed by Croton, were assisted by other Greeks in founding Thurii in 446/445 BC. Soon a conflict broke out between the Sybarites and the other colonists over their privileges. According to Diodorus, the Sybarites had assigned the most important offices to themselves, had their wives sacrifice to the gods the first and took the land which lay the closest to the city. Being more numerous and powerful, the other colonists killed many of the Sybarites. Some of them managed to flee and founded Sybaris on the Traeis. John Wonder dates the founding of the city to have taken place shortly after 444 BC.

Strabo also mentions Sybaris on the Traeis, stating that some people thought it was of Rhodian origin. Frank Walbank argues that this idea was probably a mistake not endorsed by Strabo himself.

=== Two alliances ===
Polybius writes that Sybaris was allied with two other Achaean colonies, Croton and Caulonia. Walbank thinks it very likely that Polybius meant Sybaris on the Traeis. Wonder agrees, noting that the original Sybarites would have been hostile to Croton and would not have formed an alliance with that city.

Wonder argues the cities formed this alliance in the second half of the 5th century BC because they felt threatened by neighboring Greek city-states in Southern Italy. In spite of Croton's destruction of the original Sybaris, an alliance would have been mutually beneficial to the former enemies. The establishment of Thurii and its expansionist policy now threatened both cities. Sybaris on the Traeis probably would have been small and not powerful enough to threaten Croton. It could have functioned as a buffer against Thurii for Croton. In turn, the city could benefit from Croton's protection.

In the early fourth century BC the situation drastically changed when Dionysius I of Syracuse and the Lucanians threatened the Greek cities of Southern Italy. With the exception of Locri, which was an ally of Dionysius, the cities formed an alliance called the Italiote League in 393 BC. Wonder thinks Sybaris on the Traeis probably was a member of the league together with Croton, Caulonia, Thurii, Rhegium and Velia by 389 BC.

=== Destruction ===
Diodorus Siculus writes that Sybaris on the Traeis was eventually destroyed by the Bruttii, but does not give a specific date. Because he dates the formation of the Bruttii as an ethnic group to 356/355 BC the city could not have been destroyed before that date.
