= Marr (surname) =

Marr is a habitational surname that originates from Marr in Aberdeenshire, Scotland, and from Marr in South Yorkshire, England. Marr also derives from the German name Marro. Variant spellings include Mar and Marre. Notable people with this surname include:

- Alec Marr (fl. 1997—2010), Australian environmentalist who served as executive director of the Wilderness Society
- Alem Marr (1787–1843), American-born Jacksonian member of the United States House of Representatives from Pennsylvania
- Alfred Marr (1862–1940), Australian cricketer
- Alison Marr (born 1980), American mathematician and mathematics educator
- Andrew Marr (born 1959), Scottish journalist and political commentator
- Barbara La Marr (1896–1926), American actress, cabaret artist and writer
- Carl von Marr (1858–1936), American painter
- Lefty Marr (1862–1912), American professional baseball player
- Sir Charles Marr (1880–1960), Australian politician
- Chris Marr (fl. 1986–2011), American state senator from Spokane, Washington
- David Marr (neuroscientist) (1945–1980), British neuroscientist
- David Marr (journalist) (born 1947), Australian journalist and biographer
- David G. Marr (born 1937), American historian
- Dave Marr (1933–1997), golfer and sportscaster
- David Marr Walker (1835–1920), Canadian lawyer, judge and political figure in Manitoba
- Don H. Marr, American artist
- Dora Maar (1907–1997), French photographer, painter, and poet
- Runt Marr (1891–1981), American baseball figure
- David G. Marr (born 1937), American/Australian historian specializing in the modern history of Vietnam
- Frances Harrison Marr (1835–1918), American poet
- George Marr Flemington Gillon, MBE (born 1942), English councilman of the City of London Corporation
- George Washington Lent Marr (1779–1856), American politician
- Hank Marr (1927–2004), American jazz musician
- Hans Marr (1878–1949), German actor
- Hans Marr (ski jumper) (1914–1942), German ski jumper
- Jack Marr (1928–2002), Australian rules footballer
- James Marr Brydone (1779–1866), Scottish surgeon
- James Marr (biologist) (1902–1965), Scottish marine biologist and polar explorer
- James Marr (author) (1918–2009), historian of Guernsey
- Jason Marr (born 1989), Scottish professional football player in the role of defender
- James William Slessor Marr (1902–1965), Scottish marine biologist and explorer
- Jerzy Marr (1901–1962), Polish film actor
- Jim Marr, the former bass guitarist of the 1980s British pop/rock band Skin Games
- Jodi Marr, American songwriter and producer
- Joe Marr (1880–?), Australian rules footballer
- John Quincy Marr (1825–1861), American Civil War soldier
- Johnny Marr (born 1963), English guitarist, keyboardist and singer. Former member of Modest Mouse and The Smiths
- Leon Marr (1948–2019), Canadian film and television director and screenwriter
- Leslie Marr, 2nd Baronet (1922–2021), British landscape artist, painter and former racing driver
- Linsey Marr, American scientist
- Logan Marr (1995–2001), American murder victim
- Marr Phillips (1857–1928), American professional baseball player
- Melissa Marr (born 1972), American author
- Natalie Marr, Australian politician
- Nikolai Marr (1865–1934), Georgian historian and linguist
- Nile Marr (born 1992), English musician
- Phebe Marr (born 1931), American historian of modern Iraq with the Middle East Institute
- Reginald Joseph Marr, DFC, OAM, QC (1917–1999), Australian lawyer and military officer
- Reuben Marr (1884–1961), English professional association football player
- Robert Marr, English professional footballer who played as an inside forward
- Robert Hardin Marr (1819–1892), Louisiana Supreme Court Justice
- Ruairidh Erskine of Marr (1869–1960), Scottish nationalist and aristocrat
- Sally Marr (1906–1997), American stand-up comic, dancer, actress and talent spotter
- Scott Marr, American lacrosse coach
- Souk El Marr, one of the Souks of Tunis
- Thomas Marr (1866–1936), American architect
- Tom Marr (1942–2016), American talk radio host on WCBM in Baltimore
- Walter Lorenzo Marr (1865–1941), American automotive engineer
- Wilhelm Marr (1819–1904), German agitator and publicist
- William Marr (馬為義; born 1936), American retired engineering researcher and poet
- Zoë Coombs Marr, Australian comedian, performer and actor
- Carl von Marr (1858–1936), American-born German painter

== Characters ==
- Kila Marr, a Star Trek character
- Visas Marr, a Star Wars character

== See also ==
- Bill Marr (disambiguation)
- David Marr (disambiguation)
- John Marr (disambiguation)
- Marra (surname)
- Marre (surname)
