= Mar =

Mar, mar or MAR may refer to:

== Culture ==
- Mar (title), or Mor, an honorific in Syriac
- Earl of Mar, an earldom in Scotland
- Mar., an abbreviation for March, the third month of the year in the Gregorian calendar
- Biblical abbreviation for the Gospel of Mark

== Places ==
- Mar (Scottish province), now known as Marr, a region of Aberdeenshire
- Mesoamerican region, an economic region
- Mar, Isfahan, a village in Iran
- Mar, Markazi, a village in Iran
- Mar, Russia, in the Sakha Republic
- Mid-Atlantic Ridge, a ridge on the floor of the Atlantic Ocean

== People ==
- Mar (surname), a Chinese and Scottish surname (including a list of people with the surname)
- Mar (singer), former name of MAA (born 1986), Japanese singer
- Mar Abhai, a saint of the Syriac Orthodox Church
- Mar Amongo (1936–2005), a Filipino illustrator
- Mar Cambrollé (born 1957), Spanish trans rights activist
- Mar Roxas (born 1957), Filipino politician

== Other uses ==
- MÄR (Marchen Awakens Romance), a 2003 Japanese manga series
- Mar (boat), a sailing tour boat based in Halifax, Nova Scotia
- Master of Arts in Religion, abbreviated as "MAR"
- Minorities at Risk, a project at the University of Maryland
- Mixed Antiglobulin Reaction (MAR), a test used in diagnosis of antisperm antibodies
- Matrix attachment region, sequences in the DNA of eukaryotic chromosomes
- Medication Administration Record, a legal record of drugs given to patients in health care systems
- Memory address register, a hardware device in a computer CPU
- Minimum Angle of Resolution, used in a LogMAR chart, a measure of visual acuity
- Missing at random, a type of missing data in statistical analysis
- Model Audit Rule 205 or MAR 205 in US financial reporting
- Molapo Armoured Regiment, an armoured regiment of the South African Army
- Modified Aspect Ratio of a film
- Mouvement Action Renouveau (Action Movement for Renewal), Republic of Congo
- Rebel Autonomous Municipalities (Spanish: Municipios Autónomos Rebeldes, abbreviated as MAR), dissolved municipalities of the Zapatista territories
- MAR, the ISO 3166-1 alpha-3 and IOC country code for Morocco
- MAR, the UNDP country code for Mauritius
- mar, the ISO 639-2 language code for Marathi language
- MAR, the IATA code for La Chinita International Airport, Maracaibo, Venezuela
- MAR, the stock symbol of Marriott International
- Mar, a fictional cat from the Ju-On Japanese horror film series
- "Mar", a song by Bea Duarte from Mulheres Que Correm

== See also ==
- Mars (disambiguation)
- Marr (disambiguation)
- Maher
- Marre (disambiguation)
- Mer (disambiguation)
