= Marre (surname) =

Marre is a surname which may refer to:

- Sir Alan Marre (1914–1990), British civil servant
- Albert Marre (1924–2012), American stage director and producer
- Hap Marre (early 20th century), American soccer player
- Jeremy Marre (1943–2020), British television director
- John Marre (early 20th century), American soccer player, team owner and executive
- Yves Marre, French entrepreneur, inventor and adventurer

== See also ==
- Mar (surname)
- Marr (surname)
- LaMarre
