= Marrou =

Marrou is a surname. Notable people with the surname include:

- Andre Marrou (born 1938), American politician
- Chris Marrou (born 1947), American news anchor
- Henri-Irénée Marrou (1904–1977), French historian

== See also ==
- Marro (surname)
