= Valve float =

Condition of an internal combustion engine

Valve float is an adverse condition which can occur at high engine speeds when the poppet valves in an internal combustion engine valvetrain do not properly follow the closure phase of the cam lobe profile. This reduces engine efficiency and performance. There is also a significant risk of severe engine damage that can include valve spring failure, pistons contacting the valves, or catastrophic lifter and cam lobe failure, especially with roller lifters.

== Similar conditions ==
'Valve lift' or "loft" is intentional, using controlled valve float to increase lift and duration of the valve open cycle. In some motorsports there are rules that limit camshaft lift, preventing this type of exploitation. Properly optimizing the valve duration avoids undue stresses to the camshaft lobes and tappets.

'Valve bounce' is a related condition where the valve does not stay seated because of the combined effects of the valve's inertia and resonance of metallic valve springs that reduce the closing force and allow the valve to re-open partially.

== Remedies ==
Stiffer valve springs can help prevent valve float and valve bounce but at the expense of increased friction losses, higher stresses, and more rapid wear in the valvetrain. Various techniques have been used to offset the effect of stiffer springs, such as dual-spring and progressive-sprung valves, roller-tipped tappets, and pneumatic valve springs.

Valve float can also be prevented by using lighter valvetrain components. Titanium valves, retainers, and pushrods are commonly used for this purpose. Undercut valves can both increase flow and decrease weight. Also, by using more than the traditional two valves per cylinder, smaller and lighter valves can be used. By reducing valvetrain mass, valves can close more rapidly with a given spring stiffness.

Pneumatic valve springs have been used in Formula One racing. Since the 1960s, Italian motorcycle manufacturer Ducati has used a desmodromic valvetrain to counter this problem and allow for higher engine speeds by using positive closing as well as opening of the valves, without springs. The system consists of a mechanical lifter mechanism that uses a second rocker arm to push the valve closed.
