= Marre =

Marre may refer to:

- Marre, Meuse, a commune in France
- La Marre, a commune in France
- Marre (surname), includes a list of people with the surname

== See also ==
- LaMarre
- Marr (disambiguation)
