= Valve job =

A valve job is the colloquial term for resurfacing the mating surfaces of the poppet valves and their respective valve seats that control the intake and exhaust of the air/fuel mixture in four stroke internal combustion engine, replacing valve oil seals, replacing any deficient valve springs, and otherwise bringing the components of a cylinder head up to manufacturer’s spec. A resurfacing of the head’s meeting surface with the engine block to true it is often done at the same time if a head has been removed from the engine.

Some reasons that may induce the need for a valve job in a modern passenger car include: excessive RPM, high mileage, overheating, material failure, corrosion, and foreign object damage (FOD).

== History ==
In the earliest automotive engines, the valves needed to be removed and the sealing surfaces sanded, ground or lapped multiple times during the life of a typical engine. As the decades passed, however, engines ran cleaner and the addition of tetraethyllead in gasoline meant that such maintenance became less frequent. Today, valve jobs are rarely done on passenger cars for the purpose of maintenance, although they are still quite common with high-performance cars.

== Description ==
A valve job is best done with grinding stones and either electric or pneumatic tools. Lapping compound and a lapping tool may be used, and is more economical for home auto repair, however lapping will only provide limited results and will not be effective on a valve or seat with anything more than very light wear or damage.

Modern engines have cylinder heads made of either iron or aluminum. Iron cylinder heads most often have integral iron valve seats. These seats are the softest and most susceptible to wear among modern engines. Much softer yet aluminum cylinder heads, however, have replaceable pressed-in hardened steel valve seats. These are significantly stronger than the integral seats of an iron head, and can be relatively easily swapped out as needed. If an integral iron seat needs to be replaced, the seat must be milled to allow the insertion of a new seat. The new seat is then installed with application of a high-strength metal glue/adhesive. Once installed, the seat is ground to the correct angle and width.

Valves and seats must have the same angle to mate properly. That angle is usually 45 degrees, but 30 degrees can be found in many modern applications. The mating angle is often accompanied by top and bottom angle cuts that are 15 degrees from each side of the mating angle (e.g. for a 45 degree seat, the top and bottom angles would be 30 and 60 degrees respectively). This method increases air-flow, which gives mild horsepower, response, and efficiency improvements.

Valves are inspected for damage such as cracking, pitting, channeling, and burning that will prevent proper operation and could lead to catastrophic failure. Pitting is permissible in small amounts, but should not be present on the valve face, margin, or stem. Channeling is a result of uneven heating of a valve (typically from improper seating during operation), and is evident by heat discoloration in an oval shape on the bottom of the valve and often visible at the base of the valve stem. Channeling that continues will lead to a burnt valve (the melting away of a portion of the valve). If an engine has been subjected to excessive RPM or sudden stoppage, all valves should be inspected for straightness, as a bent valve or valve stem will quickly lead to failure, and often damage other parts such as pistons, cylinder walls, other valves, valve guides, and valve-train components.

Some older cars have relatively soft valve seats that wear faster when operated without leaded fuel. These usually can be updated with hardened valve seats that resist wear, regardless of whether leaded or unleaded fuel is used.
