= Ben Kerkvliet =

American political scientist

Benedict John Kerkvliet (born 1943) is Emeritus Professor at the Department of Political and Social Change, School of International, Political & Strategic Studies, Australian National University. He works across the areas of comparative politics, Southeast Asia and Asian studies.

== Early life and education ==
Benedict was born and raised in Montana, surrounded by working-class relatives and friends for whom political discussion and debate were part of life. After graduating from the local public high schools, he earned his B.A. at Whitman College (Walla Walla, Washington) and his M.A. and Ph.D. at University of Wisconsin–Madison.

== Teaching ==
Kerkvliet taught at the University of Hawaiʻi at Mānoa for nearly twenty years before joining the Australian National University (ANU) in 1992. At the latter, where he was a professor and Head of the Department of Political and Social Change, Research School of Pacific and Asian Studies.

== Research ==
Kerkvliet is fascinated with how ordinary people deal with big pressures on their lives. He has emphasized research on agrarian politics in Southeast Asia. Closely related is his study of interactions between ordinary people and authorities or other elites. He is currently doing research on local reactions to major recent national policies in the Philippines and Vietnam.

== Career highlights ==
Kerkvliet taught Political Science and Southeast Asian Studies at the University of Hawaiʻi from 1971 to 1991. He has been teaching at Australian National University since 1991. He has received various international fellowships and awards for research and teaching in Asia, Australia, Europe and America. Most importantly, Kerkvliet enjoys working with industrious graduate students and living in and doing research in the Philippines and Vietnam.

== Personal life ==
Kerkvliet currently resides in Hawaiʻi with his wife Melinda.

== Works ==
=== Books ===
- Political Change in the Philippines: Studies of Local Politics Prior to Martial Law, editor, (Honolulu: The University Press of Hawaii, 1974).
- The Huk Rebellion: A Study of Peasant Revolt in the Philippines (Berkeley: University of California Press, 1977; paperback edition, 1982) (Reprinted in a Philippine edition by New Day Press, Quezon City, 1979 and several times since; Reprinted with addition of a bibliographic essay, Boulder: Rowman & Littlefield, 2002)
- Everyday Forms of Resistance in Southeast Asia, co-edited with James C. Scott, (London: Frank Cass, 1986), originally a special issue of Journal of Peasant Studies 13 (January 1986).
- Everyday Politics in the Philippines: Class and Status Relations in a Central Luzon Village (Berkeley: University of California Press, 1990, paperback and hardback). Reprinted in a Philippine edition by New Day Press, Quezon City, 1991 (Reprinted with addition of "Postscript" (pages 274–289) and bibliography, Boulder: Rowman & Littlefield, 2002)
- From Marcos to Aquino: Local Perspectives on Political Transition in the Philippines, co-edited with Resil Mojares, (Quezon City: Ateneo de Manila University Press, 1991; and Honolulu: University of Hawaiʻi Press, 1992).
- Dilemmas of Development: Vietnam Update 1994, editor, (Canberra: Department of Political and Social Change, ANU 1995).
- Vietnam's Rural Transformation, co-edited with Doug J. Porter (Boulder: Westview Press, and Singapore: Institute of Southeast Asian Studies, 1995).
- Transforming Asian Socialism: China and Vietnam Compared, co-edited with Anita Chan and Jonathan Unger (Sydney: Allen and Unwin; and Boulder: Rowman & Littlefield, 1999).
- Mot so Van De ve Nong Nghieip, Nong Dan, Nong Thon o cac Nuoc va Viet Nam [Some issues regarding agriculture, peasants, and the countryside abroad and in Vietnam], co-edited with Nguyen Quang Ngoc and James C. Scott (Hanoi: NXB The Gioi – World Publishing House, 2000).
- Getting Organized in Vietnam: Moving in and around the Socialist State, co-editor with Russell H. K. Heng and David W. H. Koh (Singapore: Institute of Southeast Asian Studies, 2003).
- Beyond Hanoi: Local Government in Vietnam, co-edited with David G. Marr (Singapore and Copenhagen: ISEAS Publications and NIAS Press, 2004).
- The Power of Everyday Politics: How Vietnamese Peasants Transformed National Policy (Ithaca: Cornell University Press, 2005). (co-published for an Asia edition with the Institute of Southeast Asian Studies, Singapore)
- Speaking Out in Vietnam: Public Political Criticism in a Communist Party-Ruled Nation (Ithaca, New York: Cornell University Press, 2019). (co-published by ISEAS Publishing, Singapore, for distribution in Southeast Asia)

=== Selected articles and other writings ===
- "A Critique of Raymond Aron's Theory of War and Prescriptions," International Studies Quarterly, 12 (December 1968): pages 419-442
- "Additional Source Materials on Philippine Radical Movements," Bulletin of Concerned Asian Scholars, 3 (Summer-Fall 1971): pages 83-90.
- "Peasant Society and Unrest Prior to the Huk Rebellion in the Philippines," Asian Studies, 9 (August 1971): pages 164-213.
- "Peasant Rebellion in the Philippines: The Origins and Growth of the HMB," (Ph.D. dissertation, University of Wisconsin, Madison, 1972).
- "A Critique of the RAND Report on the Philippines," Journal of Asian Studies, 32 (May 1973): pages 489-500.
- "Politics of Survival: Peasant Responses to 'Progress' in Southeast Asia," Journal of Southeast Asian Studies, 4 (September 1973): pages 241-268. Co-authored with James C. Scott.
- "How Traditional Rural Patrons Lose Legitimacy: A Theory with Special Reference to Southeast Asia," Cultures et developpement, 5:3 (1973): pages 500-540. Co-authored with James C. Scott. Reprinted in Steffen W. Schmidt, et al. (eds.), Friends, Followers, and Factions: A Reader in Political Clientelism (Berkeley: University of California Press, 1977), pages 439–457.
- "The Philippines: Agrarian Conditions in Luzon Prior to Martial Law," Bulletin of Concerned Asian Scholars, 5 (September 1973): pages 36-40.
- "Agrarian Conditions Since the Huk Rebellion: A Barrio in Central Luzon," in Kerkvliet, ed., Political Change in the Philippines: Studies of Local Politics Prior to Martial Law (Honolulu: The University Press of Hawaii, 1974), pages 1–76.
- "All Show, No Go: Land Reform in the Philippines," The Nation, 11 May 1974, pages 586–589.
- Testimony about conditions in the Philippines, U.S. Senate, Subcommittee on Foreign Operations (24 May 1974), and House of Representatives, Subcommittee on Asian and Pacific Affairs (5 June 1974). Printed in the Congressional Record, 120 (4 June 1974): S-9564-70.
- "Land Reform in the Philippines Since the Marcos Coup," Pacific Affairs, 47 (Fall 1974): pages 286-304.
- "Peasants and Marxists in Asia: A Review Article," Peasant Studies, 6 (October 1975): pages 7-11.
- "Land Reform: Emancipation or Counterinsurgency?" in David A. Rosenberg, ed., Marcos and Martial Law in the Philippines (Ithaca: Cornell University Press, 1979), pages 113–144.
- "Difference among Philippine Peasants: A Provincial Sample," Philippine Sociological Review, 27 (July 1979): pages 133-159. Co-authored with Werasit Sittitrai.
- "Resources for Research on Local Philippine Society," Philippine Studies Newsletter, 8 (October 1980): pages 3-9.
- "Classes and Class Relations in a Philippine Village," Philippine Sociological Review, 28 (January–December 1980): pages 31-50.
- "The Meaning of Martial Law in a Nueva Ecija Village, the Philippines," Bulletin of Concerned Asian Scholars, 14 (October–December 1982): pages 2-19.
- "Profiles of Agrarian Reform in a Nueva Ecija Village," in Antonio Ledesma, et al., eds., Second View From the Paddy (Quezon City: Ateneo de Manila University Press, 1983), pages 41–58.
- "Possible Demise of the Marcos Regime," Crossroads: Journal of Southeast Asian Studies, 1 (October 1983): pages 67-83.
- "Documentary Methods: Review of Two Films," Pilipinas: A Journal of Philippine Studies, 5 (Fall 1985): pages 110-113.
- "Everyday Resistance to Injustice in a Philippine Village," Journal of Peasant Studies, 13 (January 1986): 107-123; also in Scott and Kerkvliet, ed., Everyday Forms of Peasant Resistance in Southeast Asia (London: Frank Cass, 1986).
- "Patterns of Philippine Resistance and Rebellion, 1970-1986," Pilipinas: A Journal of Philippine Studies, 6 (Spring 1986): pages 35-52.
- "Peasants and Agricultural Workers: Implications for United States Policy," in Carl Lande (ed.), Rebuilding a Nation: Philippine Challenges and American Policy (Washington, D.C.: The Washington Institute, 1987), pages 205–218.
- "'We Are Being Oppressed by Those Already Well Off': Political Thought and Action of Wage Workers in Rural Central Luzon, the Philippines," in Michael Pinches and Salim Lakha, eds., Wage Labour and Social Change in Asia (Clayton, Victoria: Centre of Southeast Asian Studies, Monash University, 1988), pages 67–92 (also Quezon City: New Day Press, 1992, pages 68–94).
- "Understanding Politics in a Rural Community During the Transition from Marcos to Aquino," in Kerkvliet and Mojares, eds., From Marcos to Aquino (Quezon City: Ateneo de Manila University Press, 1991), pages 226–46.
- "The Transition from Marcos to Aquino," co-authored with Resil Mojares, in Kerkvliet and Mojares, eds., From Marcos to Aquino, pages 1–12.
- "Claiming the Land: Take-overs by Villagers in the Philippines with Comparisons to Indonesia, Peru, Portugal, and Russia," Journal of Peasant Studies 20 (April 1993): pages 459-493.
- "State-Village Relations in Vietnam: Contested Cooperatives and Collectivization." Working Paper, Centre of Southeast Asian Studies, Monash University, 1993. 28 pages.
- "Withdrawal and Resistance: the Political Significance of Food, Agriculture, and How People Lived During the Japanese Occupation in the Philippines," in Laurie Sears, ed., Autonomous Histories, Particular Truths: Essays in Honor of John Smail. (Madison: University of Wisconsin–Madison, 1993), 175-94. An earlier appeared in Bernd Martin and Alan Milward, eds., Agriculture and Food Supply in World War Two (West Germany: Scripta Mercaturae, 1985), pages 297–316.
- "Politics of Society in the Mid 1990s," in Ben Kerkvliet, ed., Dilemmas of Development: Vietnam Update 1994 (Canberra: Political and Social Change, Australian National University, 1995), pages 5–44.
- "Village-State Relations in Vietnam: The Effect of Everyday Politics on Decollectivization," Journal of Asian Studies, 54 (May 1995): pages 396-418.
- "Rural Vietnam in Rural Asia," co-authored with Doug J. Porter, in Kerkvliet and Porter, eds., Vietnam's Rural Transformation (Boulder: Westview Press, and Singapore: Institute of Southeast Asian Studies, 1995), pages 1–38.
- "Rural Society and State Relations in Vietnam," in Kerkvliet and Porter, eds., Vietnam's Rural Transformation.
- "Toward a More Comprehensive Analysis of Philippine Politics: Beyond the Patron-Client, Factional Framework," Journal of Southeast Asian Studies, 26(September 1995): pages 401-19.
- "Contemporary Philippine Leftist Politics in Historical Perspective," in Patricio Abinales, ed., The Revolution Falters: The Left in Philippine Politics after 1986 (Ithaca, New York: Southeast Asia Program, Cornell University, 1996), pages 9–27.
- "Contested Meanings of Elections in the Philippines," in R. H. Taylor, ed., The Politics of Elections in Southeast Asia (Cambridge: Cambridge University Press, and Washington, D.C.: Woodrow Wilson Center Press, 1996), pp. 136–63.
- "Partial Impressions of Society in Vietnam," in Adam Fforde, ed., Doi Moi: Ten Years after the 1986 Party Congress (Canberra: Dept. of Political and Social Change, Research School of Pacific and Asian Studies, 1997), pp. 47–79.
- "Land Struggles and Land Regimes in the Philippines and Vietnam during the Twentieth Century," Wertheim Lecture (Amsterdam: Centre for Asian Studies Amsterdam, 1997), 40 pages.
- "Comparing the Chinese and Vietnamese Reforms: An Introduction," co-authored with Anita Chan and Jonathan Unger, The China Journal 40(July 1998): pages 1-7.
- "Agrarian Transformations in China and Vietnam," co-authored with Mark Selden, The China Journal 40 (July 1998): pages 37-58.
- "Land Regimes and State Strengths and Weaknesses in the Philippines and Vietnam," in Peter Dauvergne, ed., Weak and Strong States in Asia-Pacific Societies (Sydney: Allen and Unwin, 1998), pages 158–174.
- “Wobbly Foundations: Building Co-operatives in Rural Vietnam,” Southeast Asia Research 6 (November 1998): pages 193-251.
- “Comparing Vietnam and China,” co-authored with Anita Chan, Benedict Kerkvliet, and Jonathan Unger, in our edited book Transforming Asian Socialism: China and Vietnam Compared (Sydney: Allen and Unwin, 1999), pages 1–14.
- "Accelerating Cooperatives in Rural Vietnam, 1955-1961," in Bernhard Dahm and Vincent J. H. Hauben, eds., Vietnamese Villages in Transition (Passau: Department of Southeast Asian Studies, Passau University, 1999), pages 53–88.
- "Dialogical Law Making and Implementation in Vietnam," in Alice Tay, ed., East Asia, Human Rights, Nation Building and Trade (Baden-Baden, Germany: Nomos Verlagsgesellschaft, 1999), pages 372–400.
- "Advocating Vietnam Studies: Phan Huy Le and the Center for Vietnam Studies and Cultural Exchange," in Philippe Papin and John Kleinen, eds., Liber Amirorum: Melanges offerts au Professeur Phan Huy Le (Hanoi: NXB Thanh Nien, 1999), pages 103–17.
- "Manuela Santa Ana vda. de Maclang and Philippine Politics," in Alfred McCoy, ed., Lives at the Margin: Biography of Filipinos Obscure, Ordinary, and Heroic (Madison: Center for Southeast Asian Studies, University of Wisconsin–Madison; and Quezon City: Ateneo de Manila University Press, 2000), pages 389–421.
- “Political Ironies in the Philippines,” forward for book by Jennifer Conroy Franco, Campaigning for Democracy: Grassroots Citizenship Movements, Less-The-Democratic Elections, and Regime Transition in the Philippines (Quezon City: Institute for Popular Democracy, 2000), pages xv-xxii (New York City: Routledge, 2001), pages xxi-xxiv.
- "Analyzing the State in Vietnam," Sojourn: Journal of Social Issues in Southeast Asia 16:2 (2001): pages 179-86.
- "An Approach for Analyzing State-Society Relations in Vietnam," Sojourn: Journal of Social Issues in Southeast Asia 16:2 (2001): pages 238-78.
- "Reverberations of Freedom in the Philippines and Vietnam," in Robert Taylor, ed., Freedom in Africa and Asia (Palo Alto: Stanford University Press, 2002), pages 182–213, 297-308.
- "Grappling with Organizations and the State in Contemporary Vietnam," in Benedict J. Tria Kerkvliet, Russell H. K. Heng, and David W. H. Koh, eds., Getting Organized in Vietnam: Moving in and around the Socialist State (Singapore: Institute of Southeast Asian Studies, 2003), pages 1–24.
- "Authorities and the People: An Analysis of State-Society Relations in Vietnam," in Hy V. Luong, ed., Postwar Vietnam: Dynamics of a Transforming Society (Boulder: Rowman & Littlefield, and Singapore: Institute of Southeast Asian Studies, 2003), pages 27–53.
- “Agrarian Policy Renovation in Vietnam from the Bottom Up,” Taiwan Journal of Southeast Asian Studies 1 (October 2004): pages 19-36.
- "Surveying Local Government and Authority in Contemporary Vietnam," in Benedict J. Tria Kerkvliet and David G. Marr, eds., Beyond Hanoi: Local Government in Vietnam (Singapore and Copenhagen: ISEAS Publications and NIAS Press, 2004), pages 1–27.
- "Politics in Vietnam’s Red River Delta in the 1970s-1980s (and Why it is Relevant to the 2000s)," in Edwina Palmer, ed., Asian Futures, Asian Traditions (Kent: Global Oriental, 2005), pages 143–56.
- "Political Expectations and Democracy in the Philippines and Vietnam," Philippine Political Science Journal, 26 (no. 49, 2005): pages 1-26.
- "Agricultural Land in Vietnam: Markets Tempered by Family, Community and Socialist Practices," Journal of Agrarian Change 6 (July 2006): pages 285-305.
- "In-Depth Research and Knowledge Accumulation About Agrarian Politics in Southeast Asia," in Erik Martinez Kuhonta, Dan Slater, and Tuong Vu, eds., Southeast Asia in Political Science: Theory, Region, and Qualitative Analysis (Stanford: Stanford University Press, 2008), pages 129-43.
- "Forms of Engagement between State Agencies & Civil Society Organizations in Vietnam," co-written with Nguyễn Quang A and Bạch Tân Sinh. Prepared for the VUFO-NGO Resource Centre, Hanoi, December 2008 (63 pages).
- "Everyday Politics in Peasant Societies (and Ours)," Journal of Peasant Studies, 36:1 (2009): pages 227-43. Reprinted in Critical Perspectives in Rural Development Studies, pages 215–31, edited by Saturnino M. Borras Jr. (London: Routledge, 2010).
- "Southeast Asia," in R.A.W. Rhodes, ed., The Australian Study of Politics (England: Palgrave Macmillan, 2009), pages 257-67.
- "Workers’ Protests in Contemporary Vietnam (with Some Comparisons to those in the Pre-1975 South)," Journal of Vietnamese Studies, 5:1 (2010): pages 162-204. Republished with some revisions as "Workers' Protests in Contemporary Vietnam," in Labour in Vietnam, edited by Anita Chan (Singapore: Institute of Southeast Asian Studies, 2011), pages 160-210.
- "Governance, Development, and the Responsive-Repressive State in Vietnam," Forum for Development Studies 37 (March 2010): pages 33-60.
- "A Different View of Insurgencies," In Search of a Human Face: 15 Years of Knowledge Building for Human Development in the Philippines (Quezon City: Human Development Network, 2010), pages 268-79.
- “Government Repression and Toleration in Contemporary Vietnam,” Working Paper 119, Southeast Asia Research Centre, City University of Hong Kong, 2012.
- Small articles, mainly on aspects of Philippine history, society, and politics have been published in the Encyclopedia of Asian History (New York: Scribners, 1987), Encyclopedia of Political Revolutions (Washington, D.C.: Congressional Quarterly Books, 1998), Los Angeles Times, International Herald Tribune, Honolulu Star-Bulletin, Honolulu Advertiser, and The Australian
