= Marr =

Marr may refer to:

== Places ==
- Marr, Scotland, an area in Aberdeenshire, Scotland, which historically was a province
- Marr, South Yorkshire, a village in England

== People ==
- Marr (surname)

== Businesses ==
- Marr (automobile) (1903–1904), an American automobile company
- Marr & Holman, an American architectural firm
- Marr and Colton, an American pipe organ company

== Other uses ==
- Marr baronets, a British title
- Marr Prize, a computer vision award
- Marr College, a school in Troon, South Ayrshire, Scotland
- Marr Residence, a historic site in Saskatoon, Saskatchewan, Canada
- Marr or Marrette, a twist-on wire connector
- Minimum acceptable rate of return or MARR, a project finance concept

== See also ==
- Mar (disambiguation)
- Marre (disambiguation)
- Maher
- MARRS, a recording collective
- Mars (disambiguation)
