= Marro (surname) =

Marro is a surname. Notable people with this surname include:

- Antonio Marro (1840–1913), Italian psychiatrist
- Baldo Marro, also known as Teodoro Galan Baldomaro (1949-2017), an actor, screenwriter, film director and producer in the Philippines
- Guillermo Marro (born 1983), Argentine Paralympic swimmer
- Joseph R. Marro (1907–1989), an American lawyer and politician from New York
- Marius Marro (born 1955), Swiss equestrian
- Natacha Marro, a French maker of shoes and boots
- Rudolf Marro (born 1953), a Swiss wrestler
- Stephen Marro, an American film director, writer, producer based in New York
- Torr Marro, a retired lacrosse midfielder
- Xander Marro (born 1975), an American artist, underground puppet maker, and arts non-profit director

== See also ==
- Marr (surname)
- Marro, a river in Italy
