= Bill Marr =

Bill Marr may refer to:

- Bill Maher (born 1956), American comedian and political commentator
- William Marr (born 1936), engineering researcher and poet
