= John Marr =

John Marr or Johnny Marr may refer to:

- John Marr (before 1410–after 1454), Scottish regional administrator (List of Provosts and Lord Provosts of Aberdeen)
- John Quincy Marr (1825–1861), American military officer
- John Edward Marr (1857–1933), English geologist and academic
- John Ralston Marr, British Indologist and writer
- John S. Marr (born 1940), American physician, epidemiologist, and author
- Johnny Marr (born 1963), English musician

== See also ==
- John Marr and Other Sailors, collection of poems by Herman Melville
- John Marre, American soccer player
- Marr (disambiguation)
- John Marrs (author)
