= Petrace =

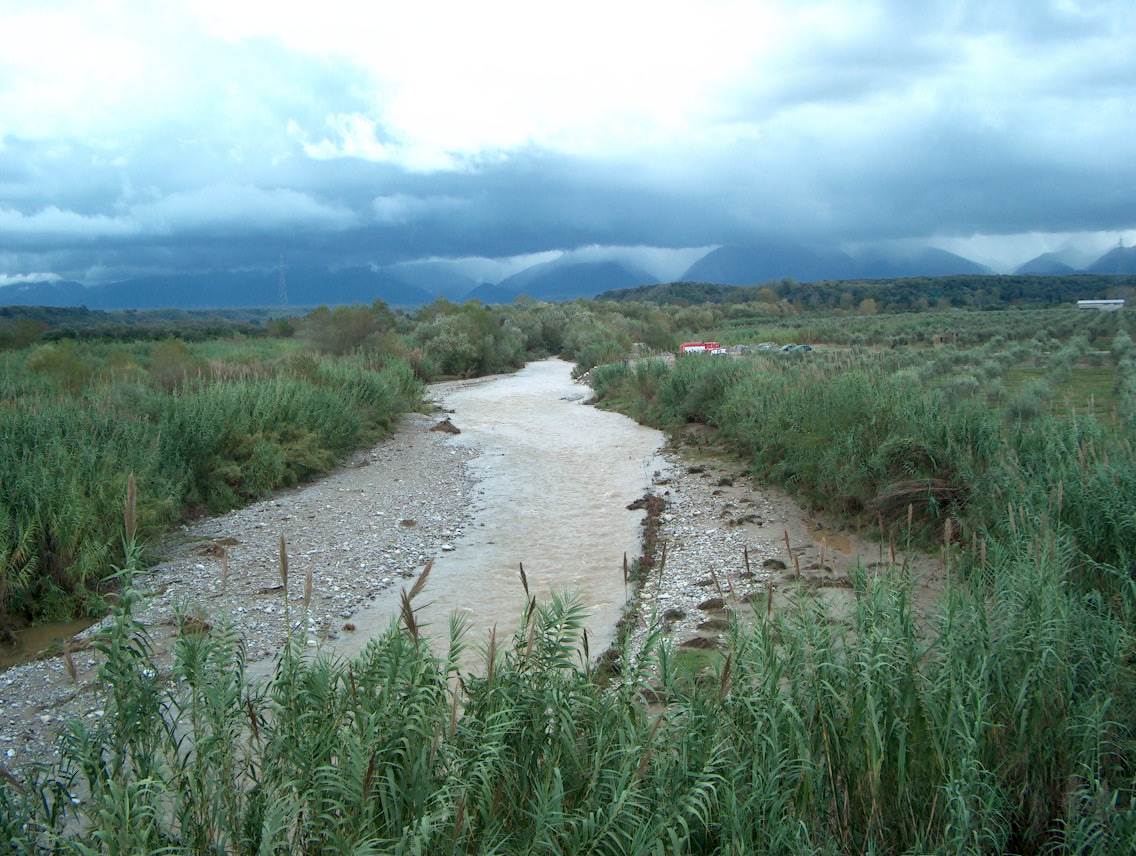

Location
- Country: Italy

Physical characteristics
- Mouth: Tyrrhenian Sea
  - coordinates: 38.421653°N 15.876384°E
- Length: more than 40 km (25 mi)
- Basin size: 407 km^{2} (157 sq mi)

The Petrace (Fiume Petrace) is a river in the Calabria region of Italy. It flows into the Tyrrhenian Sea at Gioia Tauro. It was known as the Metaurus in Latin. Its main stream length is over 40 kilometres (25 mi), and it has a drainage basin of 407 square kilometres (157 sq mi). It is formed at the confluence of the rivers Marro and Duverso.
