= The China Journal =

- Discipline: Area studies
- Language: English
- Edited by: Ben Hillman

Publication details
- Former name(s): The Australian Journal of Chinese Affairs
- History: 1979–present
- Publisher: University of Chicago Press for the Australian Centre on China at Australian National University
- Frequency: 2 issues/year
- Impact factor: 2.750 (2019)

Standard abbreviations
- ISO 4: China J.

Indexing
- ISSN: 1324-9347 (print); 1835-8535 (web)
- JSTOR: chinaj
- OCLC no.: 1127472705

Links
- Journal homepage

The China Journal is a peer-reviewed academic journal focused on China. It covers anthropology, sociology, and political science. Two issues are published per year by University of Chicago Press on behalf of the Australian Centre on China in the World at the Australian National University (having previously been published on behalf of ANU's College of Asia and the Pacific). Its current editor is Ben Hillman (ANU), associate editor is Edward Sing Yue Chan (ANU), and book review editor is Jonathan Unger (ANU).

== History ==
The Journal was previously titled The Australian Journal of Chinese Affairs (ISSN 0156-7365), under which name it was published from 1979 to 1995.

== Abstracting and indexing ==
The journal is abstracted and indexed in the Social Sciences Citation Index and is listed in the Journal Citation Reports with a 2023 impact factor of 4.7, ranking #1 out of 176 “Area Studies” journals. It is also indexed in PubMed, International Bibliography of the Social Sciences, GEOBASE, Historical Abstracts, International Political Science Abstracts, ProQuest 5000, and MLA International Bibliography.
