= David Marr =

David Marr may refer to:

- David Marr (neuroscientist) (1945–1980), British neuroscientist
- David Marr (journalist) (born 1947), Australian journalist and biographer
- David G. Marr (born 1937), American historian
- Dave Marr (1933–1997), golfer and sportscaster
