= David G. Marr =

American/Australian historian (born 1937)

David G. Marr FAHA
- Born: September 22, 1937 (age 89); Macon, Georgia, United States
- Citizenship: United States/Australia
- Known for: Modern history of Vietnam

Academic background
- Education: Dartmouth College (BA); University of California, Berkeley (MA; PhD 1968)
- Doctoral advisor: Frederic Wakeman

Academic work
- Discipline: History
- Institutions: Cornell University, University of California, Australian National University

David George Marr FAHA (born September 22, 1937) is an American/Australian historian specializing in the modern history of Vietnam. He was also a critic of the Vietnam War.

== Career ==
Marr was born in Macon, Georgia, the son of Henry George (an auditor) and Louise M. (a teacher; maiden name Brown). Marr studied at Dartmouth College (BA), before joining the US Marine Corps as an intelligence officer. Marr learned Vietnamese in the US, then was assigned to Vietnam in 1962. He married there in April 1963, and was reassigned to marine Intelligence in Hawaii a month later. After leaving the Marines in 1964 he sought to understand the roots of Vietnamese patriotism as a graduate student at UC Berkeley (PhD 1968). He taught at University of California, Berkeley and as assistant professor at Cornell University, 1969–72, while becoming increasingly engaged in documenting the case for withdrawing from Viet Nam, notably as co-director of the Indochina Resource Center (Washington and Berkeley), 1971–75. In 1975 he moved to Australia with his family, in research positions as Fellow, Senior Fellow and finally Professor at the Research School of Pacific (and Asian) Studies, Australian National University in Canberra. He was elected a Fellow of the Australian Academy of the Humanities in 1990. In 1996, Marr had the opportunity to meet General Võ Nguyên Giáp. He has also been editor of Vietnam Today, and was an Emeritus Professor at the College of Asia and the Pacific, Australian National University.

A Pulitzer Prize-winning journalist Fox Butterfield described Marr's book Vietnamese Anticolonialism as "a brilliant study of the origins of nationalism in Vietnam". Marr's book, Vietnam 1945: The Quest for Power, received the John K. Fairbank Prize from the American Historical Association in 1996. In 2009, he was awarded the Vietnam Studies Award by the Phan Chau Trinh Cultural Foundation for his significant contributions to the study of Vietnamese history. In addition, Marr's book Vietnamese Tradition on Trial, 1920–1945 has been translated and circulated in Vietnam.

== Publications ==
=== Books ===
- Marr, David G. (1971). Vietnamese Anticolonialism 1885–1925. Berkeley, California: University of California Press. doi:10.1525/9780520334458. ISBN 978-0-520-04277-3. JSTOR jj.8501328. LCCN 75129611. OCLC 155924. S2CID 154404587.
- Marr, David G.; Reid, Anthony, eds. (1979). Perceptions of the Past in Southeast Asia. Singapore: Heinemann Educational Books (Asia). ISBN 978-0-7081-1759-0. LCCN 80942017. OCLC 247270840.
- Marr, David G. (1981). Vietnamese Tradition on Trial, 1920–1945. Berkeley, California: University of California Press. doi:10.1525/9780520907447. ISBN 978-0-520-05081-5. JSTOR 10.1525/j.ctt1ppv48. LCCN 80015802. OCLC 6356558. S2CID 144570372. Project MUSE book 25545.
- Marr, David G.; Milner, Anthony Crothers, eds. (1986). Southeast Asia in the 9th to 14th Centuries. Singapore: ISEAS – Yusof Ishak Institute, Australian National University. doi:10.1355/9789814377935. ISBN 978-9971-9-8839-5. LCCN 87940571. OCLC 15686254. S2CID 154518068.
- Marr, David G.; Alilunas-Rodgers, Kristine (1992). Vietnam (World Bibliographical Series). Vol. 147. Oxford, Santa Barbara, California, Denver: Clio Press. ISBN 978-1-85109-092-1. LCCN 93223446. OCLC 231459097.
- Marr, David G. (1995). Vietnam 1945: The Quest for Power. Berkeley, California: University of California Press. ISBN 978-0-520-21228-2. JSTOR jj.5973155. LCCN 95015856. OCLC 32347002.
- Marr, David G.; Kerkvliet, Ben, eds. (2004). Beyond Hanoi: Local Government in Vietnam. Singapore: NIAS Press. doi:10.1355/9789812305947. ISBN 978-981-230-222-9. LCCN 2004348996. OCLC 56760110. S2CID 127151848. Project MUSE book 19405.
- Marr, David G. (2013). Vietnam: State, War, and Revolution (1945–1946). Berkeley, California: University of California Press. doi:10.1525/california/9780520274150.001.0001. ISBN 978-0-520-27415-0. JSTOR 10.1525/j.ctt2jcbjf. LCCN 2012036193. OCLC 1254090673. S2CID 160951428. Project MUSE book 26076.

=== Articles ===
- Marr, David G. (September 28, 1969). "Dangers in Indochina". The New York Times. ISSN 0362-4331. Archived from the original on May 16, 2025.
- Marr, David G. (August 31, 2009). "Vibrations from the north". Inside Story. ISSN 1837-0497. Archived from the original on May 16, 2025.
- Marr, David G. (March 23, 2012). "Vietnam's high-profile land dispute". Inside Story. ISSN 1837-0497. Archived from the original on May 15, 2025.
- Marr, David G. (October 10, 2013). "A moment when everything seemed possible". Inside Story. ISSN 1837-0497. Archived from the original on May 16, 2025.

=== Papers ===
- Marr, David G. (1966). "Political Attitudes and Activities of Young Urban Intellectuals in South Viet-Nam". Asian Survey. 6 (5). University of California Press: 249–263. doi:10.2307/2642535. ISSN 1533-838X. OCLC 5972263314. S2CID 154367746.
- Marr, David G. (1971). "The United States in Vietnam: A Study in Futility". The Annals of the American Academy of Political and Social Science. 397 (1). Sage Publishing: 11–18. doi:10.1177/000271627139700103. ISSN 1552-3349. JSTOR 1039013. OCLC 9974712058. S2CID 145631415.
- Marr, David G. (1976). "The 1920s Women's Rights Debates in Vietnam". The Journal of Asian Studies. 35 (3). Duke University Press: 371–389. doi:10.2307/2053270. ISSN 1752-0401. JSTOR 2053270. OCLC 8272591180. S2CID 155040258. ProQuest 218136486.
- Marr, David G. (1995). "Signs of C. S. Peirce". American Literary History. 7 (4). Oxford University Press: 681–699. doi:10.1093/alh/7.4.681. ISSN 0896-7148. JSTOR 490069. OCLC 9970599264. S2CID 143775952.
- Marr, David G.; Rosen, Stanley (1998). "Chinese and Vietnamese Youth in the 1990s". The China Journal. 40. University of Chicago Press: 145–172. doi:10.2307/2667457. ISSN 1835-8535. JSTOR 2667457. OCLC 7128955818. S2CID 147236495.
- Marr, David G. (2000). "Concepts of 'Individual' and 'Self' in Twentieth-Century Vietnam". Modern Asian Studies. 34 (4). Cambridge University Press: 769–796. doi:10.1017/S0026749X00003851. ISSN 1469-8099. JSTOR 313131. OCLC 9982530234. S2CID 146126982.
- Marr, David G. (2000). "History and Memory in Vietnam Today: The Journal Xua & Nay". Journal of Southeast Asian Studies. 31 (1). Cambridge University Press: 1–25. doi:10.1017/S002246340001585X. ISSN 0022-4634. JSTOR 20072198. OCLC 9982718292. S2CID 159949020.
- Marr, David G. (2020). "Early US Marine Operations in Vietnam: A Young Officer's Experience". Journal of Vietnamese Studies. 15 (2). University of California Press: 87–151. doi:10.1525/vs.2020.15.2.87. ISSN 1559-3738. JSTOR 48740352. OCLC 1426981618.
