= Valvetrain =

Mechanical system in an internal combustion engine

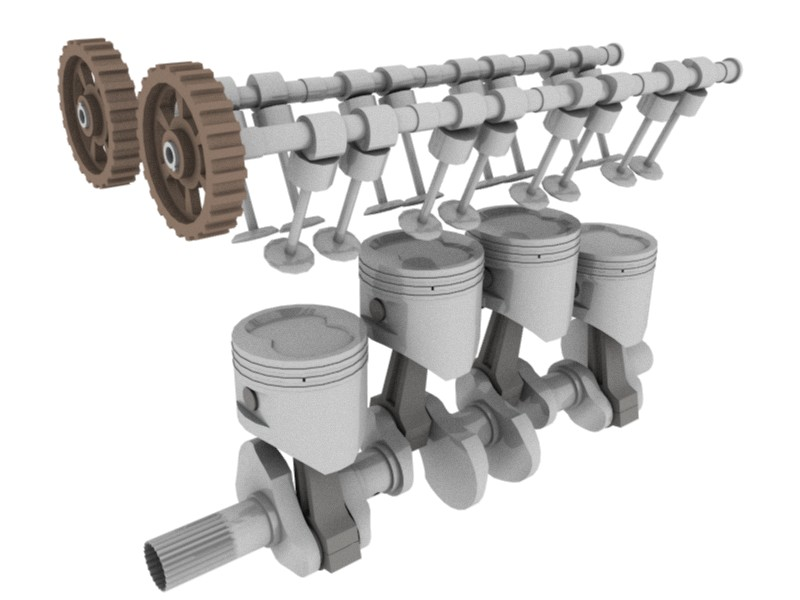
Cutaway of a dual overhead camshaft engine

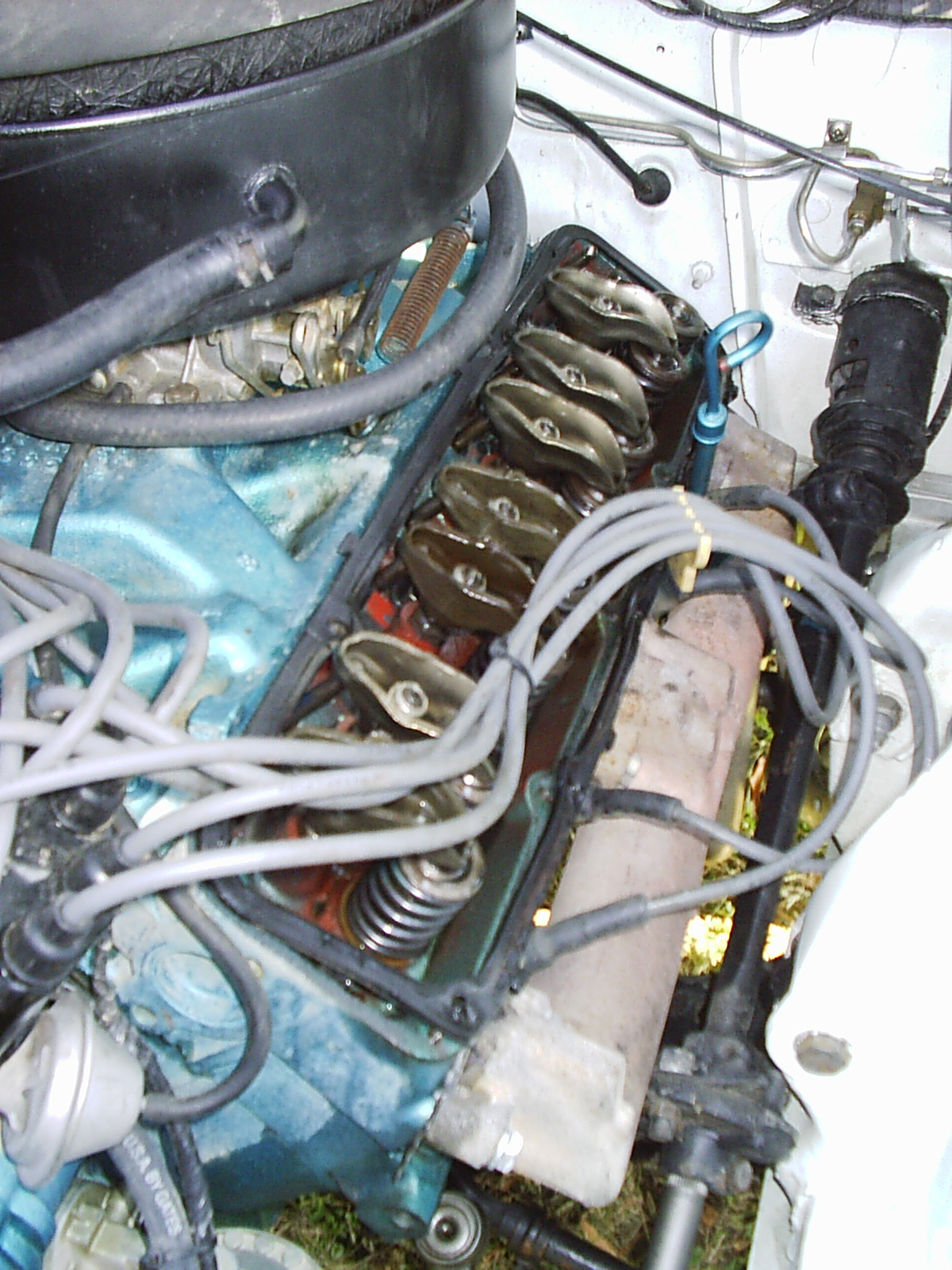
1969 AMC V8 overhead valve engine. The rocker cover has been removed, so elements of the pushrods, rocker arms, valve springs, and valves are visible.

A valvetrain is a mechanical system that controls the operation of the intake and exhaust valves in an internal combustion engine. The intake valves control the flow of air/fuel mixture (or air alone for direct-injected engines) into the combustion chamber, while the exhaust valves control the flow of spent exhaust gases out of the combustion chamber once combustion is completed.

== Layout ==
The valvetrain layout is largely dependent on the location of the camshaft. The common valvetrain configurations for piston engines, in order from oldest to newest, are:

- Flathead engine: A single camshaft and the valves are located in the engine block below the cylinder or cylinder bank.
- Overhead valve engine: A single camshaft remains in the block below the cylinder(s), however the valves are located in the cylinder head above the combustion chamber.
- Overhead camshaft engine: Both the valves and one or more camshafts are located in the cylinder head above the cylinders or cylinder banks.

== Components ==
The valvetrain consists of all the components responsible for transferring the rotational movement of the camshaft into the opening and closing of the intake and exhaust valves. Typical components are listed below in order from the crankshaft to the valves.

=== Camshaft ===
The timing and lift profile of the valve opening events are controlled by the camshafts, through use of a carefully shaped lobe on a rotating shaft. The camshaft is driven by the crankshaft and, in the case of a four-stroke engine, rotates at half the speed of the crankshaft.

Motion is transferred from the crankshaft to the camshaft most commonly by a rubber timing belt, a metallic timing chain or a set of gears.

=== Pushrod ===
Pushrods are long, slender metal rods that are used in overhead valve engines to transfer motion from the camshaft (located in the engine block) to the valves (located in the cylinder head). The bottom end of a pushrod is mated to a lifter, upon which the camshaft makes contact. The camshaft lobe moves the lifter upwards, which moves the pushrod. The top end of the pushrod pushes on the rocker arm, which opens the valve.

=== Rocker arm / Finger / Bucket tappet ===
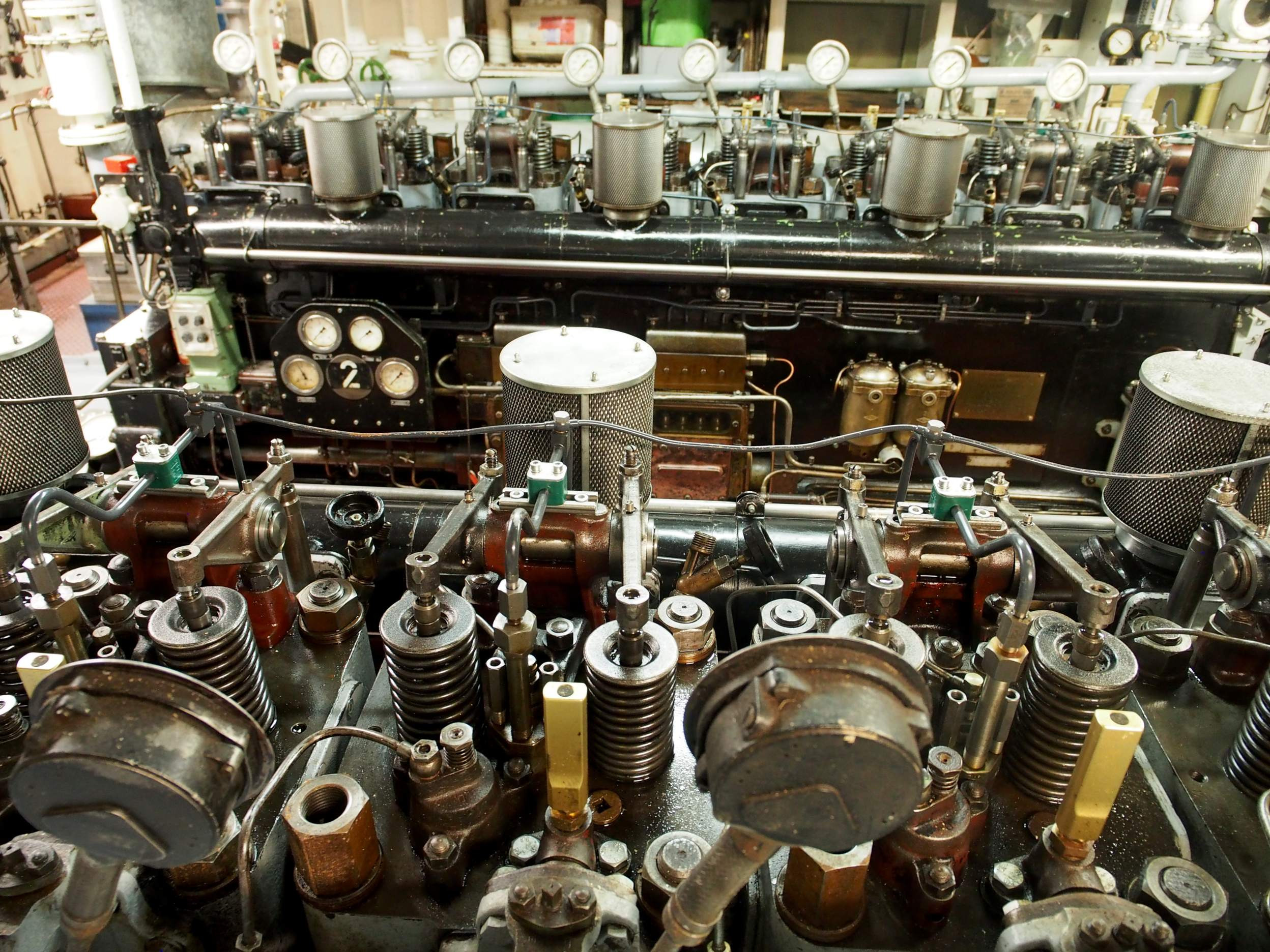
Ship engine with open rocker arms

Depending on the design used, the valves are actuated by a rocker arm, finger, or bucket tappet. Overhead valve engines use rocker arms, which are actuated from below indirectly (through the pushrods) by the cam lobes. Overhead camshaft engines use rockers or fingers or bucket tappets.

=== Valves ===
Most modern engines use poppet valves, although sleeve valves, slide valves and rotary valves have also been used at times. Poppet valves are typically opened by the camshaft lobe or rocker arm, and closed by a coiled spring called a valve spring.

Valve float occurs when the valve spring is unable to control the inertia of the valvetrain at high engine speeds (RPM).

=== Valve guide ===
Valve guides ensure that engine valves are properly aligned, support the intake/exhaust valve stem, stabilize valve angle, and allow heat to escape to the cylinder head.

== See also ==
- Cam-in-block
- Camless piston engine
