= Don H. Marr =

American painter

Don H. Marr is an American artist. His paintings reflect the romantic realism and seriocomic surrealism (or humorous satirical) genres, while using materials such as acrylic, oil pastels and gold leaf. His pieces frequently incorporate calligraphy. His realist paintings are housed in the permanent collections of the Arkansas Arts Center, the Arkansas Historical Society, and the Biedenharn Museum in Monroe, Louisiana. In the 1960s he was commissioned to do several large public works, including "Pine Bluff Pine" for the Pine Bluff, Arkansas public library.

A native of Missouri, Marr received a Bachelor of Arts degree in 1953 from the University of Tennessee. He received his master's degree in fine art from the University of Arkansas in 1958. He taught art and art history at Hendrix College from 1959 to 2000. In 1991 he was named the Louis and Charlotte Cabe Distinguished Professor of Art. He passed on March 31, 2013.
