= Marro =

Location
- Country: Italy

Physical characteristics
- Mouth: Petrace
  - coordinates: 38.3670°N 15.9198°E

Basin features
- Progression: Petrace→ Tyrrhenian Sea

The Marro is an Italian river in the province of Reggio Calabria. It is one of the source rivers of the Petrace. Its source is south of Cittanova and north of the Aspromonte. It has two tributaries which flow north from their sources in the Aspromonte into the Marro. The Marro flows northwest and empties into the Petrace south of Gioia Tauro.
