= Souk El Marr =

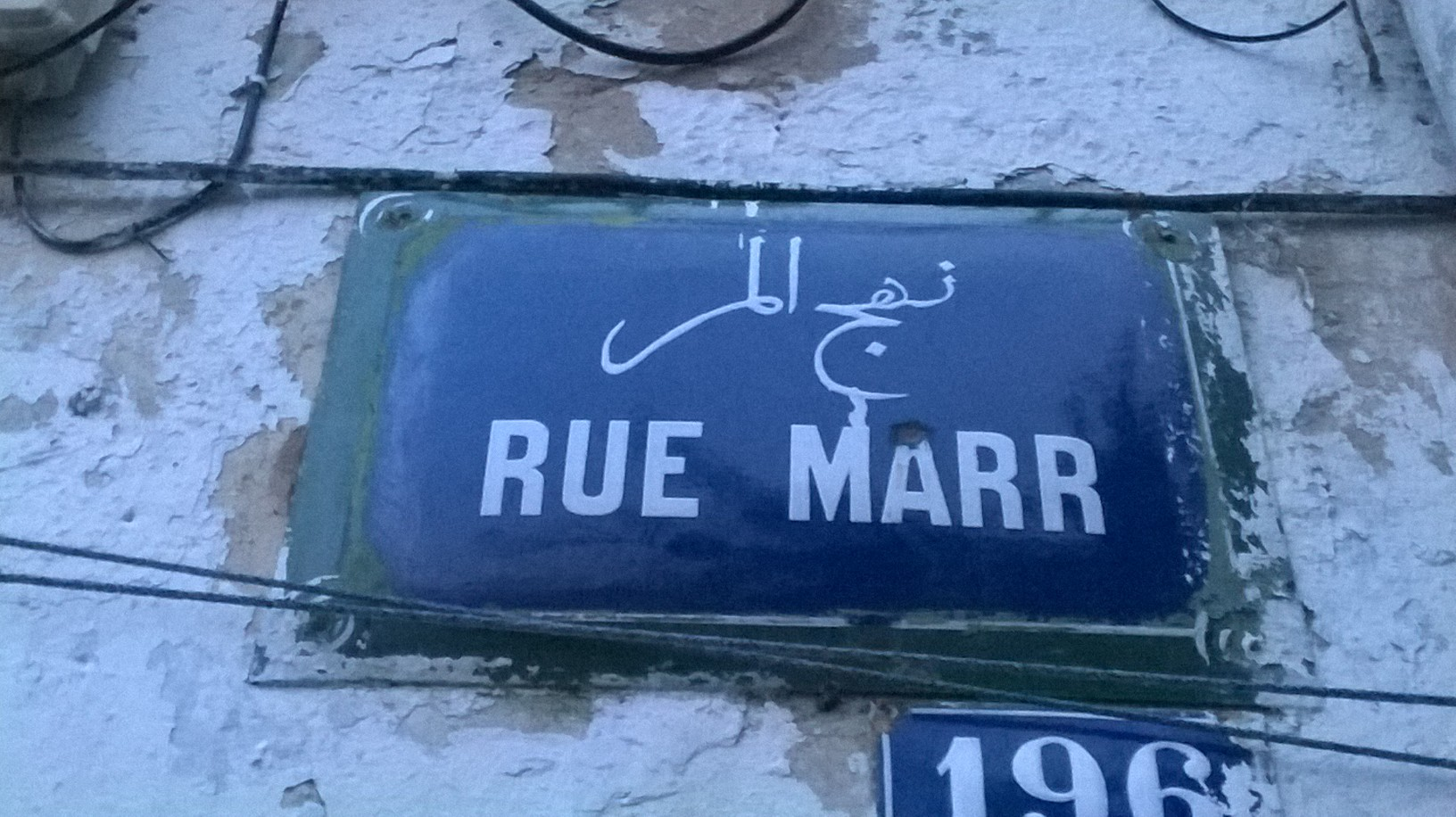
Metallic sign indicating Souk El Marr

Souk El Marr (Arabic: سوق المر) is one of the souks of Tunis. Its products are diverse items of daily use.

== Location ==
The souk is located behind Bab Menara, one of the doors of the medina of Tunis, near the Ksar Mosque and the zawiya of Lella Arbia.

Zawiya of Sidi Abderraouf El Marr as well as the technical college of the Sidi Abderraouf El Marr alley, the Sidi El Ragrag Mosque and the El Marr Hammam can be found in the vicinity.

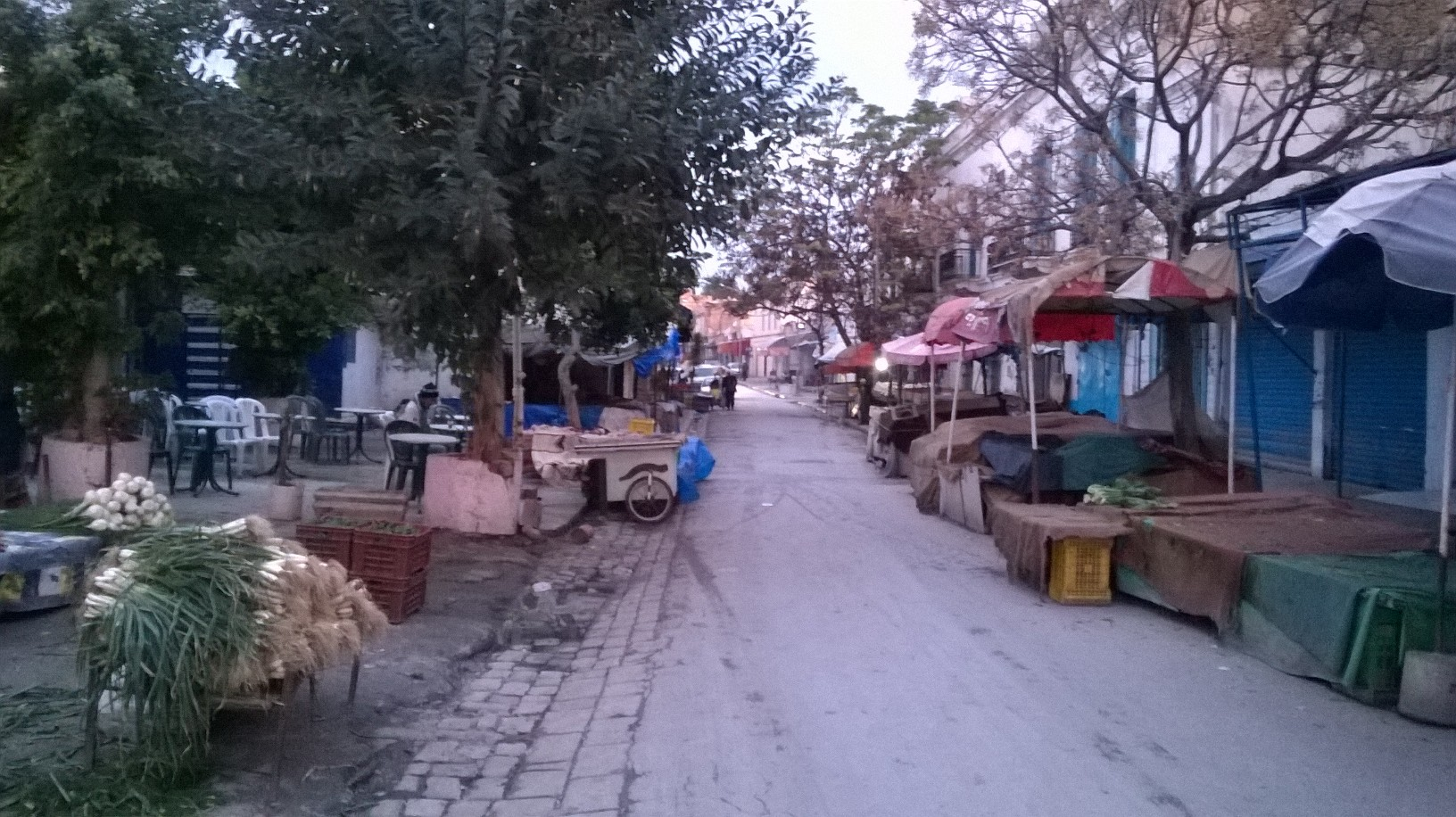
View of the souk

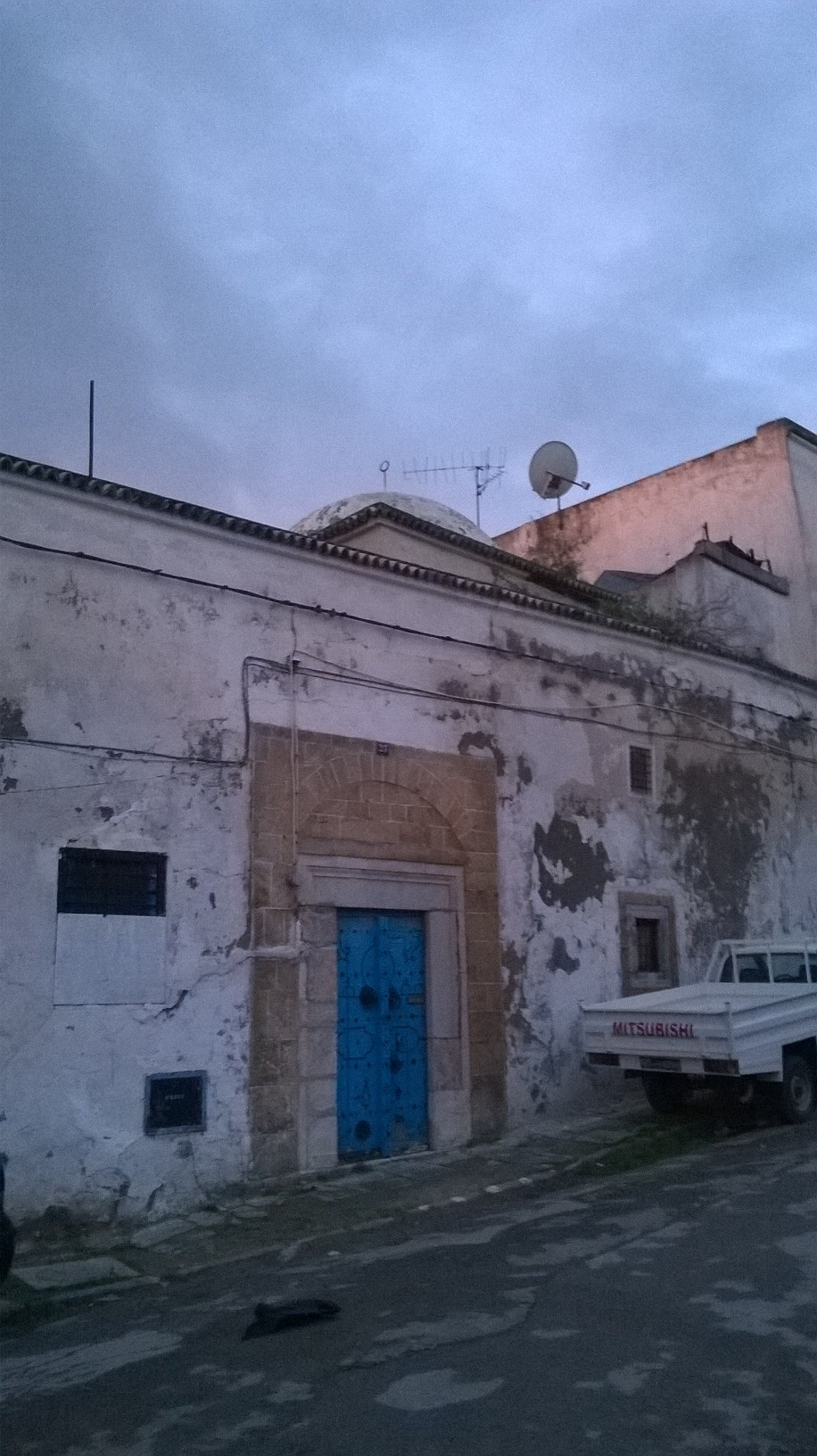
Zawiya of Sidi Abderraouf El Marr

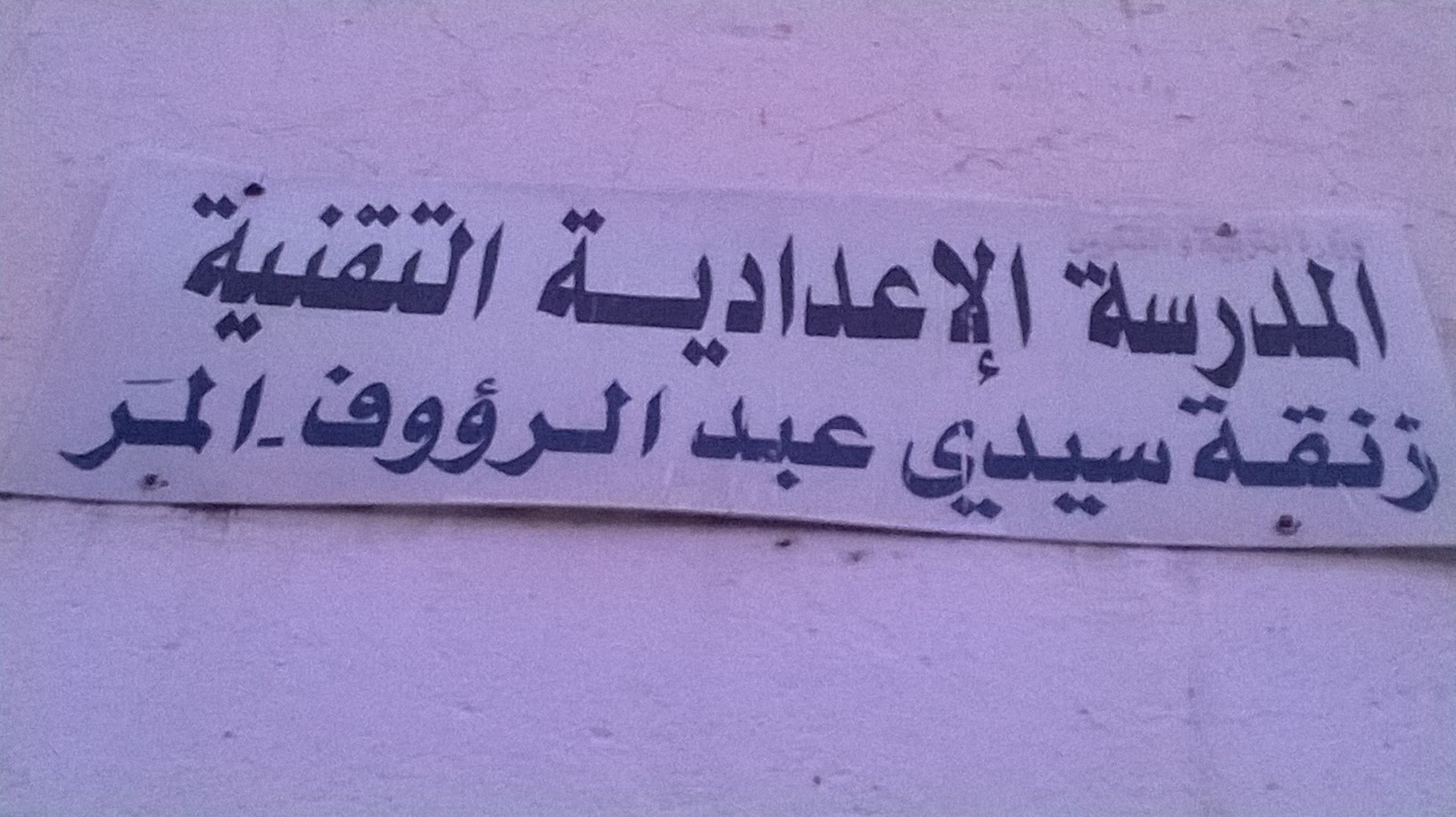
Metallic sign indicating the technical college
