= William Marr =

American writer and engineering researcher

William W. Marr (simplified Chinese: 马为义; traditional Chinese: 馬為義; born September 3, 1936) is a poet.

== Publications ==
- In the Windy City, Chinese/English, Li Poetry Society, Taipei, Taiwan, 1975
- Selected Poems of William Marr, Taiwan Commercial Press, Taipei, Taiwan, 1983
- The White Horse, Times Publishing Company, Taipei, Taiwan, 1984
- Anthology of Fei Ma's Poetry, Joint Publishing, Hong Kong, 1984
- The Resounding Echos of Hoof Beats, Li Poetry Society, Taipei, Taiwan, 1986
- Road, Elite Publishing Co., Taipei, Taiwan, 1986
- Anthology of Short Poems by Fei Ma, Strait Art Publishing House, Fuzhou, China, 1990
- CHANSONS, translation of selected poems by Pai Chiu, Chinese/English, Giant Publishing Co., Taipei, 1972; Rock Publisher, Taipei, 1991
- Fly! Spirit, Morning Star Publishing Co., Taichung, Taiwan, 1992
- Anthology of Self-selected poems by Fei Ma, Guizhou People's Press, 1993
- Autumn Window, anthology of English poems, Arbor Hill Press, Chicago, 1995; 2nd Edition, 1996
- The Microscopic World, Taichung Cultural Center, Taichung, Taiwan, 1998
- Let the Feast Begin—My Favorite English Poems, English/Chinese, Bookman Publishing Co., Taipei, 1999
- The Poetic Art of Fei Ma, Writers Publishing House, Beijing, China, 1999
- Not All Flowers Need to Bear Fruits, Bookman Books Co., Taipei, Taiwan, 2000
- Poems of Fei Ma, Flower City Publishing House, Guangzhou, China, 2000
- Selected Poems of William Marr, The Milkyway Publishing Co., Hong Kong, 2003
- Selected Poems of William Marr, Chinese/English, The World Contemporary Poetry Series, The Milky Way Publishing Co., Hong Kong, 2003
- Anthology of Poems by Fei Ma, National Museum of Taiwan Literature, Tainan, Taiwan, 2009
- Between Heaven and Earth, selected poems in English, PublishAmerica, Baltimore, 2010
- You Are the Wind, Anthology of Fei Ma's Poetry, Vol. 1 (1950-1979), Showwe, Taipei, Taiwan, 2011
- Dream Design, Anthology of Fei Ma's Poetry, Vol. 2 (1980-1989), Showwe, Taipei, Taiwan, 2011
- The World of Grasshoppers, Anthology of Fei Ma's Poetry, Vol. 3 (1990-1999), Showwe, Taipei, Taiwan, 2012
- The Sunshine Scarf, Anthology of Fei Ma's Poetry, Vol. 4 (2000-2012), Showwe, Taipei, Taiwan, 2012
- Beyond Space and Time, Anthology of Fei Ma's Poetry, Vol. 5 (2013-2021), Showwe, Taipei, Taiwan, 2022
- CHANSONS POUR TOI ET MOI, Chinese/French, (French translator: Athanase Vantchev de Thracy), The Cultural Institute of Solenza, Paris, 2014
- Chicago Serenade, Chinese/English/French, (French translator: Athanase Vantchev de Thracy), The Cultural Institute of Solenza, Paris, 2015
- SONGS OF MY OWN, translation of Poems by Li Qing-Song, Chinese/English, Writers Publishing House, Beijing, 2015
- SUMMER SONGS, English translation of poems by Lin Ming-Li, Chinese/English/French, The Cultural Institute of Solenza, Paris, 2015
- Listen, English translation of poems by Lin Ming-Li, The Liberal Arts Press, Taipei, 2018
- Cézanne's Still Life and Other Poems, English/Italian, (Italian translator: Giovanni Campisi), Edizioni Universum, Trento, Italy, 2018
- Portrait and Other Poems, English/Italian, (Italian translator: Giovanni Campisi), Edizioni Universum, Trento, Italy, 2019
- Selected Chinese/English Poems of William Marr, The Earth Culture Press, China, 2021
- BEYOND ALL COLORS, Poems by Xiaohong, Paintings by William Marr, translations by Denis Mair, I WING PRESS, 2021
- A DREAMLESS NIGHT, the Selected Chinese/English Poems of William Marr, Chicago Academic Press, 2021
- EVERY DAY A BLUE SKY, Humorous and Satirical Poetry of William Marr, Washington Writers Press, 2021
- THE HOMESICK DRUNK, selected poems of William Marr, Korean translations by Hong Junzhi/Jiang Meihua, New Century Press, 2021
- Penetrating Time and Space, A Poetry Group of William Marr, ed. by Bing Hua & Xiaohong, Washington Writers Press, Jan. 2022
