= Valve seat =

Internal combustion engine component

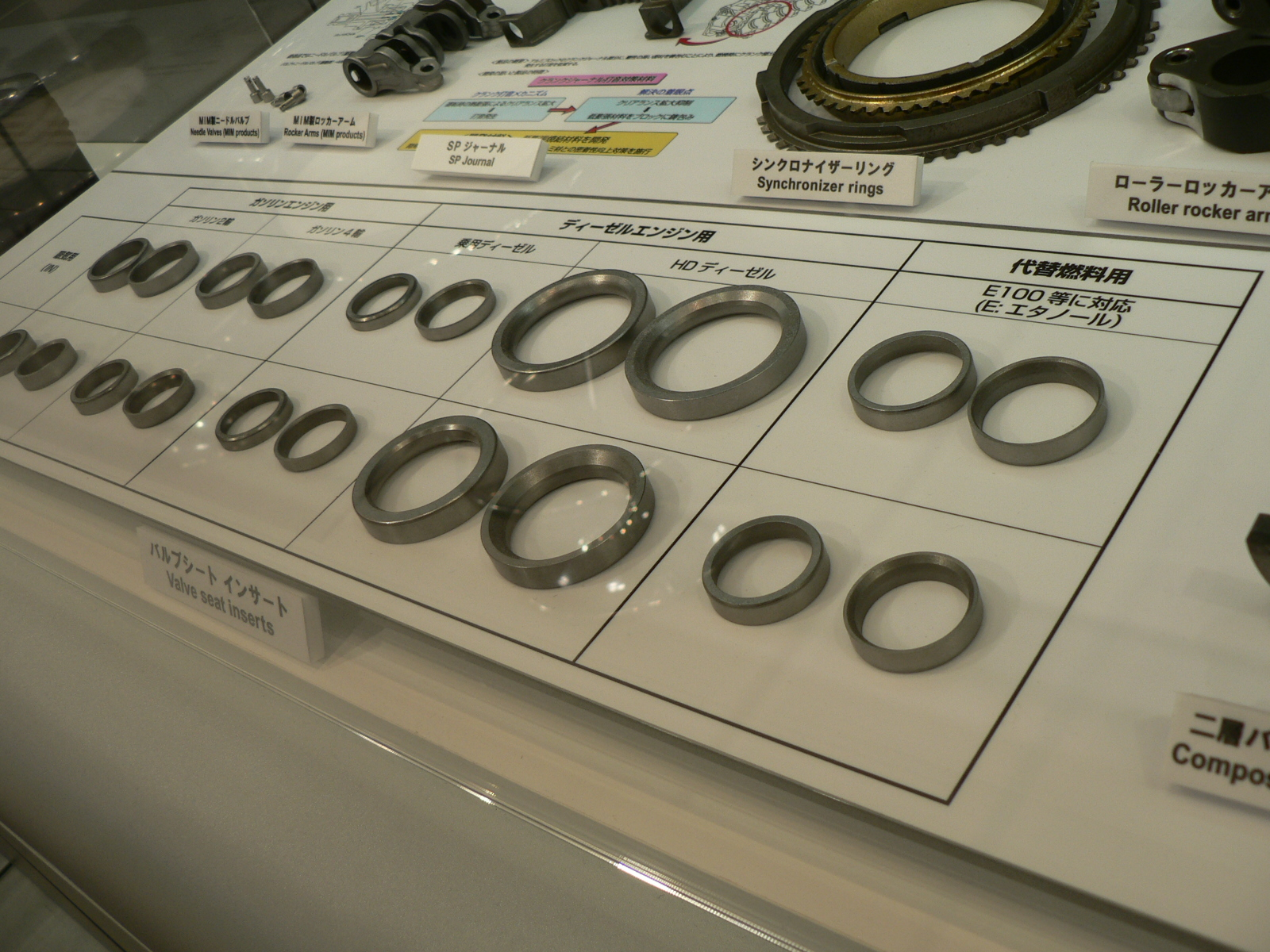
Valve seats in exhibition.

The valve seat in an internal combustion gasoline or diesel engine is the surface against which an intake or an exhaust valve rests during the portion of the engine operating cycle when that valve is closed. The valve seat is a critical component of an engine in that if it is improperly positioned, oriented, or formed during manufacture, valve leakage will occur which will adversely affect the engine compression ratio and therefore the engine efficiency, performance (engine power and engine torque), exhaust emissions, and engine life.

Valve seats are often formed by first press-fitting an approximately cylindrical piece of a hardened metal alloy, such as Stellite or inconel, into a cast depression in a cylinder head above each eventual valve stem position, and then machining a conical-section surface into the valve seat that will mate with a corresponding conical section of the corresponding valve. Generally two conical-section surfaces, one with a wider cone angle and one with a narrower cone-angle, are machined above and below the actual mating surface, to form the mating surface to the proper width (called "narrowing" the seat), and to enable it to be properly located with respect to the (wider) mating surface of the valve, so as to provide good sealing and heat transfer, when the valve is closed, and to provide good gas-flow characteristics through the valve, when it is opened.

Inexpensive engines may have valve seats that are simply cut into the material of the cylinder head or engine block (depending on the design of the engine). Some newer engines have seats that are sprayed on rather than being pressed into the head, allowing them to be thinner, creating more efficient transfer of heat through the valve seats, and enabling the valve stems to function at a lower temperature, thus allowing the valve stems (and other parts of the valvetrain) to be thinner and lighter. These valve seats are also known as laser-clad valve seats.

There are several ways in which a valve seat may be improperly positioned or machined. These include incomplete seating during the press-fitting step, distortion of the nominally circular valve seat surfaces such that they deviate unacceptably from perfect roundness or waviness, tilt of the machined surfaces relative to the valve guide hole axis, deviation of the valve seat surfaces from concentricity with the valve guide holes, and deviation of the machined conical section of the valve seat from the cone angle that is required to match the valve surface. Automated quality control of inserted and machined valve seats was historically very difficult to achieve until the advent of digital holography, which has enabled high-definition metrology for measuring all of these listed deviations.
