= Jonathan Unger =

Australian sinologist

Professor Jonathan Unger (born 1946) is a journalist and an expert on China. His major works include The Transformation of Rural China and The Nature of Chinese Politics from Mao to Jiang (as editor). Unger is currently conducting research on Chinese state-owned factories. He was editor and co-editor of The China Journal from July 1987 until July 2005.

== Research interests ==
Social stratification in China; rural Chinese social and economic change; workers and factory life; Chinese nationalism.

== Key publications ==
- Education Under Mao: Class and Competition in Canton Schools, Columbia University Press, 1982.
- (co-author) Chen Village Under Mao and Deng, University of California Press, 1992.
- (ed.) Chinese Nationalism. Armonk, M.E. Sharpe, 1996.
- The Transformation of Rural China. Armonk, M.E. Sharpe, 2002.

== Career highlights ==
Academic staff member of the Institute of Development Studies, University of Kansas; University of Washington and Leiden University before coming to Australian National University
