= Mar (surname) =

Origin
- Origin: Chinese, Scottish
- Meaning: Chinese: "horse"; Scottish: Marr, Aberdeenshire

Other names
- Variant forms: Chinese: Ma, Mah, Maa Mạc, Marr; Scottish: Marr

Mar is a Chinese and Scottish surname.

== Origins ==
Mar may be a variant spelling of:

- Mǎ (馬), a Chinese surname meaning "horse"
- Marr, a Scottish surname that originated as a habitational surname, from Marr in Aberdeenshire

== Statistics ==
According to statistics cited by Patrick Hanks, as of 2011 there were 81 people on the island of Great Britain and one on the island of Ireland with the surname Mar. In 1881 there had been 54 people with the surname in Great Britain.

The 2010 United States census found 5,375 people with the surname Mar, making it the 6,342nd-most-common name in the country. This represented an increase from 4,327 (7,120th-most-common) in the 2000 Census. In the 2010 census, about 13% of bearers of the surname identified as White, 49% as Asian, and 30% as Hispanic.

== Notable people ==
- Alex Mar, American writer of Cuban and Greek descent
- Anna Mar (1887–1917), Russian screenwriter, playwright, novelist, and journalist
- Curtis Mar (born 1967), Fijian lawn bowler
- Eric Mar (born 1962), American politician of Chinese descent
- Gary Mar (born 1962), Canadian businessman of Chinese descent
- Gary R. Mar, American philosopher
- Gordon Mar, 21st-century American politician from San Francisco
- Halldor Mar, Icelandic songwriter
- Karmen Mar (born 1987), Slovenian chess player
- Kathy Mar (born 1951), American guitarist
- Marcela Mar (born Marcela Gardeazabal Martínez, 1979), Colombian actress
- Sabrina Mar (born c. 1970), American gymnast of Chinese descent
