= Valve guide =

Combustion engine component

Valve guides are cylindrical metal bushes, pressed or integrally cast into the cylinder head of most types of reciprocating engines, to support the inlet valve and exhaust valve stems. So that they may make proper contact with its valve seat. Along with a corresponding valve spring, they are one component of an engine’s valve train.

Guides also serve to conduct heat from the combustion process out from the exhaust valve and into the cylinder head where it may be taken up by the cooling system. Bronze is commonly used, as are various iron alloys; a balance between stiffness and wear on the valve is essential to achieve a useful service life. Powder metallurgy materials are also commonly used in the manufacture of valve guides, which have the advantages of flexible material composition and the self-lubricating properties.

The clearance between the inner diameter of the valve guide and the outer diameter of the poppet valve stem is critical for the proper performance of an engine. If there is too little clearance, the valve may stick as oil contaminants and thermal expansion become factors. If there is too much clearance, the valve may not seat properly and excessive oil consumption can occur.

== Oil seal ==
The upper part of the valve stem, within the rocker box, is lubricated by oil. If this oil travels unchecked along the valve stem, engine HC emissions will become excessive. To control this, an elastomeric seal is fitted over the top of the valve guide. These may wear or stiffen with age, so are usually replaced whenever valves are removed for servicing.

== Wear ==
Over time, the inner diameter of the valve guide and the outer diameter of the valve stem may become worn. Moreover, the valve guide is exposed to high temperatures during operation, which can reduce its hardness and, consequently, lead to deformation under stress.

=== Reaming ===
In the 1980s, many U.S. production engine remanufacturers began reaming valve guides, rather than replacing them, as part of their remanufacturing process. They found that by reaming all the valve guides in a head to one standard size (typically 0.008 in. diametrically oversized), and installing remanufactured engine valves having stems that are also oversized, a typical engine head can be remanufactured in much less time. Since the reaming process leaves the valve guide with a much better surface finish and shape than typical replacement guides, and since the oversize valves often have chrome plated stems, remanufacturers also discovered that valve train warranty issues are virtually eliminated.

=== Replacement ===
Valve guides are typically shaped in a tube with a flare at one end. Their replacement involves removing the worn part by driving it out with a hammer and specifically-shaped punch. Installation may involve shrink-fitting, heating the cylinder head and cooling the valve guide so as to ease insertion, then driving the new guide in quickly with a press or a hammer. Once the parts return to room temperature the new valve guide will be solidly in place and ready to be reamed and honed to proper diameter.
