= Lamarre =

Lamarre is a French Canadian family name derived from the residents of La Mare. Notable people with the surname include:

- Ryan LaMarre, American baseball player
- Daniel Lamarre, president and COO of Cirque du Soleil
- Jacques Lamarre, CEO of SNC-Lavalin
- Lucie Lamarre, Canadian judge
- Whynter Lamarre, Canadian water polo player
- Yvon Lamarre, Canadian politician from Quebec
