= Walter Lorenzo Marr =

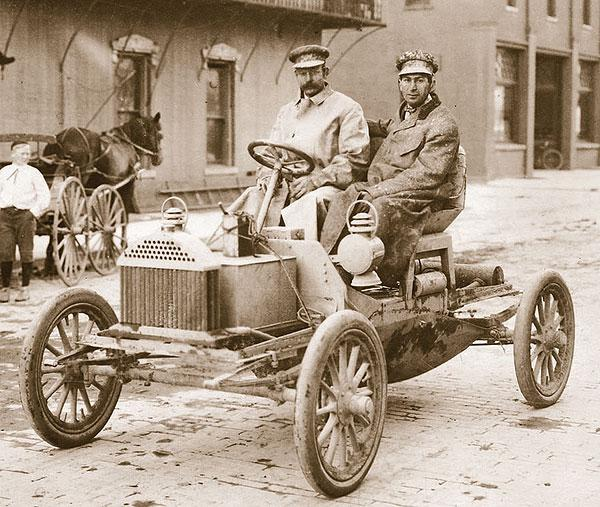
- Walter Marr and Tom Buick (David Buick's son) on a prototype 1904 Buick Model B.
- Born: August 14, 1865; Lexington, Michigan
- Died: December 11, 1941 (aged 76)
- Occupation: Automotive engineer
- Employer: Buick among others
- Children: Walter Durant Marr

Walter Lorenzo Marr (1865-1941) was an automotive pioneer and engineer who worked with David Dunbar Buick perfecting the first Buick production automobiles. He worked with Buick a number of times around the turn of the century, building Buick's first two one-off vehicles. He was the Buick Motor Company's first chief engineer from 1904 through 1918, staying on as consulting engineer until 1923. He was also the founder of the Marr Auto Car Company in 1903 which produced the Marr Auto Car. The Marr Auto Car was one of the world's first automobiles with an overhead camshaft (OHC) engine.

Possibly his most important achievement was building one of the first overhead valve engines (OHV). This he did in 1898 when he built a trike that weighed 118 pounds, and whose single cylinder had a bore and stroke of 3 inches each. He brought the concept of the overhead valve engine with him to Buick in 1901, where the invention was patented to Buick's chief engineer Eugene Richard in 1904 (applied 1902).

Marr also built a prototype Cyclecar in 1915 which was very narrow seating the passenger behind the driver. The car never made it to production, but the original prototype still exists today.

His papers are archived at Kettering University.

He had a cottage in Signal Mountain, Tennessee where he also built a large home in which to retire.
