= Marr (automobile) =

Defunct American motor vehicle manufacturer

Marr Auto-Car Company
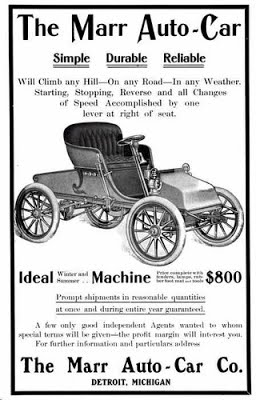
- The 1903 Marr Auto-Car

Overview
- Manufacturer: Fauber Manufacturing Company
- Production: 1902–1904
- Assembly: Elgin, Illinois
- Designer: Walter Lorenzo Marr

Body and chassis
- Body style: Runabout

Powertrain
- Engine: Single-cylinder engine
- Power output: 6.5-hp
- Transmission: planetary

Dimensions
- Wheelbase: 66-inches

The Marr Auto-Car was an automobile built in Elgin, Illinois by the Marr Auto-Car Company from 1902 to 1904.

== History ==
The car was designed by early automobile pioneer Walter L. Marr who had worked as an engine designer for Buick in 1901 and went on to be Chief Engineer there from 1904 to 1918.

The Marr was a two-seat runabout with a single-cylinder 1.7L engine that was mounted under the seat. The engine is one of the first known to have featured an overhead camshaft (OHC). The vehicle had the first tilt steering wheel, changeable speed gears on a planetary transmission and a revolutionary new carburetor. Factory price was $600, (equivalent to $21,500 in 2025).

The plant burned to the ground in August 1904 with 14 cars inside. Only one Marr Auto-Car is extant.
