= Hugh Lupin =

Hugh Lupin may refer to:

- Hugh Lupin the Elder (d. 1190/5), nobleman of the Kingdom of Sicily
- Hugh Lupin the Younger (fl. 1187–97), baron of the Kingdom of Sicily
