= Francesco Passalacqua =

Italian serial killer

- Born: 1968 (age 57–58); Scalea, Calabria, Italy
- Other names: "The Riviera dei Cedri Serial Killer" "The Calabria Killer"
- Convictions: Murder x4 Aggravated assault Illegal possession of weaponry Theft
- Penalty: Life imprisonment plus 24 years imprisonment (2000); 5 years imprisonment (2024)

Details
- Victims: 4
- Span of crimes: 1992–1997
- Country: Italy
- State: Calabria
- Date apprehended: September 1997
- Imprisoned at: Dozza Prison, Bologna, Metropolitan City of Bologna

Francesco Passalacqua (born 1968), known as The Riviera dei Cedri Serial Killer (Italian: Serial killer della Riviera dei Cedri), is an Italian serial killer who murdered four men in rural Cosenza from 1992 to 1997. Convicted for these crimes, he was sentenced to life imprisonment plus 24 years imprisonment.

In 2021, he was granted parole, but was re-arrested for an attempted murder three years later and returned to prison.

== Early life ==
Born in Scalea in 1968, Passalacqua is the third of six siblings and grew up in a very poor peasant family. His childhood was troubled due to the death of his mother, and at around the age of 20, Passalacqua began committing thefts and assaulting people.

Sometime in the early 1990s, Passalacqua married a 19-year-old local woman, who would later aid investigators during investigations into his murders.

== Murders ==
=== Mario Montaspro ===
On 3 April 1992, Passalacqua and a 16-year-old acquaintance were invited to have dinner with 45-year-old truck driver Mario Montaspro at his house in Scalea. The pair noticed that the man had a lot of money, deciding to rob him later on in the night. To do so, they left the front door slightly ajar after leaving, and then returned near midnight.

By that time, Montaspro was asleep – using this to their advantage, Passalacqua and the accomplice dropped a concrete block on the man's head, killing him in the process. They then searched for the money, but as they were unable to find it, they instead stole a few chains and watches.

Montaspro's body was found on the following day by the cleaning lady, who had been asked to check on the man at the behest of Montaspro's sister, Maria. After finding the body, she immediately alerted the authorities, who quickly identified Passalacqua and the teenage boy as the prime suspects thanks to the detailed witness accounts of several people who had seen them enter the house.

Soon afterwards, arrest warrants were issued for both of the perpetrators, who were both arrested in the countryside while attempting to sell the stolen goods. Passalacqua was found to be carrying one of the chains and watches on his person.

Following his arrest, he was kept in a detention center for several years, but was eventually released, as investigators failed to gather sufficient evidence.

=== Move to Verbicaro and further murders ===
Some time after this ordeal, Passalacqua moved to the small town of Verbicaro, where he had acquired multiple houses and cellars by unknown means. Local villagers were wary of him due to his imposing presence and insistence on staring at people for no apparent reason. News outlets would later report that in the midst of the murders, Passalacqua would intentionally attend rallies and vocally voice his support for measures the mayor had taken to apprehend the killer, seemingly out of apparent amusement.

On 16 March 1997, Passalacqua broke into the home of 59-year-old farmer Salvatore Belmonte in Santa Maria del Cedro to steal money. When he heard Belmonte re-entering the house, Passalacqua attacked him in the garden and pushed him to the ground, after which he stomped on his neck until he broke it. After killing the man, he stole 30 rabbits, a rifle, and a pistol. The sudden and violent murder quickly led to the spread of rumors amongst the villagers, who shared stories of a supposed hitman being hired by powerful people to kill vulnerable farmers.

A month later, on 16 April, a woman residing in Verbicaro found the body of her 63-year-old husband, shepherd Francesco Picarelli, inside their countryside home. An autopsy confirmed that the man had been shot in the temple and the heart, with the bullets being of a 7.65 caliber. On 28 April, another shepherd, 72-year-old Vito Michele Resia, was also murdered at his sheepfold near Verbicaro, with the killer shooting him three times in the face.

== Arrest, trial and sentence ==
In September 1997, Passalacqua was arrested for animal theft, but since they had no evidence against him at the time, the carabinieri were forced to release him. However, Assistant Prosecutor Francesco Greco noted that the detainee had repeatedly pestered his colleagues to allow him to contact his girlfriend, after which he ordered that Passalacqua's house be wiretapped.

While listening in on their conversations, investigators heard Passalacqua asking his girlfriend to retrieve his revolver and to dispose of it, all the while threatening to "kill again until the blood reaches the river". After revealing where he had hidden the gun, the carabinieri searched the house and found it, with ballistics tests confirming that it was the murder weapon.

Not long after, Passalacqua was arrested and charged with the murders, but he tried to feign ignorace, claiming that he was out shopping at the time of the murders. He was confronted on his lies by the former mayor of Verbicaro, Felice Spingola, who personally went around and asked every shopkeeper if they had seen him, to which all of them responded in the negative. Once faced with this, Passalacqua finally admitted responsibility for all the crimes, including the murder of Montaspro five years earlier. In his confession, he claimed to have gotten drunk and decided to kill Montaspro to steal his money.

Passalacqua was charged with the four murders, along with related charges of illegal possession of weaponry and theft. Prior to him being put on trial, he was forced to undergo a forensic psychiatric examination. The results indicated that while he struggled with remembering the exact events, as well as that he suffered from an antisocial personality disorder and slight mental deficiencies, Passalacqua was sane and capable of understanding the gravity of his actions.

In May 2000, he was convicted on all counts and sentenced to life imprisonment for the 1997 murders, as well as an additional 24 years imprisonment for the murder of Mario Montaspro.

=== Parole and recidivism ===
In 2021, the Genoa Surveillance Court decided to parole Passalacqua due to his reputation as a model inmate, after which he found lodging at a religious community in Vedegheto, near Vergato.

For the next three years, he lived in relative peace, but by early January 2024, local police started investigating him for supposedly setting fires in the area. On the morning of 4 January 2024, Passalacqua broke into the home of a 65-year-old farmer in the small community of Tolè. Once he came across the homeowner, he stabbed him twice in the arm and abdomen, but the injuries proved non-fatal and the victim survived.

During the scuffle, the farmer managed to snatch a chain with a crucifix from his assailant's neck – after conducting some DNA tests on it, it was matched to Francesco Passalacqua, who was listed under the heading "serial killer" in the Ministry of the Interior's logs. They then showed a picture of the man to the farmer, who immediately identified him as the attacker.

Passalacqua was arrested shortly afterwards, and whilst he initially claimed that he could not remember anything and was in a state of confusion, he later admitted to attacking the elderly man. Charged with attempted murder, Passalacqua later claimed that he never intended to harm the man but to simply "scare" him for supposedly arguing with an acquaintance of his. This explanation was not taken seriously, and in October 2024, Passalacqua was convicted of aggravated assault and sentenced to an additional 5 years imprisonment.

As of March 2025, Passalacqua is incarcerated at the Dozza Prison in Bologna.

== See also ==
- List of serial killers by country
