= Laino Borgo =

- Comune
- Comune di Laino Borgo
- Location within Italy Location within Calabria
- Coordinates: 39°57′N 15°58′E
- Country: Italy
- Region: Calabria
- Province: Cosenza (CS)

Government
  - Mayor: Mariangelina Russo

Area
  - Total: 57.08 km^{2} (22.04 sq mi)
- Elevation: 271 m (889 ft)

Population (31 August 2017)
  - Total: 1,879
  - Density: 32.92/km^{2} (85.26/sq mi)
- Demonym: Lainesi
- Time zone: UTC+1 (CET)
  - Summer (DST): UTC+2 (CEST)
- Postal code: 87014
- Dialing code: 0981
- ISTAT code: 078063
- Patron saint: Beato Pietro Paolo Navarro
- Saint day: 7 July
- Website: Official website

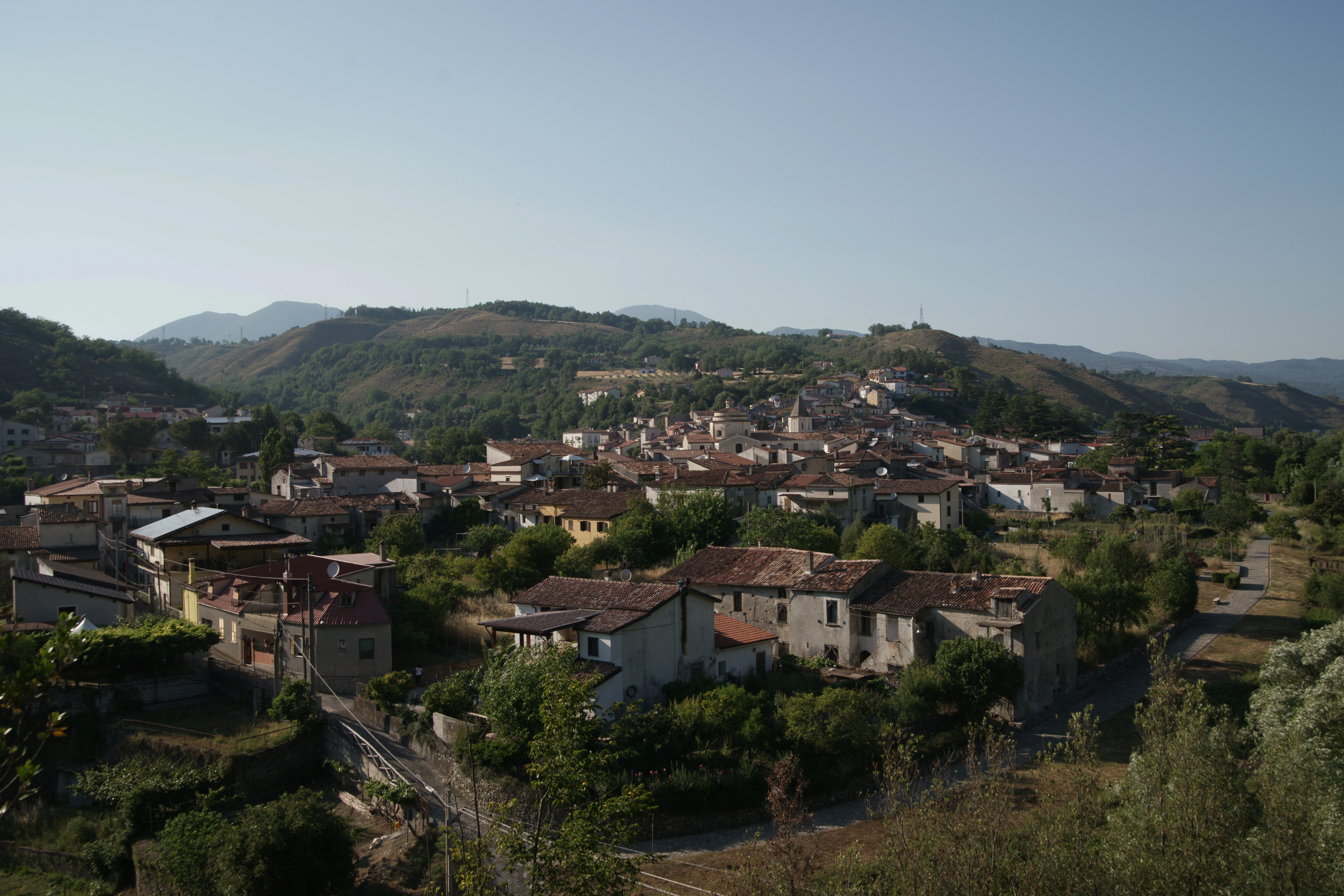
View of Laino Borgo

Laino Borgo (Calabrian: Laìnu) is a town and comune of 1,879 inhabitants in the province of Cosenza in the Calabria region of southern Italy. It is located on the border between two regions (Calabria e Basilicata), and lies at the entrance to the Pollino National Park, Italy's largest national park and an area of importance for its geology and biodiversity, recognized as a UNESCO Geopark since 2015.

== Origin of the name ==
The name of the town comes from the river Lao (Italian river), originating as Lainos, or "from the river Lao" which originally referred to the name of the ancient Greek city of Laüs. In the past, during a period in which it was joined with Laino Castello, it was also known as Laino Bruzio.

== History ==
Until recently the actual ancient Greek city of Laüs was thought to lie further down the river valley, close to where the river Lao reaches the sea at Santa Maria del Cedro. However, recent excavations at San Primo, a district of Laino Borgo, have uncovered the remains of an extensive settlement covering at least 40 hectares and dating back to around 500 B.C., which may have been the original location of the city of Laüs. It is thought that the inhabitants may have moved to the second location of Laus near Santa Maria del Cedro after the original city near Laino Borgo was destroyed in an earthquake.

== Entertainment and Culture ==
Numerous important cultural events are held throughout the year in Laino Borgo. Amongst the most significant are the following:

=== The Passion of Christ (La Giudaica) ===
On Good Friday the representation of the Passion of Christ is celebrated. This is the most important event of its kind in Calabria. The performance, normally involving over 100 of the local inhabitants dressed in period costume at numerous locations set up throughout the town, lasts throughout the entire day, culminating in a re-enactment of the crucifixion, and is called in Italian "La Giudaica". The script is based on a text written by an anonymous author during the 17th century. The first recorded performance was on April 20, 1832, and it has been performed regularly ever since, normally taking place every second year. Spectators can follow the performance on foot as it moves through the town.

=== The Feast of the Madonna of the Chapels ===
The Feast of the Madonna of the Chapels is celebrated on the third Sunday of September in a procession dedicated to the Madonna of the Chapels, also known as the Fainting Virgin Mary (see also Swoon of the Virgin). The event has its origins in the 1700s and participants following behind the statue of the Virgin Mary carry elaborate displays of flowers and candles on their heads and are accompanied by traditional music.

== Sport ==
Lying on the river Lao, just above a series of gorges and canyons where the river enters a series of rapids, Laino Borgo has become the main centre of canoeing and river rafting in Southern Italy. It hosts regular whitewater rafting events, and since the 1990s has emerged as a significant whitewater rafting tourism destination providing an important contribution to the local economy.

== See also ==
- Laino Castello
- Lao (Italian river)
- Laüs
- Santuario delle Cappelle
- Terremoto del Pollino del 2012
