= Hugh Lupin the Elder =

Hugh Lupin (Latin: Hugo Lupinus; died 1190/5), called the Elder or Hugh I, was a nobleman of the Kingdom of Sicily. He was the count of Catanzaro (Note: Latin: comes Catacensis) from 1167 until his death.

On the occasion of Hugh's creation as a count in the spring of 1167, the chronicler pseudo-Falcandus notes that he was "a man expert in every virtue who had recently arrived from France". (Note: Latin: hominem omnis virtutis expertem, qui de Francia nuper advenerat) He mentions that he was a cousin (or relative) of the queen-mother Margaret, then acting as regent for her son, William II, and of the chancellor, Stephen du Perche. Either shortly before or after he was invested with Catanzaro, Hugh married Clementia, the heiress of the last count, Raymond. The couple had twin sons: Hugh the Younger and Jordan.

In 1169, Hugh was with his cousin Stephen when the group was violently attacked and forced to take refuge in a church in Palermo. Stephen negotiated his release by resigning his chancellorship and going into exile, while the rebels allowed Hugh to stay on in Sicily. It was thought that Hugh would not pose a danger to the rebels—described by pseudo-Falcandus as "the great men of the court" (Note: Latin: magnates curie)—and would ease the queen's anger.

By February 1168 at the latest, Hugh had been appointed master justiciar and master constable of all Calabria, the Val di Crati, Valsinni and the Valle del Mercure. (Note: Latin: magister justiciarius et magister comestabulus totius Calabrie et Vallis Gratis et Vallis Signi et Vallis Laini; the Vallis Laini includes Laino Borgo and Laino Castello.) It is not known how long he held this office, because there is no surviving source mentioning it between 1168 and December 1194.

In February 1177, Hugh was one of the barons, churchmen and high officials present as witnesses when William II granted a dower to his queen, Joanna of England.

Hugh was still living in November 1190, but he had died by April 1195. He was succeeded in Catanzaro by his eldest son Hugh.
