= Lao (Italian river) =

Lao Mercure
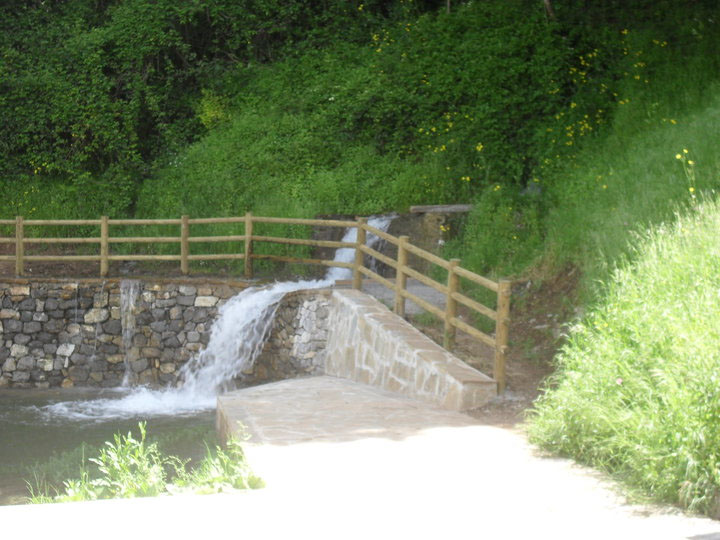

Location
- Country: Italy

Physical characteristics
- Source: Serra del Prete
  - location: Pollino massif, Basilicata
  - coordinates: 39°58′13″N 16°8′42″E
  - elevation: 2,181 m (7,156 ft)
- Mouth: Tyrrhenian Sea
  - location: Scalea, Calabria
  - coordinates: 39°46′36″N 15°47′39″E
  - elevation: 0 m (0 ft)
- Length: 51 km (32 mi)
- Basin size: 594 km^{2} (229 sq mi)
- Discharge
  - average: 12.1 m^{3}/s (430 cu ft/s)

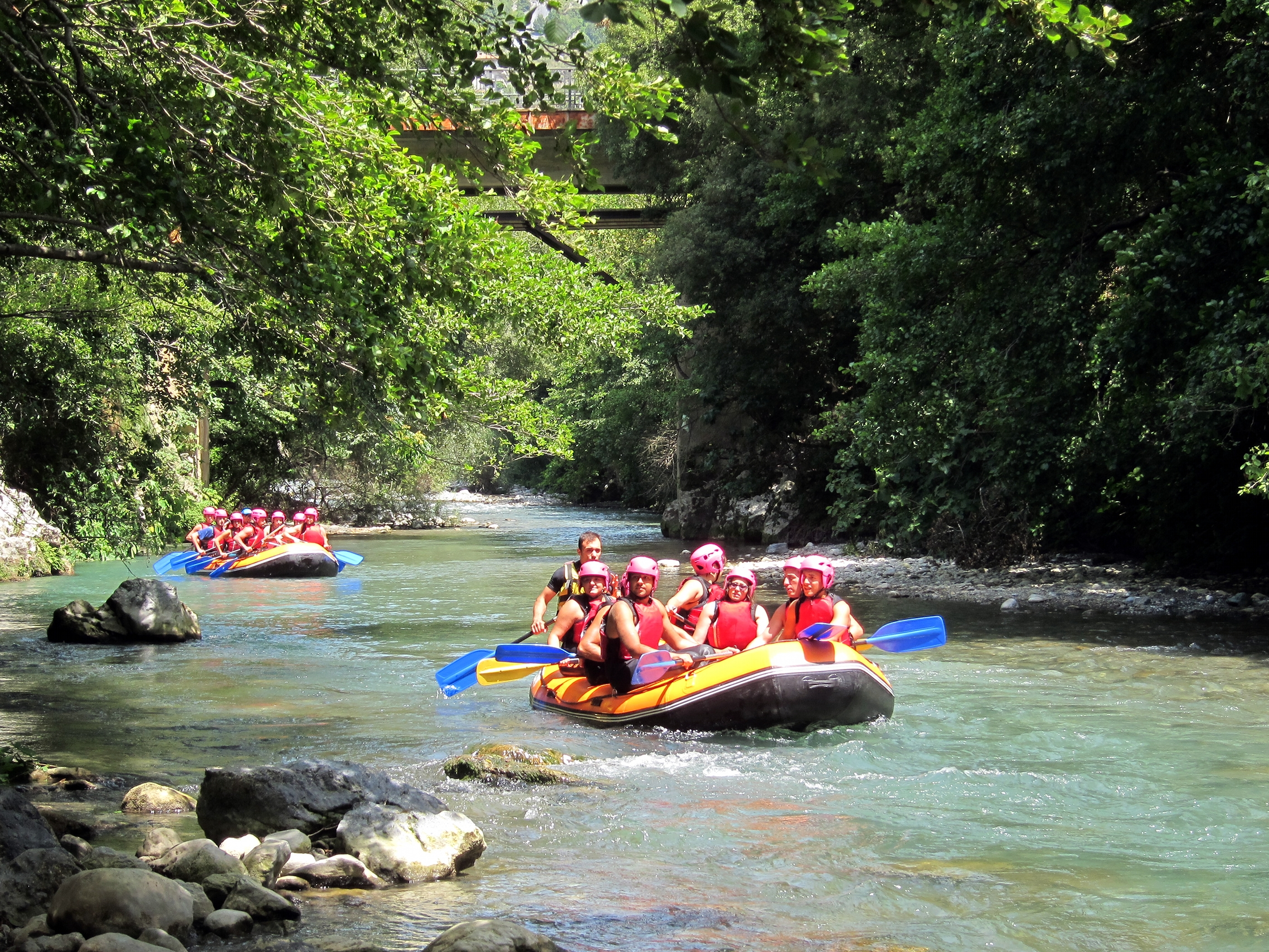
Rafting on the Lao near Papasidero

The Lao (Greek: Λᾶος; Latin: Laus, Laos or Laüs; formerly also Laino) is a river in southern Italy. It rises in the Lucanian Apennines in Basilicata (where it is known as the Mercure) and drains into the Tyrrhenian Sea near Scalea in Calabria.

== Description ==
The river has a length of 51 km. Its source is near the Serra del Prete mountain in the Pollino massif, at an altitude of 2,181 meters. Here it flows to the west through the Valley of Mercure and passes Viggianello. Later it changes course to southwest and passes Laino Borgo and Papasidero. Near Orsomarso it is joined by the Argentino from the left, its main tributary. It empties in the Tyrrhenian Sea near Scalea. It has a drainage basin of 594 square kilometres (229 sq mi).

== History ==
Pliny, Ptolemy and Strabo all describe the river and note that it was the boundary between Lucania and Bruttium in classical antiquity. The archaeological site of the ancient Greek colony Laüs is located close to the river's mouth in the frazione Marcellina of the comune Santa Maria del Cedro.
