= Tisia (Bruttium) =

Tisia (Ancient Greek: Τισία) was an ancient town in Bruttium. The site is unlocated.

== Second Punic War ==
Appian gives the following account of the town:

During the Second Punic War, at some point it had a Carthaginian garrison. A man from the town was in the habit of plundering and sharing his booty with the commander of the garrison. By this means he ingratiated himself with the commander and almost shared command with him. At some point, he became angry at the arrogant behavior of the Carthaginian garrison toward his country.

By an arrangement with a Roman general, he brought a few Roman soldiers into the citadel each day as prisoners and took their arms there as spoils. When he had introduced a sufficient number, he released and armed them, and they overpowered the Carthaginian garrison. After this, he brought another garrison from the Roman forces into the town.

When Hannibal passed that way not long afterward, the guards fled in terror to Rhegium and the inhabitants of Tisia delivered themselves up to Hannibal. Hannibal burned those who had been guilty of the defection and placed another garrison in the town.

== Social War ==
It was probably the same place that Diodorus Siculus refers to as Isia, which he says was unsuccessfully besieged by the leaders of the Italian forces during the Social War (91–87 BC).
