= Jordan Lupin =

First count of Bovino (died 1197)

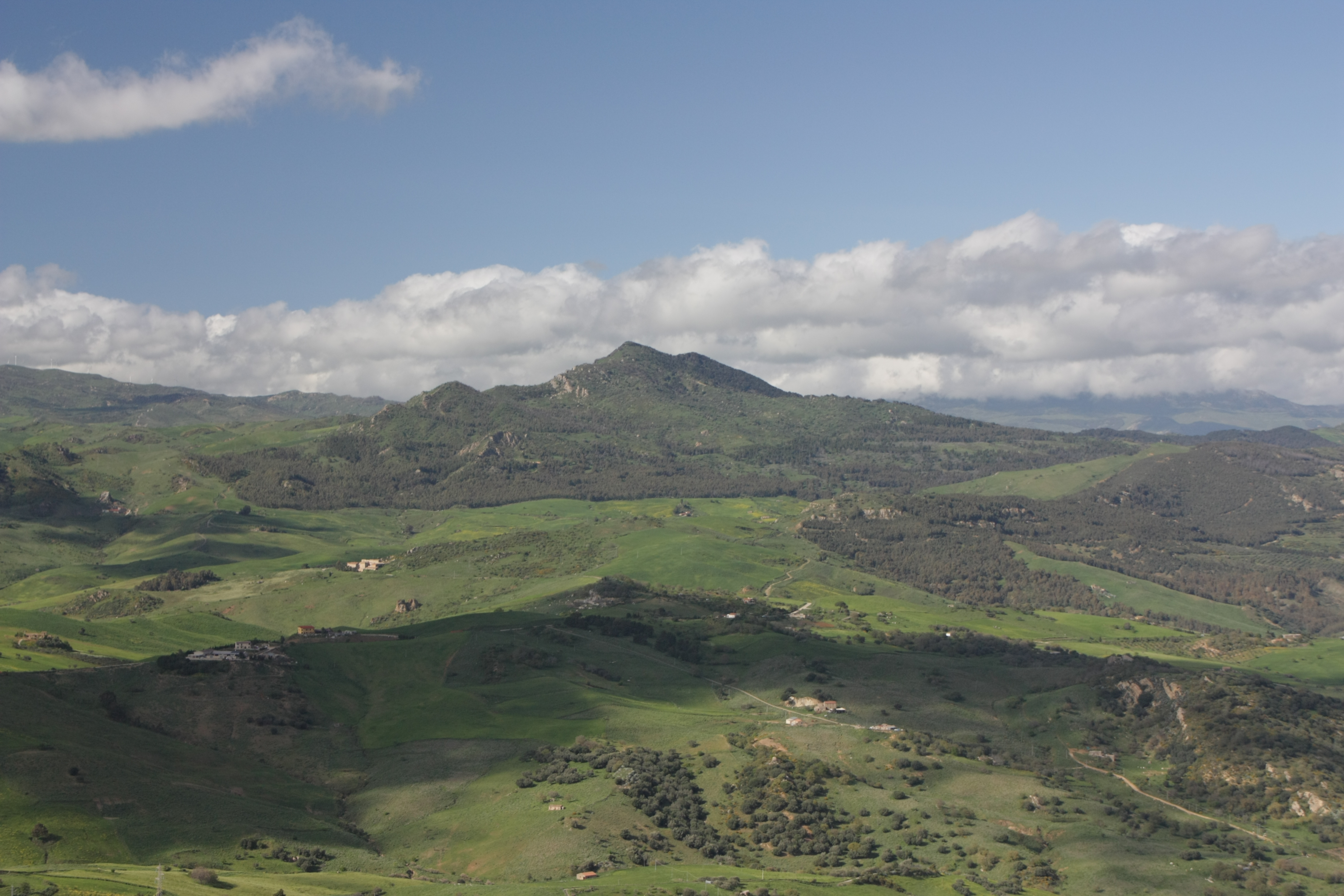
Mount Altesina (Tavis) in Sicily was at one time part of Jordan's lordship.

Jordan Lupin (Italian: Giordano Lupino; died 1197) was the first count of Bovino in the Norman kingdom of Sicily. He played a major role in the final years of Norman rule and first years of the Staufer dynasty. Twice he was involved in opposing crusader armies passing through Sicily. In the second instance, he led a revolt, apparently in the hope of seizing the throne. He was successful in attracting significant support, and was even crowned anti-king, but was ultimately captured and executed.

== Family and name ==
Jordan was a son of Count Hugh I and Countess Clementia of the county of Catanzaro. He had an elder twin brother, Count Hugh of Conversano, who later inherited Catanzaro. Jordan's surname, Lupin (Latin: Iordanus Lupinus), was shared by his father and brother. It was mangled, however, by the English chronicler Roger of Hoveden into "Jordanus de Pino" or "Jordanus del Pin", whence the French historian Ferdinand Chalandon modernised it into "Jourdain du Pin". Two manuscripts of the Itinerarium Regis Ricardi of Richard de Templo, however, correctly render it Luppin, and the Norman poet Ambroise calls him "Jordanz Lupins" in the Norman dialect.

== Governor of Bovino and Messina ==
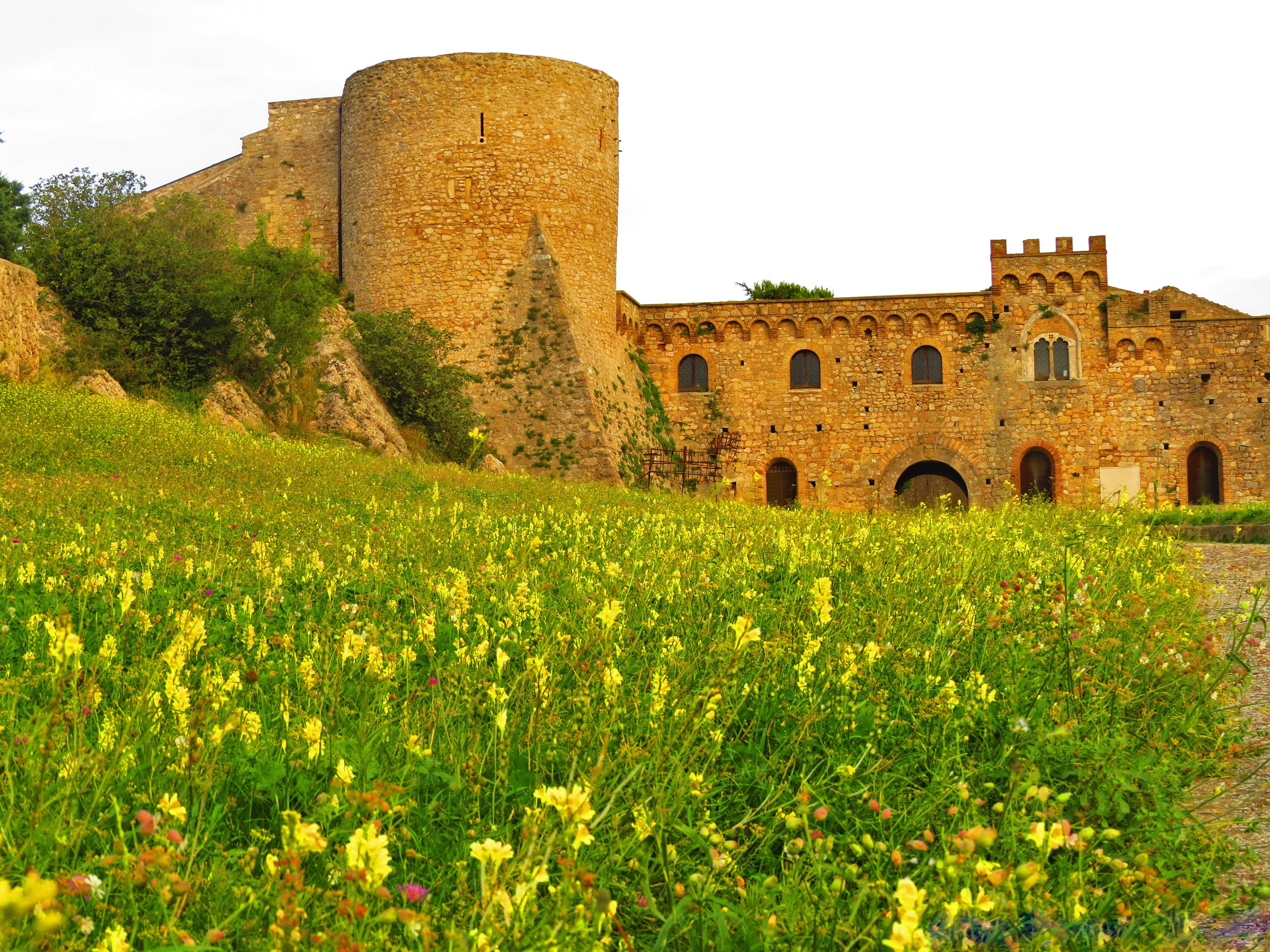
The Norman castle at Bovino, the centre of Jordan's county in mainland southern Italy.

In Palermo in May 1183, Jordan witnessed the royal diploma permitting the marriage of Roger of Tarsia and Maria, daughter of Robert Malconvenant. By the later 1180s, he was a member of the royal bodyguard. In March 1187, he was the royal seneschal (regis senescalcus) under William II. He was also the lord of Tavis, that is, the region around Mount Altesina in the Heraean Mountains of central Sicily. In the succession dispute that followed William's death in 1189, he supported Tancred, who rewarded him with the county of Bovino. This county was a new creation, having been carved out of the south of the county of Loritello. It also included Deliceto, Montellere and Monterisi. The historian Errico Cuozzo suggests that Jordan was only granted the county of Bovino as compensation for the loss of Messina.

By the autumn of 1190, Tancred had entrusted the defence of Messina to Jordan, and he was in charge when two large armies of the Third Crusade under Philip II of France and Richard I of England arrived. According to Roger of Hoveden, while Jordan and some other Sicilian leaders were meeting with Richard in the latter's lodgings on 4 October 1190, a riot broke out and the Anglo-Norman crusaders were attacked. In response, Richard stormed the city. According to both Roger of Hoveden and Ambroise, Jordan and the Sicilian admiral Margaritus had stirred up the city against the crusaders and provoked the riots. In the end, Jordan was forced to leave Messina to Richard, who was in turn forced by Philip to place it under the nominal control of the Templars and Hospitallers until Tancred paid an indemnity. According to Ralph of Diceto, Jordan and Margaritus fled the city in secret with their families.

All the Anglo-Norman writers who deal with Jordan—Roger of Hoveden, Richard de Templo and Ambroise—were writing after Tancred's death, and after Jordan had switched his support to the emperor. They universally have a negative opinion of him. They also call him a familiaris, the highest court rank, although there is no evidence Jordan held this rank.

== Rebellion and execution ==
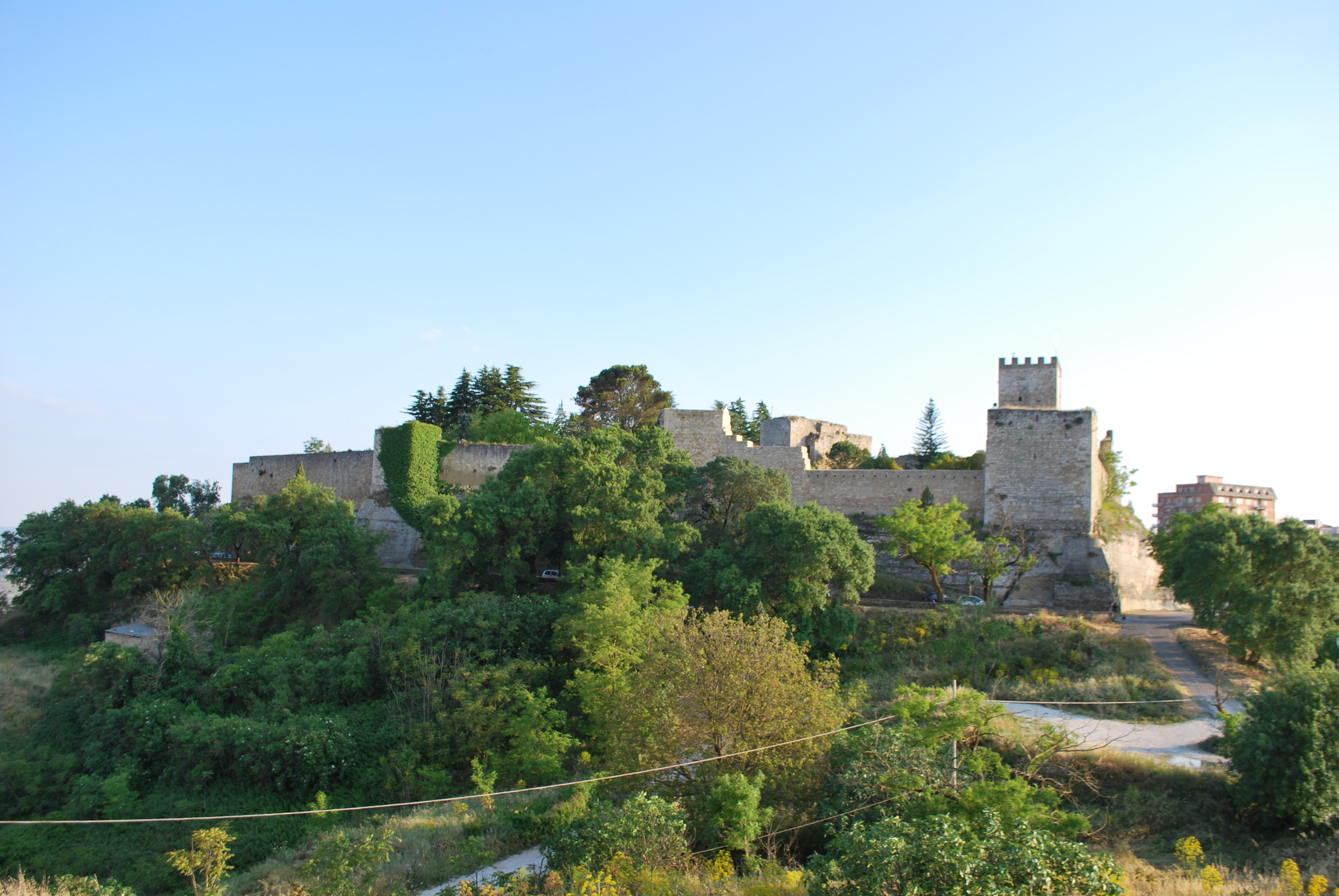
The castle of Castrogiovanni was the final stronghold of Jordan's rebellion in 1197.

After Tancred's death in 1194, the Emperor Henry VI took over Sicily in the name of his wife, Constance, daughter of Roger II. Despite having supported Tancred's claim over Constance's, Jordan and his brother supported Henry after Tancred's death and both appear to have gained Henry's trust, for they confirmed many of the emperor's Sicilian grants and privileges. Cuozzo argues that Jordan and his brother abandoned Tancred for Henry as early as the summer of 1192.

In May 1197, as Henry passed through Sicily on his way to join the German crusade, a revolt broke out. Jordan and his brother were both implicated. According to the Annales Stadenses, erroneously under the year 1196, the leader of the revolt was one "Jordanus de Sicilia". The historian Evelyn Jamison first proposed that this was Jordan Lupin, a proposal which has been widely accepted. Nevertheless, the chronicler Richard of San Germano names the castellan of Castrogiovanni as a certain William the Monk (Guilielmus monachus), and it has been argued that he was the rebel leader later executed by Henry.

Henry crushed the rebellion mercilessly, inflicting terrible vengeance on captured rebels. Jordan was a pretender to the throne at this stage, having even been crowned and having received a gift of jewels from Queen Constance, who had thrown her support to the rebels against her own husband. He was holed up in the castle of Castrogiovanni. He surrendered to Henry and was tortured and executed in June 1197 in front of the queen. According to Otto of Sankt Blasien, the emperor "ordered that a man who aspired to the royal crown [i.e. Jordan] should have a crown fixed to him by iron nails". Others indicate that he was forced to sit on a red-hot throne and that the crown nailed to his head was heated until glowing.

Following the crushing of the revolt, the county of Bovino was dissolved. Conversano and Catanzaro were confiscated from Hugh, who is never heard of again, and bestowed on Berardo Gentile and Riccardo di Fallucca, respectively. In 1201, the house formerly belonging to Jordan in Messina was granted to Anfusus de Rota.
