= Punta di Pellaro =

Punta di Pellaro (Greek: Λευκοπέτρα, "white rock"; Latin: Leucopetra) is the extreme southwestern point of mainland Italy, in the region of Calabria, looking towards the east coast of Sicily, at 38°01′N 15°38′E.

The whiteness of the rocks composing this headland gave rise to its ancient name (Λευκοπέτρα; "white rock").

Anciently a promontory of Bruttium, it was in consequence of its location generally regarded as the termination of the chain of the Apennines. Pliny tells it was some 20 km from Rhegium (modern Reggio di Calabria).

It is evidently the same promontory which is called by Thucydides Πέτρα τῆς Ῥηγίνης, and was the last point in Italy where Demosthenes and Eurymedon touched with the Athenian armament before they crossed over to Sicily.

It was here also that Cicero touched on his voyage from Sicily, when, after the death of Julius Caesar, 44 BCE, he was preparing to repair into Greece, and where he was visited by some friends from Rhegium, who brought news from Rome that induced him to alter his plans. In the former passage he terms it promontorium agri Rhegini: the Leucopetra Tarentinorum mentioned by him, if it be not a false reading, must refer to quite a different place, probably the headland of Leuca, more commonly called the Iapygian promontory.

== Sources ==
- Talbert, Richard, ed. (2000). "Map 46". Barrington Atlas of the Greek and Roman World. Princeton University Press. ISBN 978-0-691-03169-9.
- Geographic Names Information System, for coordinates
