= Scalea =

Scalea Greek: Skála
- Comune
- Comune di Scalea
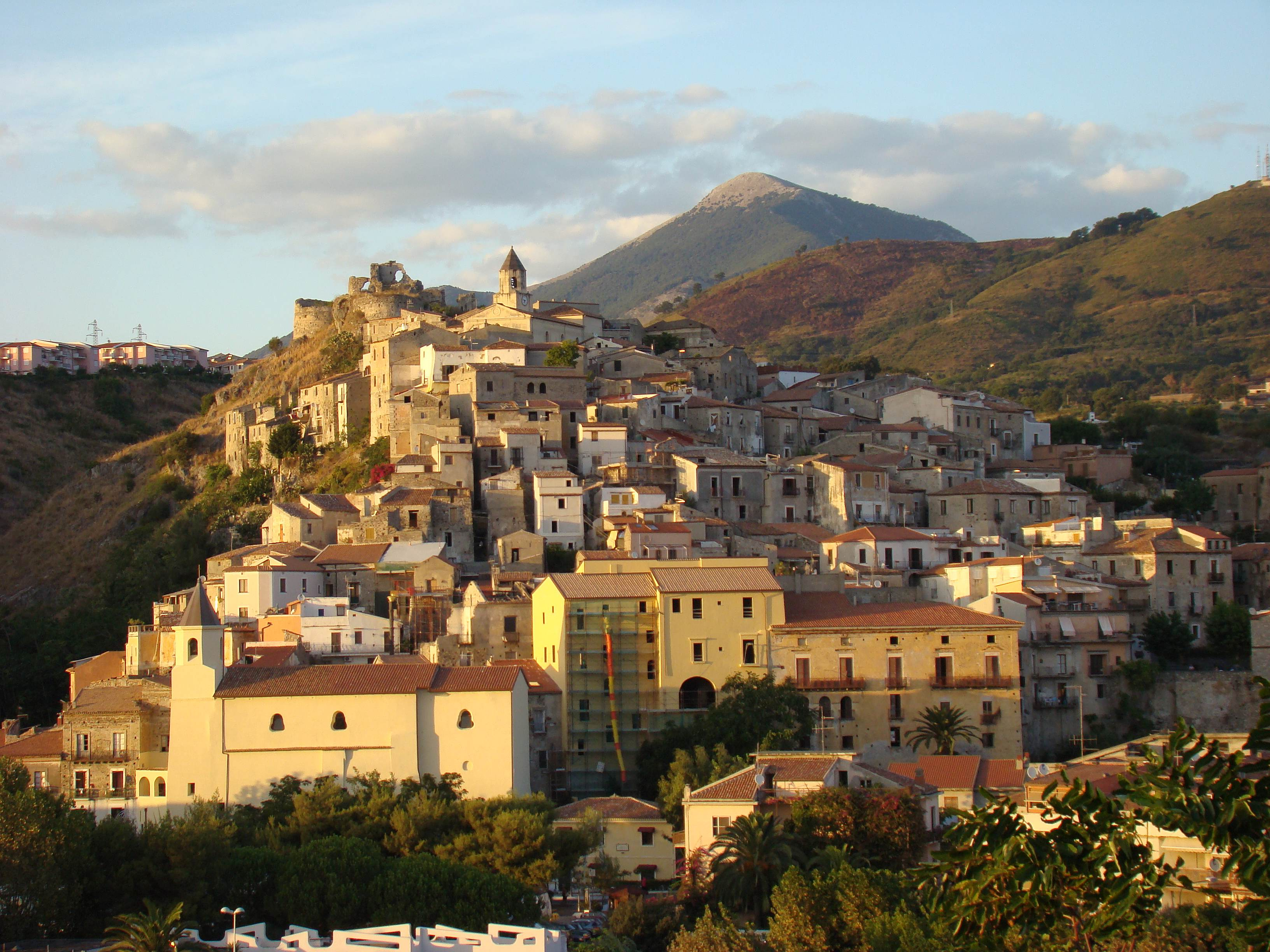

- Coat of arms

- Location within Italy Location within Calabria
- Coordinates: 39°48′53″N 15°47′26″E
- Country: Italy
- Region: Calabria
- Province: Cosenza (CS)

Government
  - Mayor: Giacomo Perrotta

Area
  - Total: 22 km^{2} (8.5 sq mi)
- Elevation: 25 m (82 ft)

Population (2007)
  - Total: 10,429
  - Density: 470/km^{2} (1,200/sq mi)
- Demonym: Scaleoti
- Time zone: UTC+1 (CET)
  - Summer (DST): UTC+2 (CEST)
- Postal code: 87029
- Dialing code: 0985
- Patron saint: Holy Virgin of Mount Carmel
- Saint day: July 16
- Website: Official website

Scalea is a town and comune in the province of Cosenza in the Calabria region of southern Italy.

The old city sits within a preserved set of ancient walls on the heights. The interior of the old city is an intricate maze of stairs, alleys, wide streets and plazas, support beams, and arches. One of the defining characteristics of the historic center is "suppuorti": wooden floors built above the alleyways, born out of the need for defensibility and for growth in dense limited space.

Since the 1960s, the beach at the base of the town was developed into a modern shopping and leisure center known as the Scalea Marina.

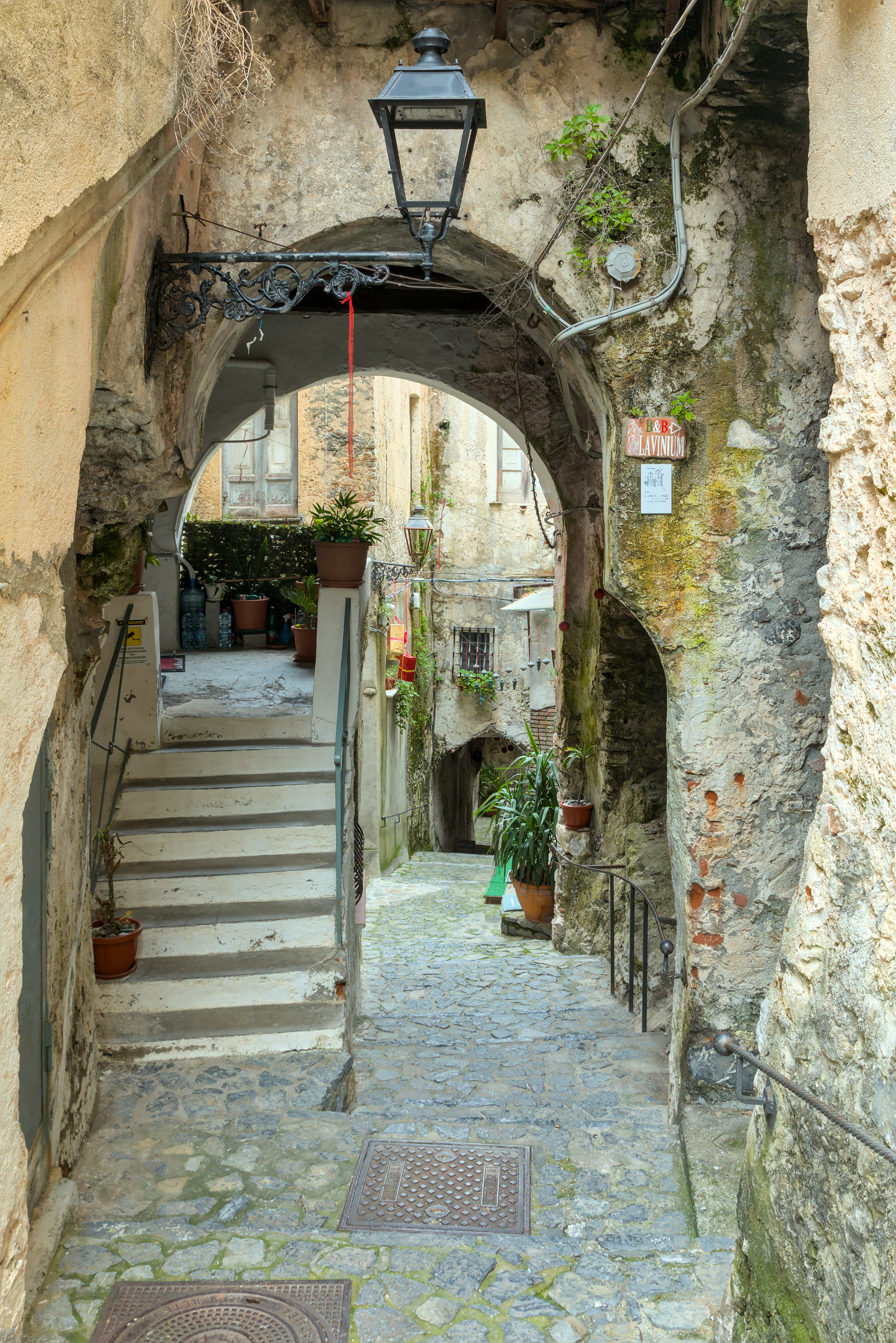
A covered stairway in the old town

== Toponymy ==
The name Scalea most likely derives from the Latin scalae, meaning “stairs” or “steps,” a reference to the terraced structure of the medieval town rising up the hillside. This topographical explanation is supported by both historical and linguistic evidence.

An alternative hypothesis links the name to the Greek word Skalía (Σκαλιά), meaning “harbor” or “landing place,” possibly recalling an ancient coastal settlement or anchorage in the area. However, most scholars consider the Latin origin more consistent with the town’s layout and early medieval development.

The earliest recorded forms, such as Scalia and de Scalis, appeared in Norman documents, and in the Catalogus Baronum in 1322. By the late Middle Ages, the spelling Scalea had become standard in royal registers and notarial records.

== History ==
Scalea is the site of one of the first human settlements in southern Italy. Excavations of the caves beneath Torre Talao have unearthed Neanderthal bones and stone tools from the Paleolithic Era, and the surrounding Lao Valley also contains evidence of small Protohistoric, Bronze, and Iron Age (approximately 10,000-7,000 B.C.E.) communities throughout.

In approximately 600 B.C.E., Greek Sybarites founded the city of Laüs along the Lao River heights in order to facilitate communications with their colony in Posidonia. Laüs is considered the antecedent of modern-day Scalea, as is the subsequent Roman colony of Lavinium. Ruins of imperial era Roman villas are scattered all throughout the surrounding plains and lowlands.

The present city of Scalea arose sometime during the Lombard-Byzantine Conflict. Towards the end of the 600s, Scalea was occupied by the Lombards and it remained their colony up until Charlemagne's conquest of Italy in the 800s. The Lombards built the city's fortress, its two gates, and many surrounding homes that linked together to function as a wall. The city's main military gate sat at the top guarded by Gastaldo Fortress, which was later converted by the Normans into a castle, additional housing, and Piazza Cimalonga. It is during this time that the city came to be known as Scalea, perhaps due to the neighborhood surrounding the castle gradually developing outwards and vertically like rungs on a ladder.

In the 700s, Scalea was home to the Anacoreti, an order of Byzantine Greek monks who lived an ascetic lifestyle in the Scalicella caves beneath the city. They would later be joined by monks who fled north during the Muslim conquest of Sicily in the 900s.

Following a rebellion against the Angevin Empire in the 1100s, the port had been converted into state-owned land with significant tax relief that greatly facilitated commercial activity. The Scalean navy took advantage of this opportunity to become one of the most renowned in Calabria, with reach all throughout the major ports of the Mediterranean. During the Norman era, Scalea hosted significant mercantile and seafaring activity, and by the beginning of the 1400s, it had become one of the most important maritime centers on the Mediterranean Sea.

During the Angevin-Aragonese Period, Scalea's population grew to over 5,000 inhabitants. However, this trend was eventually reversed by the Crusades and the bubonic plague, and the city's population was cut in half as Scaleans fled the city en masse for smaller towns in the countryside.

In the 1600s, Scaleans participated in a Calabria-wide revolt against feudalism.

In the 1700s a series of earthquakes caused significant damage to the city, and led to outbreaks of poverty, disease, and famine. A portion of the city seceded to form another town now known as Santa Domenica Talao, and by the 1800s, only a fraction of Scalea remained.

This remaining fraction, San Nicola (today the independent town of San Nicola Arcella) was pivotal to Scalea's recovery. Neapolitan geographer Lorenzo Giustiniani observed that the port of San Nicola was a major trade and production center for the Kingdom of Naples, with Scalea benefitting from its positioning between San Nicola and the Lao River. Traders from all over Italy and even places as far as England converged on the port for abundant local goods such as wheat, figs, grapes, beans, onions, wine, and the fur and meat of rabbits, foxes, and wolves.

Scalea was bombed by Allied forces during World War II. The homes comprising Scalea's historic center were gradually abandoned, with many former inhabitants moving to new developments constructed just south of Scalea throughout the 1960s.

This sprawl continued until the 1990s, when Scalea undertook a renovation plan that included building a municipal airport, a swimming pool, and a modern port near Torre Talao. However, the airport is underutilized, the pool was destroyed by strong winds within a year of its construction, and the port was never completed.

Such corruption led to Scalea coming under the scrutiny of the Plinius anti-mafia operation in 2013. 38 people including the mayor of Scalea, five city councillors, and several municipal employees were arrested and charged with maintaining political ties to the 'Ndrangheta crime family. Several more councillors resigned as a result, and the city was placed under a provisional commissioner appointed by the central government in order to continue to be able to function.

== Economy ==
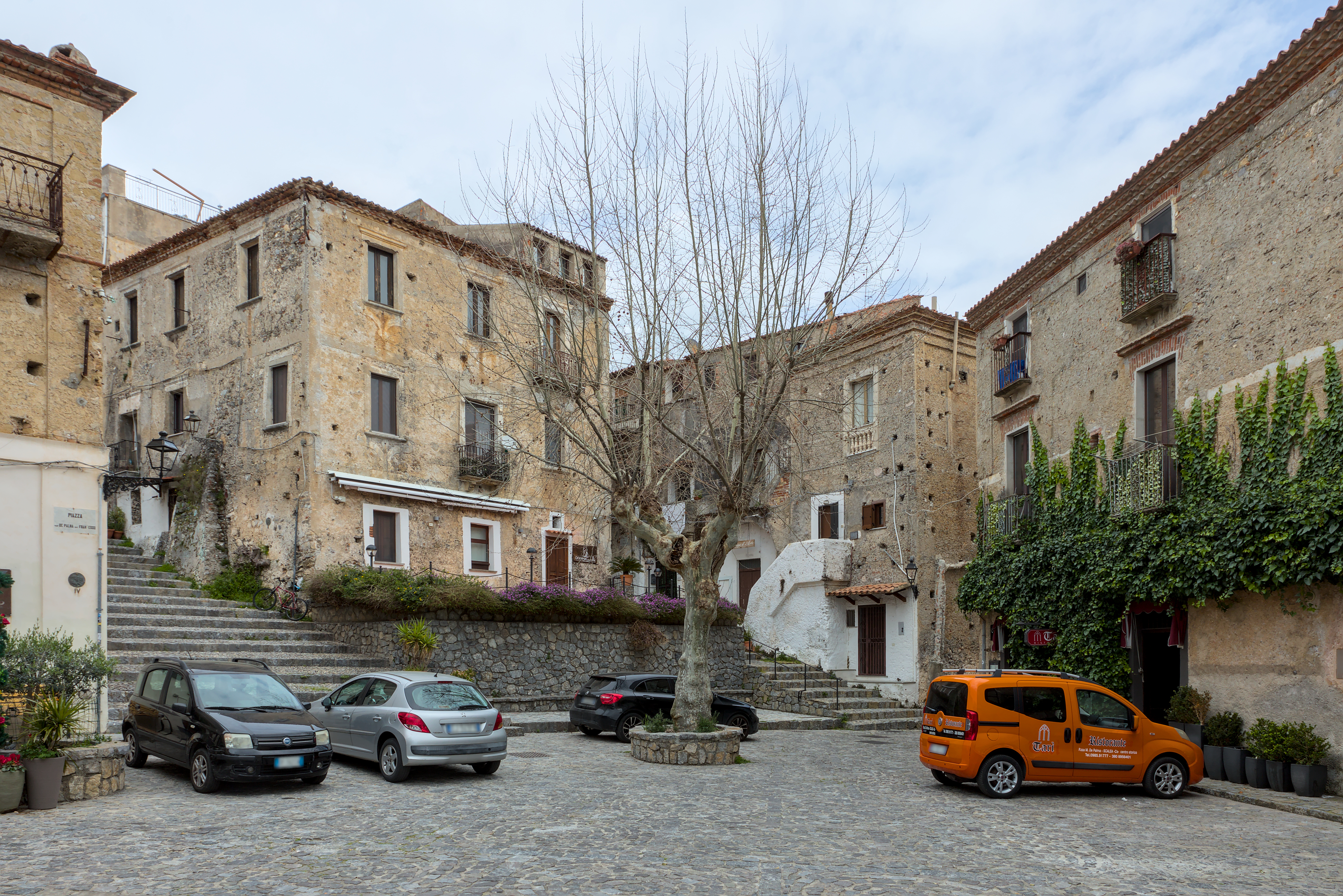
A small square in the old town.

Historically, Scalea's primary industries were agriculture and fishing, but those industries have nearly disappeared. Scalea's coastline was once used for cedar cultivation, but real estate development in the 1970s led to the sale and demolition of these lands.

Scalea's agricultural sector has had difficulty with the integration of modern processing, marketing, and distribution techniques. The municipality has struggled to expand the crop irrigation system despite its having available land and resources to do so.

Today, Scalea can be socioeconomically characterized as a subsidized consumer economy, in which the net inflow of external financial resources exceeds the productivity of the city. This lack of investment growth opportunities largely contributes to Scalea's present inability to maintain financial stability.

Since Scalea's consumption and construction are inconsistent with the city's actual economic output, Scalea's growth is a disorganized process that could be referred to as "modernization without development."

Small businesses have developed in some sectors such as construction, but the bulk of Scalea's modern economy revolves around tourism.

== Main sights ==
- Palazzo dei Principi (13th century)
- Palazzetto Normanno (12th century)
- Church of San Nicola in Plateis (originally from the 8th century, later restored).
- Torre Talao, a tower built in the 16th century, part of a system of 337 coastal towers built to deter the pirate attacks.
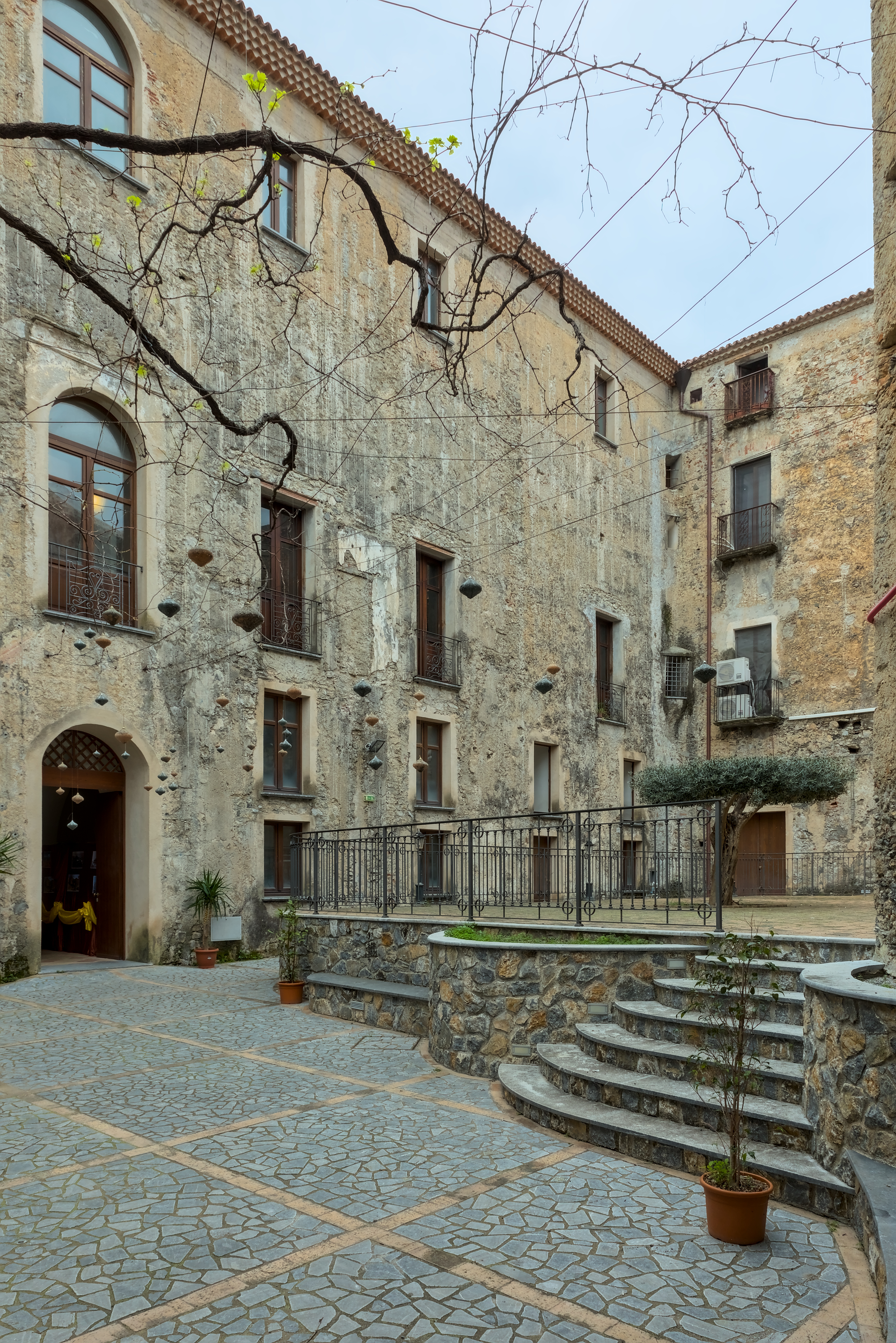
Palazzo dei Principi Spinelli

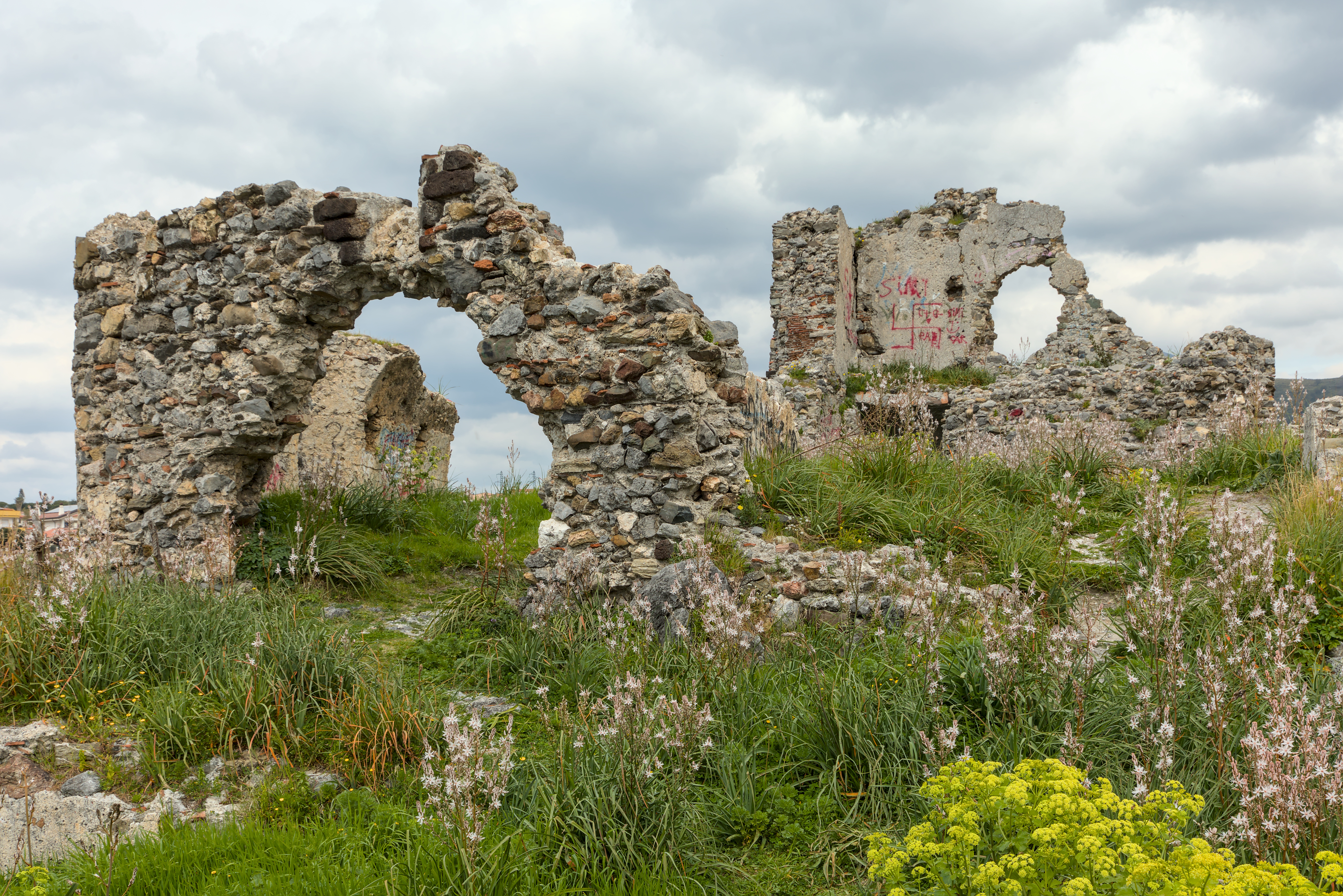
Castello Normanno

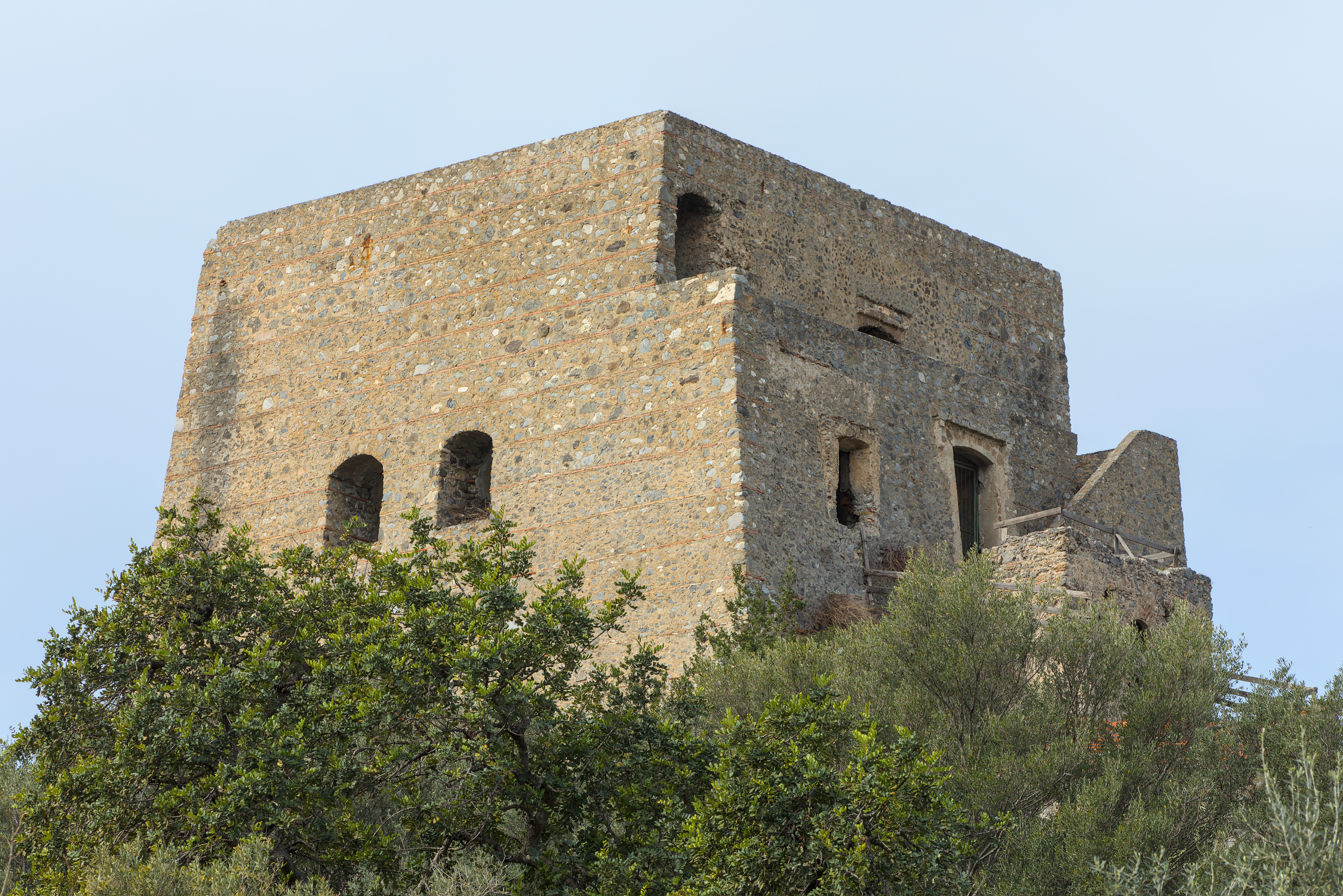
Torre Talao

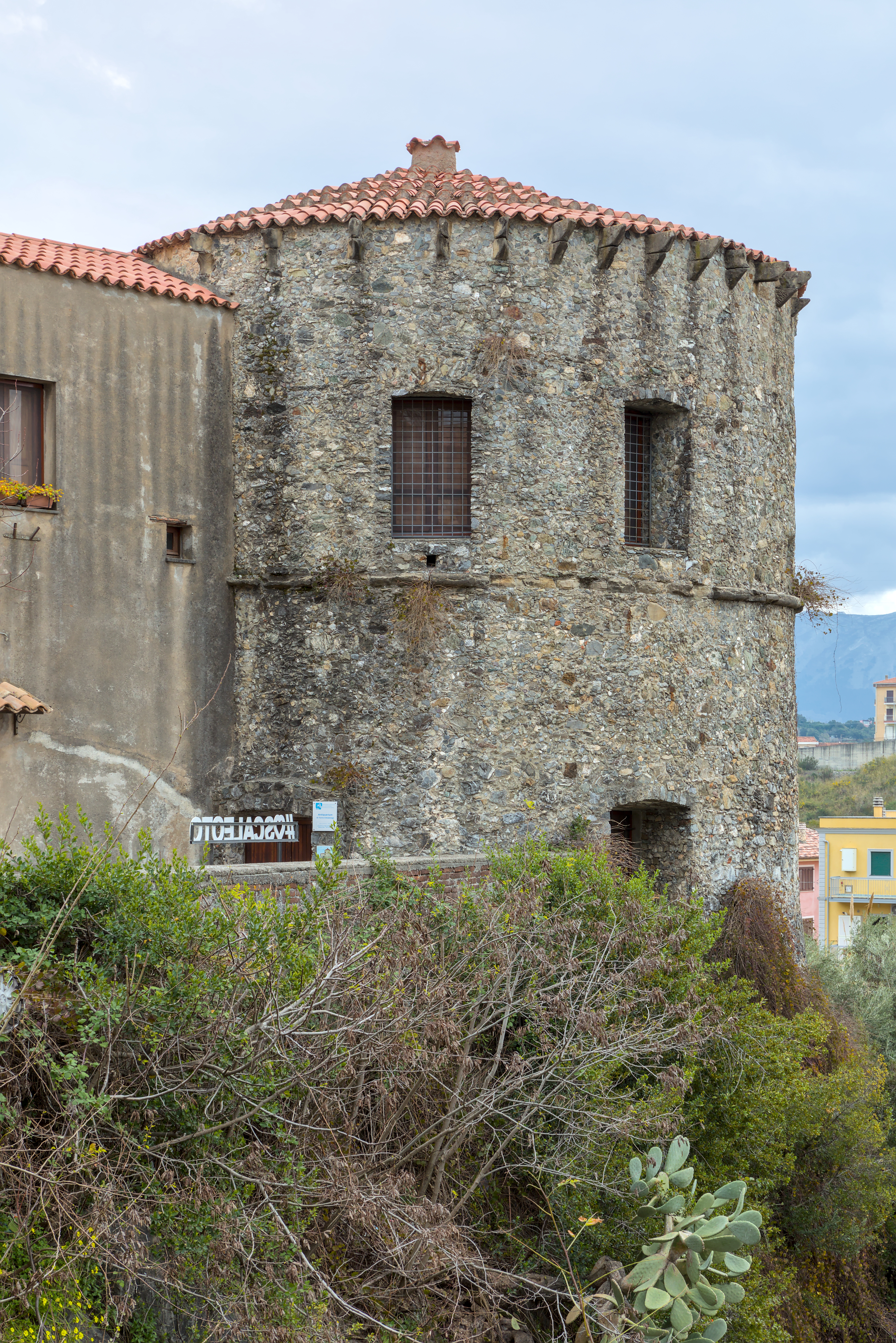
Torre Cimalonga
