= Clementia of Catanzaro =

Countess of Catanzaro (fl. 1145–1179/81)

Clementia (Note: French: Clémence, pronounced [klemɑ̃s]; Italian: Clemenza, pronounced [kleˈmɛntsa].) (fl. 1145 – 1179/81) was the ruling countess of Catanzaro in the Kingdom of Sicily. She played a major role in the baronial rebellion of 1160–1162.

Clementia was the daughter and sole heiress of Count Raymond of Catanzaro and Segelgarda (Sikilgarda; died 1167). Her father succeeded his elder brother, Geoffrey, before 1145. The earliest known account of Clementia appears in a charter issued by her paternal grandmother, Bertha, who made a donation for the salvation of her son Geoffrey in December 1145.

By early 1158, Clementia had succeeded her father as Countess of Catanzaro, though her authority was limited during her minority under the regency of her widowed mother. In 1160, as a significant figure in the revolt that broke out later that year. According to the contemporary chronicler, Hugo Falcandus and Archbishop Romuald II of Salerno, several counts led by Count Robert III of Loritello conspired to have Admiral Maio of Bari assassinated.

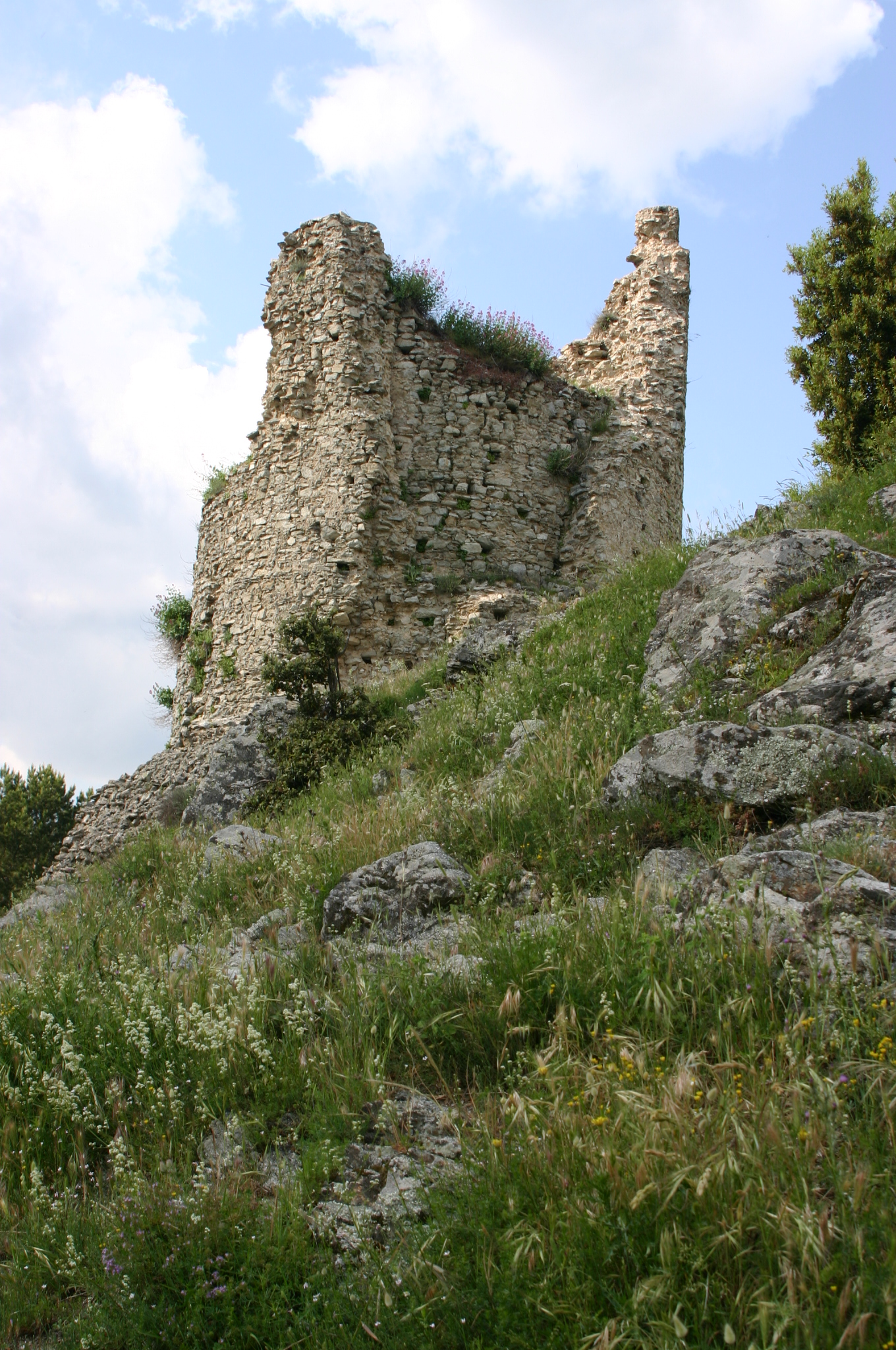
Ruins of the tower (Torrazzo) of the castle of Taverna, where Clementia held out against a siege during 1161–62

They offered Matthew Bonnellus, who was engaged to Maio's daughter, the hand of Clementia in marriage. Matthew assassinated Maio on 10 November 1160, however he never married Clementia.

In his book, "The History of the Tyrants of Sicily", Hugo Falcandus wrote:

"In Calabria the Countess of Catanzaro also defected to Robert, and had reinforced the powerful castle of Taberna with both knights and other necessities, so that if it happened that the king should cross the Straits, she could base herself there in safety together with her mother."

When King William I crossed over from Sicily to Calabria in the spring of 1161, Clementia initially resisted him from the castle of Taverna for a year but was forced to surrender in April 1162. Two of her relatives, Thomas (Note: Thomas is described as an uncle by Falcandus, in which case he is probably a brother of Segelgarda. On the other hand, Evelyn Jamison argues that he is the same person as Thomas, son of Geoffrey and thus first cousin of Clementia. He held three knight's fees in Monticchio and three in Carbonara. Described as a "son of the count of Catanzaro" (filius comitis Catacensis), he and his brother William subscribed the charter of Countess Bertha in 1145. William held the lordship of Luzzi in Calabria. Thomas's son, Geoffrey, succeeded both his father and his uncle William, as indicated by the charter which calls him Goffridus de Carbonara, dominus Lucii.) and Alfred, (Note: Falcandus calls Alferius an Uncle, but if he bore the same relationship as Thomas to her he must have been a first cousin. It is more likely he was a brother of Segelgarda.) had supported her and were brutally punished by the king. Clementina and her mother were later incarcerated in Messina and later in Palermo.

Clementia married Hugh Lupin the Elder around 1167, certainly by 1168. She is last mentioned in an order of Pope Alexander III placing the hospital of Buonalbergo, which had been built by Berard, lord of Pietrabbondante, under the protection of the Holy See at the request of Clementia. This can be dated to between 1179 and 1181. The date of Clementia's death is unknown. Her husband was still living in 1190, but by 1195 he had been succeeded as count by their eldest son.

Clementia and Hugh had twin sons, Hugh Lupin the Younger, who succeeded to the County of Catanzaro, and Jordan Lupin, who led a rebellion in Sicily in 1197.

== Works cited ==
- Cuozzo, Errico (1982). "I conti normanni di Catanzaro" (PDF). Miscellanea di studi storici (Calabria). 2: 109–27. Archived from the original (PDF) on 21 December 2016.
- Falcandus, Hugo (1998). Loud, Graham; Wiedemann, Thomas Ernst Josef (eds.). The History of the Tyrants of Sicily by "Hugo Falcandus," 1154-69. Manchester University Press. p. v. ISBN 9780719054358.
- Jamison, Evelyn (1931). "Note e documenti per la storia dei conti Normanni di Catanzaro". Archivio Storico per la Calabria e la Lucania. 1: 451–70.
- Jamison, Evelyn (1967). "The Career of Judex Tarentinus magne curie magister justiciarius and the Emergence of the Sicilian regalis magna curia under William I and the Regency of Margaret of Navarra, 1156–1172" (PDF). Proceedings of the British Academy. 53: 289–344.
- Fernández-Aceves, Hervin (23 July 2020). County and Nobility in Norman Italy: Aristocratic Agency in the Kingdom of Sicily, 1130-1189. Bloomsbury Publishing. ISBN 9781350138339.
- Matthew, Donald (30 July 1992). The Norman Kingdom of Sicily. Cambridge University Press. ISBN 9780521269117.
