= Hugh Lupin the Younger =

Baron of Kingdom of Sicily

Hugh Lupin (Latin: Hugo Lupinus; fl. 1187–97), called the Younger, was a baron of the Kingdom of Sicily. He was the eldest son of Count Hugh I of Catanzaro and Countess Clementia, and twin brother of Count Jordan of Bovino.

In the succession dispute that followed the death of King William II in 1189, Hugh supported Tancred, who rewarded him with the county of Conversano. It is possible that Hugh had been royal seneschal as early as 1187, but more likely that was his brother Jordan.

By November 1190, Tancred had appointed Hugh captain and master justiciar of Apulia and the Terra di Lavoro (Capitaneus et Magister Iusticiarius Totius Apulie et Terre Laboris). Sometime later, Hugh's father died and he inherited the county of Catanzaro, as Hugh II.

Following Tancred's death in 1194, Hugh supported the Emperor Henry VI's claim to Sicily. He witnessed several of Henry's documents in 1194–95. In 1197, while the German crusade was passing through Sicily, a revolt broke out. Hugh was implicated and his brother Jordan appears to have been the leader. The rebellion was soon crushed and Jordan executed.

Hugh had a son, Henry, who was count of Conversano on 10 January 1197 and apparently on good terms with Henry VI. His and his son's ultimate fates are unknown: no document after 1197 mentions them.
