= Bruttians =

Ancient Italic people

Bruttium

The Bruttians (Latin: Bruttii or Brettii) were an ancient Italic people. They inhabited the southern extremity of Italy, from the frontiers of Lucania to the Sicilian Straits and the promontory of Leucopetra. This roughly corresponds to the modern region of Calabria.

Occupying originally the mountains and hills of modern Calabria, they were the southernmost branch of the Osco-Umbrian Italic tribes, and were ultimately descended from the Samnites through the process of ver sacrum.

They are remembered as pillagers and conquerors of the ancient Greek poleis in Magna Graecia and brave rebels of the Romans.

The Museo dei Brettii e degli Enotri in Cosenza contains much recent data on the Bruttii.

== Etymology ==
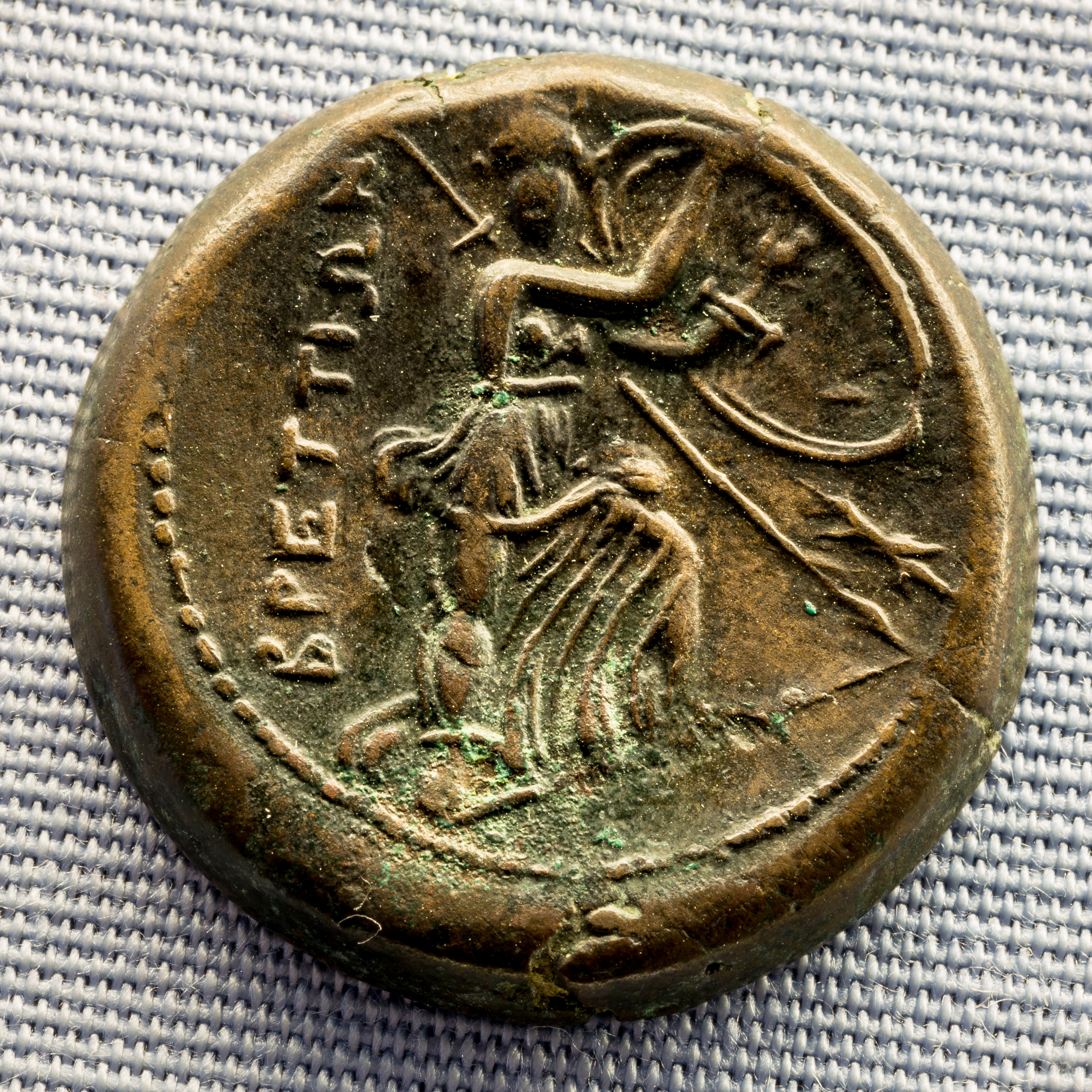
Bronze coin of the Bruttii (ΒΡΕΤΤΙΩΝ), 208-205 BC

The name Bruttii must have been ancient since Diodorus speaks of the Bruttians as having expelled the remainder of the Sybarites, who had settled Sybaris on the Traeis in 446/445 BC after the destruction of their own city.

The first archaeological evidence for the existence of Bruttii is an inscription "Bruties esum" (I am of Brutius) on pottery in southern Campania from the mid 6th century BC.

The name is Indo-European. It is similar to Illyrian ethnonym Brentii from *brentos (deer). A close variant is attested in the name of the Bruttii in ancient Greek (Ancient Greek: Βρέττιοι, romanized: Bréttioi) and the name of the community on its coinage (ΒΡΕΤΤΙΩΝ, "of the Brettioi"). Polybius, in more than one passage, calls it ἡ Βρεττιανὴ Χώρα, likely corresponding to the natives' name for their land, "Brettiōn".

After 356 BC when the Bruttii became independent, the name of the Bruttii became synonyms with "rebels" and "fugitive slaves" for the Lucanians and the ancient sources of the period.

== Geography ==
The land of the Bruttii covered almost the entire current province of Cosenza, except the northernmost part which was the southern part of historical Lucania, from which it was separated by a line drawn from the river Laus near the Tyrrhenian Sea to the Crathis near the Gulf of Tarentum. On the west it was washed by the Tyrrhenian Sea, and on the south and east by that known in ancient times as the Sicilian Sea, including under that appellation the Gulf of Tarentum. Their territory corresponds approximately to modern Calabria, which was named as such only during Byzantine times.

Livy uses the term Bruttii provincia.

It was included by Augustus in the Third Region (Regio III), together with Lucania; and the two provinces appear to have continued united for most administrative purposes until the fall of the Roman Empire, and were governed conjointly by a magistrate termed a Corrector. The Liber Coloniarum however treats the Provincia Bruttiorum as distinct from that of Lucania.

The term Bruttium has no evidence in ancient and late ancient times, and only the "land of the Bruttii" or Brittii is attested. This name remained unchanged even after the fall of the Western Roman Empire until from 650 AD the northern area under the direct control of the Lombards is indicated as Bruttium or Brettia in Byzantine documents.

== History ==
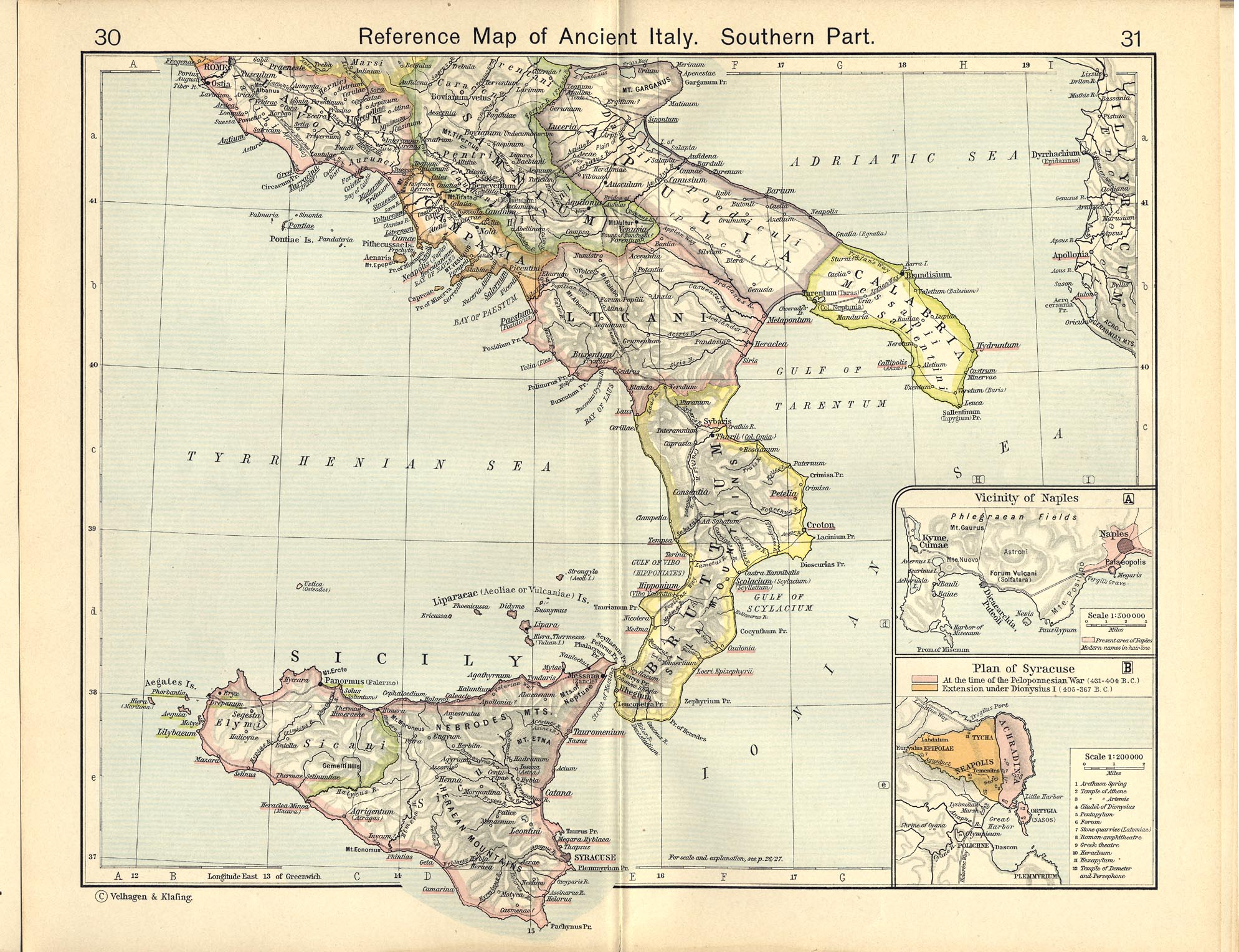
Southern Italy in antiquity.

=== Origins ===
The land occupied by the Bruttii was inhabited in the earliest times by the Oenotrians, a native Italic tribe whose name refers to winemaking, of which the Conii and Morgetes appear to have been subordinate divisions. It was while the Oenotrians were still masters of the land that the first Greek trading outposts were founded; and the beauty of the climate and country, as well as the rapid prosperity attained by these first settlements, proved so attractive that within a few years many Greek colonies appeared.

The geographer Stephanus of Byzantium who lived in the 6th century AD, citing Antiochus of Syracuse but above all Aristophanes, points out that the Brettii were already mentioned in the 5th century BC in particular referring to the bruttia pix (Sila pitch) from the forests of the Sila region. The main wealth of Bruttium came from its forests especially in the conifers of the Sila mountains which provided shelter for grazing cattle and were a source of timber and pitch, used for waterproofing in shipbuilding or for terracotta containers, for sealing the lids of dolia (vessels) for food products, and also used in medicine or cosmetics.

In the course of the 4th century a great change took place; the Lucanians (an Oscan people), who had been gradually extending their conquests towards the south, and had already made themselves masters of the northern parts of Oenotria, now pressed forwards into the Bruttian peninsula, and established their dominion over the interior of that country and many of the Greek outposts. This probably took place after their great victory over the Thurii, near Laüs, in 390 BC.

The rise of the Bruttii is dated by ancient authors to approximately 356 BC at the time of the expedition of Dion from Athens against Dionysius the Younger of Syracuse. The wars of the latter as well as of his father with the Greek cities in southern Italy and the state of confusion and weakness to which these were reduced in consequence, probably contributed in a great degree to pave the way for the rise of the Bruttian power.

The Bruttii are represented by some ancient authors as a congregation of rebellious natives; Justin describes them as headed by 500 youths of Lucanian origin who joined the shepherds living in the forests together with other predecessor Italic tribes from the area, not just the Oenotrians, but also the Ausones, Mamertines and Sicels. These groups are described as mostly fugitive slaves by Diodorus and as "experts in affairs of war". In these stories because of their social conditions the name of the Bruttii acquired the meaning of "rebels" or "fugitive slaves".

The Bruttii spoke a variant of Oscan and Illyrian settlement in older periods provided considerable Illyrian elements.

A recent proposal is that the majority of the Brettii descended from indigenous populations of protohistoric tradition, of whom we have inscriptions in the Achaean alphabet and in the Paleo-Italic language across almost the entire territory of present-day Calabria. The Brettii, therefore, would not be slaves or descendants of the Lucanians but rather Italics from an ethnic substratum of the Oenotri starting at least from the 5th BC.

=== Development ===
The progress of the Bruttii after their first appearance in history was rapid. Expansionist aims began, and the Bruttians managed important successes both in the south and north of their territory until they impacted the east and west with the cities of Magna Graecia. They quickly became numerous and powerful enough to defy the Lucanians, and maintained their independence in the mountain districts of the interior. Their independence seems to have been readily acknowledged by the Lucanians.

The Bruttian tribes formed themselves into numerous small villages a few kilometres from each other, interspersed with fortified urban nuclei, in which they gathered the higher social classes (warriors, magistrates and priests) to make decisions for the management and defense of neighbouring villages. Money was minted, and the social fabric began to take shape with the consolidation of social classes, the most important being the warriors.

They coalesced into a league, the Confoederatio Bruttiorum, the culmination of the expansion, culture and economy of the Bruttii, and made Consentia (present-day Cosenza) their capital. The other main cities were Pandosia, Aufugum (present-day Montalto Uffugo), Argentanum, Clampetia, Bergae, Besidiae (present-day Bisignano) and Ocriculum.

In the phase preceding the Roman occupation of the region in the Hellenistic age, archaeology has identified around sixty indigenous centres in Calabria, of which fifteen are fortified.

=== Wars with Greek cities ===
Less than 30 years after their first revolt, they united with the Lucanians as allies against their Greek neighbours and attacked and occupied the Greek cities of Hipponium, Terina, and Thurii. The latter applied for assistance to Alexander, king of Epirus, who crossed over into Italy with an army, and carried on the war for several successive campaigns, during which he reduced Heraclea, Consentia, and Terina; but finally perished in a battle against the combined forces of the Lucanians and Bruttii, near Pandosia, 326 BC.

They next had to contend against the arms of Agathocles of Syracuse, who ravaged their coasts with his fleets, took the city of Hipponium, which he converted into a strong fortress and naval station, and compelled the Bruttians to conclude a disadvantageous peace. But they soon broke this treaty; and recovered possession of Hipponium. This appears to have been the period when the Bruttian nation had reached its highest pitch of power and prosperity; it was not long before they had to contend with a more formidable adversary, and as early as 282 BC they joined the Lucanians and Samnites against the growing power of Rome.

=== Pyrrhic War ===
A few years later they are mentioned as sending auxiliaries to the army of Pyrrhus, but after his defeat and his expulsion from Italy in 275 BC they had to bear the full brunt of the war. After repeated campaigns and successive triumphs of the Roman generals, Gaius Fabricius Luscinus and Lucius Papirius, the Bruttii were finally reduced to submission, and compelled to purchase peace by the surrender of one-half of the great forest of Sila, so valuable for its pitch and timber.

The Brettian settlement system seems to have dissolved probably following the defeat of Pyrrhus. The cities of Bruttium were called allies but forbidden to make alliances on their own and to mint coins. The only advantage granted by Rome was that of preserving the traditional laws, magistracies and customs: it was a formal autonomy, because the Roman garrisons installed in the fortified citadels ensured that everything was carried out according to Roman interests.

In the decades preceding the 2nd Punic war, the cities and agricultural landscapes of the Bruttii show a picture of general impoverishment, a consequence of the destruction of the Pyrrhic war and the political and social upheavals affecting the cities of Magna Graecia.

=== Second Punic War ===
The Brutti had never completely submitted and, having reorganised, took advantage of Hannibal 's invasion in 218 BC to become his allies during the Second Punic War after the Battle of Cannae. They reconquered Consentia and tried to regain their independence.

Rhegium (modern Reggio Calabria) remained firm, and was able to defy the Carthaginians throughout the war. In 215 BC, Hanno, the lieutenant of Hannibal, after his defeat at Grumentum by Tiberius Gracchus, threw himself into Bruttium, where he was soon joined by a body of fresh troops from Carthage under Bomilcar; and from this time he made this region his stronghold, from whence he repeatedly issued to oppose the Roman generals in Lucania and Samnium, while he constantly fell back upon it as a place of safety when defeated or hard pressed by the enemy. The physical character of the country rendered it necessarily a military position of the greatest strength: and after the defeat and death of Hasdrubal Hannibal himself put forces into some Bruttian territory, where he continued to maintain his ground against the Roman generals. In the last phases of the war in 204-2 BC many cities of the Bruttii surrendered to the consul Gnaeus Servilius Caepio after the conquest of Clampetia in 204 by P. Sempronius.

For four years Hannibal retained his positions in this province and made his headquarters for the most part in the neighbourhood of Crotona, but the name of Castra Hannibalis retained by a small town on the Gulf of Squillace, points to his having occupied this also as a permanent station. Meanwhile, the Romans, though avoiding any decisive engagement, were continually gaining ground on him by the successive reduction of towns and fortresses, so that very few of these remained in the hands of the Carthaginian general when he was finally recalled from Italy.

=== Romanisation ===
Roman Regio III Lucania et Bruttii

From Hannibal's departure towards Africa, measures adopted by the Romans under Caepio to punish them completed their romanisation and the ravages of so many successive campaigns inflicted a severe blow upon the prosperity of Bruttium. They were deprived of the right to bear arms, and en masse became slaves or employed in inferior roles as attendants of the magistrates instead of servants and not able to serve as Roman legionaries. Rome took away the office of city-state from Consentia, dissolved the Confederation and confiscated almost all the territory, transforming it into ager publicus, and the system of hill fortifications was abandoned or destroyed.

But it was some time before they were altogether crushed: for several years after the end of the Second Punic War one of the praetors was annually sent with an army to watch over the Bruttians; and it was evidently with the view of more fully securing their subjection that three colonies of Roman veteran soldiers and their families were established in their territory, two of Roman citizens at Tempsa and Crotona, and a third with Latin rights at Hipponium, to which the name of Vibo Valentia was now given. A fourth was at the same time settled at Thurii on their immediate frontier. Among the settlers at the latter were some ancestors of the first Roman Emperor, Augustus.

In the last quarter of the 2nd century BC the Via Popilia was opened which took on the role of backbone, not only military and political but also economic, of Romanisation and added to the existing Ionian and Tyrrhenian coastal routes which perhaps were restored and improved.

So complete was the romanisation of the region that the Bruttians were later not mentioned, with a few exceptions. First, their country again became the theatre of war during the revolt of Spartacus, who after his first defeats by Crassus, took refuge in the southernmost portion of Bruttium (called by Plutarch the Rhegian peninsula), in which the Roman general sought to confine him by drawing lines of intrenchment across the isthmus from sea to sea. The insurgent leader however forced his way through, and again carried the war into the heart of Lucania.

During the Civil Wars the coasts of Bruttium were repeatedly laid waste by the fleets of Sextus Pompeius, and witnessed several conflicts between the latter and those of Octavian, who had established the headquarters both of his army and navy at Vibo. Strabo speaks of the whole province as reduced in his time to a state of complete decay.

=== Late Empire ===
The traditional view was that southern Italy including Bruttii was insignificant economically and declined further in the last centuries of the empire (see Crisis of the Third Century) as elsewhere.

Between the 2nd and 3rd centuries many smaller villa-farms, which had lower productivity and could not compete with the larger ones (especially latifundia), often failed and were forced to sell them to the wealthy or more successful land owners who were able to invest in land and multiply their productivity and wealth. These were then able to expand their luxurious villas with greater opulence and monumental style. In Bruttium for these reasons, more than 60% of the villas from the Republican and early imperial period disappeared in this period, and this effect continued in the 4-5th centuries in particular the coastal areas of the region.

However, the wealth of the Roman Villa Palazzi di Casignana in the 4th century, one of many examples in the region that have been discovered in the last 20 years, shows that the area enjoyed a long period of relative tranquility and security during the 3rd and also over the next century. Indeed, the territory experienced an economic boom and significant growth in the rural population, with the numerous villas, farms, villages, churches and rural dioceses identified by surface reconnaissance and aerial photography. Nearby there were similar luxurious villas at Marina di Gioiosa Ionica (1st c. BC- 4th c. AD), Naniglio in Gioiosa Ionica, Ardore (3rd-4th c.) and at Quote San Francesco (5th- 6th c.).

The fortunate central position of this area in the Mediterranean and the good land and sea network were decisive factors for the investment by the rich Roman senatorial aristocracy and local notables in the 4th and 5th centuries, and for the holding of the imperial property which was significant in this area. Southern Italy was one of the last enclaves, between the 5th and 6th centuries, of great estates and of economic development linked to agriculture, livestock farming, craftsmanship and trade, while elsewhere in Italy the system was crumbling. The coastal area, however, was abandoned in the 7th century due probably to Arab incursions which led to development of centres in the safest hills in the interior, such as Gerace.

== See also ==
- List of ancient Italic peoples
- Bruttia gens

== Sources ==
- William Smith, LLD, Ed., BRUTTII, Dictionary of Greek and Roman Geography (1854) https://www.perseus.tufts.edu/hopper/text?doc=Perseus:text:1999.04.0064:entry=bruttii-geo
- Cappelletti, Loredana (2017). "The Bruttii". In Farney, Gary; Bradley, Guy (eds.). The Peoples of Ancient Italy. De Gruyter. ISBN 978-1614513001.
- Palmer, Leonard Robert (1988). The Latin Language. University of Oklahoma Press. ISBN 080612136X.
- Szemerényi, Oswald (1987). Scripta Minora: Latin. Institut für Sprachwissenschaft der Universität Innsbruck. ISBN 385124592X.
- Pier Giovanni Guzzo, Storia e cultura dei Brettii https://www.store.rubbettinoeditore.it/catalogo/storia-e-cultura-dei-brettii/
