= Laino Castello =

- Comune
- Comune di Laino Castello
- Coat of arms

- Location within Italy Location within Calabria
- Coordinates: 39°56′10″N 15°58′40″E
- Country: Italy
- Region: Calabria
- Province: Cosenza (CS)
- Frazioni: Campicello, Pianolaria, Pretiorio, Filomato, San Liguori, San Nicola, Fornari, Pianolacorte, Santo Ianni, Fiumarito, Aria della Valle, Angritano, Carreto, Buongianni, Veltro, San Costantino, Feliceta, Gallarizzo, Molinaro, Fornace, Simonella, Santa Maria, Umari, Pantani

Government
  - Mayor: Gaetano Palermo

Area
  - Total: 37.33 km^{2} (14.41 sq mi)
- Elevation: 545 m (1,788 ft)

Population (31 August 2017)
  - Total: 825
  - Density: 22.1/km^{2} (57.2/sq mi)
- Demonym: Lainesi
- Time zone: UTC+1 (CET)
  - Summer (DST): UTC+2 (CEST)
- Postal code: 87015
- Dialing code: 0981
- Patron saint: St. Theodore of Amasea
- Saint day: 9 November
- Website: Official website

Laino Castello (Calabrian: Castièddru) is a town and comune in the province of Cosenza, in the Calabria region of southern Italy.

== See also ==
- Laino Borgo
