= Laüs =

Ancient Italian city

Laus
- Λᾶος; Laos
- Laus
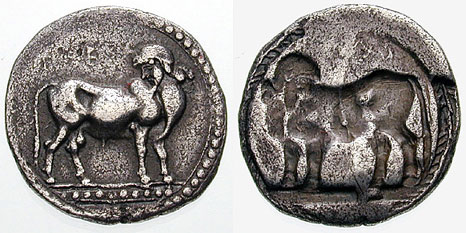
- Stater of Laus with man-headed bull, c. 510-500 BC

- Location within Italy
- 39°46′3″N 15°49′50″E
- Periods: Archaic Greek to Roman Republican
- Cultures: Greek, Lucanian
- Location: Marcellina, Province of Cosenza, Calabria, Italy

Site notes
- Area: 60 ha (150 acres)
- Excavation dates: First between 1929 and 1932
- Owner: Public
- Management: Soprintendenza per i Beni Archeologici della Calabria
- Website: ArcheoCalabriaVirtual

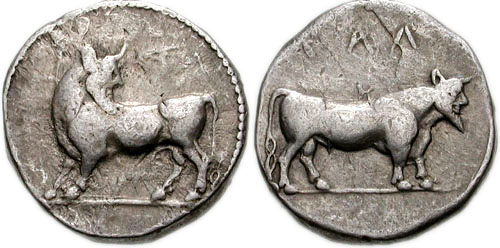
Stater of Laus with man-headed bull, c. 490-470 BC

Laüs or Laus (Ancient Greek: Λᾶος; Italian: Laos) was an ancient city on the coast of the Tyrrhenian Sea. It was at the mouth of the Lao River, which formed the boundary between Lucania and Bruttium in ancient times and gave it its name.

The archaeological site of the city can be found at a short distance to the east of Marcellina, near Santa Maria del Cedro in Calabria.

== History ==
Herodotus states that the inhabitants of Sybaris who had survived the destruction of their city in 510 BC took refuge in Laus and Scidrus. Silver coins were found with the legend LAFINON and symbols similar to those of the coins of Sybaris, dated between 500 and 440 BC.

Diodorus Siculus implies that that city had been captured by the Lucanians before or during 390 BC. Thurii had repelled a force of the Lucanians which had attacked their territory in 390 BC. The Lucanians then withdrew to their own territory and Thurians pursued them to lay siege to the "prosperous" town of Laus but on the way the Thurians were ambushed and crushed by the Lucanians.

Pseudo-Scylax writes that it was a colony of Thurii.

Strabo in 7 BC-23 AD describes the city as still being in existence. He mentions a heroon to Draco, a companion of Odysseus. Pliny the Elder in approximately 77–79 AD states that the city no longer existed.

== Excavations ==
The first excavation started between 1929 and 1932. The necropolis of Laus now lies below Marcellina and is notable for its important finds. A rich tomb chamber was discovered by accident in 1961 not far from the railway station of Marcellina, in which were dozens of red-figured vases, bronze and precious metals, and a finely crafted bronze armour. Dated to the second half of the fourth century BC, it is now exhibited in the Museo Nazionale della Magna Grecia in Reggio Calabria. Other burials of the same period, though less rich, were found in the same area in the 1950s and 1960s.

The excavations revealed the city was defended on at least three sides by a wall. The urban space was organised according to a grid plan with at least two central roadways in a north–south orientation and 12 m wide. These were intersected at regular distances of 96 m by perpendicular roads in an east–west orientation and approximately 5 m wide. This created a checkerboard layout of building blocks, which were further separated by narrow lanes. In the south-east of the site, near the present cemetery, an area of artisanal kilns for the production of ceramics was discovered.

== The site today ==
The Laus Archaeological Park was created in 1994 to protect the site covering an area of approximately 60 hectares.

== See also ==
- List of ancient Greek cities
