= Santa Maria del Cedro =

- Comune
- Comune di Santa Maria del Cedro

- Location within Italy Location within Calabria
- Coordinates: 39°45′N 15°50′E
- Country: Italy
- Region: Calabria
- Province: Cosenza (CS)
- Frazioni: Marcellina

Government
  - Mayor: Ugo Vetere

Area
  - Total: 18 km^{2} (6.9 sq mi)
- Elevation: 110 m (360 ft)

Population (31 December 2018)
  - Total: 5,004
  - Density: 280/km^{2} (720/sq mi)
- Demonym: Santamarioti
- Time zone: UTC+1 (CET)
  - Summer (DST): UTC+2 (CEST)
- Postal code: 87020
- Dialing code: 0985
- Patron saint: San Michele Arcangelo
- Website: Official website

Santa Maria del Cedro is a town and comune in the province of Cosenza, Calabria, Italy. The town's name indicates the cultivation of the special diamante citron, which is used as Etrog by the Jews during their Feast of Tabernacles.

Sights include remains of Norman castle and aqueduct and the archaeological site of Laüs, an ancient Greek city on the coast of the Tyrrhenian Sea, in Marcellina, a village nearby.

The [4]

== International relations ==
Santa Maria del Cedro is twinned with:

- Dolní Benešov, Czech Republic
