= Villa della Palombara =

Archaeological site of an Ancient Roman villa

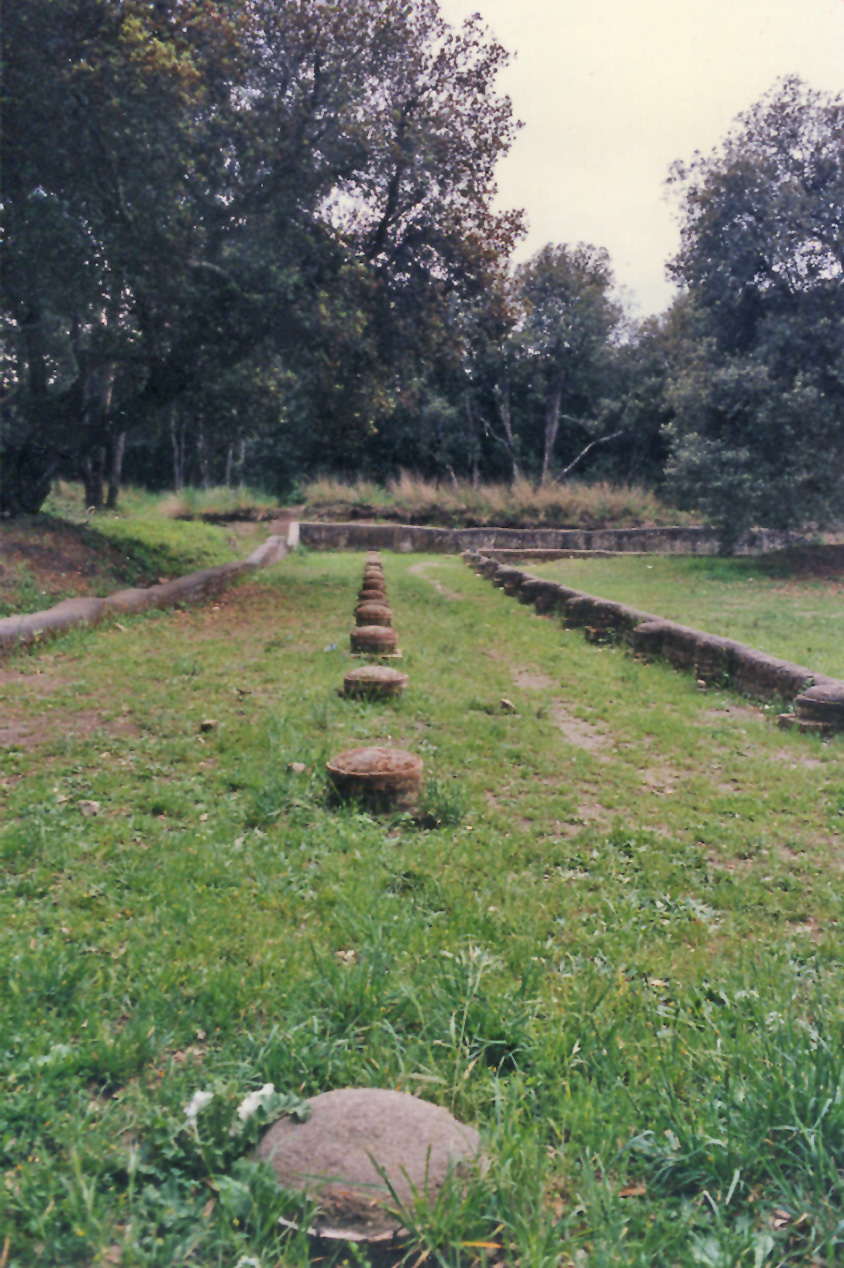
The portico of the peristyle

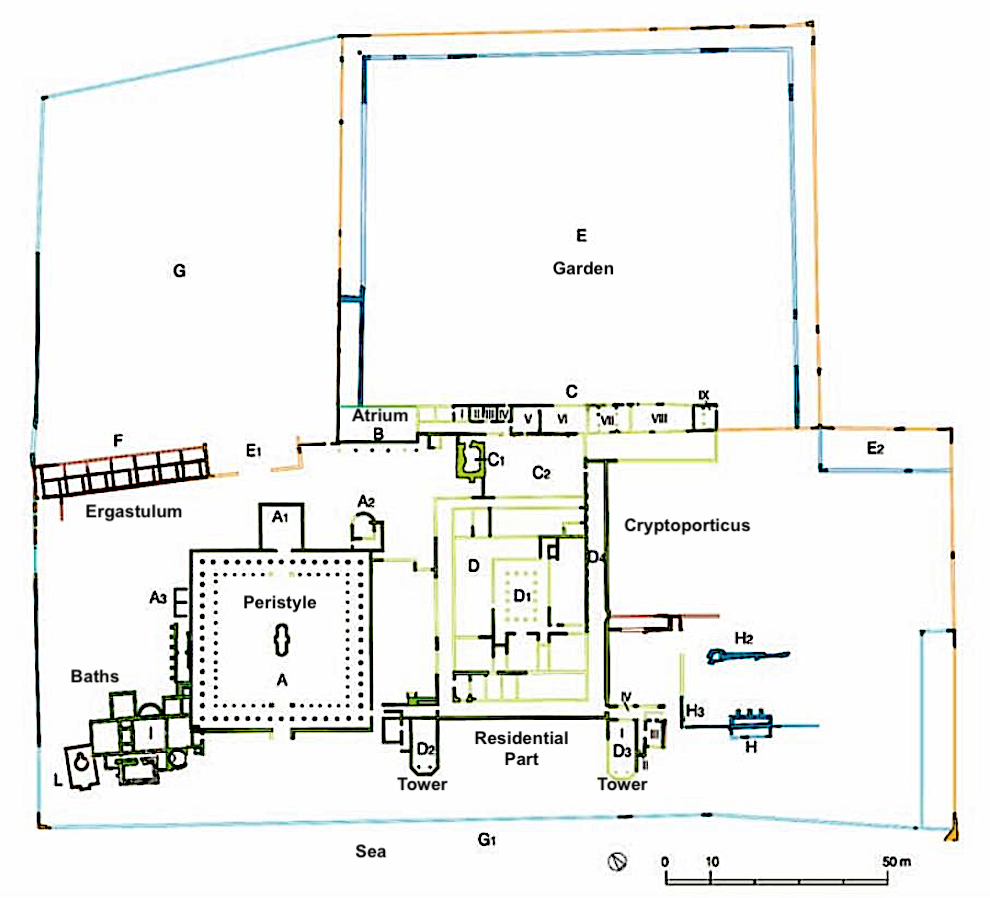
Villa della Palombara

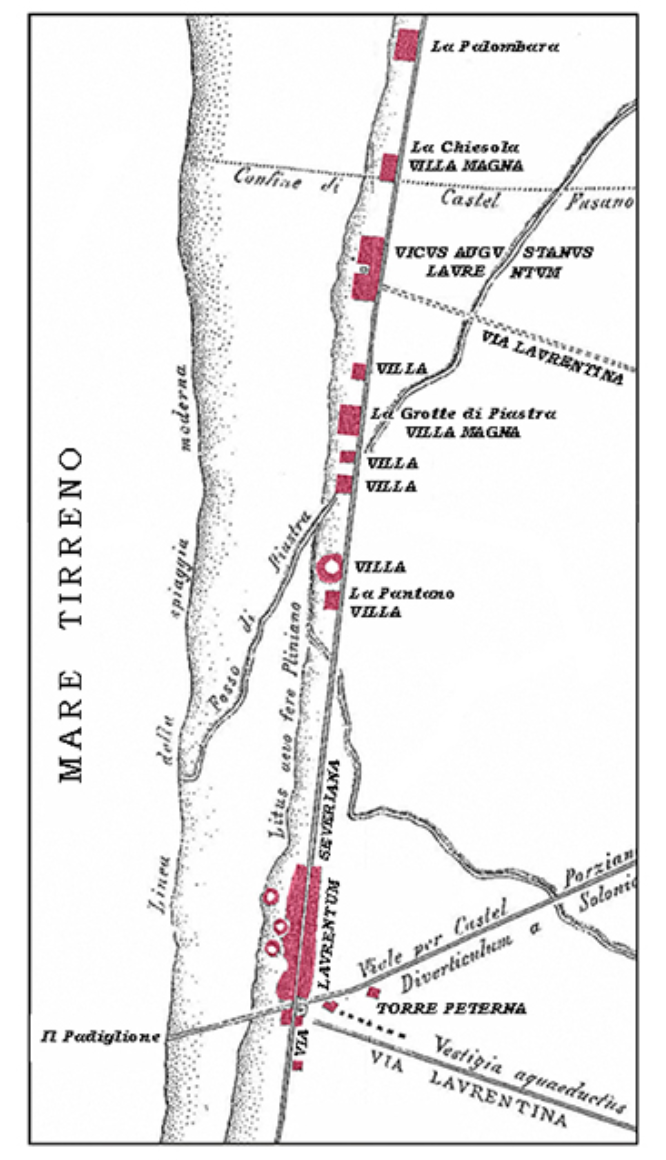
Roman villas between Ostia and Laurentum (Lanciani 1903), villa Palombara at the top

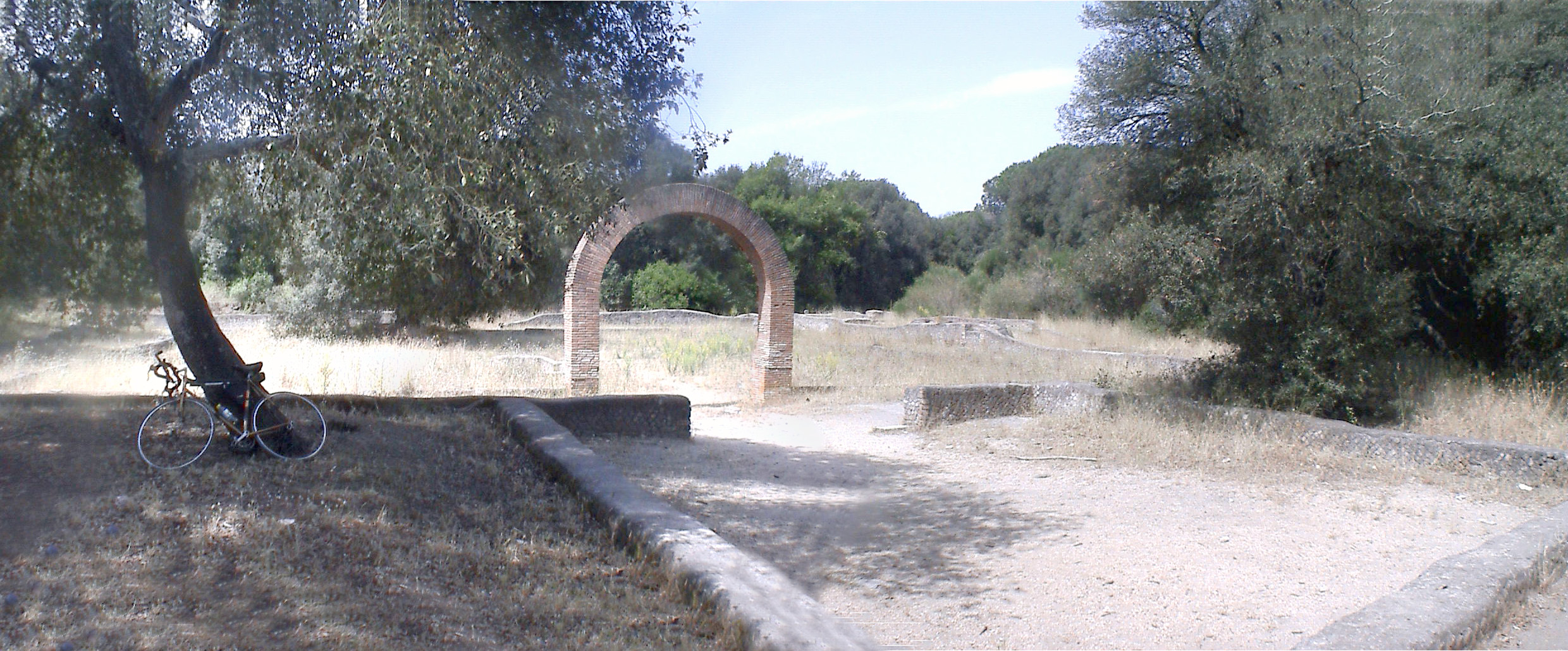
North eastern side of the peristyle

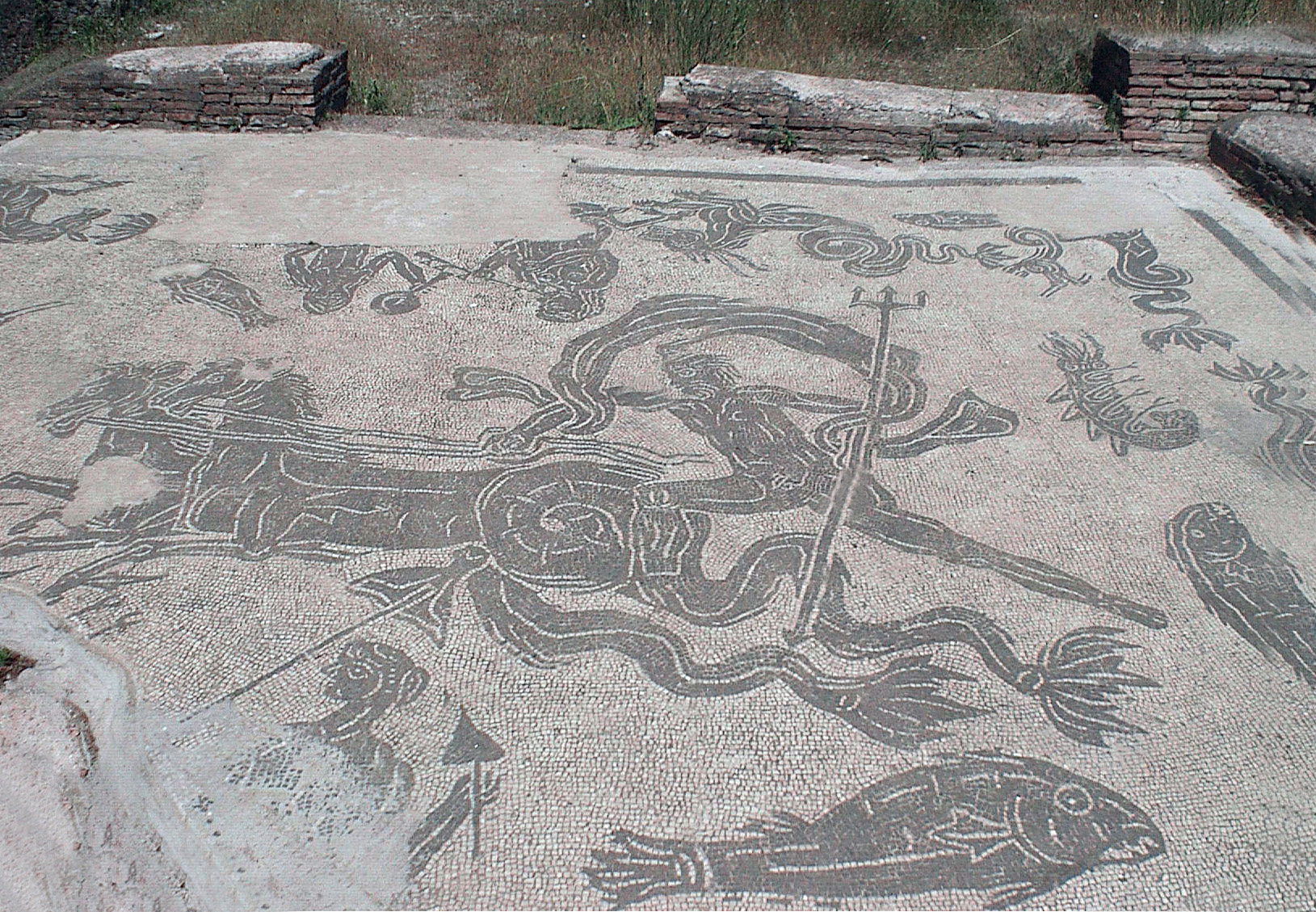
Baths: Mosaic of Neptune

The Villa della Palombara was a large, sumptuous ancient Roman villa. It is now an archaeological site located within the pine forest of Castel Fusano near Ostia, Italy. It originally may have belonged to the famous orator Hortensius (114–50 BC). It would have impressed with its exceptional proportions covering about 4 hectares.

It was built on the seashore overlooking the sea, on the ancient Via Severiana between ancient Ostia and Laurentum. Due to build up of sand it is now 600m from the beach.

The villa was rediscovered in 1713 and erroneously identified with the villa of Pliny the Younger who had a villa nearby at Laurentum described in a letter addressed to his friend Gallus and probably located at Villa Magna.

== History ==
Excavations have identified 6 building phases from the mid-1st century BC to the beginning of the 3rd century AD.

In the first phase (first half 1st c. BC to early 1st c. AD) the villa was built with two large contiguous blocks parallel to the beach. The entrance from the coast on the south-west side gave a monumental view of the facade with two polygonal towers with several floors jutting out towards the sea and behind which was the residential area (D), while to the left was the large porticoed peristyle (A), the public part, with a double row of columns. The walls of the portico were painted red, at least in the lower part and facing its entrance from the beach on the opposite side of the quadriportico was an arch between the columns. The private, residential part had rooms around a small colonnaded atrium (D1) and was raised on the dunes, on a platform enlarged by a cryptoporticus so as to give a panoramic view over the sea. The main entrance was from the north through the atrium room B.

The service sector was on the back of the structure, where there was also a two-level cistern.

In the 2nd phase at the beginning of the 1st century AD the whole villa area was enclosed by a perimeter wall on the north-west, north-east and south-east sides of the villa and the area E behind the residential part made into a large garden (viridarium). The original northern entrance in room B was moved to the west and the atrium B was converted into a kitchen and paved with a patchwork of mosaic fragments from the previous phase.

From the middle of the 1st century (3rd phase), a group of two-storey modular housing units (F) in opus reticulatum were built along the northern border of the complex, probably intended for slave labour (ergastulum). A series of channels in the viridarium and a basin in the western corner identified as a possible fishpond were also installed.

In the first decades of the 2nd century (4th phase) the villa expanded towards the hinterland, with the enclosure of a new area (G) with a perimeter wall and the embellishment of the garden (E) wall with columns. Another perimeter wall (G1) was also built on the beach side.

From about 130 AD in the Antonine era (phase 5) there was a major restructuring of the peristyle area, with the insertion of baths in the western corner, equipped with heated rooms and pools. The magnificent monochrome mosaic of the triumph of Neptune paves the entrance area (apodyterium) and resembles the Neptune baths in nearby Ostia of 139 AD which date this to the Antonine age. A cistern for the baths replaced some rooms on the side of the peristyle. A fountain and pool were also installed in the centre of the peristyle (A). In the south-east area of the villa another pool and ornamental fountain (H) was added consisting of a rectangular brick basin (approximately 8.50 x 1.80 m).

In the Severan age (193-235 AD, 6th phase) a covered corridor along the boundary wall was added.

Around the middle the 3rd century progressive abandonment began with only sporadic occupation, and in the 5th century the small Christian basilica was built close to the via Severiana signalling the end of the villa.

== Excavations ==
The site was discovered in 1713 and in the following years the first excavation campaigns began by the Marquis Marcello Sacchetti. After about a century, excavations resumed at the suggestion of the archaeologist Carlo Fea, who managed to convince Prince Agostino Chigi to sponsor the initiative.

During the excavations in the 19th century, the site also became known locally as Villa della Palombara.

The first scientific excavation was carried out in 1933, the year in which the area was purchased by the Municipality of Rome, and was followed by another excavation campaign which began in the 1980s and lasted until 2008, managed by the Capitoline Superintendency for cultural heritage. These last two campaigns revealed that the original interpretation was wrong; according to the archaeologist Colini, the Pliny the Younger's villa should in fact be in the presidential estate of Castelporziano.

== The Villa ==
=== The Monumental facade ===
The entrance from the sea on the south-west side consisted of a facade flanked by two polygonal towers of several floors and protuding towards the sea. Behind this facade was the residential area (D), This almost unique design feature in Roman villas was similar only to that at the later Roman Villa Palazzi di Casignana.

=== The peristyle ===
The peristyle (a courtyard surrounded by columns) was built in the first phase of the villa (second half of the 1st century BC to beginning of the 1st century AD) and is composed of a small garden surrounded by a square-shaped portico, part of the "public" area of the villa.

The entrance was through a monumental arch, which no longer exists, flanked by two columns. From there, you could reach the garden. The rear part of the external line of columns was interrupted by an arch similar to that of the entrance, on the same axis as it. The brick arch visible today is a reconstruction of the 1950s by Colini. Behind this arch is a triclinium (a room for banquets), with a floor decorated with a monochrome mosaic. The portico was composed of a double row of columns that supported a gabled roof. The masonry columns were covered in white plaster resembling marble. The inner wall of the portico was probably painted red with a "herringbone" stripe (opus spicatum). In phase 5, the curvilinear design brick fountain was added, still visible today in the centre of the garden, and the row of internal columns was equipped with a small masonry balustrade. To the southwest of the peristyle, near the angle on the right, the baths could be reached via a few steps, and to the east was the residential area on a dune.

=== The baths ===
The foyer of the baths is decorated with a mosaic floor of black and white tesserae representing Neptune in his chariot pulled by seahorses. The scene, which unfolds around the centrally positioned god, features: two announcers, a female with a sistrum (an ancient instrument of Egyptian origin) and another male with a flute; a female figure with a fish tail who holds in her hands a thyrsus (a long stick with a pine cone at the end) and various marine animals, including seahorses, a sea lion, a lobster, a shrimp, some fish and a dolphin. To the northeast of the vestibule are two small changing rooms (apodyteria).

The baths also went through several phases of development: the presence of walls of uncertain period in the caldarium indicates that the baths were already foreseen in the original villa and that they were later entirely rebuilt during the Antonine dynasty.

== Paleo-Christian basilica ==
The paleo-Christian basilica, measuring 16.6 x 9.4 m, which stands outside the northeast supporting wall of the Villa della Palombara, a few steps from the ancient route of the Via Severiana, was discovered "by chance" in 1939 by Colini. In 1953, during studies conducted by Gatti at the site, a child's tomb with a pointed roof and a marble sarcophagus with marine scenes and a funerary inscription, dated by style, was discovered outside the entrance to the church and dated to 150-175 AD. Two phases in the history of the basilica were recognized. In the first, from the 4th century, the church had a single nave, with a projecting semicircular apse and the portico with columns covered by a gabled roof. In the second phase, a schola cantorum (a space opposite the main altar reserved for singers and generally surrounded by a masonry fence, usually decorated with marble slabs) was built inside the nave; on the outside, the spaces between the side columns were bricked up.
