= Roman Villa Palazzi di Casignana =

Roman villa in Casignana, Italy

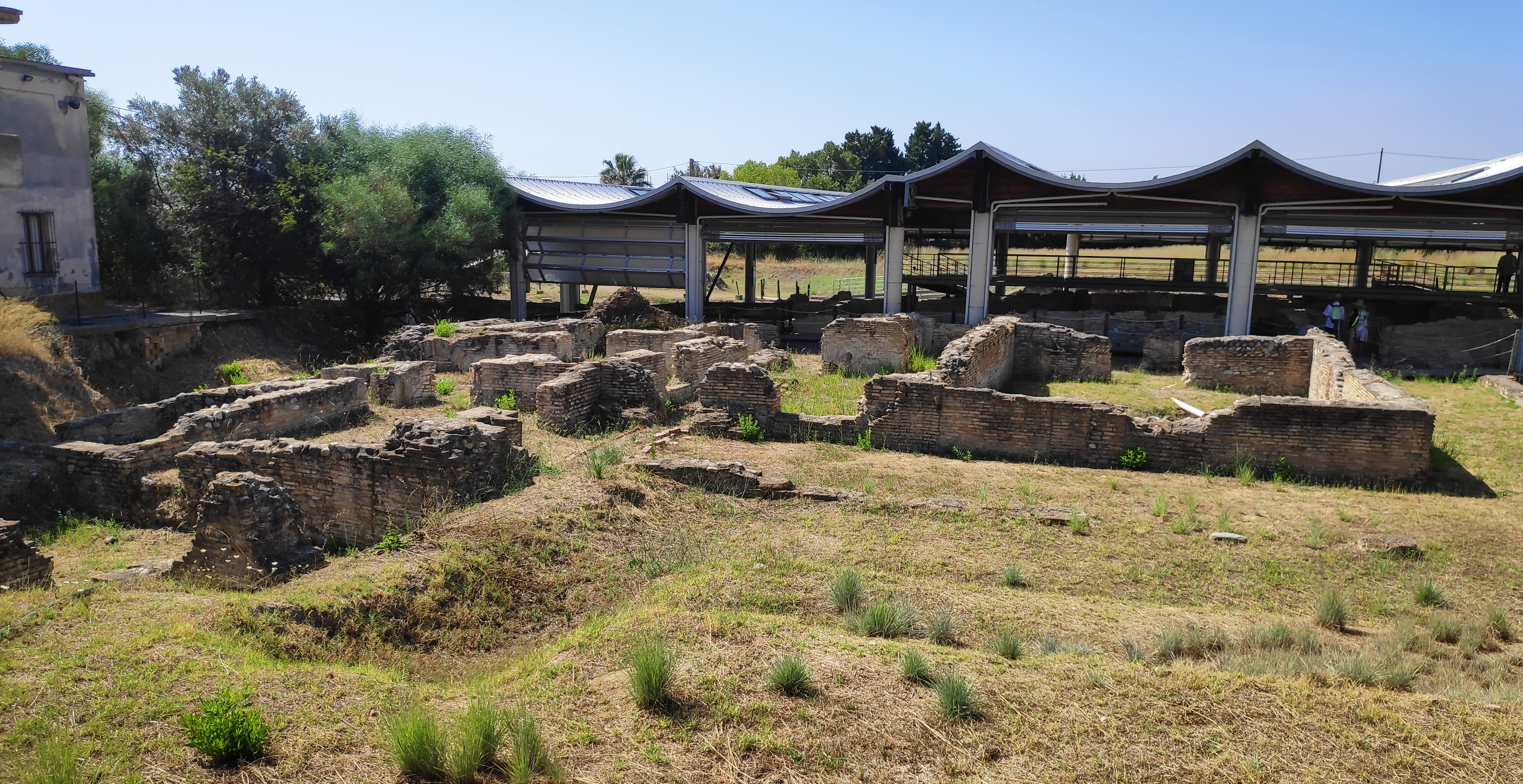
Roman Villa di Casignana

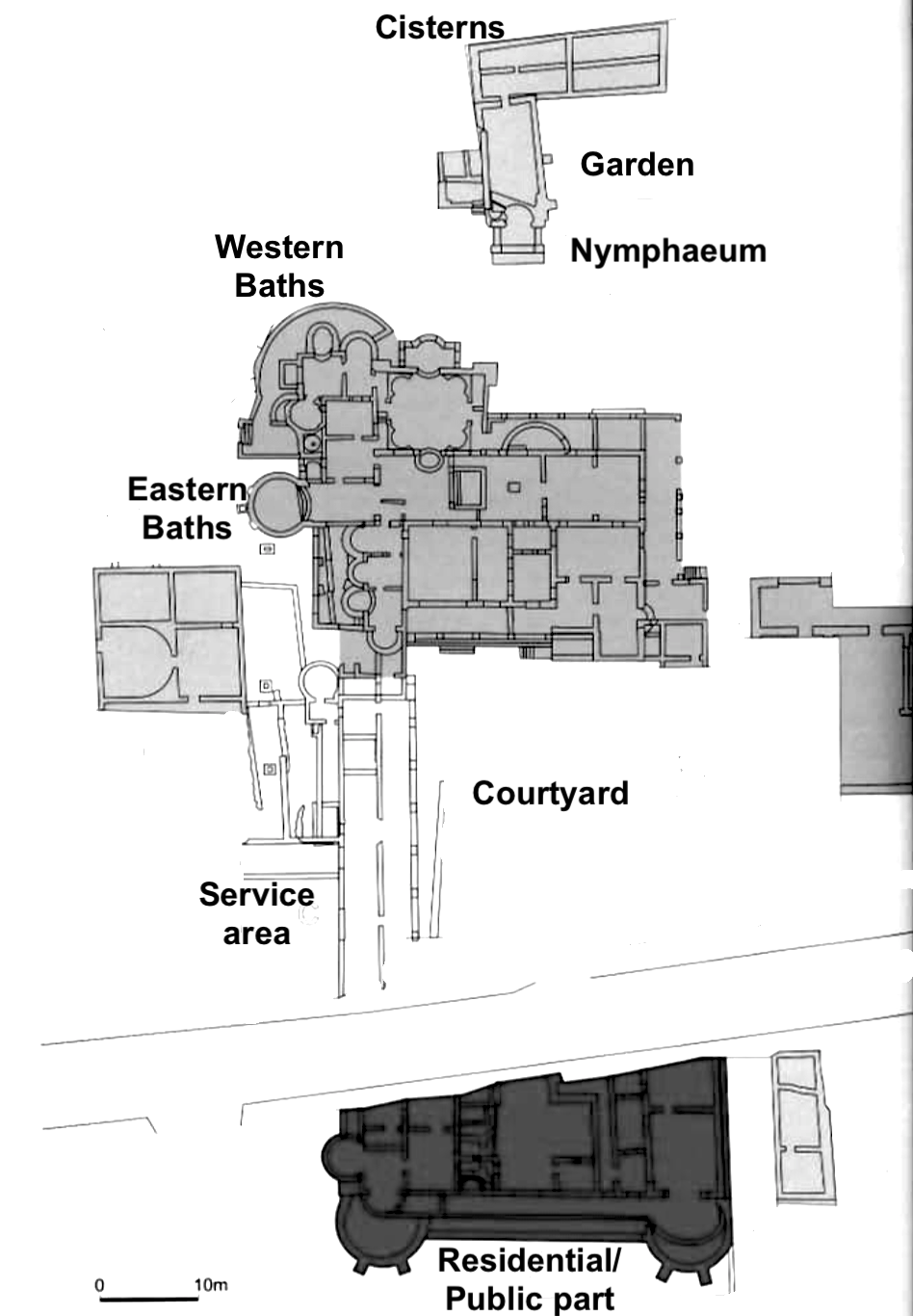
Plan of Roman Villa di Casignana

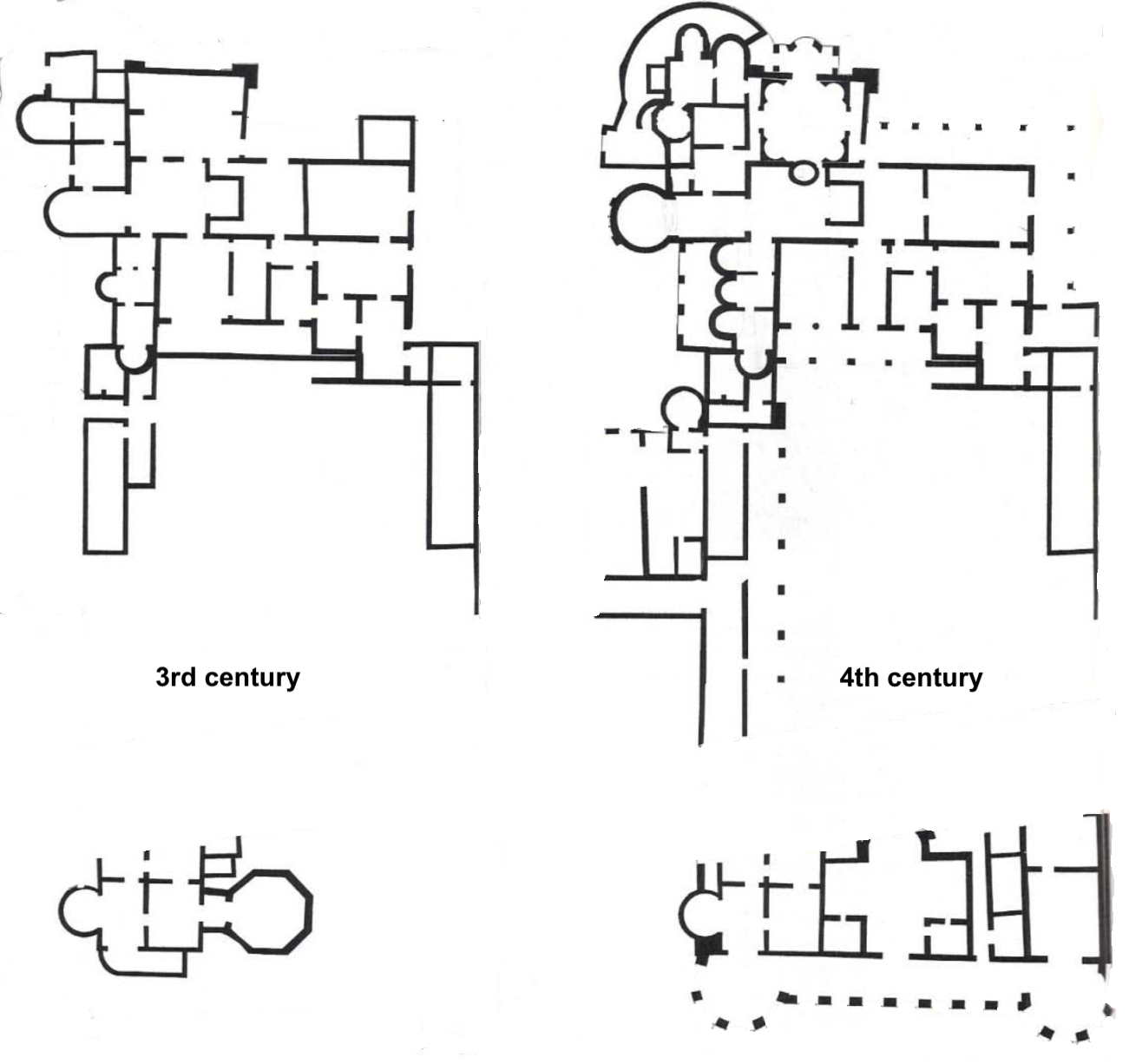
Summary of 3rd-4th c. modifications

The extensive, luxurious Roman villa Palazzi di Casignana is located on the seashore and near the ancient road linking ancient Locri and Rhegion in today's province of Calabria, Italy. It was discovered in 1964. It reached its zenith during the late empire of the 4th c. AD, a period of turbulence elsewhere.

It is of exceptional size, extending over 15 hectares and with lavish decorations including mosaic floors and exotic marbles covering the walls. It is a monumental Roman villa in Calabria, with the most Roman floor mosaics, and at least 23 rooms decorated with a rich variety of designs, both geometric and figurative.

== History ==
The villa was located in the Roman province of Lucania et Bruttii, specifically in the home of the ancient tribe of the Bruttii. The ancient city of Locri, 15 km away, probably played an important role in the economy and life of the owners. It is very likely that the later owner of the villa was influential and prominent in Locri and in the Roman province.

The oldest villa building dates to the 1st century AD, and nine phases of later modification have been identified. The most grandiose development was between the 3rd and 4th centuries with the addition of a monumental residential area, including the sumptuous apsidal Room I with rich floors and exotic marble veneers. Other modifications included two sets of monumental baths: the Western and the Eastern Baths, and all the rooms of the grander Western Baths were more elegantly arranged with the addition of apses and expensive floor mosaics.

The display of wealth would have impressed a sense of supremacy on guests to convivial and aristocratic banquets and gatherings which the presence of baths and reception rooms also support. By this means the dominus of the villa reinforced his political influence over the territory and its community.

Between the 4th and 5th centuries, perhaps following damage by the earthquake of around 365, the baths had a further phase of restructuring and expansion.

The villa was abandoned in the first half of the 5th century but a small settlement continued there until the 7th century.

=== Development of villas in Bruttium ===
The traditional view was that southern Italy including Bruttium was insignificant economically and declined further in the last centuries of the empire (see Crisis of the Third Century) as elsewhere, but the wealth of the Villa at Palazzi di Casignana in the 4th century, one of many examples in the region that have been discovered since about 1990, shows that the area enjoyed a long period of relative tranquility and security during the 3rd and 4th centuries. Indeed, the territory experienced an economic boom and significant growth in the rural population, with the numerous villas, farms, villages, churches and rural dioceses identified by surface reconnaissance and aerial photography. Nearby were similar luxurious villas at Marina di Gioiosa Ionica (1st c. BC- 4th c. AD), Naniglio in Gioiosa Ionica, Ardore (3rd-4th c.) and at Quote San Francesco (5th- 6th c.).

Between the 2nd and 3rd centuries many smaller villa-farms, which had lower productivity and could not compete with the larger ones (especially latifundia), often failed and owners were forced to sell them to wealthy or more successful land owners who were able to invest in land and multiply their productivity and wealth. The new owners were then able to expand their luxurious villas with greater opulence and monumental style. In Bruttium for these reasons, more than 60% of the villas from the Republican and early imperial period disappeared in this period, and this effect continued in the 4-5th centuries in particular in the coastal areas of the region.

The fortunate central position of this area in the Mediterranean and the good land and sea network were decisive factors for the investment by the rich Roman senatorial aristocracy and local notables in the 4th and 5th centuries, and for the holding of imperial property which was significant in this area. Southern Italy was one of the last enclaves, between the 5th and 6th centuries, of great estates and of economic development linked to agriculture, livestock farming, craftsmanship and trade, while elsewhere in Italy the system was crumbling. The coastal area, however, was abandoned in the 7th century due probably to Arab incursions which led to development of centres in the safest hills in the interior, such as Gerace.

== The Villa ==
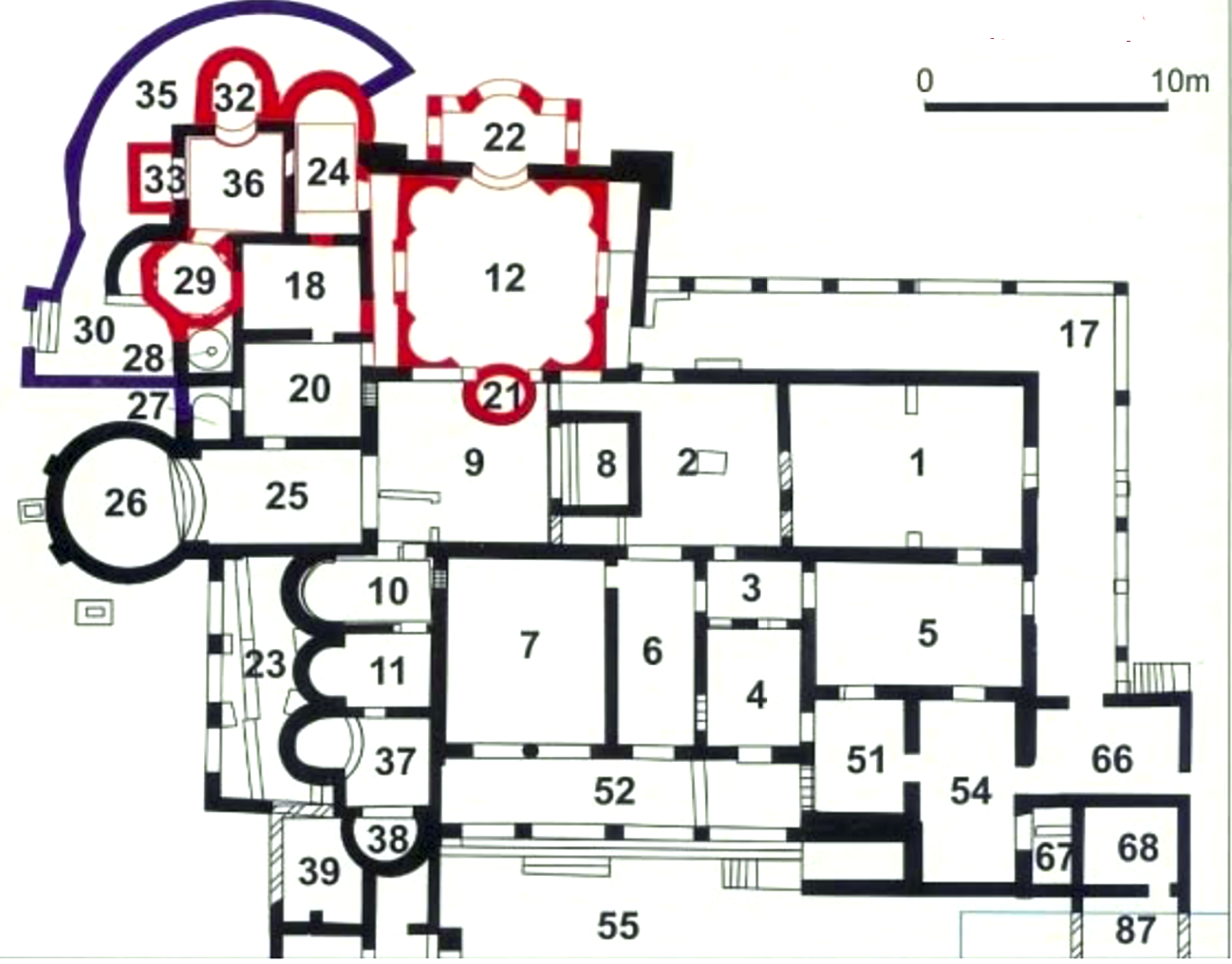
Plan of baths

The site was split in two by the modern road.

The main buildings were placed around a large central peristyle (courtyard) garden. The residential part (pars urbana) of the villa with a grand facade overlooking the sea is on the eastern side. On the western side of the peristyle (and the modern road) is a richly decorated large private double bath complex.

Further to the northwest was another large garden with a nymphaeum.

The monumental baths are as big as many ancient public baths, but their richness and magnificence of decoration are more consistent with private baths in this location. Their external appearance would also have been impressive as the roofs were vaulted and domed. The two independent bath suites is a feature of other 4th century villas and may have been influenced by Christianity, which banned mixed bathing and promoted modesty among the newly converted.

Other possible parts such as the pars rustica (for servants and other workers) and the pars fructaria (for the processing of products) typical of a Roman villa have not yet been found.

=== The Western Baths ===
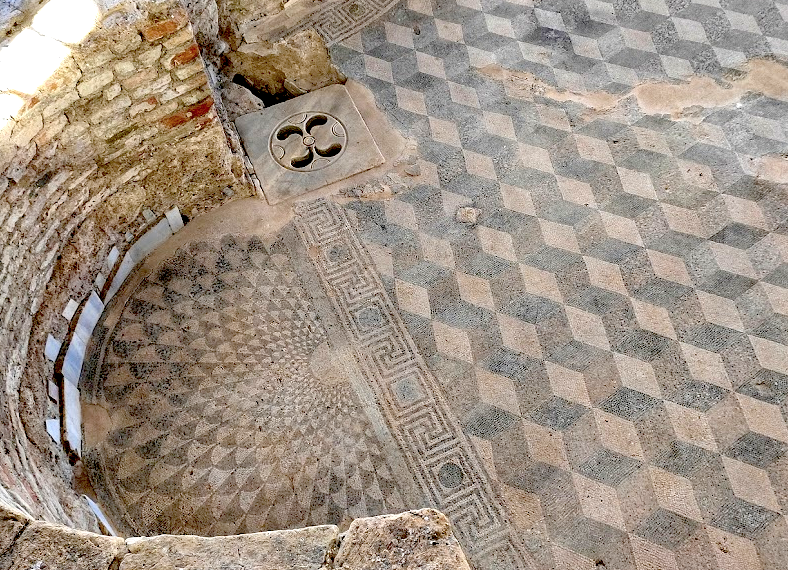
Apse of western frigidarium (12)

The great monumentalisation of the baths occurred between the 2nd and 3rd centuries, when several large rooms were created some of which have apses. At the same time various rooms received their elegant mosaic flooring.

Portico 17 is on the northern and western sides of the baths giving the Western Baths a monumental entrance from the garden and an exercise area from where the bather would pass into a small corridor then into the frigidarium (room 12), one of the most opulent and elegant rooms of the entire villa. This room has an octagonal plan with four apses and two pools, and measures about 6 x 6 m with walls veneered in exotic marble, some of which is still visible today. The domed or vaulted ceiling was covered in a blue glass mosaic resembling a blue sky enhanced by the sparkling reflection of the water below. The frigidaria are the biggest rooms of the Western and Eastern (Room 9 & 25) baths and played an important part in Roman bathing because they were cool, refreshing spaces and suitable for large groups who could bathe and relax more comfortably here, or conduct business at leisure.

The calidarium suite (24, 36 and 29) has a hypocaust heating system with clay pipes in the walls. Room 24 has two apses on opposing sides for stone or marble benches. Room 36 has two heated pools (32 and 33), both veneered in exotic marble, and a floor with a complex, polychrome geometric mosaic. Room 29 is octagonal with an opus signinum floor covering a damaged mosaic floor with a polychrome motif of entwined circles containing stylised flowers. The ceiling was decorated with a glittering mosaic since many glassy tesserae were found in the debris of this room.

Room 20 has a monochrome mosaic with a swastika and square motif and was probably a tepidarium. Room 18 is from an earlier version of the Western Baths and linked to Room 20 through a door, but in the 4th century the marble slabs that originally covered its walls were removed and perhaps reused elsewhere.

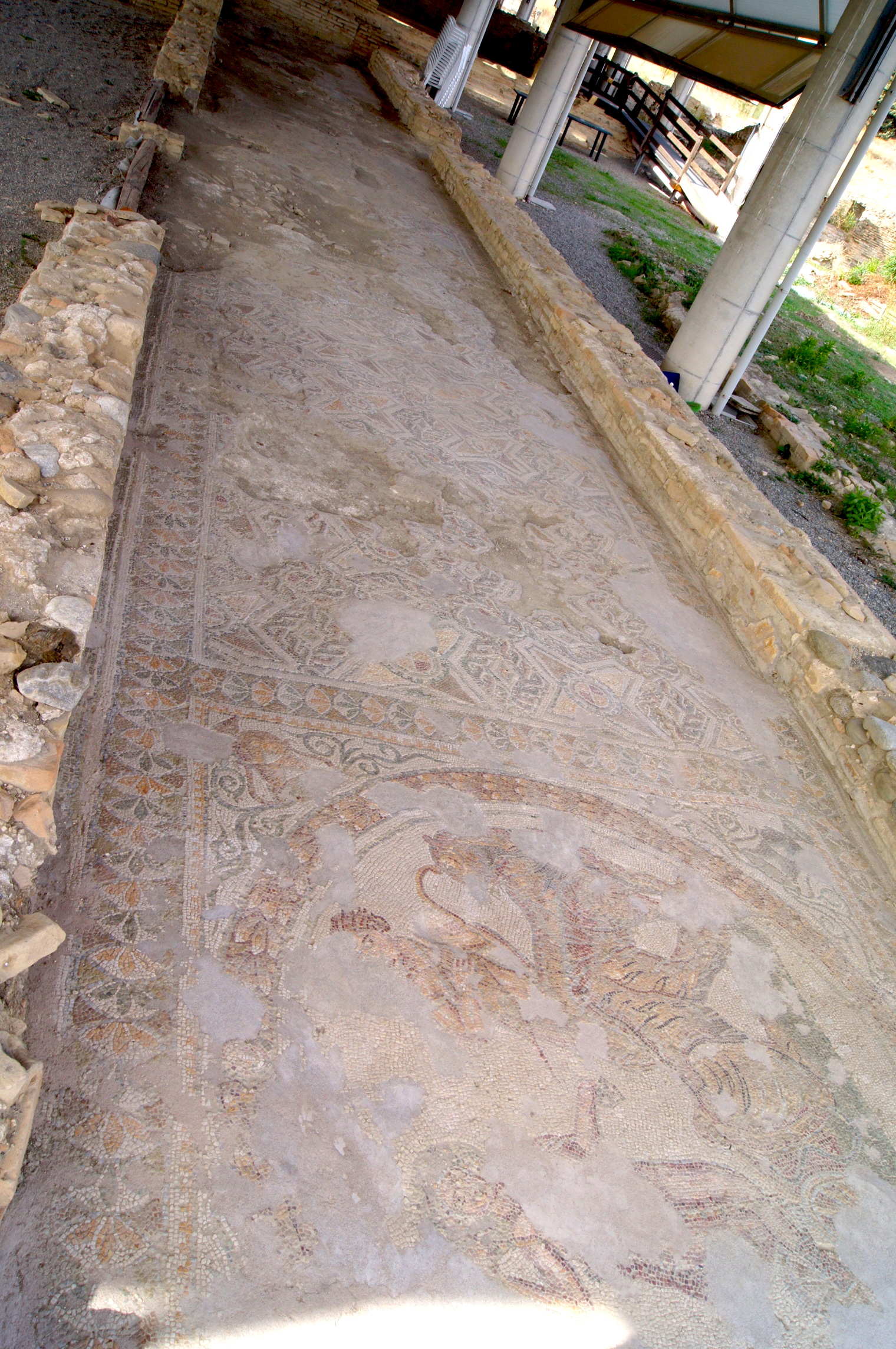
Portico (room 17)

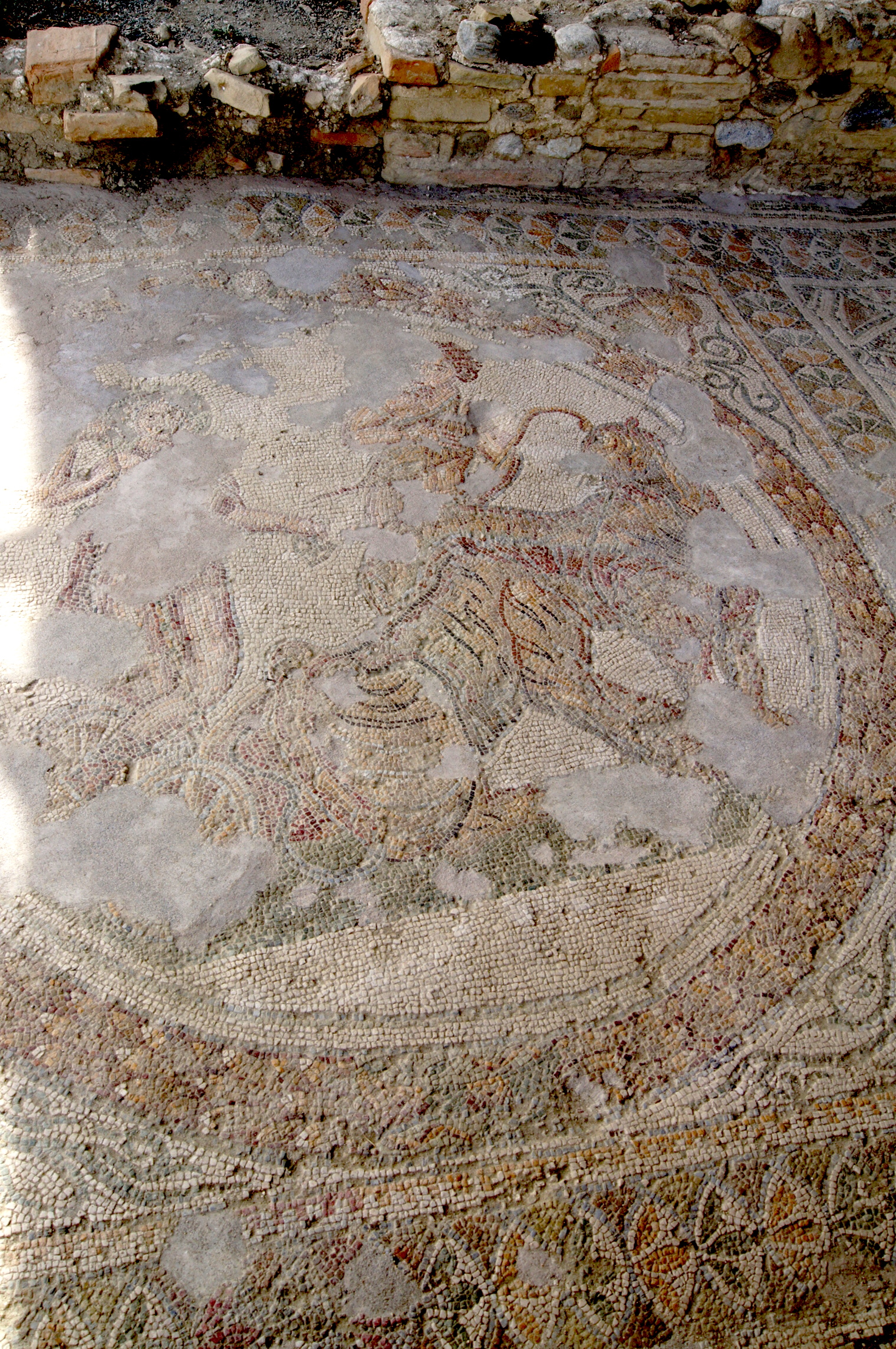
room 17

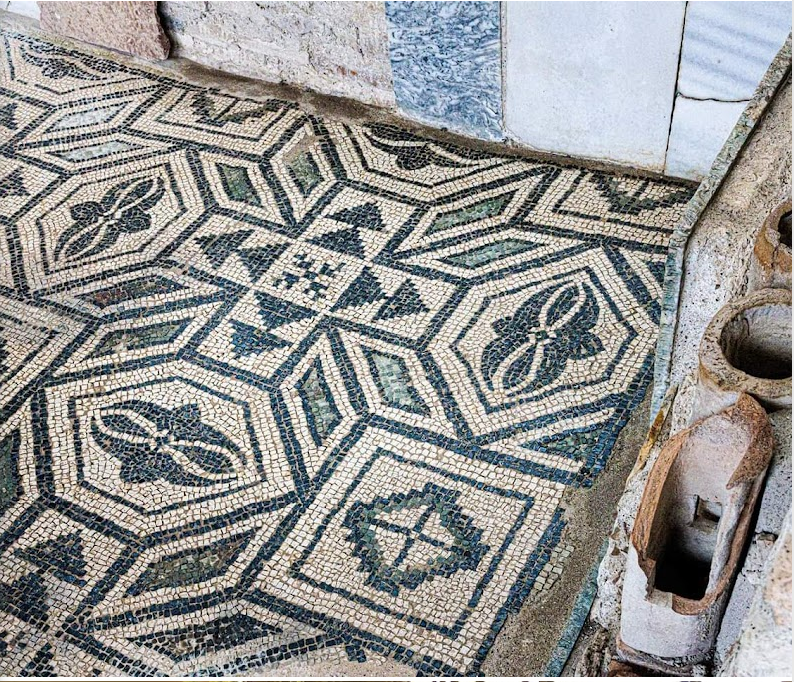
Calidarium (24) of western baths

=== The Eastern Baths ===
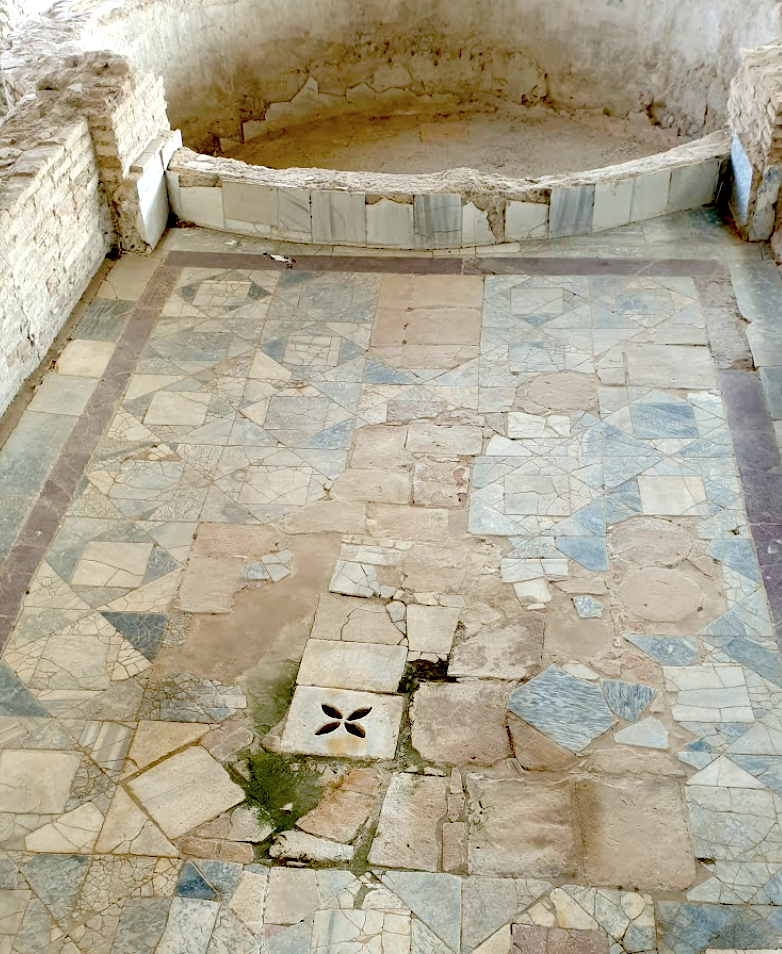
Frigidarium (25) of eastern baths

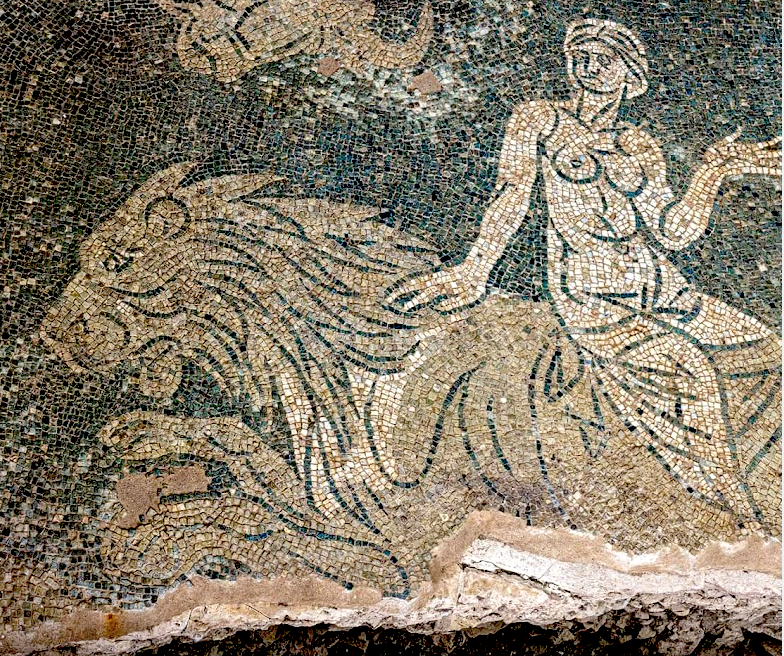
Nereid mosaic (9)

The Eastern Baths were also enlarged and elegantly decorated during the last renovation of the villa.

The columned entrance via portico 52 was from peristyle courtyard 55, which were areas typically used for exercising.

Room 9 of the frigidarium suite (9 & 25) has a mosaic floor dated to the 3rd century of large green and white tesserae of different shades depicting a marine thiasos of four Nereids riding a sea monster in the form of a horse, lion, bull and a tiger all terminating in fish tails. A drain was dug through it during the last building phase but never repaired. On the north side of the room is a large rectangular pool on the west side of which is a small space with a hole for a bench perhaps for a latrine. Room 25 is next to Room 9 and is paved with exquisite marble opus sectile and has walls veneered in marble some of which is still in place. The upper parts of the walls were frescoed. A huge cold bath in the south side of the room is paved with a monochrome mosaic and its walls tiled with 1.5 m high marble slabs. Three windows from this pool opened onto the garden, and the room also had a vaulted ceiling with mosaic imitating the sky.

The calidarium suite (10, 11, and 37) is the heated part of the baths and is paved with recycled marble tiles.

=== Banqueting rooms of the baths ===
In the common "service" area Room 7 became important in the whole bath quarter after a remarkable embellishment. A monumental entrance from the peristyle (room 52) was created and a flight of four steps was added on the eastern side. It has an elegant polychrome geometric mosaic floor and was probably a triclinium, or dining room, since it overlooks the garden and its proximity to the baths corresponds to the Roman custom to dine after exercising and bathing. Public reception rooms in large houses, especially in the 4th century, often served also as a triclinium and stood out among other rooms of the same complex as being more spacious and elegantly decorated.

The elite were obliged to entertain guests and display their social status through the standard of their homes with their architectural grandeur, in order to meet friends but more importantly to create political ties and exhibit social status. A dominus would often invite his clients who in return gave him political support.

Rooms 1, 2, 3, 4, 5, 6, 51 and 54 are other service rooms on the western side for the common bath area.

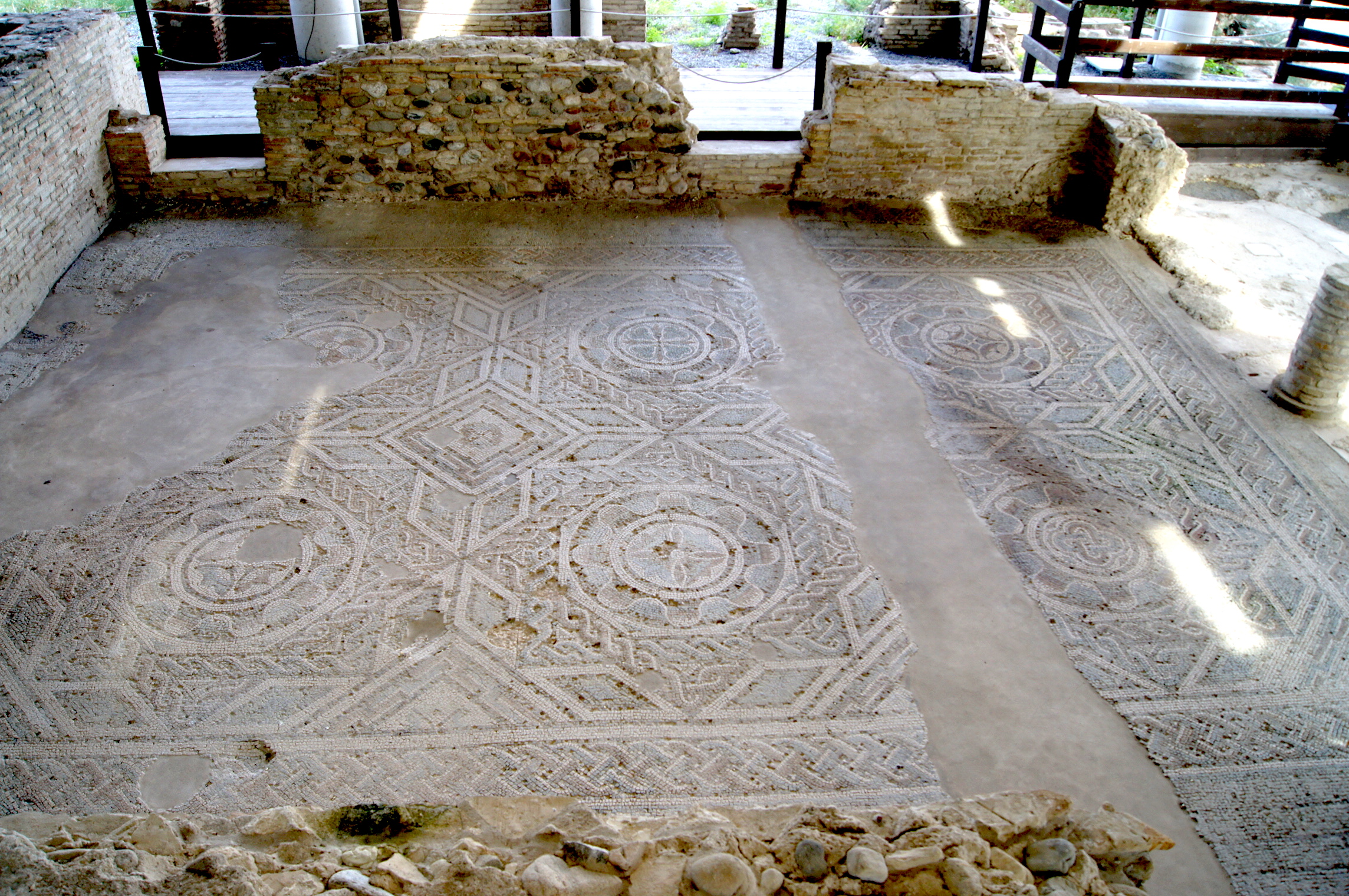
Triclinium (room 7)

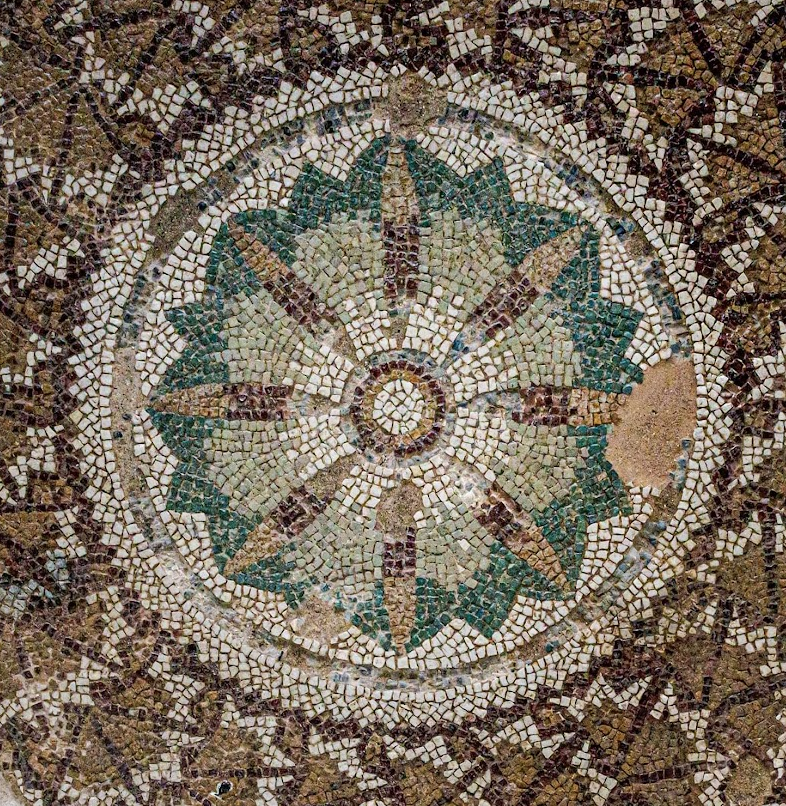
Mosaic in room 7

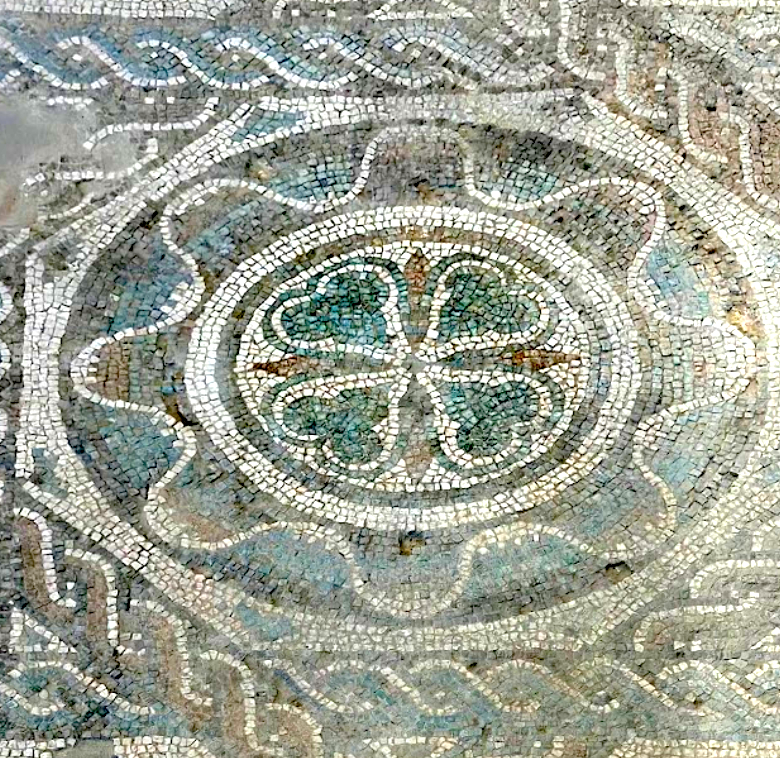
Mosaic in room 7

=== The residential part ===
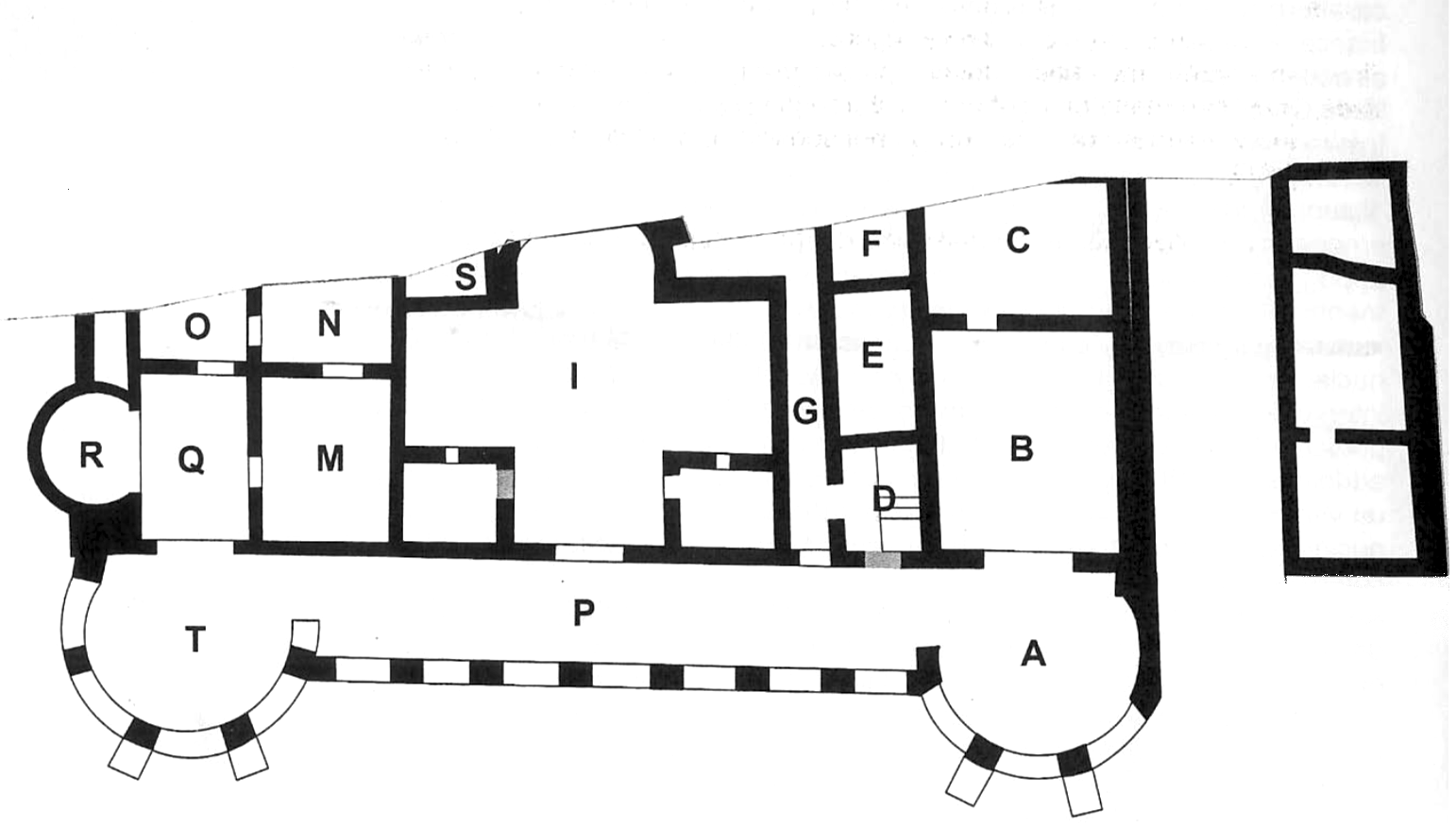
Residential part

The residential part overlooked the sea and a garden on the west side, and has a monumental facade flanked by two towers of several floors and protuding towards the sea. This almost unique design feature in Roman villas was apparently similar only to that at the Villa della Palombara in Lazio. This part is the result of several modifications and additions from between the third and mid-fourth centuries. Behind the facade was the residential area. The entrances to this part were from the coastal façade and also from the peristyle (55).

At the centre of this building (Room I) is by far the largest room (11.5 x 13.6 m) with a cruciform plan and an apse (ca. 6 m wide) on the western side at the head of the cross. The sumptuous decoration of floor mosaics, wall marble veneers and frescoes show the importance of this room as the main hall of the villa in the fourth century. The entrance to this room is via the main entrance in front and implies that this room was an audience or dining room similar to those at imperial palaces. The central mosaic features a polychrome motif while the western arm of the cruciform plan has a monochrome composition of hexagons within six-pointed stars.

Room B also stands out for size and rich decoration with a mosaic of the Four Seasons, most likely used as a reception room.

Room Q has a floor mosaic of Dionysus pouring wine into an amphora assisted by a Satyr a common theme in late antiquity triclinia and reception rooms.

The area between Room Q and Room R has a floor mosaic with lotus flowers containing two spirals at the centre, placed to link Rooms Q and R, which seem to create one space, a sort of elegant small belvedere on the south side of the villa.

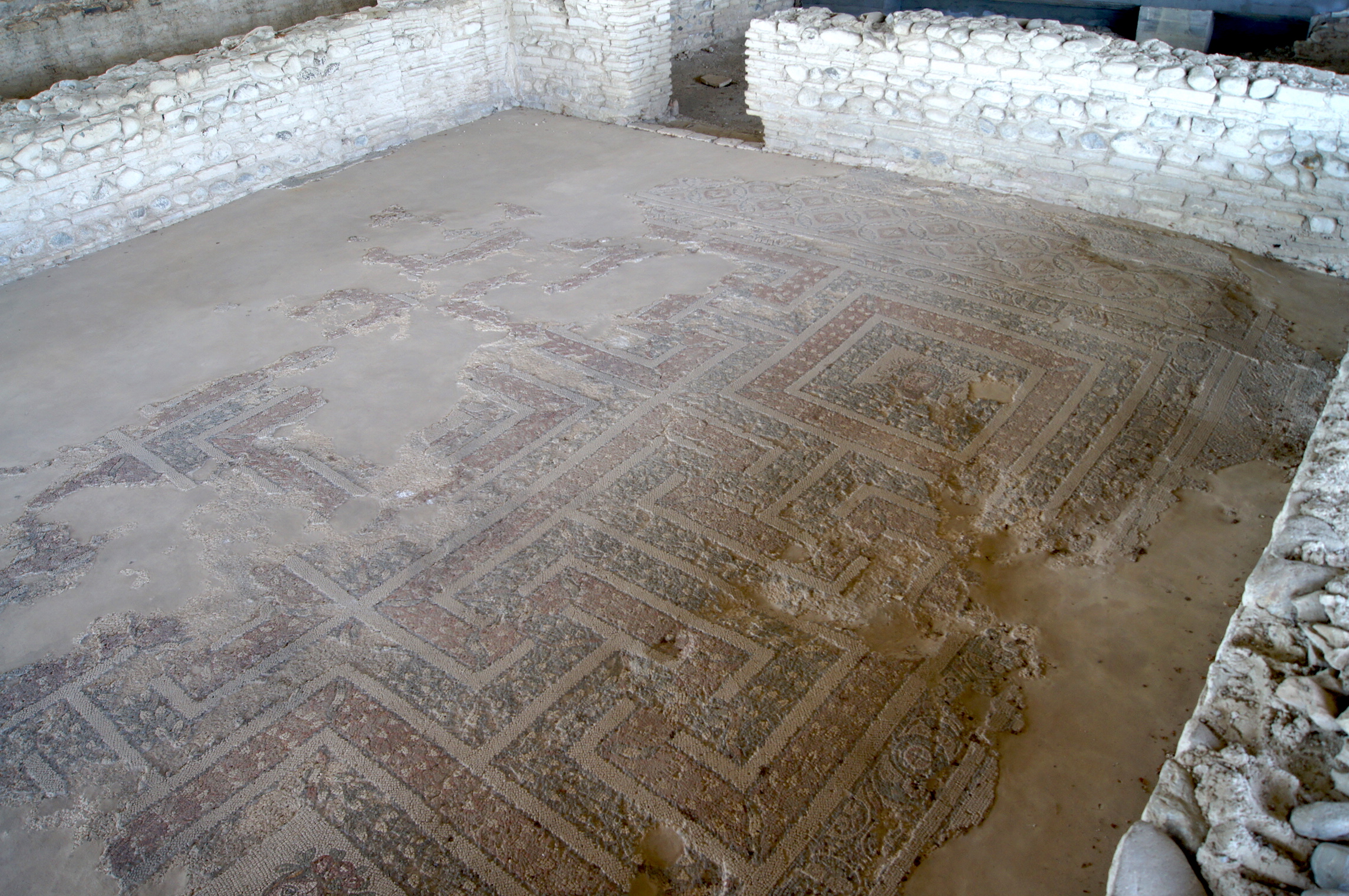
Seasons mosaic, room B

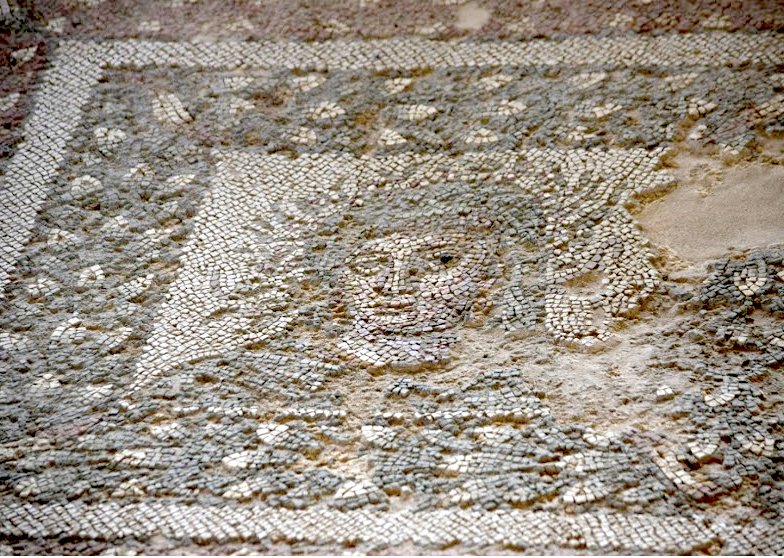
Seasons mosaic - Winter

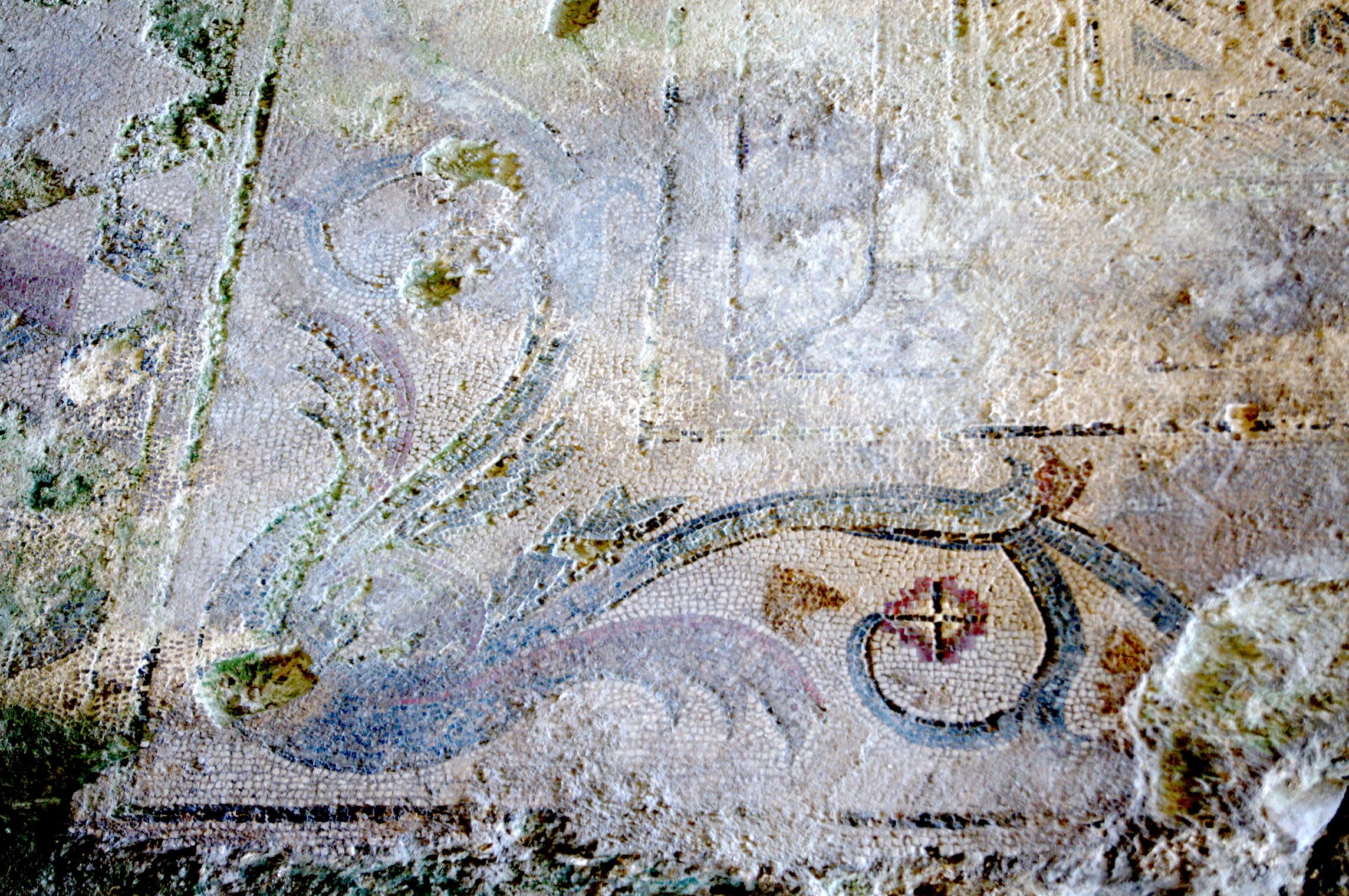
room I

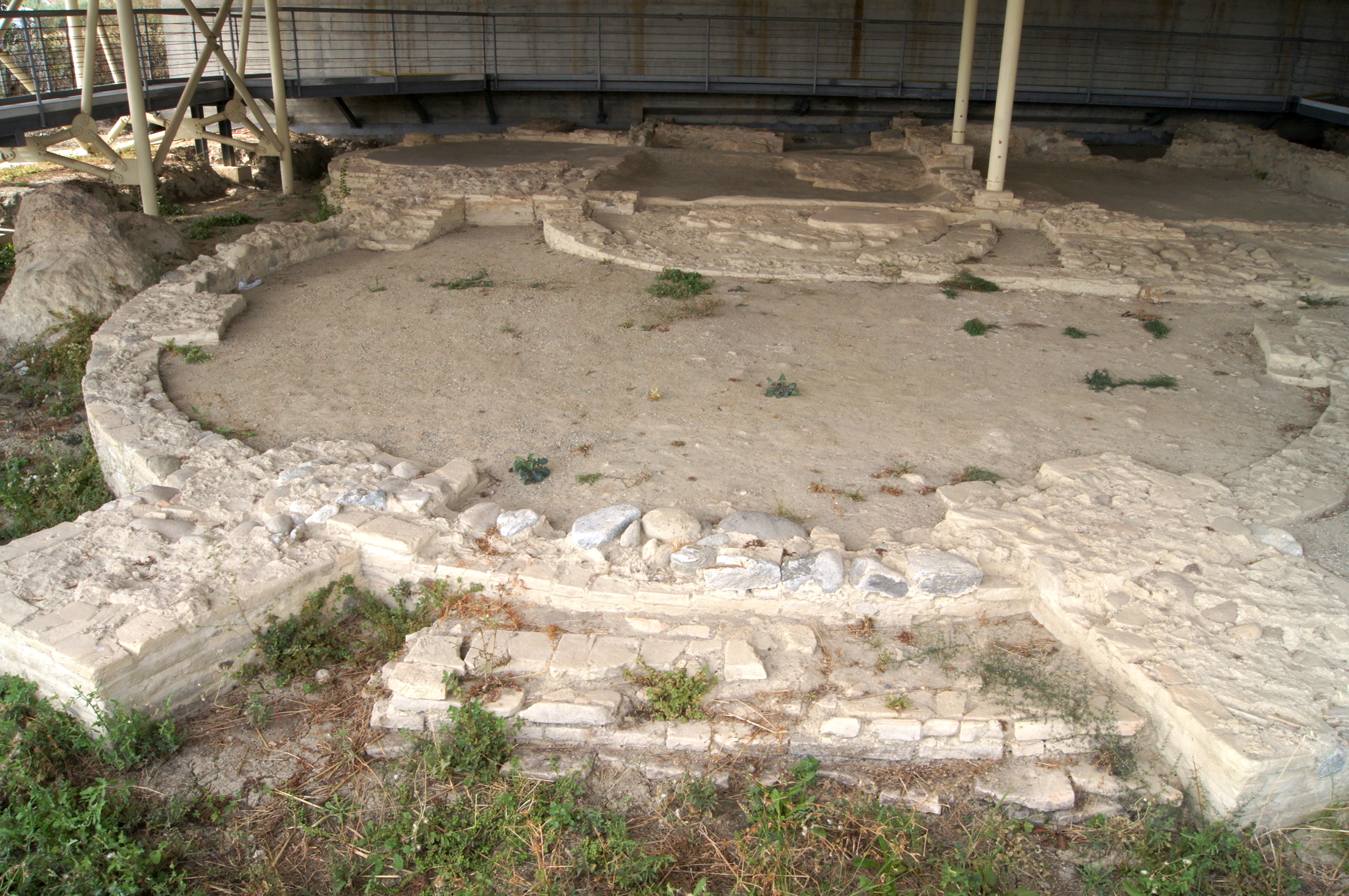
room T

=== The southern sector ===
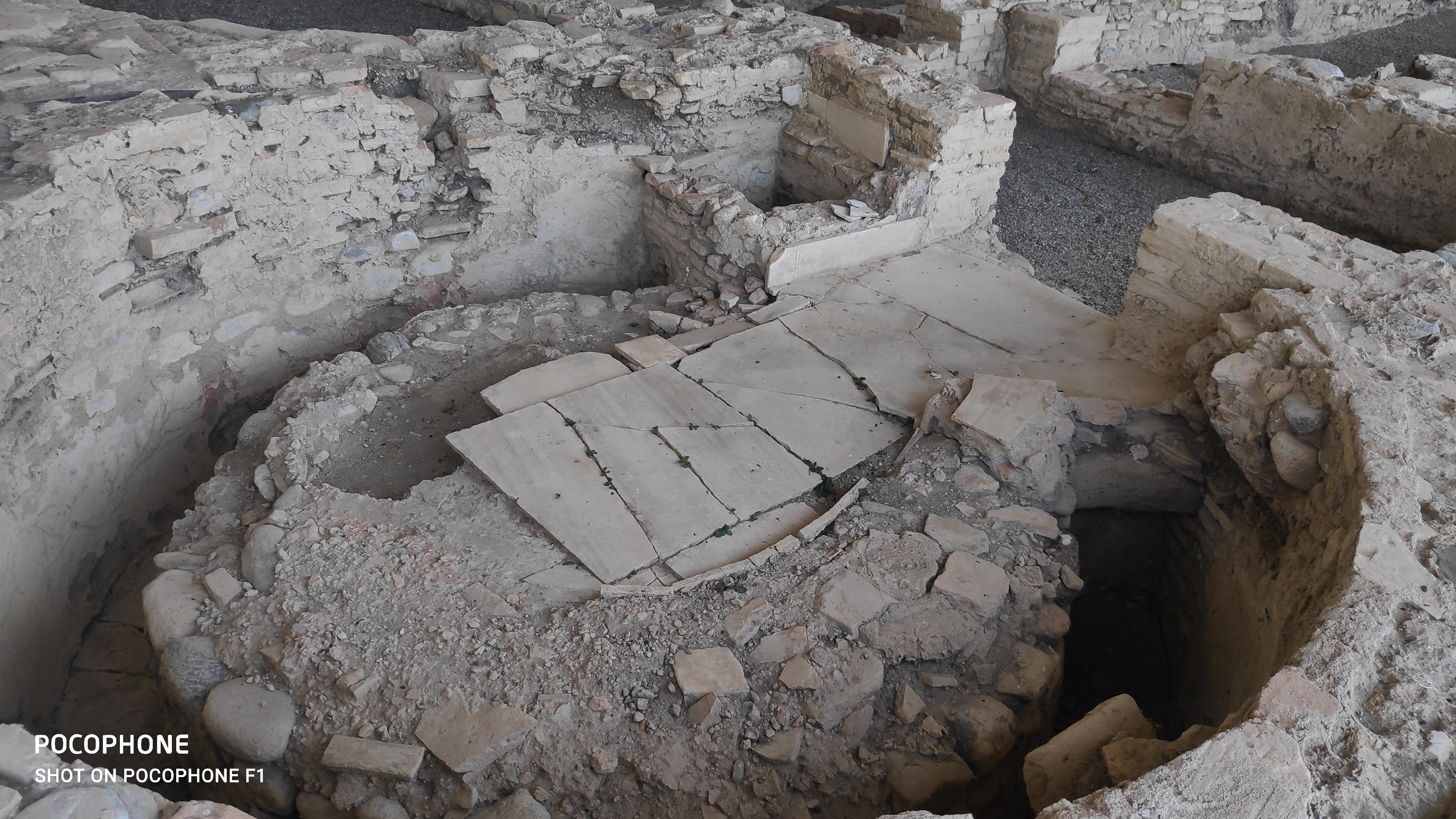
Latrine (40)

East of the baths, this sector linked the baths to the residential part via portico 59 on one side of the main peristyle of the villa (55) with a geometric polychrome mosaic floor.

The circular latrine (40) had an expensive marble floor and the ledge for seats can be seen on the wall 70 cm apart with seven seat dividers accommodating about 10 people. In front of them runs a water channel that was used to wash the sponges. A small lavatory in the north-western corner of the room was furnished by water pipes. In an earlier phase a second smaller latrine (42) was located on the opposite side of latrine 40 and may have been used by women, the only remains of which are a seat bench and the drain.

=== Other buildings ===
To the west of the baths is a monumental nymphaeum with cisterns which lay to the south of a large garden.

The Roman statio of Altanum was also nearby or possibly located at the villa.
